= Music technology (electric) =

Musical instruments and recording devices that use electrical circuits

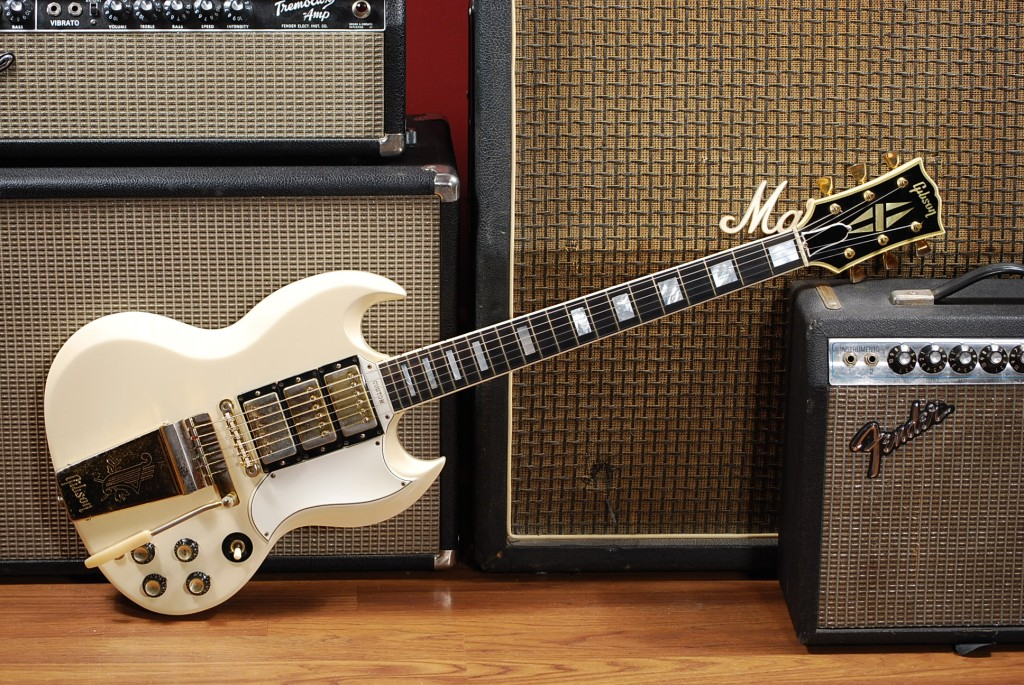
A 1963 Gibson SG Custom electric guitar with its headstock leaning on a small guitar amplifier, which contains a power amplifier and a loudspeaker in a wooden cabinet

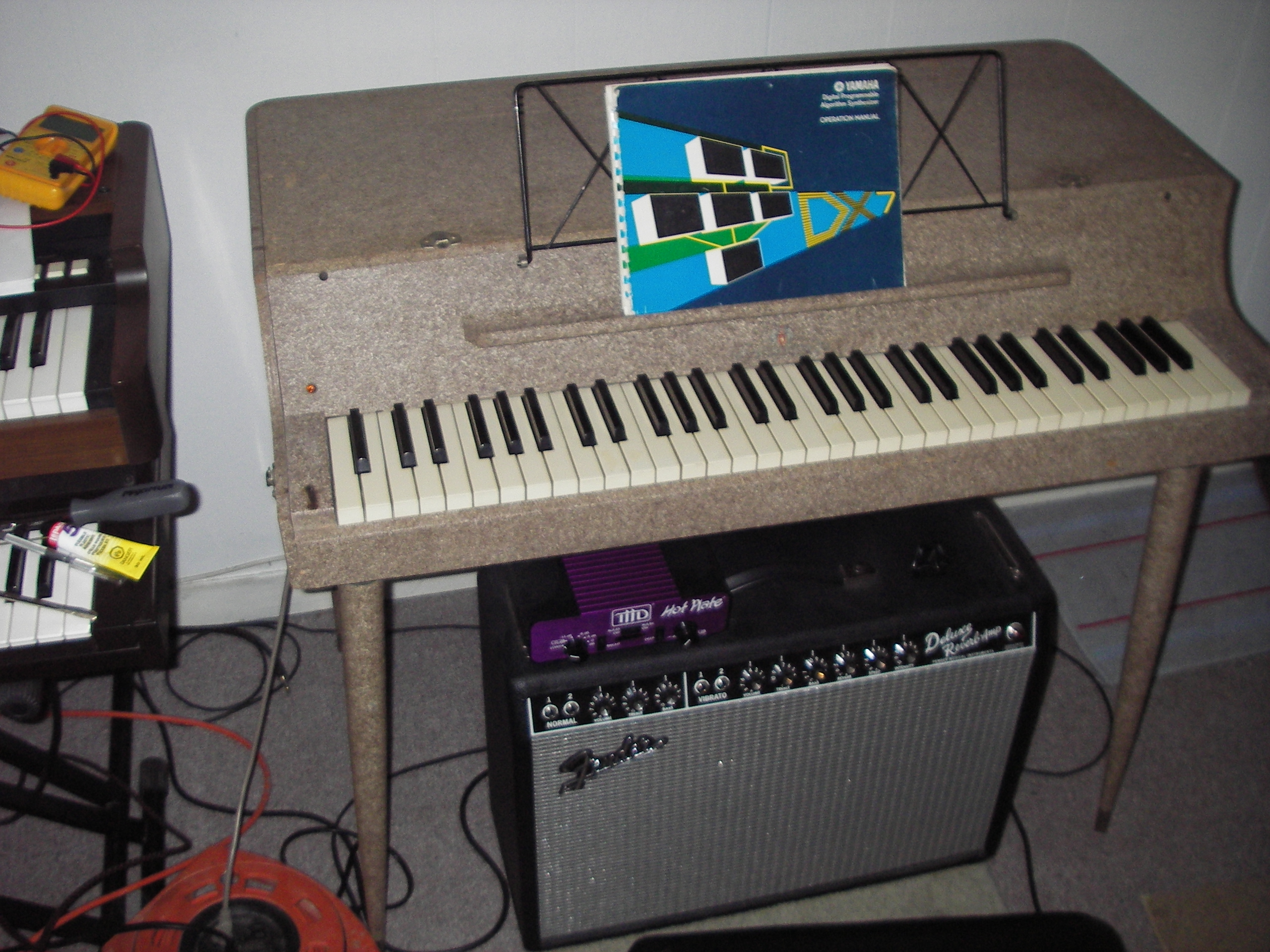
A Wurlitzer model 112 electric piano plugged into an instrument amplifier

Electric music technology refers to musical instruments and recording devices that use electrical circuits, which are often combined with mechanical technologies. Examples of electric musical instruments include the electro-mechanical electric piano (invented in 1929), the electric guitar (invented in 1931), the electro-mechanical Hammond organ (developed in 1934) and the electric bass (invented in 1935). All of these electric instruments do not produce a sound that is sufficiently audible in a performance setting unless they are connected to instrument amplifiers and loudspeaker cabinets, which make them loud enough for performers and the audience to hear. Amplifiers and loudspeakers are separate from the instrument in the case of the electric guitar (which uses a guitar amplifier), electric bass (which uses a bass amplifier) and some electric organs (which use a Leslie speaker or similar cabinet) and most electric pianos. Some electric organs and electric pianos include the amplifier and speaker cabinet within the main housing for the instrument.

Electric sound recording and reproduction are electrical or mechanical techniques and devices for the inscription and re-creation of sound waves, such as spoken voice, singing, instrumental music, or sound effects. Acoustic analog recording is achieved by a small microphone diaphragm that can record sound waves on a phonograph (in which a stylus senses grooves on a record) or magnetic tape. The first practical sound recording and reproduction device was the mechanical phonograph cylinder, invented by Thomas Edison in 1877 and patented in 1878. The next major technical development was the invention of the gramophone disc in 1889. For much of the 20th century, records were the most common way of selling sound recordings. The widespread availability of records and the development of radio broadcasting enabled a much larger proportion of people to listen to songs and pieces performed by the top artists, enabling the development of national and even international musical stars. In the 1970s, the compact cassette became a major consumer audio format. Advances in electronic and mechanical miniaturization led to the development of the Sony Walkman, a pocket-sized cassette player introduced in 1979, which allowed consumers to listen to their favourite albums outside of their home.

== Electric instruments ==
=== Electric piano ===
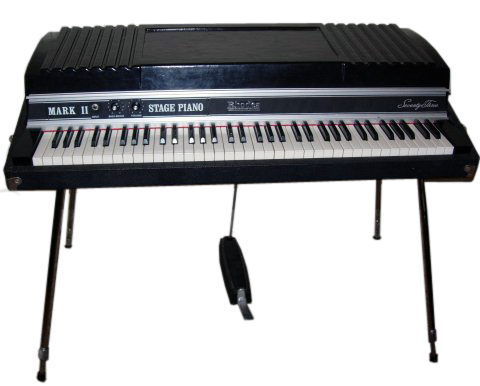
A Rhodes Mark II Stage 73 electric piano. It has to be plugged into an instrument amplifier or guitar amp to be heard by the performer and audience.

An electric piano is an electric musical instrument which produces sounds when a performer presses the keys of the piano-style musical keyboard. Pressing keys causes mechanical hammers to strike metal strings or tines, leading to vibrations which are converted into electrical signals by magnetic pickups, which are then connected to an instrument amplifier and loudspeaker to make a sound loud enough for the performer and audience to hear. Unlike a synthesizer, the electric piano is not an electronic instrument. Instead, it is an electro-mechanical instrument. Some early electric pianos used lengths of wire to produce the tone, like a traditional piano. Smaller electric pianos used short slivers of steel, metal tines or short wires to produce the tone. The earliest electric pianos were invented in the late 1920s; the 1929 Neo-Bechstein electric grand piano was among the first. Probably the earliest stringless model was Lloyd Loar's Vivi-Tone Clavier. A few other noteworthy producers of electric pianos include Baldwin Piano and Organ Company and the Wurlitzer company.

Early electric piano recordings include Duke Ellington's in 1955 and Sun Ra's India as well as other tracks from the 1956 sessions included on his second album Super Sonic Jazz (aka Super Sonic Sounds). The popularity of the electric piano began to grow in the late 1950s after Ray Charles's 1959 hit record "What'd I Say", reaching its height during the 1970s, after which they were progressively displaced by more lightweight electronic pianos capable of piano-like sounds without the disadvantages of electric pianos' heavy weight and moving mechanical parts. Another factor driving their development and acceptance was the progressive electrification of popular music and the need for a portable keyboard instrument capable of high-volume amplification. Musicians adopted a number of types of domestic electric pianos for rock and pop use. This encouraged their manufacturers to modify them for stage use and then develop models primarily intended for stage use.

Digital electronic stage pianos have largely replaced most of the original electro-mechanical instruments in the 2000s, due to the small size, low weight and versatility of digital instruments, which can produce a huge range of tones besides piano tones (e.g., emulations of Hammond organ sounds, synthesizer sounds, etc.). However, some performers still perform and record with vintage electric pianos. In 2009, Fender Rhodes produced a new line of electro-mechanical pianos, known as the Rhodes Mark 7 followed by an offering from Vintage Vibe.

=== Electric guitar ===
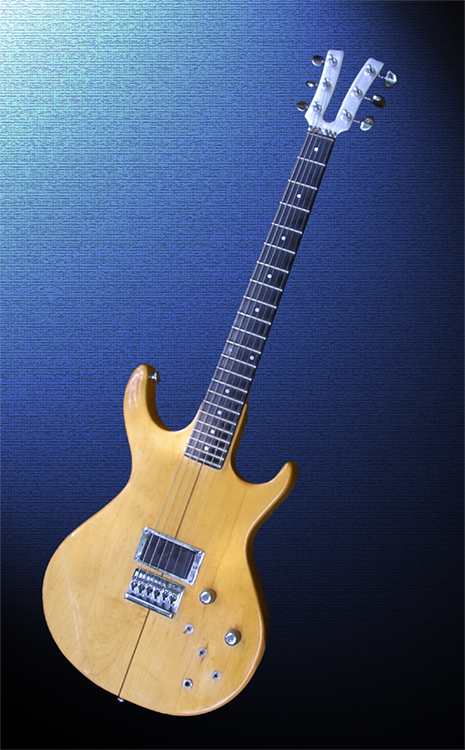
A Kramer XKG-20 electric guitar c. 1980

An electric guitar is a guitar that uses a pickup to convert the vibration of its strings into electrical impulses. The most common guitar pickup uses the principle of direct electromagnetic induction. The signal generated by an electric guitar is too weak to drive a loudspeaker, so it is amplified before being sent to a loudspeaker. The output of an electric guitar is an electric signal, and the signal can easily be altered by electronic circuits to add color to the sound. Often the signal is modified using electronic effects such as reverb and distortion.

Invented in 1931, the electric guitar became a necessity as jazz guitarists sought to amplify their sound in the big band format. Early proponents of the electric guitar on record included Les Paul, Lonnie Johnson, Sister Rosetta Tharpe, T-Bone Walker, and Charlie Christian. During the 1950s and 1960s, the electric guitar became the most important instrument in pop music. It has evolved into an instrument that is capable of a multitude of sounds and styles. It served as a major component in the development of electric blues, rock and roll, rock music, and many other genres of music.

Electric guitar design and construction vary greatly in the shape of the body and the configuration of the neck, bridge, and pickups. Guitars have a fixed bridge or a spring-loaded hinged bridge that lets players bend notes or chords up or down in pitch or perform a vibrato. The sound of a guitar can be modified by new playing techniques such as string bending, tapping, hammering on, using audio feedback, or slide guitar playing. There are several types of electric guitar, including the solid-body guitar, various types of hollow-body guitars, the seven-string guitar, which typically adds a low B string below the low E, and the twelve-string electric guitar, which has six pairs of strings.

Popular music and rock groups often use the electric guitar in two roles: as a rhythm guitar, which provides the chord sequence or progression and sets the beat (as part of a rhythm section), and as a lead guitar, which is used to perform melody lines, melodic instrumental fill passages, and solos.

=== Hammond organ ===
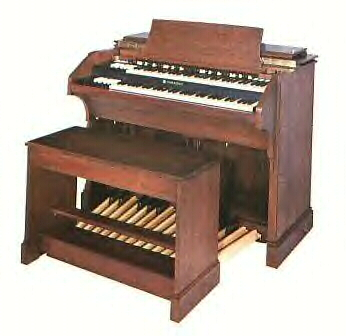
A Hammond C-3 electric organ

The Hammond organ is an electric organ, invented by Laurens Hammond and John M. Hanert and first manufactured in 1935. Various models have been produced, most of which use sliding drawbars to create a variety of sounds. Until 1975, Hammond organs generated sound by creating an electric current from rotating a metal tonewheel near an electromagnetic pickup. Around two million Hammond organs have been manufactured, and it has been described as one of the most successful organs. The organ is commonly used with, and associated with, the Leslie speaker.

The organ was originally marketed and sold by the Hammond Organ Company to churches as a lower-cost alternative to the wind-driven pipe organ, or instead of a piano. It quickly became popular with professional jazz musicians, who found it a cheaper alternative to the big band. Jimmy Smith's use of the Hammond B-3, with its additional harmonic percussion feature, inspired a generation of organ players, and its use became more widespread in the 1960s and 1970s in rhythm and blues, rock and reggae, as well as being an important instrument in progressive rock.

The Hammond Organ Company struggled financially during the 1970s as they abandoned tonewheel organs and switched to manufacturing instruments using integrated circuits. These instruments were not as popular with musicians as the tonewheels had been, and the company went out of business in 1985. The Hammond name was purchased by the Suzuki Musical Instrument Corporation, which proceeded to manufacture digital simulations of the most popular tonewheel organs. This culminated in the production of the New B-3 in 2002, which provided an accurate recreation of the original B-3 organ using modern digital technology.

Hammond-Suzuki continues to manufacture a variety of organs for both professional players and churches. Other companies, such as Korg, Roland and Clavia, have also achieved success in providing emulations of the original tonewheel organs. The sound of a tonewheel Hammond can also be emulated using modern software such as Native Instruments B4.

=== Electric bass ===
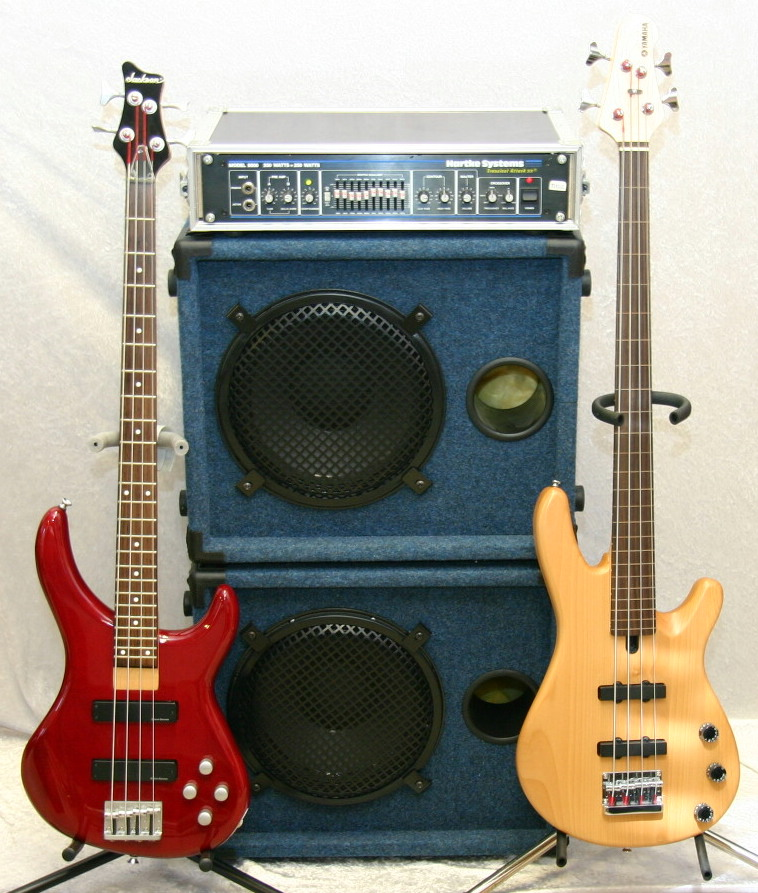
Two electric basses and a bass amplifier. This amplification setup is a bass stack approach, in which an amplifier (in this case a Hartke 5000) is plugged into separate speaker cabinets.

The electric bass (or bass guitar) is a stringed instrument played primarily with the fingers or thumb, by plucking, slapping, popping, strumming, tapping, thumping, or picking with a plectrum, often known as a pick. The bass guitar is similar in appearance and construction to an electric guitar, but with a longer neck and scale length, and four to six strings or courses. The four-string bass, by far the most common, is usually tuned the same as the double bass, which corresponds to pitches one octave lower than the four lowest pitched strings of a guitar (E, A, D, and G). The bass guitar is a transposing instrument, as it is notated in bass clef an octave higher than it sounds (as is the double bass) to avoid excessive ledger lines. Like the electric guitar, the bass guitar is plugged into an amplifier and speaker for live performances.

Since the 1960s, the bass guitar has largely replaced the double bass in popular music as the bass instrument in the rhythm section. While types of bass lines vary widely from one style of music to another, the bassist usually fulfills a similar role: anchoring the harmonic framework and establishing the beat. Many styles of music utilise the bass guitar, including rock, metal, pop, punk rock, country, reggae, gospel, blues, and jazz. It is often a solo instrument in jazz, jazz fusion, Latin, funk, progressive rock and other rock and metal styles.

== Electric sound recording and reproduction ==
Electric sound recording and reproduction are electrical or mechanical techniques and devices for the inscription and re-creation of sound waves, such as spoken voice, singing, instrumental music, or sound effects. Acoustic analog recording is achieved by a small microphone diaphragm that can detect changes in atmospheric pressure (acoustic sound waves) and record them as a graphic representation of the sound waves on a medium such as a phonograph (in which a stylus senses grooves on a record). In magnetic tape recording, the sound waves vibrate the microphone diaphragm and are converted into a varying electric current, which is then converted to a varying magnetic field by an electromagnet, which makes a representation of the sound as magnetized areas on a plastic tape with a magnetic coating on it. Analog sound reproduction is the reverse process, with a bigger loudspeaker diaphragm causing changes to atmospheric pressure to form acoustic sound waves. Electrically generated signals may also be recorded directly from devices such as an electric guitar pickup, without the use of acoustic sounds or amplifiers in the recording process (other than the need for musicians to hear herself playing during recording session).

=== Phonautograph ===
Au Clair de la Lune
This 1860 phonautogram by Édouard-Léon Scott de Martinville is the earliest known recording of a person singing.

The first device that could record actual sounds as they passed through the air (but could not play them back—the purpose was only visual study) was the phonautograph, patented in 1857 by Parisian inventor Édouard-Léon Scott de Martinville. The earliest known recordings of the human voice are phonautograph recordings, called phonautograms, made in 1857. They consist of sheets of paper with sound-wave-modulated white lines created by a vibrating stylus that cut through a coating of soot as the paper was passed under it.

=== Phonograph ===
==== Phonograph cylinder ====
"Kham Hom" ("Sweet Words")
Phonograph cylinder recording of Siamese (Thai) musicians visiting Berlin, Germany in 1900.

The first practical sound recording and reproduction device was the mechanical phonograph cylinder, invented by Thomas Edison in 1877 and patented in 1878. The invention soon spread across the globe and over the next two decades the commercial recording, distribution and sale of sound recordings became a growing new international industry, with the most popular titles selling millions of units by the early 1900s. The development of mass-production techniques enabled cylinder recordings to become a major new consumer item in industrial countries and the cylinder was the main consumer format from the late 1880s until around 1910.

==== Disc phonograph ====
Recording of Bell's voice on a wax disc in 1885, identified in 2013 [more details]

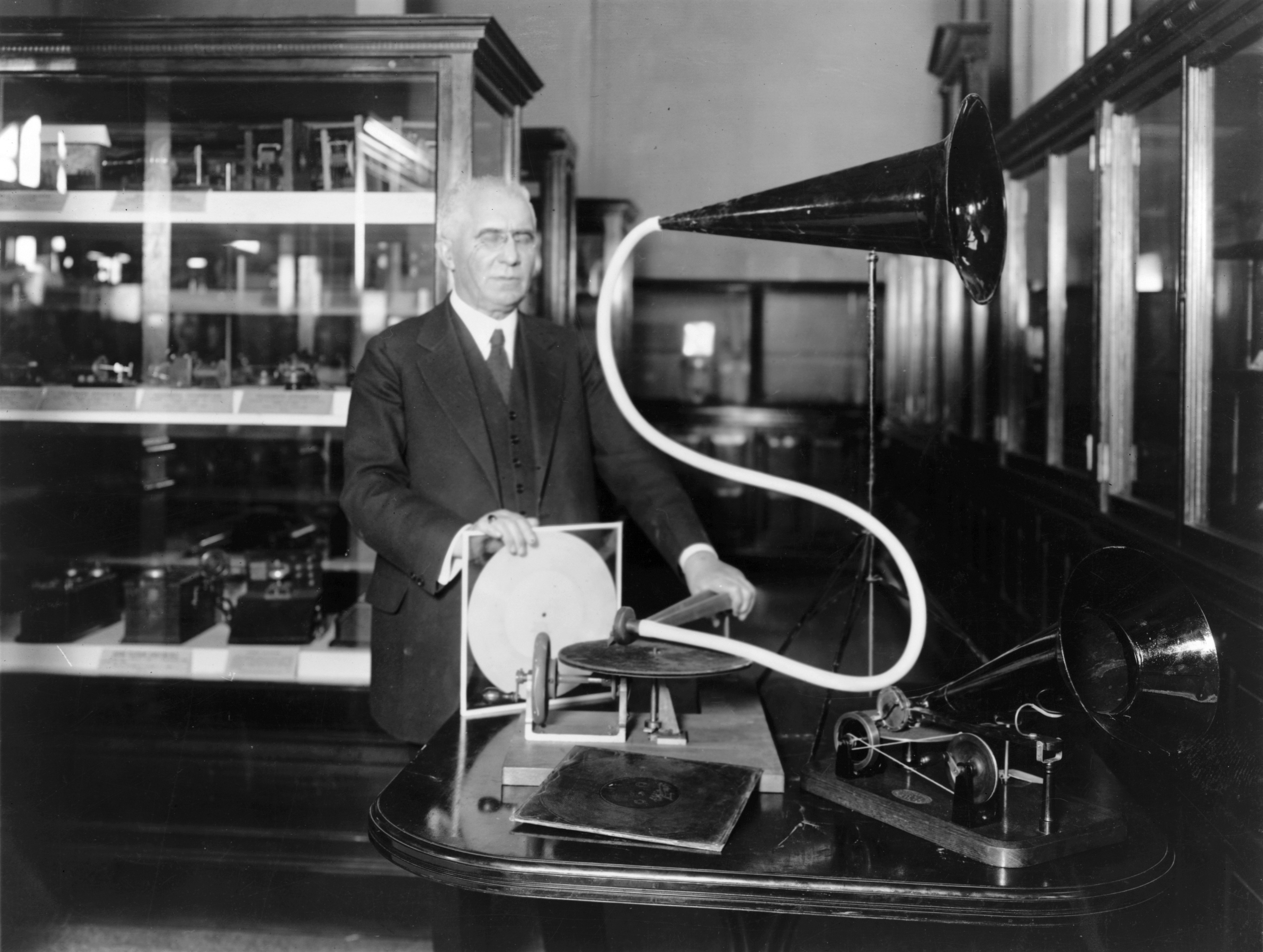
Emile Berliner with disc record gramophone

The next major technical development was the invention of the gramophone disc, generally credited to Emile Berliner and commercially introduced in the United States in 1889, though others had demonstrated similar disk apparatus earlier, most notably Alexander Graham Bell in 1881. Discs were easier to manufacture, transport and store, and they had the additional benefit of being louder (marginally) than cylinders, which by necessity, were single-sided. Sales of the gramophone record overtook the cylinder ca. 1910, and by the end of World War I the disc had become the dominant commercial recording format. In various permutations, the audio disc format became the primary medium for consumer sound recordings until the end of the 20th century, and the double-sided 78 rpm shellac disc was the standard consumer music format from the early 1910s to the late 1950s.

The long-playing 33 1/3 rpm microgroove vinyl record, or LP, was developed at Columbia Records and introduced in 1948. The short-playing but convenient 7-inch 45 rpm microgroove vinyl single was introduced by RCA Victor in 1949. In the US and most developed countries, the two new vinyl formats completely replaced 78 rpm shellac discs by the end of the 1950s, but in some corners of the world the 78 lingered on far into the 1960s. Vinyl was much more expensive than shellac, one of several factors that made its use for 78 rpm records very unusual, but with a long-playing disc the added cost was acceptable and the compact 45 format required very little material. Vinyl offered improved performance, both in stamping and in playback. If played with a good diamond stylus mounted in a lightweight pickup on a well-adjusted tonearm, it was long-lasting. If protected from dust, scuffs and scratches there was very little noise. Vinyl records were, over-optimistically, advertised as unbreakable. They were not, but they were much less fragile than shellac, which had itself once been touted as unbreakable compared to wax cylinders.

=== Electrical recording ===
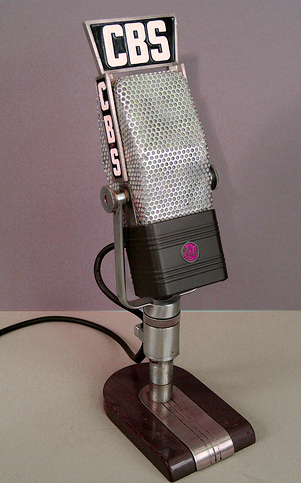
RCA-44, a classic ribbon microphone introduced in 1932. Similar units were widely used for recording and broadcasting in the 1940s and are occasionally still used today.

Between the invention of the phonograph in 1877 and the advent of digital media, arguably the most important milestone in the history of sound recording was the introduction of what was then called electrical recording, in which a microphone was used to convert the sound into an electrical signal that was amplified and used to actuate the recording stylus. This innovation eliminated the horn sound resonances characteristic of the acoustical process, produced clearer and more full-bodied recordings by greatly extending the useful range of audio frequencies, and allowed previously unrecordable distant and feeble sounds to be captured.

Sound recording began as a purely mechanical process. Except for a few crude telephone-based recording devices with no means of amplification, such as the Telegraphone, it remained so until the 1920s, when several recent radio-related developments in electronics converged to revolutionize the recording process. These included improved microphones and auxiliary devices such as electronic filters, all dependent on electronic amplification to be of practical use in recording. In 1906, Lee De Forest invented the Audion triode vacuum tube, an electronic valve that could amplify weak electrical signals. By 1915, it was in use in long-distance telephone circuits that made conversations between New York and San Francisco practical. Refined versions of this tube were the basis of all electronic sound systems until the commercial introduction of the first transistor-based audio devices in the 1950s.

=== Magnetic tape ===
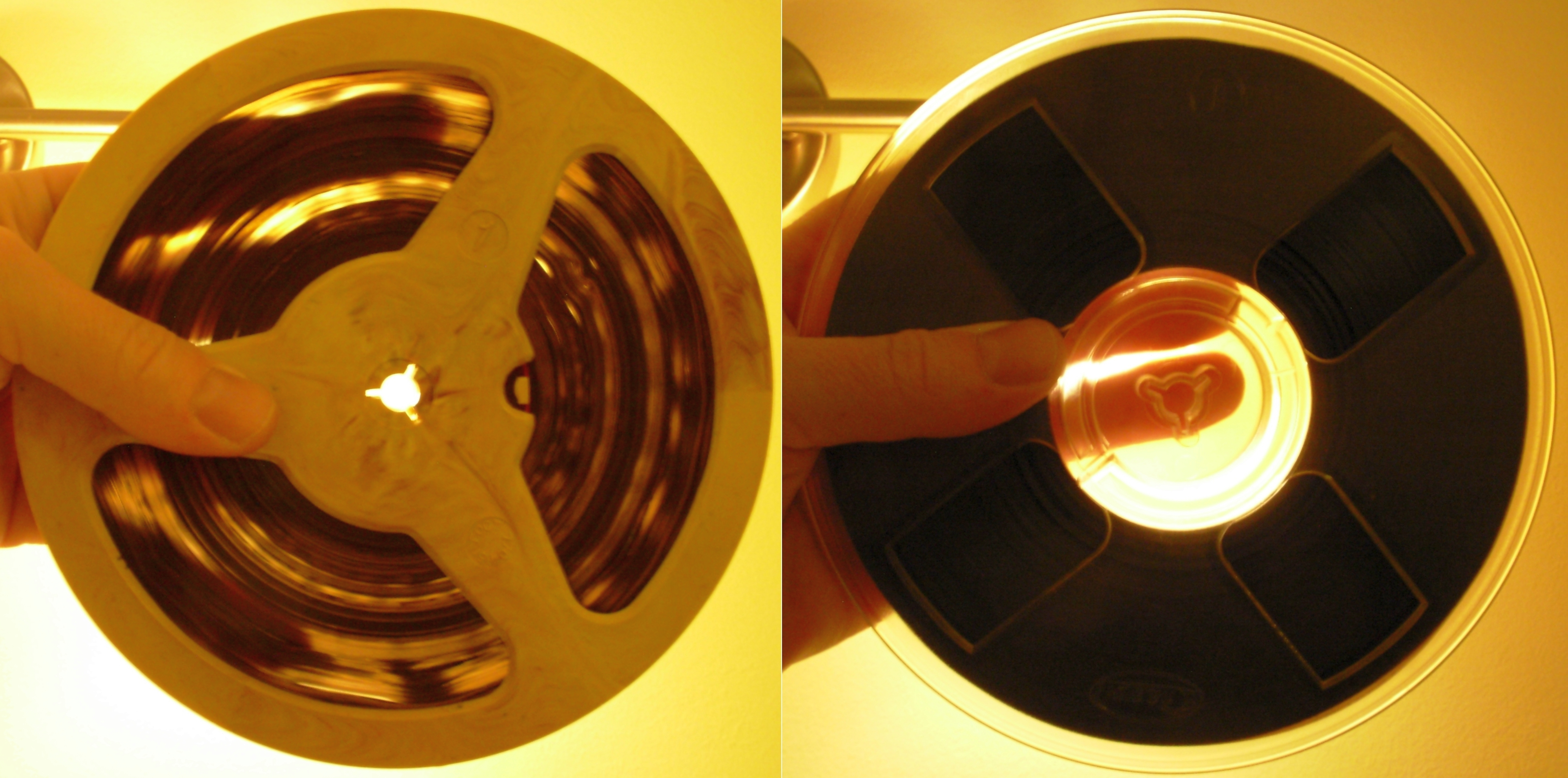
Magnetic audio tapes: acetate base (left) and polyester base (right)

An important field of invention during this period was the tape recorder. Magnetic tape recording uses an amplified electrical audio signal to generate analogous variations of the magnetic field produced by a tape head, which impresses corresponding variations of magnetization on the moving tape. In playback mode, the signal path is reversed, the tape head acting as a miniature electric generator as the varyingly magnetized tape passes over it.

Magnetic tape brought about sweeping changes in both radio and the recording industry. Sound could be recorded, erased and re-recorded on the same tape many times, sounds could be duplicated from tape to tape with only minor loss of quality, and recordings could now be very precisely edited by physically cutting the tape and rejoining it. Within a few years of the introduction of the first commercial tape recorder—the Ampex 200 model, launched in 1948—American musician-inventor Les Paul had invented the first multitrack tape recorder, ushering in another technical revolution in the recording industry. Tape made possible the first sound recordings totally created by electronic means, opening the way for the bold sonic experiments of the Musique Concrète school and avant garde composers like Karlheinz Stockhausen, which in turn led to the innovative pop music recordings of artists such as Frank Zappa, The Beatles and The Beach Boys.

The ease and accuracy of tape editing, as compared to the cumbersome disc-to-disc editing procedures previously in some limited use, together with tape's consistently high audio quality finally convinced radio networks to routinely prerecord their entertainment programming, most of which had formerly been broadcast live. Also, for the first time, broadcasters, regulators and other interested parties were able to undertake comprehensive audio logging of each day's radio broadcasts. Innovations like multitracking and tape echo allowed radio programs and advertisements to be produced to a high level of complexity and sophistication. The combined impact with innovations such as the endless loop broadcast cartridge led to significant changes in the pacing and production style of radio program content and advertising.

=== Stereo and hi-fi ===
Magnetic tape enabled the development of the first practical commercial sound systems that could record and reproduce high-fidelity stereophonic sound. The experiments with stereo during the 1930s and 1940s were hampered by problems with synchronization. A major breakthrough in practical stereo sound was made by Bell Laboratories, who in 1937 demonstrated a practical system of two-channel stereo, using dual optical sound tracks on film. Major movie studios quickly developed three-track and four-track sound systems, and the first stereo sound recording for a commercial film was made by Judy Garland for the MGM movie Listen, Darling in 1938.

The first commercially released movie with a stereo soundtrack was Walt Disney's Fantasia, released in 1940. The 1941 release of Fantasia used the Fantasound sound system. This system used a separate film for the sound, synchronized with the film carrying the picture. The sound film had four double-width optical soundtracks, three for left, center, and right audio—and a fourth as a control track with three recorded tones that controlled the playback volume of the three audio channels. Because of the complex equipment this system required, Disney exhibited the movie as a roadshow, and only in the United States. Regular releases of the movie used standard mono optical 35 mm stock until 1956, when Disney released the film with a stereo soundtrack that used the Cinemascope four-track magnetic sound system.

EMI (UK) was the first company to release commercial stereophonic tapes. They issued their first Stereosonic tape in 1954. Others quickly followed, under the His Master's Voice and Columbia labels. 161 Stereosonic tapes were released, mostly classical music or lyric recordings. RCA imported these tapes into the US. Two-track stereophonic tapes were more successful in America during the second half of the 1950s. They were duplicated at real time (1:1) or at twice the normal speed (2:1) when later 4-track tapes were often duplicated at up to 16 times the normal speed, providing a lower sound quality in many cases. Early American 2-track stereophonic tapes were very expensive. A typical example is the price list of the Sonotape/Westminster reels: $6.95, $11.95 and $17.95 for the 7000, 9000 and 8000 series respectively. Some RCA tapes released in the USA also cost up to $15. Record companies mixed most popular music singles into monophonic sound until the mid-1960s—then commonly released major recordings in both mono and stereo until the early 1970s. Many Sixties pop albums now available only in stereo were originally released only in mono, and record companies produced the stereo versions of these albums by simply separating the two tracks of the master tape.

Magnetic tape transformed the recording industry. By the early 1950s, most commercial recordings were mastered on tape instead of recorded directly to disc. Tape facilitated a degree of manipulation in the recording process that was impractical with mixes and multiple generations of directly recorded discs. An early example is Les Paul's 1951 recording of How High the Moon, on which Paul played eight overdubbed guitar tracks. In the 1960s Brian Wilson of The Beach Boys, Frank Zappa, and The Beatles (with producer George Martin) were among the first popular artists to explore the possibilities of multitrack recording techniques and effects on their landmark albums Pet Sounds, Freak Out!, and Sgt. Pepper's Lonely Hearts Club Band.

The compact cassette became a major consumer audio format and advances in electronic and mechanical miniaturization led to the development of the Sony Walkman, a pocket-sized cassette player introduced in 1979. The Walkman was the first personal music player and it gave a major boost to sales of prerecorded cassettes, which became the first widely successful release format that used a re-recordable medium: the vinyl record was a playback-only medium and commercially prerecorded tapes for reel-to-reel tape decks, which many consumers found difficult to operate, were never more than an uncommon niche market item.

== Timeline ==
- 1874 : Elisha Gray's Musical Telegraph
- 1876 : Alexander Graham Bell completed his designs for the telephone
- 1877 : Thomas Edison and Emile Berliner simultaneously invented the first prototypes of the phonograph
- 1888 : Thomas Edison introduces the electric motor-driven phonograph
- 1896 : Edwin S. Votey completes the first Pianola
- 1898 : Valdemar Poulsen patents the Telegraphone
- 1906 : Thaddeus Cahill introduces the Telharmonium to the public
- 1906 : Lee De Forest invented the Triode, the first vacuum tube
- 1910 : Vladimir Baranoff-Rossine constructed the Piano Optophonique
- 1912 : Major Edwin F. Armstrong is issued a patent for a regenerative circuit, making radio reception practical
- 1915 : Lee de Forest created the Audion Piano
- 1917 : Leon Theremin invented the prototype of the Theremin
- 1921 : First commercial AM radio Broadcast made by KDKA, Pittsburgh, PA
- 1926 : Jorge Mager presented his electronic instruments, in the Spharaphon line
- 1927 : Pierre Toulon and Krugg Bass invent the Cellulophone
- 1928 : René Bertrand invents the Dynaphone
- 1928 : Fritz Pfleumer patents a system for recording on paper coated with a magnetizable, powdered steel layer. A precursor to tape.
- 1929 : Nikolay Obukhov commissioned Michel Billaudot and Pierre Duvalie to design the Sonorous Cross
- 1929 : Peter Lertes and Bruno Helberger developed the Hellertion
- 1930 : Robert Hitcock completes the Westinghouse Organ
- 1931 : George Beauchamp, the general manager of the National Guitar Corporation, developed one of the earliest electric guitars.
- 1934 : Laurens Hammond created the first Hammond Organ
- 1935 : Yamaha releases Magna Organ, an early electrostatic reed organ
- 1935 : Paul Tutmarc invents the electric bass (but the instrument does not attract buyers until Leo Fender developed the Precision Bass in the 1950s

== See also ==
- EBow
- Frippertronics
- Gizmotron
- Moodswinger
- Prepared guitar
- Tape loop
- Third bridge
