= Timeline of music technology =

The timeline of music technology provides the major dates in the history of electric music technologies inventions from the 1800s to the early 1900s and electronic and digital music technologies from 1874 to the 2010s.

== Dates ==
- 1874 : Elisha Gray's Musical Telegraph
- 1876 : Alexander Graham Bell completed his designs for the telephone. This device contributed to electric technologies that would subsequently be used in music technology
- 1877 : The microphone was first invented by David Edward Hughes, despite Thomas Edison being granted the patent. Hughes discovered that electrical currents varied when sound vibrations were passed through carbon packed into a confined space. His first broadcast was of scratching insects.
- 1877 : Thomas Edison and Emile Berliner simultaneously invented the first prototypes of the phonograph
- 1888 : Thomas Edison introduces the electric motor-driven phonograph
- 1896 : Edwin S. Votey completes the first Pianola
- 1898 : Valdemar Poulsen patents the Telegraphone
- 1906 : Thaddeus Cahill introduces the Telharmonium to the public
- 1906 : Lee De Forest invented the Triode, the first vacuum tube
- 1910 : Utah Mormon and Nathaniel Baldwin construct the first set of headphones from an operator's headband and copper wire. Baldwin failed to commercialize the opportunity through attracting orders from private companies and even the Smithsonian Institution, though the Navy purchased hundreds of sets of them in anticipation of possible world war.
- 1910 : Vladimir Baranoff-Rossine constructed the Piano Optophonique
- 1912 : Major Edwin F. Armstrong is issued a patent for a regenerative circuit, making radio reception practical
- 1915 : Lee de Forest created the Audion Piano
- 1917 : Leon Theremin invented the prototype of the Theremin, an instrument which is played without touching it, as it detects the proximity of the hands
- 1921 : First commercial AM radio Broadcast made by KDKA, Pittsburgh, PA
- 1925 : The Victor Orthophonic Victrola Phonograph was invented. A far superior product in comparison to other phonograph manufacturers was an acoustic sound design that was far superior to current offerings.
- 1926 : Jorge Mager presented his electronic instruments, in the Spharaphon line
- 1927 : Pierre Toulon and Krugg Bass invent the Cellulophone
- 1928 : René Bertrand invents the Dynaphone
- 1928 : Fritz Pfleumer patents a system for recording on paper coated with a magnetizable, powdered steel layer, precursor to tape
- 1929/c. 1934: Laurens Hammond created the first Hammond Organ
- 1929 : Nikolay Obukhov commissioned Michel Billaudot and Pierre Duvalie to design the Sonorous Cross
- 1929 : Peter Lertes and Bruno Helberger developed the Hellertion
- 1930 : Robert Hitcock completes the Westinghouse Organ
- 1930 : Freidrich Trautwein invents the Trautonium
- 1931 : RCA-Victor began manufacturing 33 1/3 vinyl record players. The Great Depression unfortunately made the market unreceptive due to their high cost and initial marketing of these devices being as "Program Transcriptions", rather than for listening to music. Despite their existence, it was not until 1948 that Columbia Records reintroduced this format.
- 1931 : Alan Blumlein, working for EMI in London, in effect, patents stereo
- 1932 : Nicholas Langer built the Emicon
- 1932 : Yevgeny Alexandrovith Sholpo constructed the Variophone
- 1932 : Harry F. Olson patents the first cardioid ribbon microphone
- 1933 : Ivan Eremeef invents the Gnome
- 1934 : Milton Taubman constructed the Electronde
- 1935 : BASF prepares first plastic-based magnetic tapes
- 1936 : Harald Bode designed the Warbo Formenn Organ
- 1936 : Oskar Vierling and Winston Kock designed the Grosstonorgel
- 1937 : Orson Welles, first director to use studio electronics, during his broadcast of The War of the Worlds
- 1938 : Georges Jenny develops the Ondioline
- 1938 : Benjamin B. Baur of Shure Bros. engineers a single microphone element to produce a cardioid pickup pattern (it picks up less sounds from the sides of the microphone, reducing unwanted sound pickup)
- 1939 : Homer W. Dudley invented the Parallel Bandpass Vocoder
- 1940 : Karl Wagner early development of Voice Synthesizers, precursors of the vocoder
- 1940 : Homer W. Dudley introduced the Voder Speech Synthesizer
- 1940 : The Hammond Organ Company releases the Solovox
- 1941 : Commercial FM broadcasting begins in the US
- 1944 : Halim El-Dabh produces The Expression of Zaar, the earliest piece of electroacoustic tape music
- 1944 : Harold Rhodes built the first prototype of the Rhodes Piano
- 1945 : The Hammond Organ Company commissioned John Hanert to design the Hanert Synthesizer
- 1946 : Jennings Musical Instruments releases the Univox
- 1946 : Raymond Scott patented the Orchestra Machine
- 1947 : Constant Martin constructed the Clavioline
- 1948 : Bell Laboratories reveals the first transistor
- 1948 : The microgroove 33-1/3 rpm vinyl record (LP) is introduced by Columbia Records
- 1951 : Pultec introduces the first passive program equalizer, the EQP-1
- 1952 : Harry F. Olson and Herbert Belar invent the RCA Synthesizer
- 1952 : Osmand Kendal develops the Composer-Tron for the Canadian branch of the Marconi Wireless Company
- 1955 : Ampex develops “Sel-Sync” (Selective Synchronous Recording), making audio overdubbing practical
- 1956 : Les Paul makes the first 8-track recordings using the “sel-sync” method
- 1956 : Raymond Scott develops the Clavivox
- 1958 : First commercial stereo disk recordings produced by Audio Fidelity
- 1958 : Evgeny Murzin along with several colleagues create the ANS synthesizer
- 1958 : At Texas Instruments, Jack Kilby creates the first integrated circuit
- 1959 : Daphne Oram develops a programming technique known as Oramics
- 1959 : Wurlitzer manufactures The Sideman, the first commercial electro-mechanical drum machine
- 1963 : The Mellotron starts to be manufactured in London
- 1963 : Phillips introduces the Compact Cassette tape format
- 1963 : Paul Ketoff designs the SynKet
- 1964 : The Moog synthesizer is released
- 1968 : King Tubby pioneers dub music, an early form of popular electronic music
- 1970 : ARP 2600 is manufactured
- 1971 : Busicom's Masatoshi Shima and Intel's Federico Faggin complete 4004, the first commercial microprocessor
- 1977 : Apple founder Steve Jobs introduces Apple II, an early home computer
- 1981 : IBM introduces the IBM PC, a 16-bit personal computer
- 1982 : Sony and Philips introduce the compact disc
- 1982 : First MIDI synthesizers released, Roland Jupiter-6 and Prophet 600
- 1983 : Introduction of MIDI, unveiled by Roland's Ikutaro Kakehashi and Sequential Circuits' Dave Smith
- 1984 : Apple markets the Macintosh computer
- 1985 : Atari releases the Atari ST computer, designed by Shiraz Shivji
- 1986 : The first digital consoles appear
- 1987 : Digidesign markets Sound Tools

=== Japan-specific timeline ===
This section shows the Japan-specific timeline of music technology.
Note: Some items in the list are not the first even in Japan.

- 1934 : NEC engineer Akira Nakishima's switching circuit theory lays foundations for digital circuit design
- 1935 : Yamaha releases Magna Organ, an early electrostatic reed organ
- 1963 : Keio Electronics (later Korg) produces the DA-20, an earliest electronic drum machine in Japan
- 1964 : Ikutaro Kakehashi debuts Ace Tone R-1 Rhythm Ace, their first electronic drum
- 1965 : Nippon Columbia patents their early electronic drum machine
- 1966 : Korg releases Donca-Matic DE-20, an early electronic drum machine
- 1967 : Ace Tone releases FR-1 Rhythm Ace, the first electronic drum machine to enter popular music
- 1967 : First PCM recorder developed by NHK
- 1968 : Sharp engineer Tadashi Sasaki conceives single-chip microprocessor
- 1968 : Release of Shin-ei's Uni-Vibe, designed by Fumio Mieda, an effects pedal with phase shift and chorus effects
- 1969 : Matsushita engineer Shuichi Obata invents first direct-drive turntable, Technics SP-10
- 1972 : Sord Computer Corporation develop Sord SMP80/08, an early microcomputer
- 1973 : Yamaha releases the Yamaha GX-1, the first polyphonic synthesizer
- 1974 : Yamaha builds the first digital synthesizer
- 1976 : Boss, a Roland subsidiary, releases Boss CE-1 Chorus Ensemble, the first chorus pedal
- 1977 : Roland release MC-8 Microcomposer, their early microprocessor-driven CV/Gate digital sequencer
- 1977 : Sord Computer Corporation introduces Sord M200, an early home computer
- 1977 : Panafacom releases the Lkit-16, an early 16-bit microcomputer
- 1978 : Roland releases CR-78, the first microprocessor-driven drum machine
- 1979 : Casio releases VL-1, the first commercial digital synthesizer
- 1980 : Fujio Masuoka invents flash memory at Toshiba
- 1980 : Roland releases TR-808, a widely used drum machine in popular music
- 1980 : Roland introduces DCB protocol and DIN interface with TR-808
- 1980 : Yamaha releases GS-1, the first FM digital synthesizer
- 1980 : Kazuo Morioka creates Firstman SQ-01, the first bass synthesizer with a music sequencer
- 1981 : Roland founder Ikutaro Kakehashi conceives MIDI
- 1981 : Roland releases TB-303, a bass synthesizer that lays the foundations for acid house music
- 1981 : Toshiba's LMD-649, Japanese first PCM digital sampler, introduced with Yellow Magic Orchestra's Technodelic
- 1983 : Roland releases TR-909, the first MIDI drum machine
- 1983 : Yamaha releases DX7, the first commercially successful digital synthesizer The Yamaha DX7 goes on to become one of the best-selling synthesizers in history, selling more than 200,000 units.
- 1983 : Roland releases MSQ-700, their first MIDI sequencer
- 1985 : Akai releases the Akai S612, a digital sampler
- 1988 : Akai introduces the Music Production Controller (MPC) series of digital samplers
- 1990 : The music production program Logic Pro was created by German software developer C-Lab, which later became known as Emagic.
- 1994 : Yamaha unveils the ProMix 01
- 2002: Apple acquires Logic Pro

== See also ==
- Sound recording
