= Electric grand piano =

Musical instrument

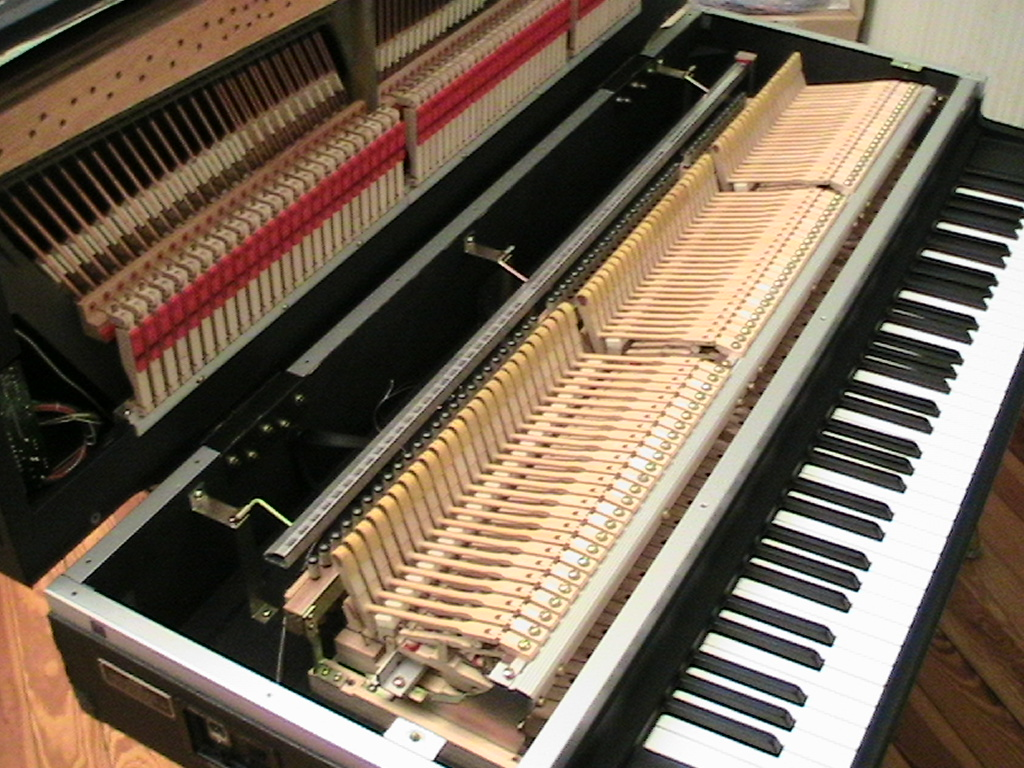
Inside view of a Yamaha CP-70

The electric grand piano is a stringed musical instrument played using a keyboard, in which the vibration of strings struck by hammers is converted by pickups into electrical signals, analogous to the electric guitar's electrification of the traditional guitar.

Since electric amplification eliminates the need for a resonant chamber, electric grand pianos are smaller and lighter (around 300 pounds (140 kg)), and consequently more portable, than acoustic pianos. Electric amplification also bypasses the difficulty of having to mic a conventional grand piano, and thus makes an electric grand easier to set up with a sound system.

== History ==
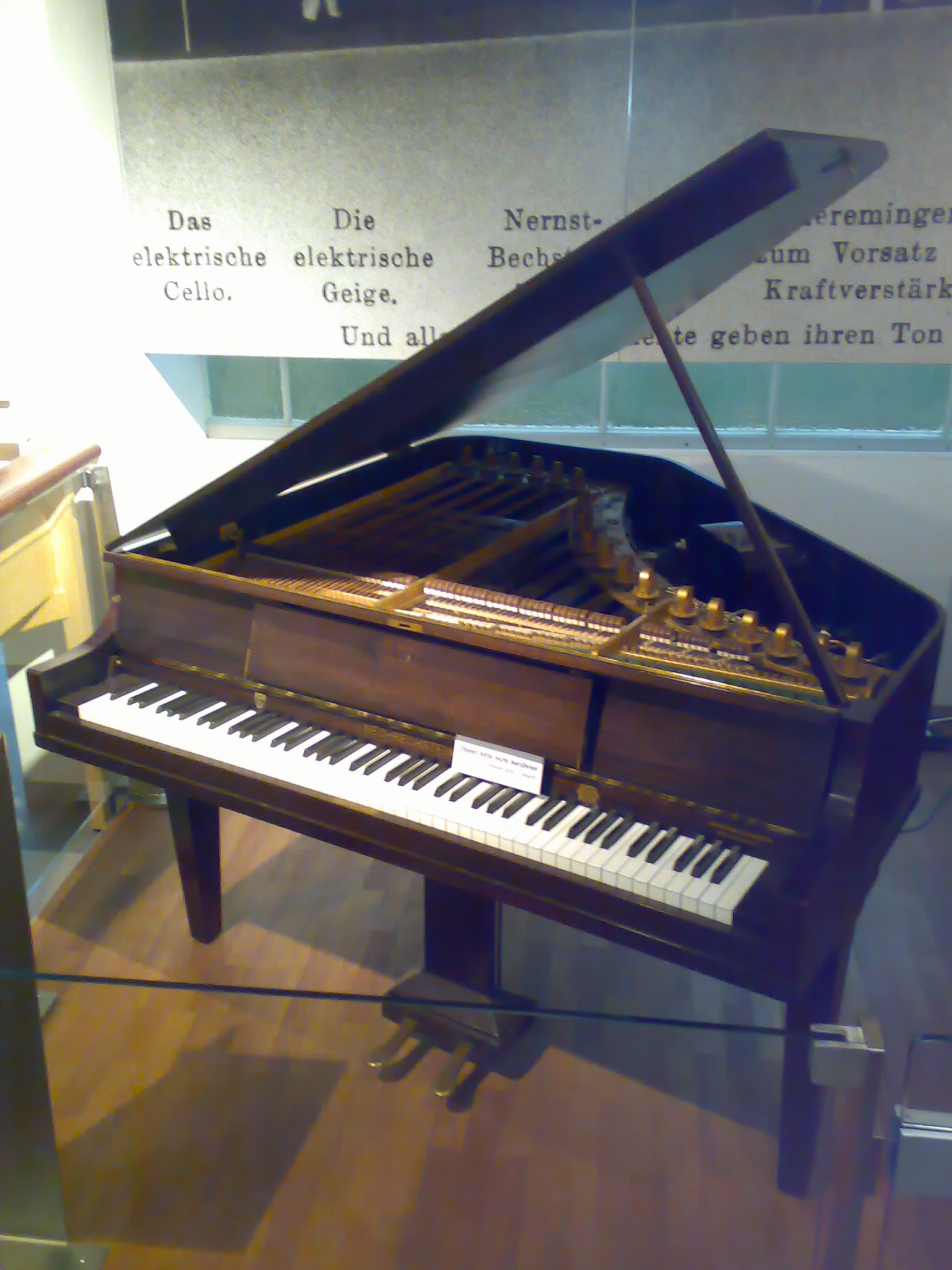
Neo-Bechstein (1929)

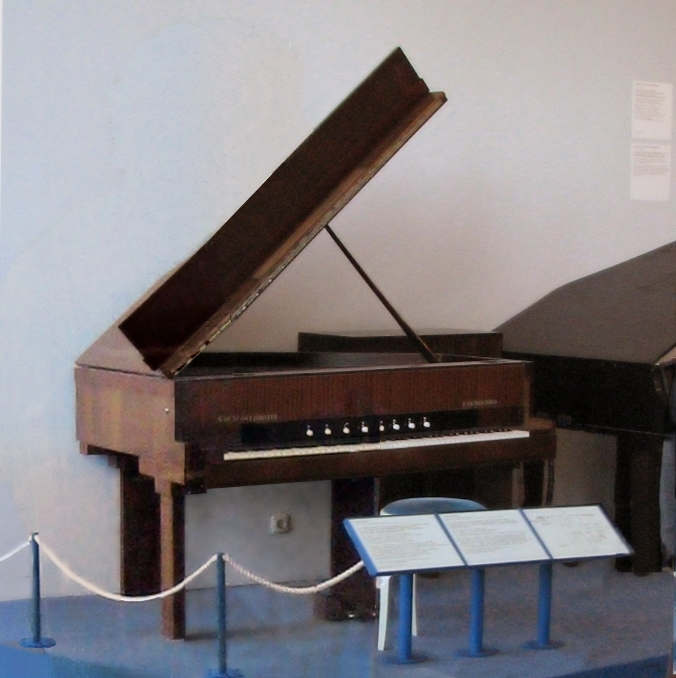
Vierling-Förster piano (1937)

Experimental efforts to electrify the grand piano began in the late 1920s with the Neo-Bechstein. In 1939, the first commercially available model, the RCA Storytone, was introduced. These instruments featured the traditional hammered-string mechanism with pickups instead of a soundboard. In subsequent decades, other instruments now referred to as electric pianos were developed and saw wider use; these differ from electric grand pianos in that they produce sound by hammers striking metal tuning forks or reeds rather than strings. In the 1970s, hammered-string electric pianos returned to commercial production, beginning with Yamaha's CP-70 and CP-80, followed by models by Kawai Musical Instruments and Helpinstill.

In the 1980s, with the advent of the digital piano, the electric grand piano declined in popularity, and production ultimately ceased. The electric grand sound survives as part of the official General MIDI specification, with most instrument manufacturers licensing the CP-70 and/or -80 sound from Yamaha.

== Notable users ==
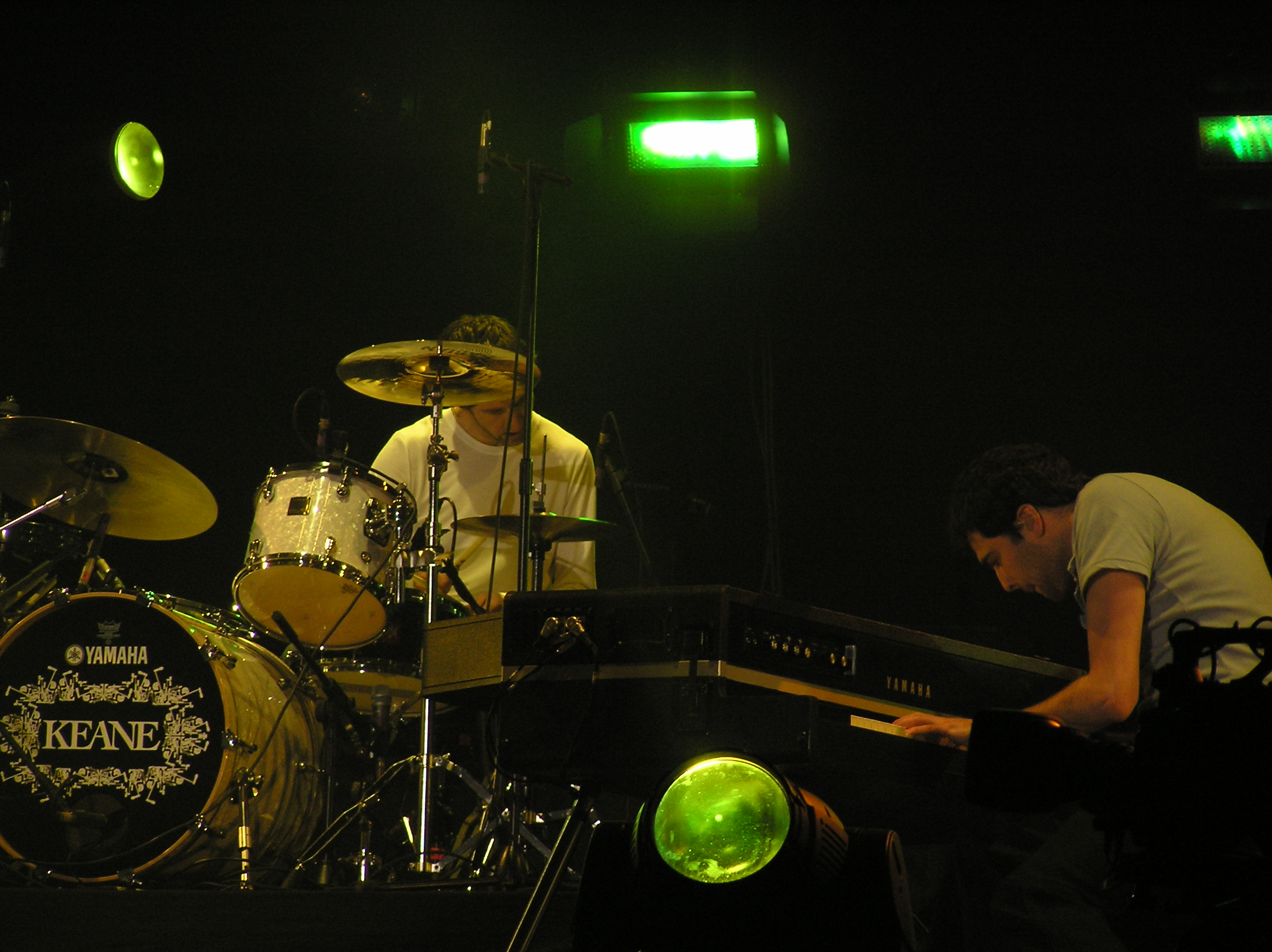
Tim Rice-Oxley of Keane playing a Yamaha CP-70 on stage

In 1939, U.S. dance band leader Shep Fields was using an RCA Storytone with his ensemble.

The English alternative rock band Keane use the Yamaha CP-70, and it is band member Tim Rice-Oxley's primary instrument. Lead singer Tom Chaplin also used a Yamaha CP-60, a smaller and upright variant of the CP-70, during the Under The Iron Sea era of the band. Swedish soloartist Jack L. Stroem and the band Tokyo Keys also use the CP-70 (with guitar effects pedals and amplifiers) as an integral component of its sound. Michael Curtes of Polite Sleeper plays a CP-70B as his primary keyboard in live performances.

Tony Banks of Genesis used a Yamaha CP-70 from 1978 to the late 1980s in the band's music and his solo work, as did his bandmates Phil Collins and Peter Gabriel in their respective solo careers.

Other notable users of the Yamaha CP series pianos include Billy Joel ("My Life", "All for Leyna", "I Don't Want to Be Alone", "Sleeping with the Television On", "Pressure", "Surprises"); Joe Zawinul, Steve Hillier of Dubstar, who wrote all three of the band's albums for EMI on his CP-70B; Guilherme Arantes; Split Enz keyboard player Eddie Rayner, who played a CP-80 regularly throughout the group's most successful period in the early-mid 1980s; Vangelis; George Duke; Benny Andersson of ABBA; Mick MacNeil of Simple Minds; D'Angelo; the Edge of U2; Prince; Keith Emerson of Emerson, Lake & Palmer; Keith Godchaux and Brent Mydland of the Grateful Dead; Hall & Oates ("Kiss on My List", "Private Eyes", "Did It in a Minute"); Rainbow ("Since You Been Gone"); Roxy Music ("Oh Yeah"); Toto ("Hold the Line"); Foreigner ("Waiting for a Girl Like You"); Kerry Livgren of Kansas ("Lonely Wind"); Alicia Keys ("Girl on Fire") and Aaron Morgan of Seabird.

== Notable models ==
=== Helpinstill ===
- Roadmaster 64 (64-note upright)
- Roadmaster 88 (88-note upright)
- Portable Grand (88-note grand)

=== Kawai ===
- EP-608 (75-note upright)
- EP-705M (75-note upright with MIDI output)
- EP-308 (88-note grand)
- EP-308M (as EP-308 but with MIDI output)

=== Yamaha ===
- CP-60M (76-note upright with MIDI output)
- CP-70 (73-note grand)
- CP-70B (like CP-70 with revised action and electronics including balanced outputs)
- CP-70D (like CP-70B; 73-key grand with 7-band graphic equalizer rather than Bass/Mid/Treble controls)
- CP-70M (like CP-70D; 73-key grand with MIDI output)
- CP-80 (like CP-70B; 88-key and balanced outputs)
- CP-80D (like CP-80B; 88-key grand with 7-band graphic equalizer rather than Bass/Mid/Treble controls)
- CP-80M (like CP-80D; 88-key grand with MIDI OUT)
- E201/E-202 (76-key upright with built-in amplifier and speakers but no MIDI out)
- E-501/E-502 (88-key upright with built-in amplifier and 3 speakers but no MIDI out)

== See also ==
- Electric piano
- Helpinstill
- Kawai Musical Instruments
- List of Yamaha Corporation products
