= Charles Ezra =

Charles Ezra may refer to:

- Charles Ezra Beury (1879–1953), American second president of Temple University
- Charles Ezra Daniel (1895–1964), American politician and Army officer during World War I
- Charles Ezra Greene (1842–1903), American civil engineer
- Charles Ezra Sprague (1842–1912), American accountant, and Union Army officer during the American Civil War

== See also ==
- Ezra Charles (born 1944), American singer, pianist, songwriter, bandleader, and founder of company Helpinstill, which makes portable amplified pianos for stage performance
