= Vierling =

Vierling may refer to:

== People ==
- Vierling C. Kersey, California State Superintendent of Public Instruction in the 1930s
- Alfred Vierling (born 1949), Dutch politician and activist
- Christine Nordhagen-Vierling (born 1971), Canadian wrestler
- Georg Vierling, German musician and composer (1820–1901)
- Johann Gottfried Vierling, German organist and composer (1750–1813)
- Matt Vierling (born 1996), American baseball player
- Oskar Vierling (1904–1986), German physicist and inventor of the Elektrochord
- Wilhelm Johannes Vierling (1889–1956), mayor of German city of Leipzig in 1945

== Other ==
- Vierling (firearm) (German for "quadruplet"), a combination gun with four barrels
