= Feuerstein Castle =

Castle in Forchheim, Bavaria, Germany

Coordinates: 49°47′08″N 11°09′45″E

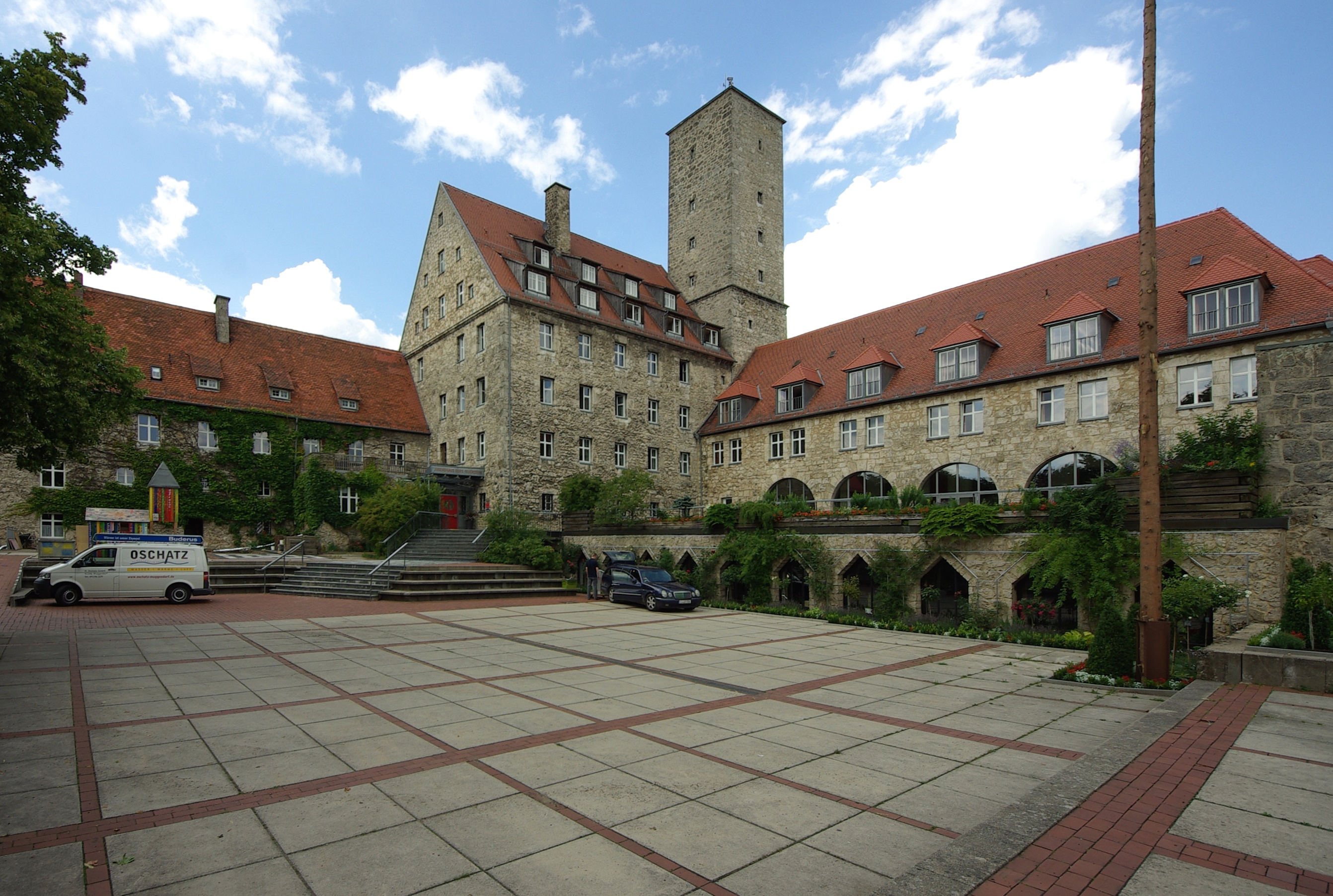
Feuerstein Castle in 2011

Feuerstein Castle (German: Burg Feuerstein) lies at the edge of the so-called Lange Meile near Ebermannstadt in the county of Forchheim in the south German state of Bavaria. It was built in 1941 by Oskar Vierling as a laboratory for researching High Frequency technology and electroacoustics and was used until 1945 by 250 employees for research into weapons and communication technology as part of the German armaments programme during the Second World War.

At the end of the war the castle was seized by American soldiers, from 1946 it was rented by the Archdiocese of Bamberg under Jupp Schneider and sold in 1949. Since then the castle and the entire estate have been in use as a Roman Catholic youth and conference centre.

== History ==
Oskar Vierling was looking for a central location for his laboratories. The choice fell on a hill called the Feuerstein. Its design as a castle blended well into the countryside of Franconian Switzerland and was chosen for camouflage reasons. During the war it was disguised as a hospital and had tiles in the form of a red cross on the roof, but actually housed a laboratory for secret Nazi armament projects. After the end of the war it was abandoned and construction plans and documents were destroyed. Nevertheless, in 2011 a document came into the hands of cryptographer-historian, Norbert Ryska, from the American special unit, Ticom (Target Intelligence Committee), which described the work of Vierling at Feuerstein Castle in more detail. According to this, Vierling worked for the Nazis on speech encoding methods, acoustic torpedo control, acoustic detonation of mines, anti-detection technology for U-boats and in the fields of radio and electrotechnology.

A relict of its construction period is the present wine cellar, formally a walk-in safe with a ten-centimetre-thick steel door. The charm of the castle comes not from any medieval origin, but from its wartime history and its young age.

The castle has been expanded by dormitory accommodation, a dining hall, leisure facilities (Kegelbahn, table tennis, volleyball, hard court, sports field), conference rooms, camping sites, agriculture, a riding stable and a glider airfield. Today Feuerstein Castle is a modern youth facility owned by the Diocese of Bamberg.

In 1999 Feuerstein Observatory was founded, 500 metres south of Feuerstein Castle Airfield. The observatory took the name of the castle. The tower of the castle is used by the observatory as a microwave radio relay relay station to link it to the town of Ebermannstadt in the valley. In this way the tower built by Vierling to test the first radio relay link continues to fulfil its original purpose.

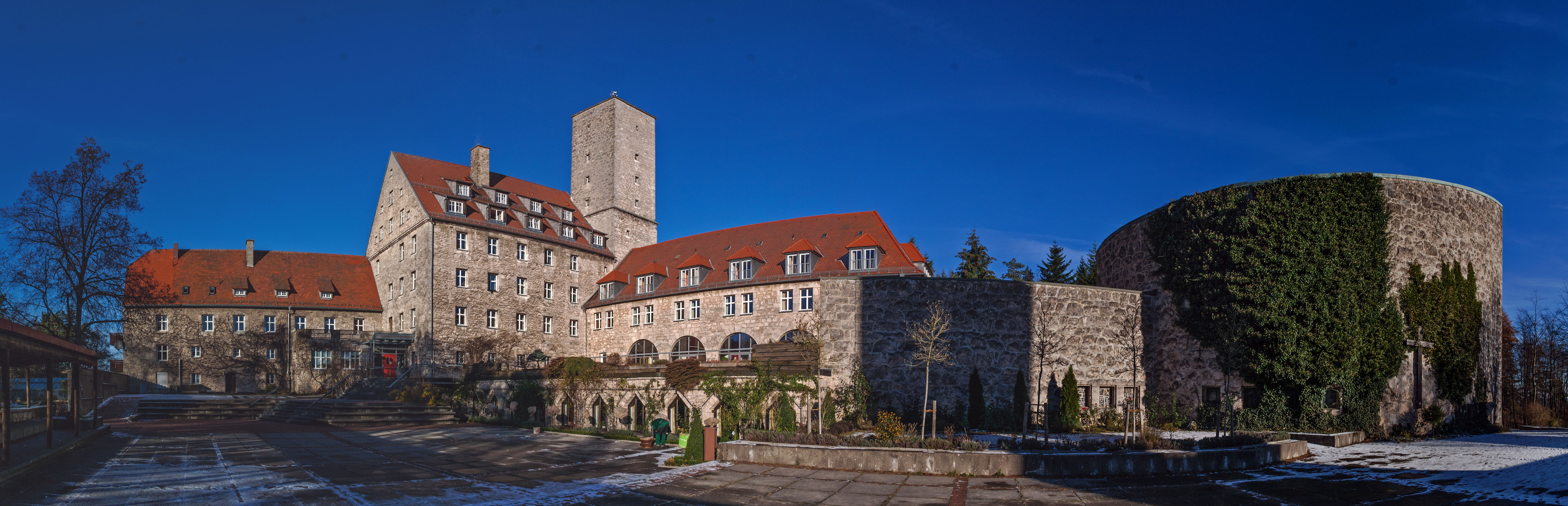
Panorama of Feuerstein Castle, November 2013

== The churches ==
In 1961 the Church of the Transfiguration of Jesus was opened. It consists of three spaces: the crypt, the lower church and the upper church. The crypt is accessed by steps from the lower church and only dimly lit. It houses the eternal flame and the tabernacle. On the sides of the tabernacle are twelve candlesticks which represent the twelve apostles.

The lower church is dedicated to Mary, the "Mother of Wisdom". It has an altar, behind which is a mural portraying the Litany of the Blessed Virgin Mary. The glass windows are kept dark and portray on one side the head of a beast of prey, fire, broken ears of corn and the reaper, and on the other side, people, a rainbox, the sun and angels' wings. Both the mural and the window are works by the artist, Alfred Heller, from Bamberg. After leaving the lower church, the path runs past windows that portray the fundamental attitudes of Christian spirituality: Oratio – Meditatio – Contemplatio ("prayer - meditation - contemplation").

The upper church was designed by the architect Heinzmann and cathedral master builder Schädel. It was consecrated in 1961 and constructionally anticipated the liturgical reform of the Second Vatican Council a year later: the altar is positioned in the nave so that the priest can celebrate mass with the congregation. The large glass wall portrays on its right-hand side, the Burning Bush (Ex 3) and on the left the sacrifice of Elijah (1 Kings 18). The glass wall is a work by glass artist, Georg Meistermann. The Stations of the Cross were created in 2005 by a youth group.

== See also ==
- Jugendburg
