= Electric piano =

Electro-mechanical keyboard musical instrument

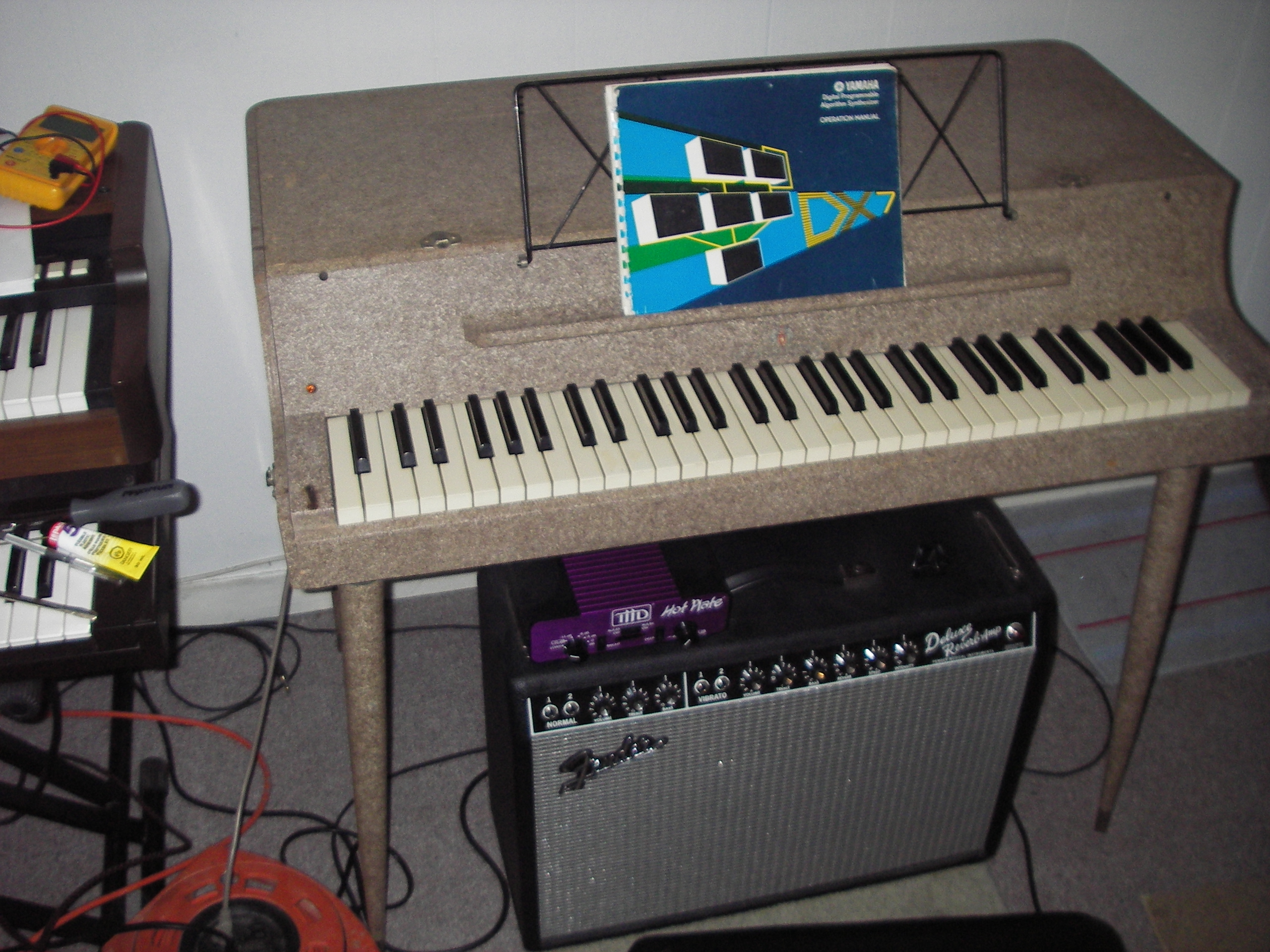
A Wurlitzer model 112 electric piano with a guitar amplifier

An electric piano is a musical instrument that has a piano-style musical keyboard, where sound is produced by means of mechanical hammers striking metal strings or reeds or wire tines, which leads to vibrations which are then converted into electrical signals by pickups (either magnetic, electrostatic, or piezoelectric). The pickups are connected to an instrument amplifier and loudspeaker to reinforce the sound sufficiently for the performer and audience to hear.

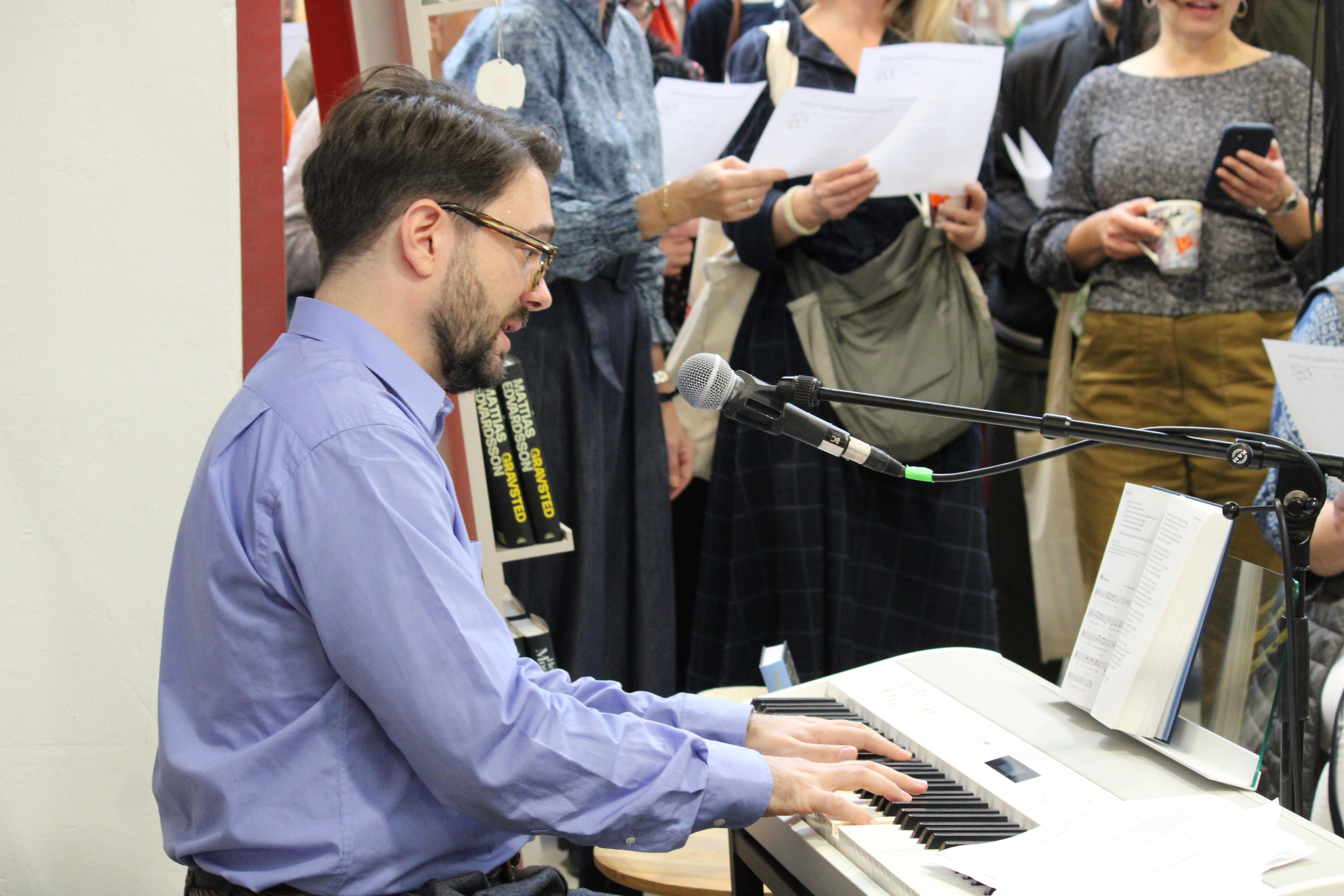
Phillip Faber playing an electric piano in Copenhagen, 2025

== History ==
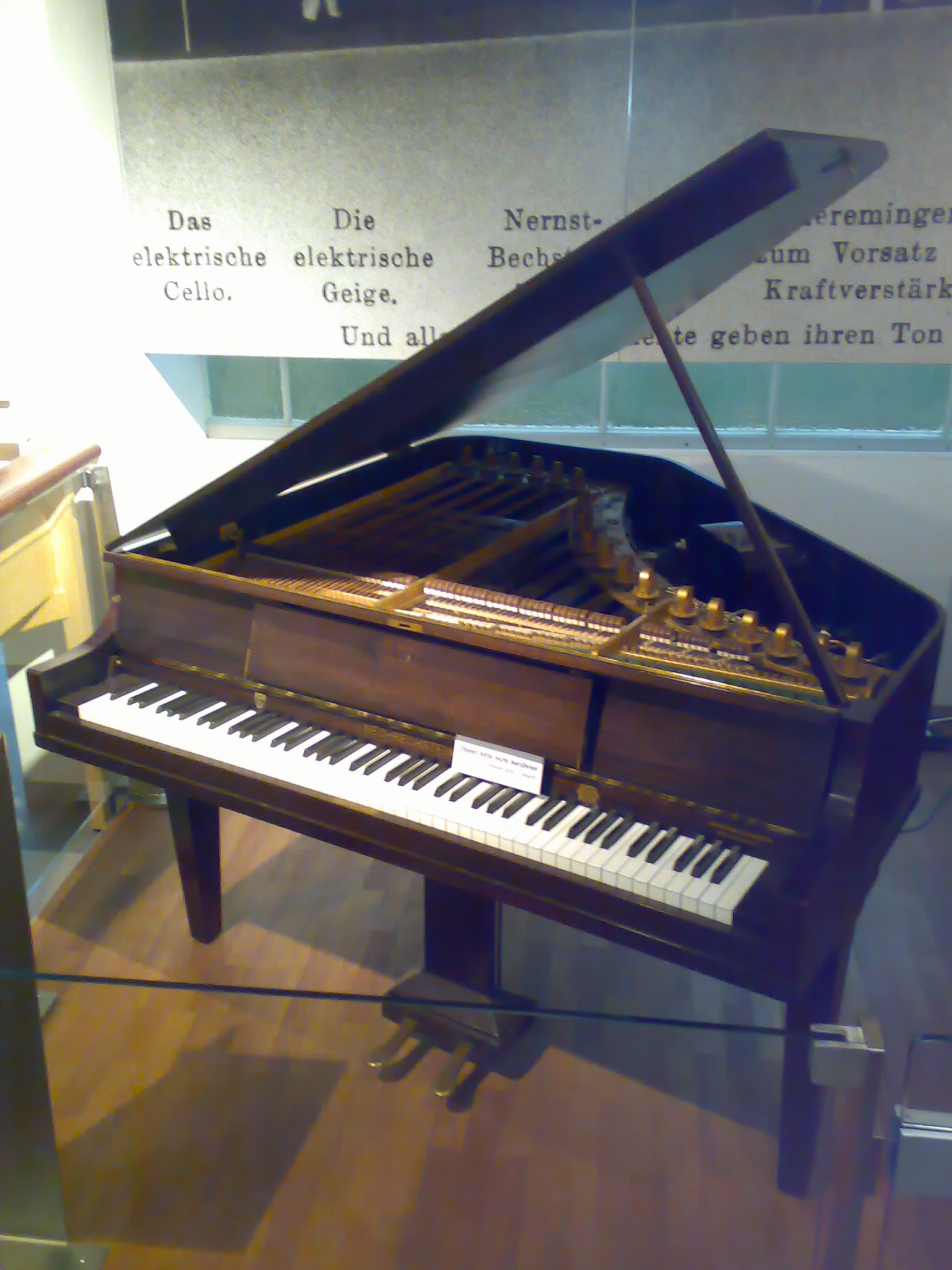
Neo-Bechstein (1931)

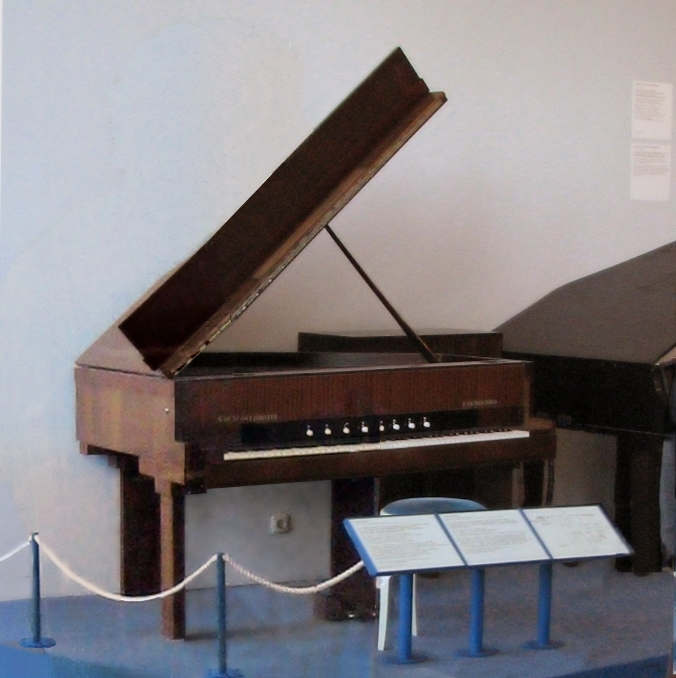
Vierling-Förster piano (1937)

[[File:Storytone electric piano (1939) by Story & Clark and RCA, art deco design by John Vassos, MIM PHX.jpg|136px]]
Storytone (1939) by Story & Clark and RCA

The Neo-Bechstein electric piano was built in 1931. The Vierlang-Forster electric piano was introduced in 1937. The RCA Storytone electric piano was built in 1939 in a joint venture between Story & Clark and RCA. The case was designed by John Vassos, the American industrial designer. It debuted at the 1939 World's Fair.

== Types ==
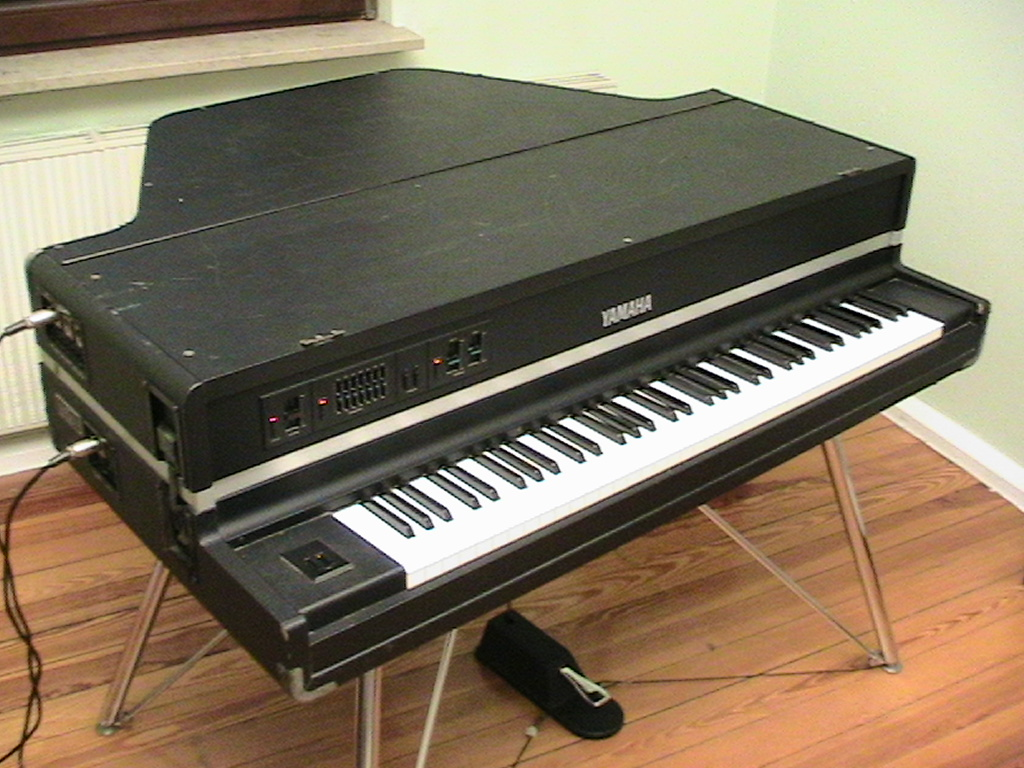
Yamaha CP-70M

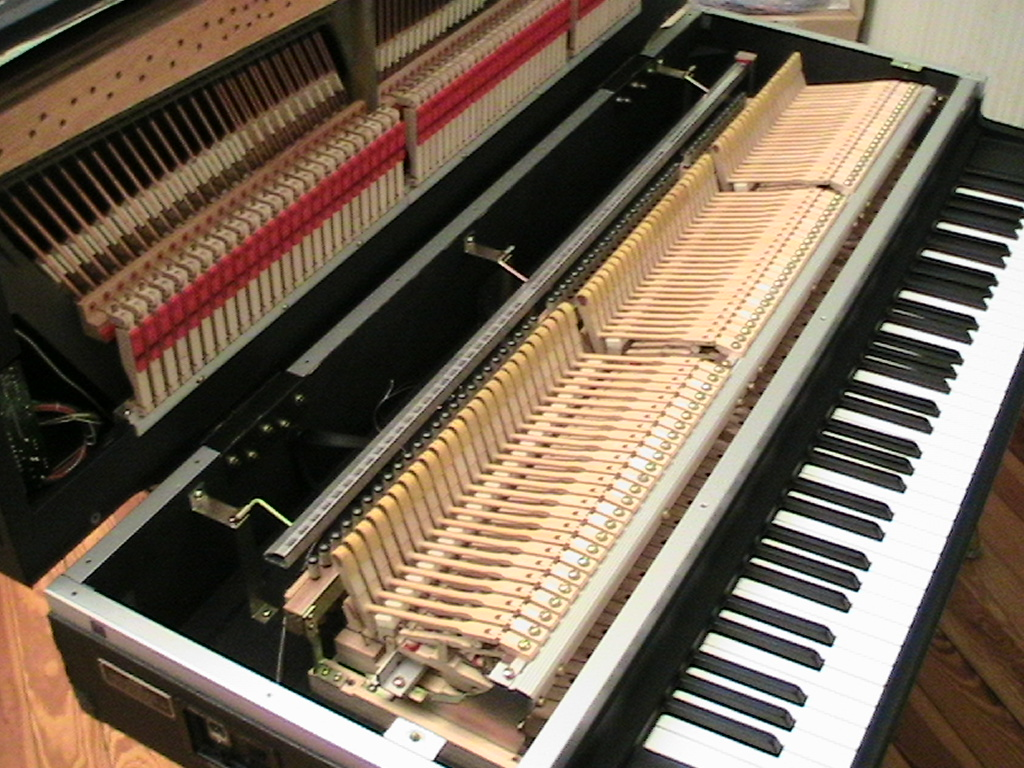
Strings and hammers of Yamaha CP-70

The term "electric piano" can refer to several different instruments which vary in their sound-producing mechanisms and consequent timbral characters.

=== Struck strings ===
Yamaha, Baldwin, Helpinstill and Kawai's electric pianos are actual grand or upright pianos with strings and hammers. The Helpinstill models have a traditional soundboard; the others have none, and are more akin to a solid-body electric guitar.

On Yamaha's pianos, such as the CP-70, the vibration of the strings is converted to an electrical signal by piezoelectric pickups under the bridge. Helpinstill's instruments use a set of electromagnetic pickups attached to the instrument's frame. All these instruments have a tonal character similar to that of an acoustic piano.

=== Struck reeds ===
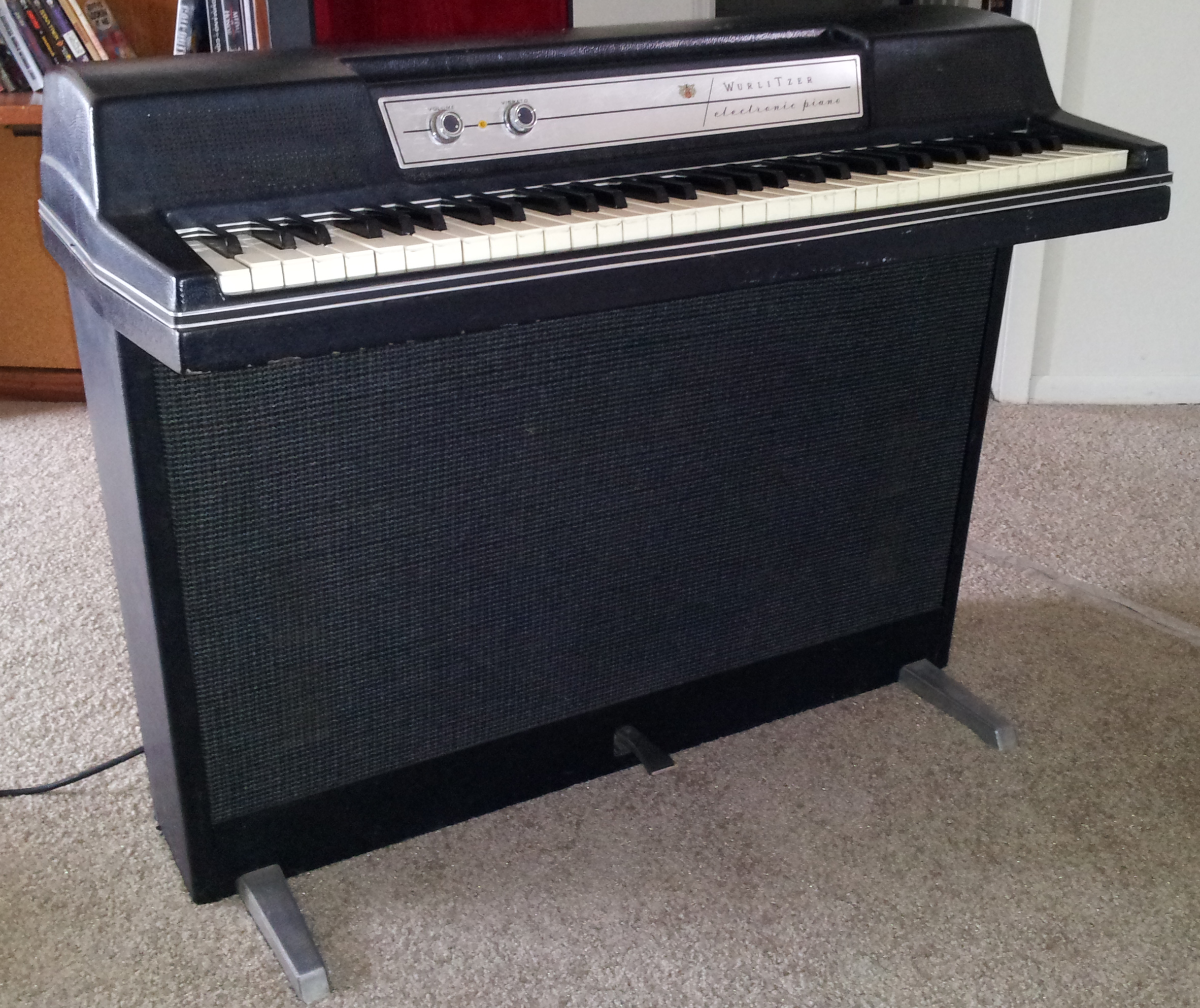
Wurlitzer EP-210

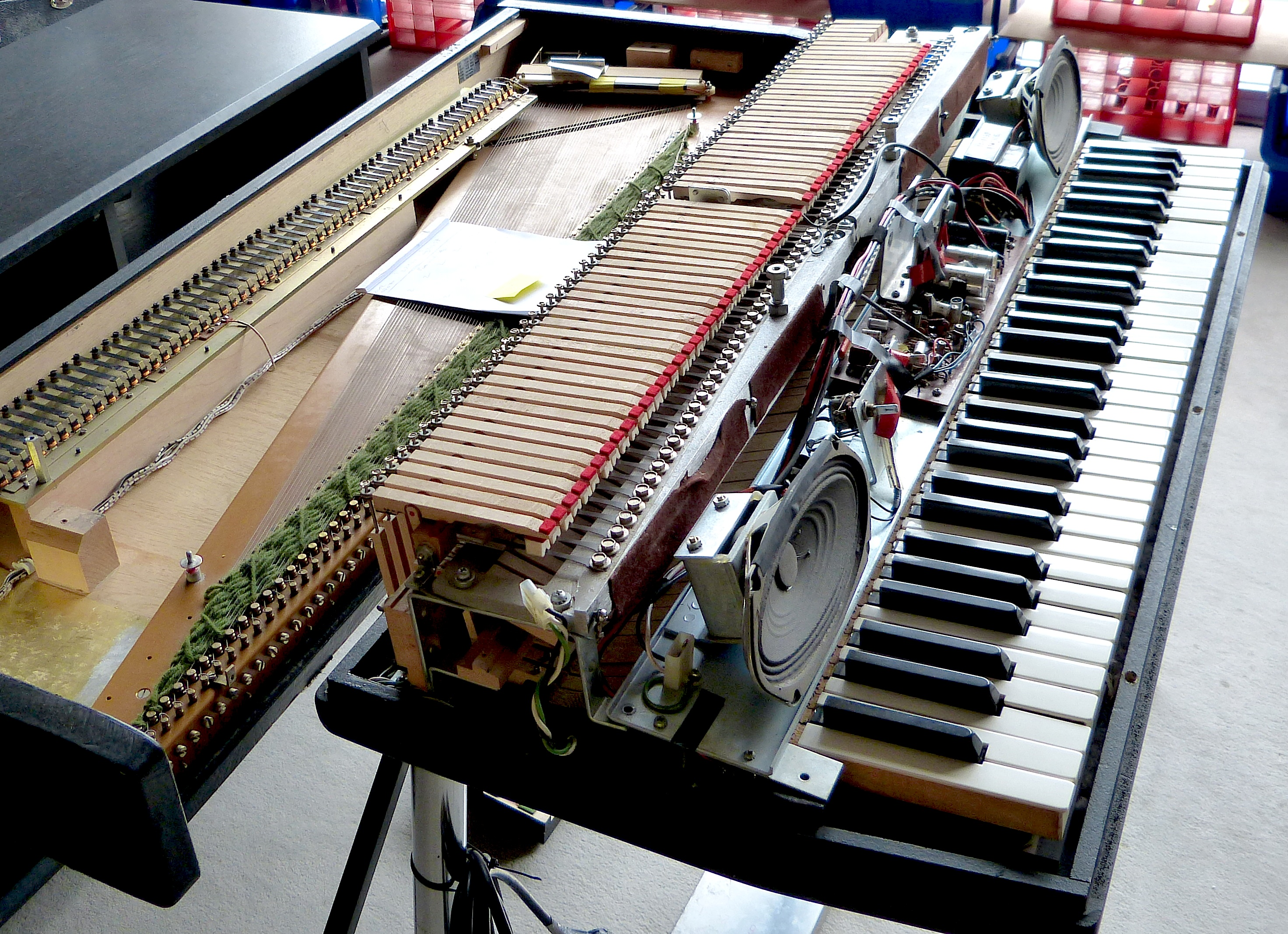
Struck reeds of a Wurlitzer electric piano (shown here with the hard cover removed)

Wurlitzer electronic pianos (sometimes called "Wurli" as a nickname) use flat steel reeds struck by felt hammers. The reeds fit within a comb-like metal plate, and the reeds and plate together form an electrostatic or capacitive pickup system. The reeds are tuned by adding or removing mass from a lump of solder at the free end of the reed. Replacement reeds are furnished with a slight excess of solder, and thus tuned "flat"; the user is required – by repeated trial and error – to gradually file off the excess solder until the correct tuning is achieved.

In 2015, Brazilian inventor Tiago Valente created the first prototype of the Valente Electric Piano, an electromechanical instrument where the hammers strike reeds, similar to the ones used in a Wurlitzer. In 2020, the Valente Electric Piano was launched commercially; at the time of launch, Valente said that he took inspiration from the Suette Piano, another reed electric piano that was made in Brazil in the 1980s.

=== Struck tuning-forks ===
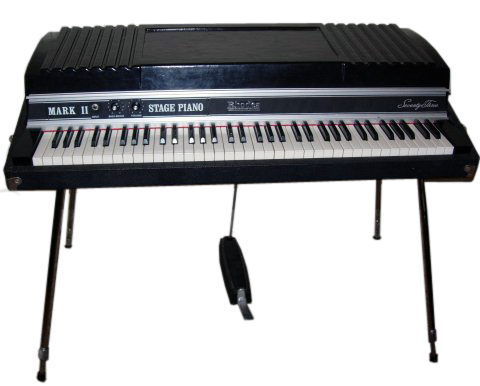
Rhodes Mark II Stage 73

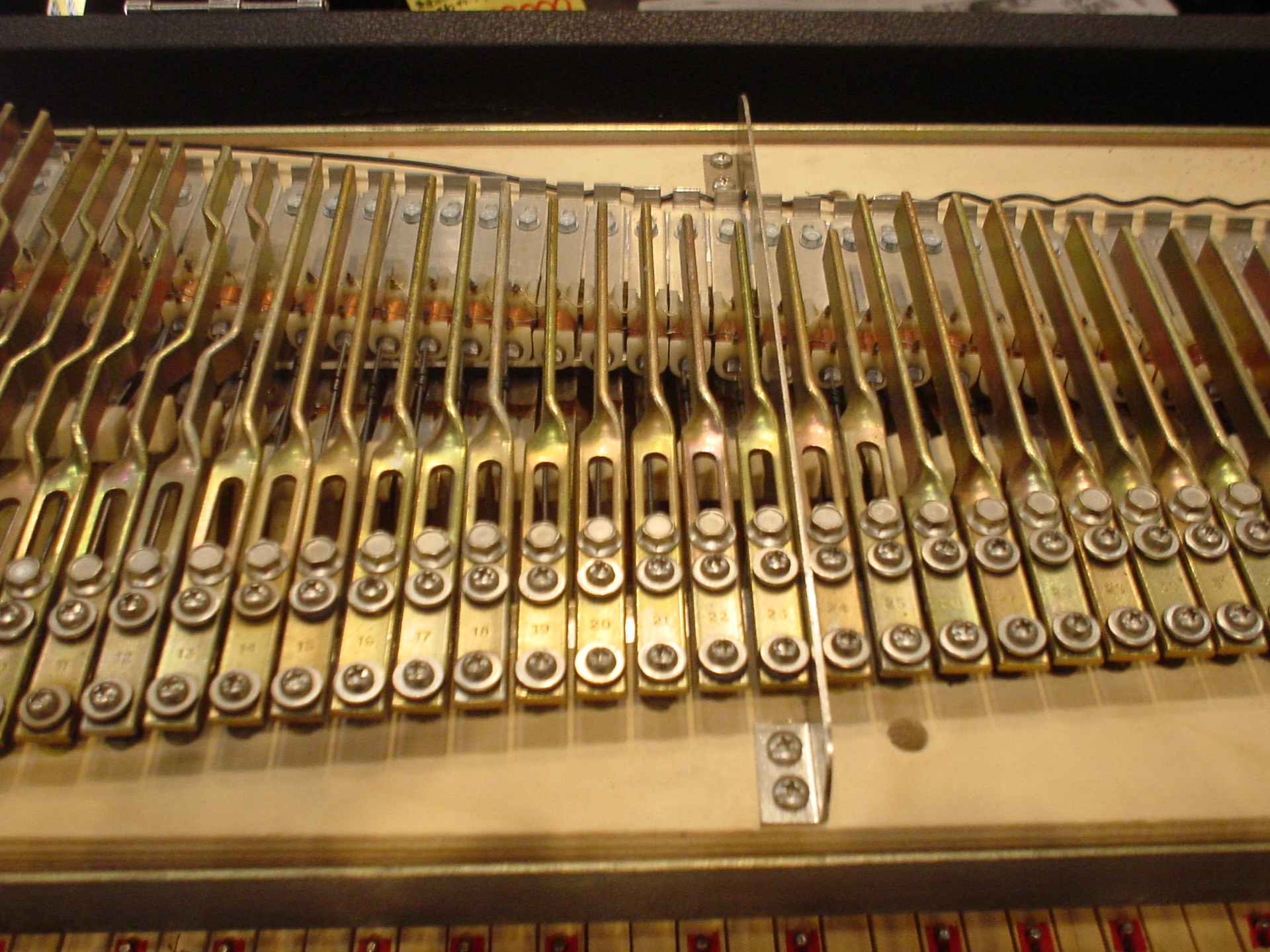
Tuning forks of Fender Rhodes Mark I

The tuning fork here refers to the struck element having two vibrating parts. In Fender Rhodes instruments, the struck portion of the "fork" is a tine of stiff steel wire. The other part of the fork, parallel and adjacent to the tine, is the tonebar, a sturdy steel bar which acts as a resonator and adds sustain to the sound. The tine is fitted with a spring which can be moved along its length to allow the pitch to be varied for fine-tuning.

=== Plucked reeds ===
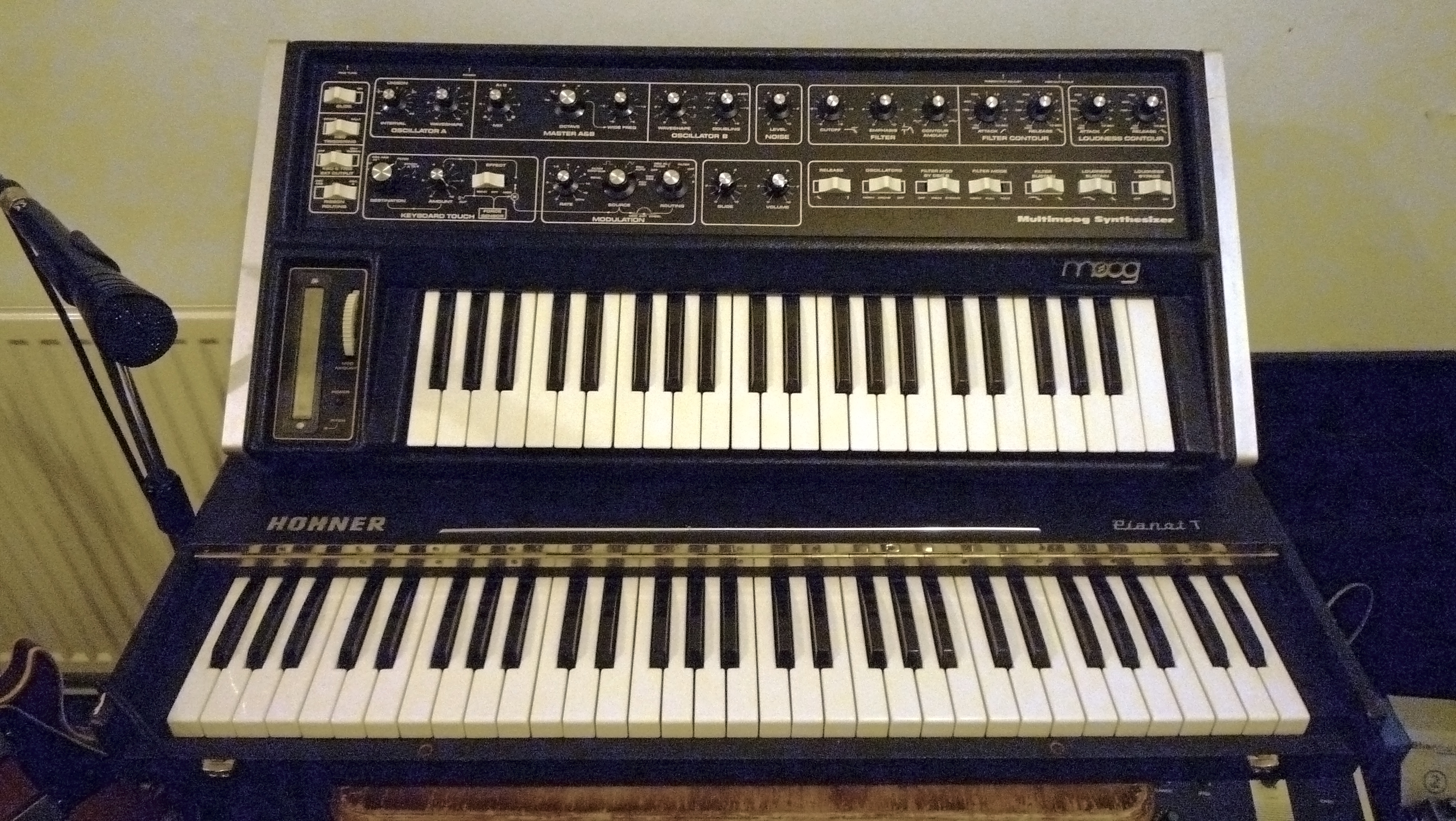
Hohner Pianet (below)

The Hohner Pianet uses adhesive pads made from an undressed leather surface cushioned by a foam rubber backing. Hohner's later "Pianet T" uses silicone rubber suction pads rather than adhesive pads and replaces the electrostatic system with passive electromagnetic pickups similar to those of the Rhodes.

=== Other electric keyboard instruments ===
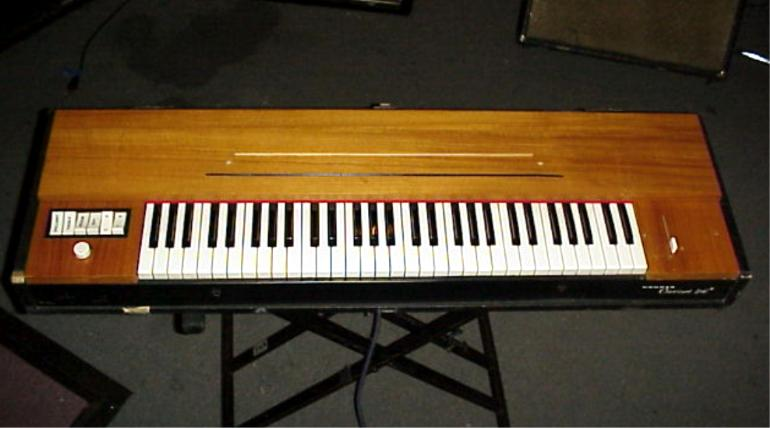
Hohner Clavinet D6

Tangent action of a Clavinet :
1. Tuning / 2. Damper / 3. Tangent / 4. Anvil / 5. Key / 6. String / 7. Pickup / 8. Tailpiece

Hohner's "Clavinet" is essentially an electric clavichord. A rubber pad under each key presses the string onto a metal anvil, causing the "fretted" portion of the string to vibrate. This is detected by a series of pickups, which convert them into an electrical signal.

== Digital pianos ==
Digital pianos that provide an emulated electric piano sound have largely supplanted the actual electro-mechanical instruments in the 2010s, due to the small size, light weight, and versatility of digital instruments, which can produce a huge range of tones besides piano tones (e.g., emulations of Hammond organ sounds, synthesizer sounds, etc.). However, some performers still perform and record with vintage electric pianos. In 2009, Rhodes produced a new line of electro-mechanical pianos, known as the Rhodes Mark 7, followed by an offering from Vintage Vibe.

== See also ==
- Clavichord
- Hammond organ
- Harpsichord
- String synthesizer
- Celesta
- DX7 Rhodes
- Electric guitar
- Rocksichord
