= Oskar Vierling =

German physicist, inventor and entrepreneur

Oskar Walther Vierling
- Born: 24 January 1904; Straubing
- Died: 1986 (aged 81–82)
- Education: Technische Hochschule Nürnberg in Nuremberg.

Oskar Walther Vierling (born 24 January 1904 in Straubing, died 1986) was a German physicist, inventor, entrepreneur and professor in high-frequency technology. Vierling was an important inventor and engineer of electronic and electro-acoustic instruments between the 1930s and 1950s.

== Life ==
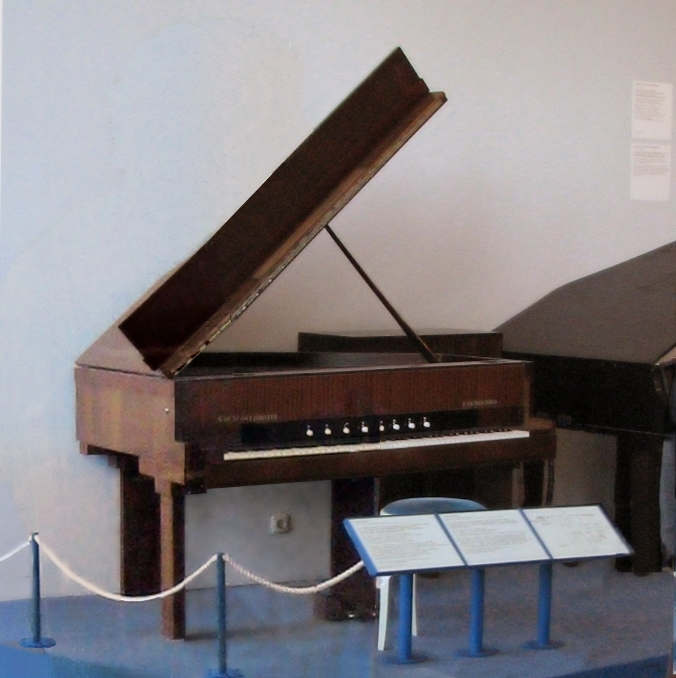
Electro chord in the Deutsches Museum, Munich

Oskar Vierling attended school in Regensburg, and graduated with the Obersekundareife. In 1925 he graduated as an engineer at the Technische Hochschule Nürnberg in Nuremberg in Nuremberg, and later attending the Telegrafen technische Reichsamt in Berlin. Vierling then took a position at the Heinrich Hertz Institute. Fritz Sennheiser was his student and joined him in the founding of the high-frequency institute of the University of Hannover.

Vierling was married and had two sons. The children took over the kind of Vierling Group.

== Career ==
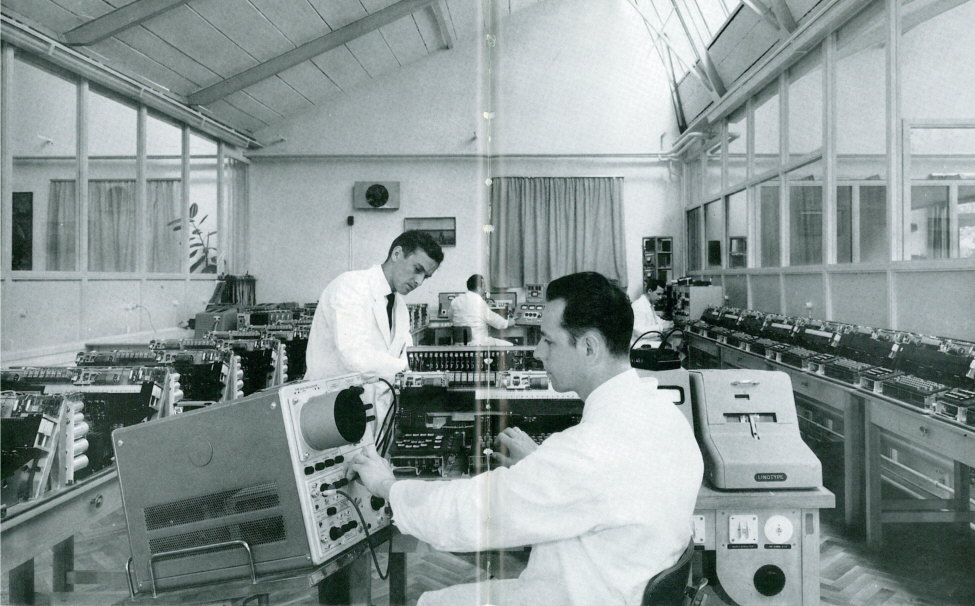
Testing and measuring technology production of the Vierling Group in Ebermannstadt (early 1960s)

In 1929, Vierling along with Walther Nernst, created the Neo-Bechstein Electric Grand piano design, that divided the strings into groups of five, with their own electrostatic pickups. With amplification the strings were thinner and shorter. The Neo-Bechstein piano was eventually manufactured by the C. Bechstein piano factory company in 1932 after completion of development, but proved a commercial disappointment due to financial difficulties in the Bechstein company.

In 1932, Vierling worked with Benjamin Miessner to design and invent the Elektrochord piano, for the August Förster company. The Elektrochord was one of the first electric pianos, whereupon the vibrations of the struck string by the hammer, were electronically recorded and then amplified. The sound was controllable in that it was configurable to provide a range from a salon grand piano to a full concert grand piano.

In 1925, Vierling was promoted to Phd with a thesis titled, The Electroacoustic Piano. In 1938, Vierling was promoted to a full professorship at the Technical University of Hannover, and founded an Institute for the study of high-frequency technology and electro-acoustics.

== Wehrmacht ==
In 1941, he was commissioned by the Wehrmacht to create the Vierling Group. For this high frequency and electroacoustic armament research, Vierling built the research laboratory Feuerstein Castle in Ebermannstadt, which was located centrally in Germany and disguised as a Franconian castle and hospital. While at the Feuerstein Castle, Vierling developed the first directional radio lines and tested and developed the control for the acoustically controlled G7es torpedo, Torpedo Wren (German: Torpedo Zaunkönig) and later Torpedo Vulture (German: Geier entwickelt). Vierling worked with Erich Hüttenhain at the OKW/Chi, Werner Liebknecht who was Director of Engineering at Referat Wa Prüf 7 of the Waffenamt and Erich Fellgiebel Chief of Wehrmacht communications. Vierling worked with Hüttenhain, Liebknecht and Fellgiebel on the Hazardo machine. This machine was supposed to generate a random sequence of teleprinter letters on a normal teleprinter tape. Such a key-hole tape could not be easily duplicated by also directly used for telex encryption or for deriving statistical letters or numerical sequences. Vierling also worked on the improvement of the encryption machine, Lorenz SZ 42. Vierling later worked on the testing of the acoustic ignition of mines, and collaborated in the invention of an anti-radar coating for submarines, with the code name chimney sweep. In addition, Vierling and his team developed radios and electric calculators. Another area that Vierling and his team were working on was ciphony. Of the six methods the lab developed during the period of World War II to achieve secure voice, none were found to be successful and Vierling failed to develop a secure voice system.

Vierling had an ambivalent relationship to Nazism. On the one hand he was a member of the Nazi party, on the other hand he worked largely independently and was negative in the party apparatus as he was not regularly present at party meetings.

== After 1945 ==
During the post war period, Vierling made his intelligence technology, including Covert listening device, available for use to the Gehlen Organization, that enabled his group to survive. In July 1950, the group working on the Hazardo device, moved in secrecy to Kransberg Castle to continue work. In October 1950, the Hazardo produced the first keyhole strip. With the completion of the device, a separate four-person working group called Schlüsselmittelherstllung was formed to exploit the device.

Between 1949 and 1955 Vierling taught as a professor of physics at the philosophical Theological College at the University of Bamberg.

The first test of the Deutsche Bundespost with transistors and later on microprocessor-based systems for mail delivery were based on Vierling work.

== Awards and honours ==
- 1980: Order of merit 1st class of the Federal Republic of Germany
- 1985: Bavarian Order of Merit
