= Vintage Vibe =

American keyboard maker

- Company type: Private
- Industry: Musical instruments
- Genre: Music
- Headquarters: Rockaway, New Jersey, United States
- Area served: Worldwide
- Products: Electric pianos
- Website: vintagevibe.com

Vintage Vibe is a manufacturer of mechanical electric pianos, based in Rockaway, New Jersey. The company also offers repair and restoration services for electric pianos, keyboard instruments and amplifiers, brand new parts for vintage electric pianos, and manufactures a modern tine-based electro-mechanical piano.

== History ==
The company started in 1997 as an instrument rental business, before switching to repairs due to difficulties competing in that market. In 2011, they started manufacturing electric pianos, similar to those manufactured by Rhodes in sound and Wurlitzer in appearances.

== Pianos ==
=== Vintage Vibe Piano ===
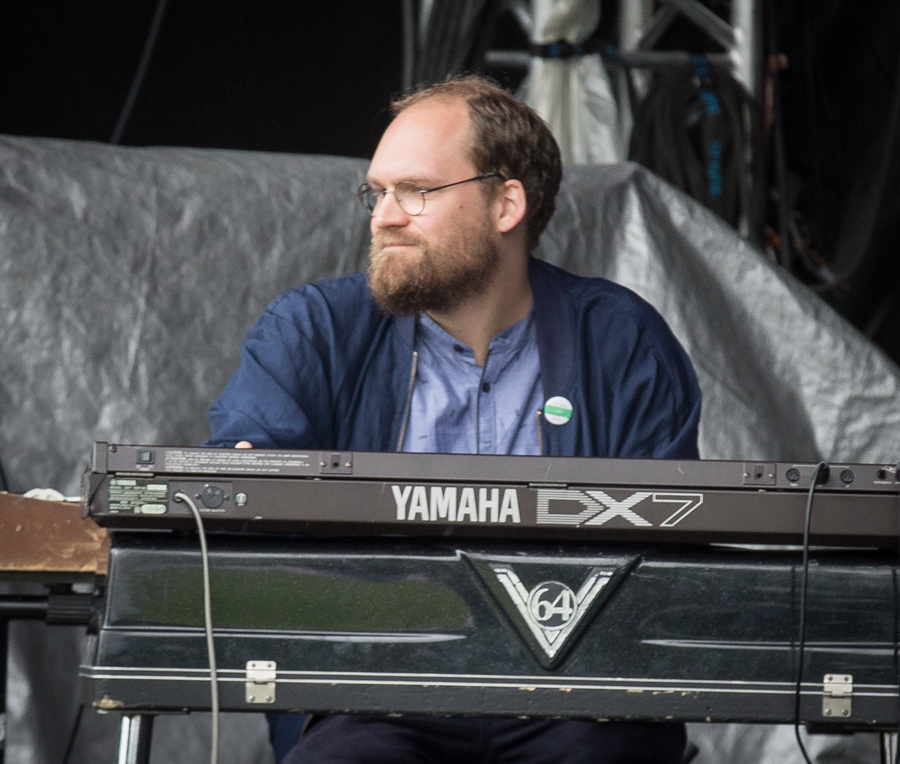
Keyboardists playing Vintage Vibe 64 Note model.

Vintage Vibe debuted their tine based piano, at the 2011 NAMM Show in Anaheim, California. The electric piano combines the sound of a Rhodes with a body that resembles a Wurlitzer Electric Piano. The Vintage Vibe Piano was designed to be half the weight of traditional tine-based electric pianos. The action and tone are inspired by the early Fender Rhodes. The piano uses American swaged steel tines and hand-wound pickups along with a choice of active or passive electronics to achieve its tone. The Vintage Vibe Piano is available in a number of different variants.

- 44 Note (F21 - C64)
- 44 Note Bass Model (C4 - G46)
- 64 Note (A13 - C76)
- 73 Note (E8 - E80)

=== Vibanet ===
The Vibanet was introduced at the 2013 NAMM Show. Unlike the tine based Vintage Vibe Piano, the Vibanet is modeled after the Hohner Clavinet, which is a string based electric clavichord. However, like the Vintage Vibe Piano, the Vibanet was made with a modern approach. Also half the weight, the Vibanet's exterior has been redesigned for a sleek look and quick access to tuning pegs.

The Vibanet features 60 keys, an autowah preamp and a revolutionary dampening system using a polymer gel rather than the yarn used by Hohner.

In actuality the vibanet was nothing more than a rehoused Hohner clavinet with a painted chassis, changed preamplifier and pickups, all placed in a black painted wooden case. Due to the lack of Clavinet parts availability and disappearing clavs and the ever rising prices- the 2 vibanets observed by reputable technicians stated this was not a new production instrument rather a rehoused one.

== Notable Users ==
- Stevie Wonder
- Chick Corea
- Greg Phillinganes
- Jeff Chimenti
- The National
- Jamiroquai
- Gregg Allman
- Peter Levin
- Christian McBride
- Richie Kotzen
- Edie Brickell
- Tom Furse of The Horrors
- John Ginty (associated with The Dixie Chicks, Jewel, Santana, Bad Religion, and Robert Randolph & The Family Band)
- Robert Glasper
- Jem Godfrey associated with Joe Satriani, Steve Vai, Atomic Kitten
- Peter Keys of Lynyrd Skynyrd
- Marcel Rodríguez-López of The Mars Volta, and Zechs Marquise
- Chris Norton of Zappa Plays Zappa
- Knut Anders Sørum
- Justin Vernon of Bon Iver & The Shouting Matches
- Pierre Chretien (SoulJazz Orchestra)
