= Ezra Charles =

American musician

Ezra Charles (born June 17, 1944, in Texarkana, Texas, United States) is the stage name of Charles Helpinstill Jr, founder of the company of the same name which makes portable amplified pianos for stage performance. A singer, pianist, songwriter, and bandleader, Charles had his start performing with Johnny Winter and Edgar Winter in Beaumont, Texas. He was also the leader of Thursday's Children, a rock band from Houston in the 1960s. He invented the Helpinstill Piano Pickup in 1972. He has led Ezra Charles and the Works band from 1983 to the present, when it is now billed as Ezra Charles' Texas Blues Band.

== Biography ==
Charles performs jump blues music with his group Ezra Charles' Texas Blues Band (formerly Ezra Charles and the Works) in and around the Houston area. His group was unusual for many years in that it did not employ an upright or electric bass. Instead, Charles played the bass notes via a MIDI device in his piano, which produces a bass note for every piano key played below the "E" below middle "C". In recent years, he has employed an upright bass player. In addition to the piano and bass, the group contains a guitar, drums, and a horn section.

Hailing now from Beaumont, Texas, Charles is the author of a song called "Beaumont Boys", which pays homage to many of the famous musicians from his hometown, including The Big Bopper, Johnny and Edgar Winter, and Harry James.

Charles is known for his lively stage show, which often features his piano catching fire during particularly "heated" performances.

== Discography ==
- Texas Bop - Rollin' Rock Switzerland (1984)
- Design for Living - Boffo Records (1989)
- Modern Years - Icarus Records (1993)
- Drive Time - Icarus Records (1996)
- Texas Style - Icarus Records (1998)
- Return of the Radio Avengers (Greatest Hits Vol. 1) - Icarus Records (1998)
- Beaumont Boy - Icarus Records (2001)
- Blues Lover - Icarus Records (2006)
- King of Texas Blues - Icarus Records (2011)

== Videography ==
- Ezra Charles and the Works Live at the Howling Coyote - Icarus Records (2006)
