= Neo-Bechstein =

Type of electric grand piano

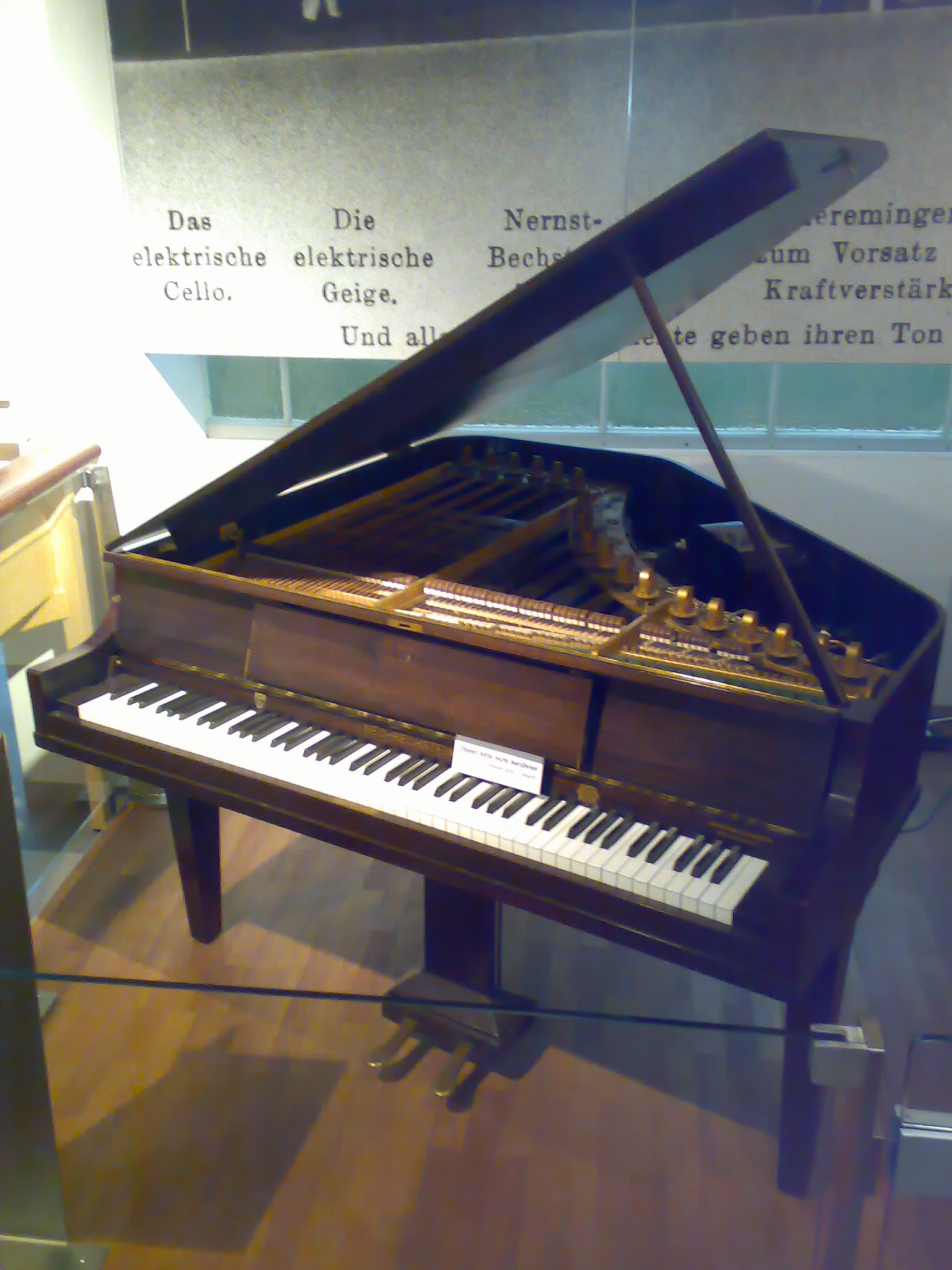
Neo-Bechstein grand piano at the Vienna Technical Museum

Neo-Bechstein or Bechstein-Siemens-Nernst-Flügel were a set of electric grand pianos that were primarily built by Walther Nernst in the 1930s. Improvising upon an electrical prototype by Oskar Vierling, the design was executed around 1922, and the first of the set was marketed in 1931 to critical acclaim. The mechanics of the piano were implemented by the C. Bechstein company and the valve electronics were created by Siemens & Halske. The design belonged to a newer generation of electric pianos that eliminated the presence of any sound board.

== Description ==
Keyboard transmission scheme for electric radio piano, describing how the micro hammer is connected to the main hammer

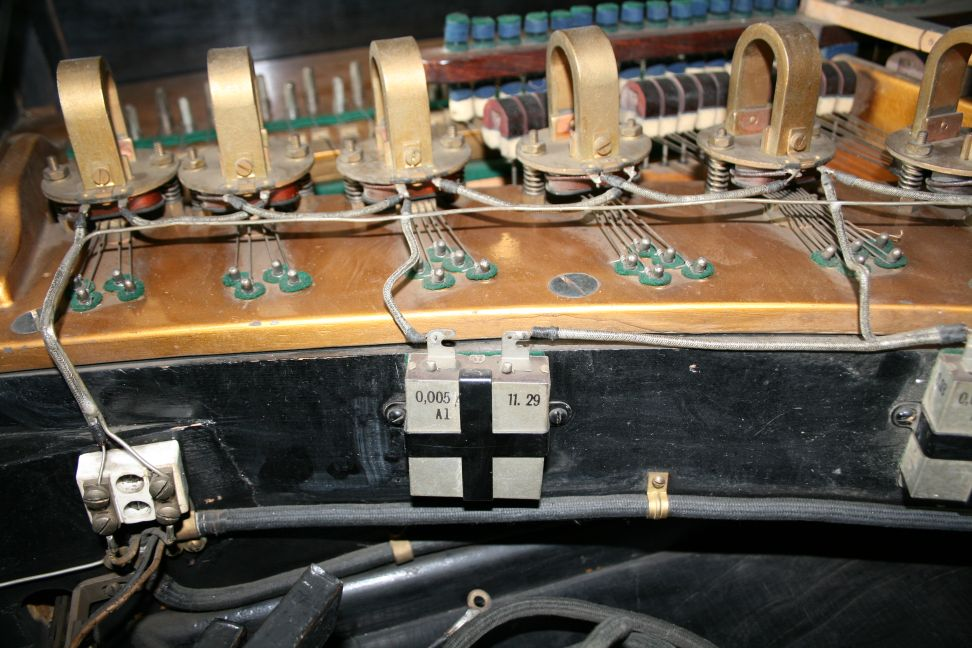
Pickup mechanism

Smaller than the dimensions of an ordinary grand piano, the Neo-Bechstein measured about 1.4 metres (4 ft 7 in) in length and belonged to a newer generation of electric pianos that eliminated the presence of any sound board.

Thinner and shorter strings were grouped into 18 clusters of 5 strings each. The clusters all converged towards a pickup followed by a membrane-less microphone. The oscillations were correspondingly transformed into electrical signals in a varying alternating current, which was made to pass through an adjustable electronic circuit comprising electron tubes, capacitors, resistors, etc., that acted as a filter. The filtered signal was then amplified with a three-tube valve amplifier and broadcast through a pre-built loudspeaker.

The absence of a sound board and its substitution by electric amplification also meant a lighter framework and a lighter hammer action, which troubled conventional piano players. This led to the usage of usual-sized hammers which struck a rail and which in turn drove a much smaller micro-hammer into the string itself. The micro hammers were invented by Hans Driescher, an employee of Nernst.

The instrument had two pedals. The right pedal acted upon the amplifier and controlled the volume levels, which – coupled with the increased sustenance power of the instrument due to its lack of a sound board – gave rise to organ-like expressive possibilities. The left pedal generated either "cembalo" or "celesta" sound. The instrument also had a speaker-cabinet fitted with a radio and a phonograph.

== Sound ==
The resulting sound was noted to be distinctly different from that of an acoustic piano. The absence of a sound board coupled with the usage of micro-hammers not only led to a reduction in sound-amplification that increased the quality of sound but also lessened damping, producing an increase in its sustaining power.

The Neo-Bechstein was one of the pioneer devices to feature a clear demarcation between the musical instrument itself and the loudspeaker, in that the mechanics of the piano were no longer involved in the direct production of sound, unlike existing electric pianos. Furthermore, the quality of the loudspeakers was good enough to not have any characteristic sound of their own. The instrument ushered in a new stage in acoustics development, wherein microphones and loudspeakers functioned well enough in stand-alone manner to be exploited for different approaches at the same time (reproducing and supporting).

== Manufacture ==
The Czech piano manufacturer Petrof, founded by Antonín Petrof in the town of Hradec Králové, acquired the license for the production of the instrument in 1932. These were named and marketed in similar manner to the C. Bechstein, as the neo-Petrof.

Estimates of the number of Neo-Bechstein pianos produced differ widely, from 150 to 15–20. Nernst sought a single cash payment for his design but instead received a royalty-fee offer from Siemens and Bechstein. Two functioning copies exist, one of which is displayed in the Vienna Technical Museum.
