= August Förster =

German piano manufacturer

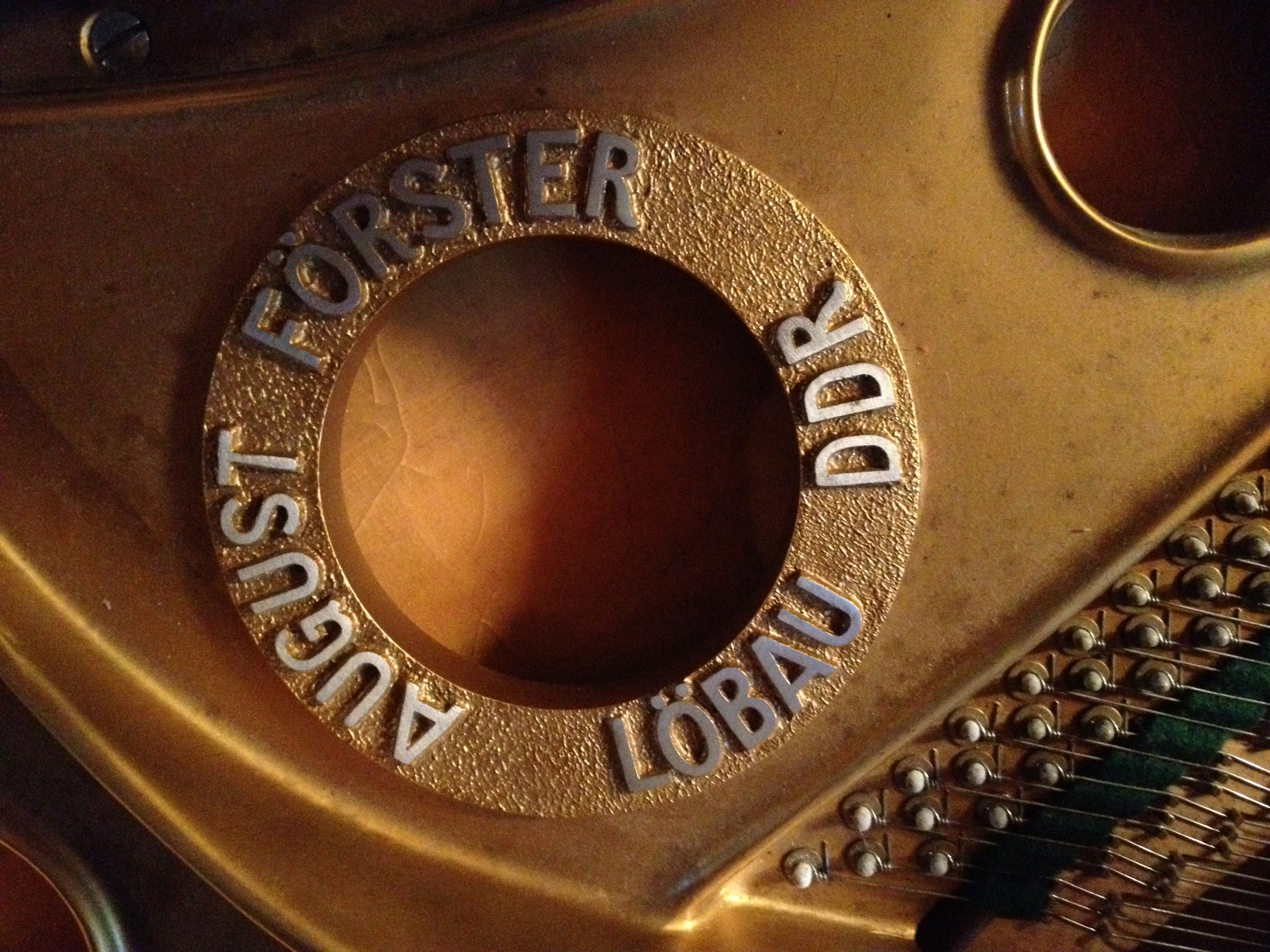
- Company type: Private
- Industry: Musical instruments
- Founded: 1859; 167 years ago
- Founder: August Förster
- Headquarters: Löbau, Germany
- Products: Pianos
- Website: august-foerster.de

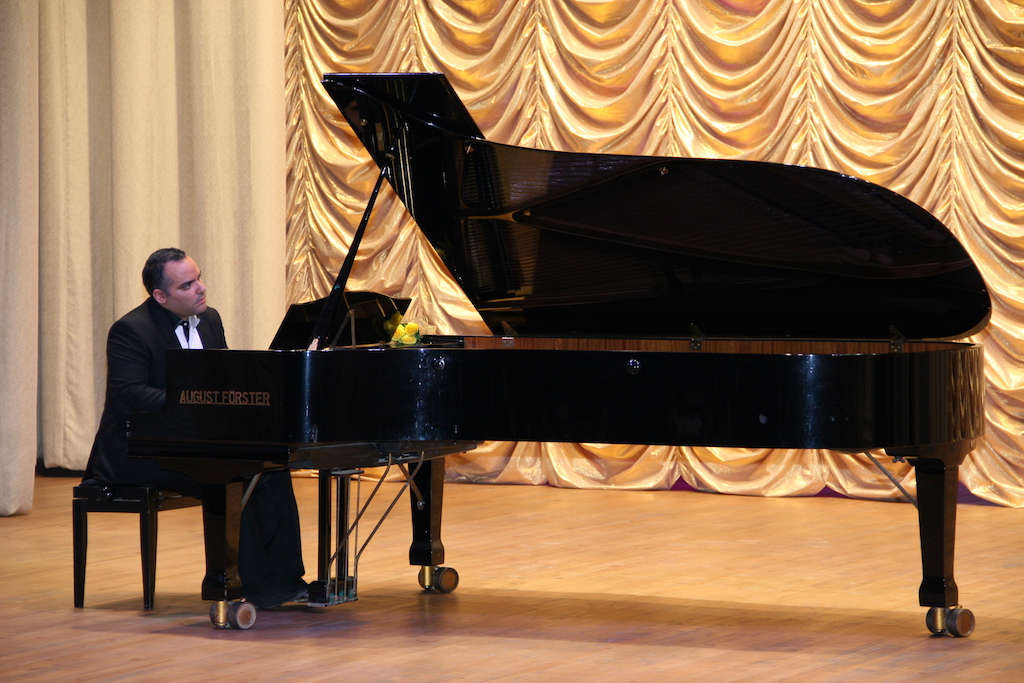
An artist performing on an August Förster piano in 2015

August Förster is a German piano manufacturing company (also rendered "Foerster," occasionally "Forster," officially "August Förster GmbH Kunsthandwerklicher Flügel-und-Pianobau") that currently has a staff of 40 employees and produces around 120 grand pianos and 150 uprights per year.

== History ==
On April 1, 1859, August Förster opened a small piano workshop in Löbau, Germany, expanding to a factory on Löbau's Jahn Street in 1862. Still in use today, this facility has been enlarged and modernized by the Förster family and remains the exclusive site for the manufacture of the original August Förster piano.

In 1897, Caesar Förster succeeded his father August as manager of the company and opened a second factory in Jiříkov, Bohemia (later Czechoslovakia and the Czech Republic) in 1900.

The owner Franz Cäsar Förster was awarded an imperial and royal warrant of appointment to the court of Austria-Hungary.

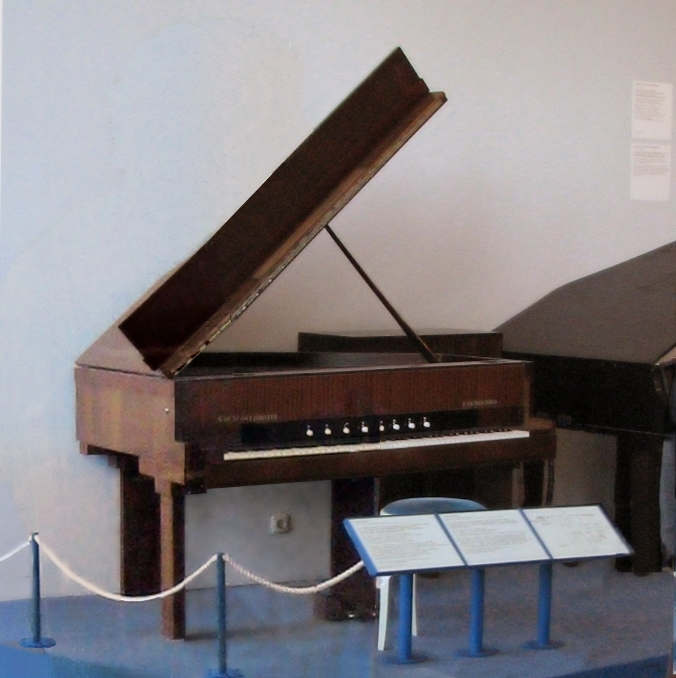
Vierling-Förster piano

In 1937 the company manufactured one of the first electric pianos, the “Vierling-Förster” piano, developed by Oskar Vierling at the Heinrich Institute for Oscillation Research at the Technische Hochschule in Charlottenburg (now Technische Universität Berlin) using electromagnetic pickups.

In 1948 the factory in Jiříkov was nationalized. Under new state-sanctioned management many pianos of good quality were produced, but since 1948 the Czechoslovak-made pianos have had no connection or relationship to the German August Förster piano. This "other" August Förster is currently produced in the Czech Republic by the Petrof Piano Company and sold in Canada and certain European countries.

In 1972, the final phase of East German nationalization transformed the company into the state-owned "VEB Flügel-und-Pianobau Löbau." Although still under the management of Wolfgang Förster, the company was annexed as part of the German Piano-Union, Leipzig. The family name was added back into the official company name in 1976, resulting in instruments branded "VEB Förster Pianos Löbau." Also in 1976, the company began its first exports to the United States.

== Noted Customers ==
Many prominent musicians have favored the German-made Förster piano. Among them have been Richard Strauss and Sergei Prokofiev, both owners of Förster pianos, and Giacomo Puccini, who wrote a number of his operas while working at a Förster piano. Robert Fischer, Alex Duke, Javier Pagola Zheng and Anton Kuerti are also noted for their regard of the August Förster piano.

== Awards ==
Förster pianos have won many awards for quality and tone, including the "Verleihung der Goldmedaille für den Rokokoflügel" in 1987.

In The Piano Book by Larry Fine, the German-made August Förster piano receives the highest possible rating in the areas of performance, quality control, and confidence (Fine's term for general durability). In his "High Quality Performance Pianos" category, Fine ranks the modern August Förster piano as just below such internationally respected instruments as C. Bechstein, Grotrian, and Bösendorfer. In addition, Fine praises the modern Förster piano for its "remarkable bass," and also comments on a particular "responsiveness" of the Renner action when observed in the Förster application.

== In popular culture ==
An August Förster piano was seen by audiences worldwide as the featured instrument in the movie The Pianist.

== Current Grand Piano Models ==
Model	Length	Weight
170	170 cm (5 ft 7 in)	350 kg
190	190 cm (6 ft 3 in)	375 kg
215	215 cm (7 ft 1 in)	470 kg
275	275 cm (9 ft 0 in)	550 kg

== Current Upright Piano Models ==
Model	Height	Weight
116 D	116 cm (46 in)	215 kg
116 E/C	116 cm (46 in)	225 kg
125 G	125 cm (49 in)	240 kg
125 F	125 cm (49 in)	240 kg
134 K	134 cm (53 in)	280 kg
