= Helpinstill =

Helpinstill is a US-based company that produces a unique electromagnetic pickup system for amplifying grand and upright pianos on stage. During the late 1970s the company also marketed a range of portable pianos ready-fitted with the pickups. These instruments were built by Kimball to Helpinstill's specifications. The company's founder and namesake, Charles Helpinstill, performs in Houston with his band, Ezra Charles and The Texas Blues Band.

== Description ==
The Helpinstill pickup comprises three (or four in the case of some uprights) long electromagnetic bar pickups which can be temporarily attached to a piano's iron frame with magnets and clamps. The pickups only sense vibrations from the strings, virtually eliminating the possibility of feedback. A small mixer allows the pianist or sound engineer to adjust the output balance of the pickups.

== The Melodipro piano ==
In the mid-1970s, the Aeolian piano company marketed the Melodipro upright piano, a semi-roadworthy version of its Melodigrand 64-note piano fitted with a Helpinstill pickup system. The shortcomings of this instrument inspired Helpinstill to produce its own completely portable instruments.

== Helpinstill pianos ==
Three models were produced between 1977 and about 1980. All were true acoustic pianos with soundboards.

=== Roadmaster 88 and 64 models ===
These were uprights, built into aluminium flightcases on casters with fold-away keyboards and sustain pedals. The 88 offered a full piano range while the 64 lacked the top and bottom octaves.

=== Portable Grand ===
This was an 88-note baby grand without its heavy outer case, and designed to separate into a keyboard and a "harp" section with removable "hairpin"-style legs. A fibreglass cover was fitted to the "harp" in lieu of a traditional case and lid. This made the instrument considerably lighter than a traditional grand of the same size.

Both instruments are still renowned for their authentic sound when amplified, and the Helpinstill pickup remains an industry standard.
