= Dietrichstein Castle (Lützelsdorf) =

Burgstall Dietrichstein
- Diederichstein
- Pretzfeld-Lützelsdorf-„Diederichstein“

Site information
- Type: Hill castle, valley edge
- Code: DE-BY
- Condition: Collapsed, a few surviving wall remains

Location
- Coordinates: 49°45′24″N 11°12′10″E
- Height: 454 m above sea level (NN)

Site history
- Built: 1000 to 1100

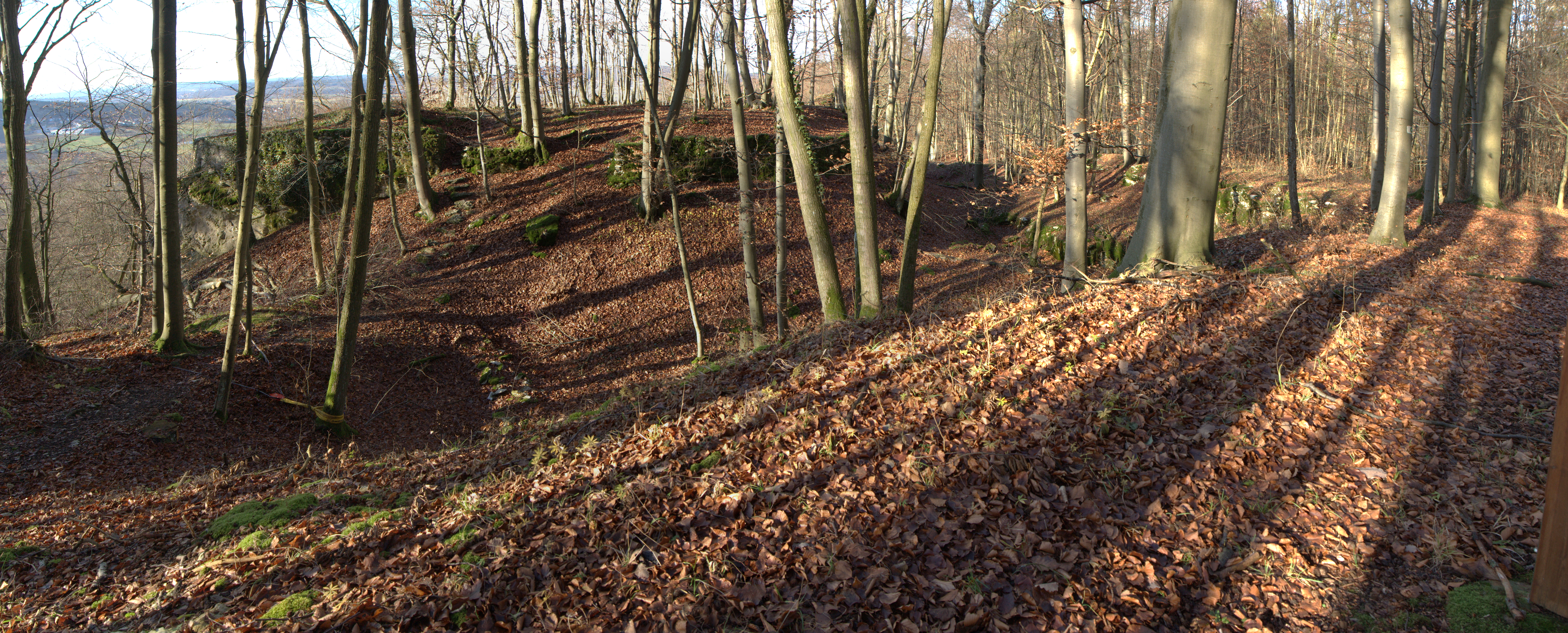
Dietrichstein Castle Site

The burgstall of Dietrichstein Castle, also called the Diederichstein Ruins (Ruine Diederichstein), is the site of an old, probably high mediaeval, aristocratic, castle, situated high above the valley of the River Trubach in the municipality of Pretzfeld in the Upper Franconian county of Forchheim in Bavaria, Germany.

The burgstall is freely accessible at all times and is used today as a viewing point.

== Location ==
The small, former hill castle is located within the Franconian Switzerland-Veldenstein Forest Nature Park about 750 metres north-northeast of the village of Lützelsdorf. It stands at a height of about 450 m above sea level (NN) on the Diederichstein rocks whose sides drop vertically into the valley of the Trubach about eleven kilometres northeast of Forchheim.

Close by, on the Kreuzberg, lies another burgstall or former castle site, the Schlüsselstein, probably founded by the Schlüsselbergs. Immediately west of Ebermannstadt is yet another, unnamed, burgstall, designed as a high motte. To the east lay the former castle of Wolkenstein, today a ruin with just a few surviving remains, and the fallen tower castle of Eberhardstein on a rock pinnacle. There is another castle site, Stadtmers Bürg, on the Hetzelfels rocks. A bit further away is the old castle site of Wichsenstein above the eponymous village of Wichsenstein, today an observation point with far-reaching views.

== History ==
When exactly Dietrichstein Castle was built is not known; the only written record of it dates to the year 1355. At that time the castle probably no longer existed.

One clue to the age of the little castle could be its name: Nuremberg Castle researcher, Hellmut Kunstmann, has established that castles in East Francia that combine a personal name with the word Stein ("rock") are usually very old. Examples include Pottenstein, which was founded around 1070, Gößweinstein, first mentioned in 1076 and Hiltpoltstein Castle which was built before 1100. Other examples are Egloffstein, Leupoldstein, Eberhardstein, Wichsenstein and Gernotenstein.

The shape of the castle foundations also suggest it is old. Its almost circular site is separated on the northeastern side by a semi-circular moat from the somewhat lower-lying plateau. On the other sides, the castle was guarded by the steep rock faces. The castle could not have withstood an enemy armed with cannons attacking on a broad front from the plateau because they would have had a wide avenue of approach. Thus it was probably built in the second half of the 11th century before the invention of gunpowder. This is underlined by the discovery of pieces of pottery that date to the period between the 11th and early 13th centuries.

The builder of the castle is also unknown. According to Kunstmann, he could have come from the family of the lords of Wiesenthau; the first member of this noble family is Bero of Wiesenthau who was named in 1128. The name Dietrich first surfaces in connection with this family in the year 1156.

However, the lords of Dietrichstein from Carinthia could also have been responsible. They are mentioned several times as a Bamberg ministeriales family who were witnesses in deeds and as citizens in legal cases that related to Upper Franconia. They could have built a castle here and named themselves after their family castle of Dietrichstein Castle in Carinthia. However, there is no written evidence to confirm either theory.

The only written record of the castle was made on 22 February 1355, when Henry Wolf and his wife, Alheid sold to the Bamberg cathedral chapter the manor of Lützelsdorf, which they had inherited from their cousin Conrad Wolf, "with all rights and those estates on the Dytrichstein which Conrad Wolf owned himself" for 320 pounds of heller. The Wolfs were presumably a side branch of the lords of Wiesenthau; in 1375 they were also in possession of the nearby schloss in Pretzfeld. According to the deed, the castle was an allod of the Wolf family.

In 1977, several wall remains of the burgstall were uncovered and conserved or, in places, restored.

The monument is listed by the Bavarian State Office for Monument Protection as a "medieval burgstall" with index number D-4-6233-0307.

== Description ==
The now levelled castle once stood on the edge of the plateau where it drops vertically into the valley of the Trubach. A small rocky spur, which projects south from the rock face, was divided by a semi-circular moat. This striking ditch, which may have been formed as the result of a rockslide, was further extended during the construction of the castle. Today it has a width of 12 to 14 metres and still has a depth of about five metres. At the ends of the moat, which run up to the rockface of the plateau, there are almost no signs of any rubble heaps, an indication of the natural formation of the ditch. At the northern end of the ditch the plateau descends a little, so that the floor of the ditch and the terrain in front of it were at the same level. Here a wall was built to hinder an enemy wanting to enter the moat. A 17-metre-long section of this rampart still remains, running along the outer edge of the moat before turning inwards to form a barrier at the side. The rampart here is still about 0.5 metres high and three metres wide.

The moat lies along the northeastern side of the almost circular castle site. The other sides were protected from attack by vertical rock faces.

The old access to the castle was probably on the eastern side of the castle plateau near the present ascent, which runs up several steps from the ditch. The circular plateau of the castle has a diameter of about 35 metres and its surface is level. On the north, east and part of the south sides, the restored enceinte may still be seen. Two low mounds in the northwestern part of the castle are probably the remains of buildings. A section of restored wall has survived.

In the southeastern part of the castle, near the former entrance, is a 1.5-metre-wide wall. According to Kunstmann this is the remnant of a thick-walled tower, perhaps the old bergfried of the castle. Because, in restoring the wall remains, the wall space was not filled, it looks like a double wall today. To the west are the wall remains, up to two metres high, of another building that exactly follows the edge of the rock.

In the south, there is a rocky crevice, 1 to 1.5 metres wide, which is now covered by four stone slabs. It was presumably used by the castle residents as a store for important provisions; a feature of many castles.

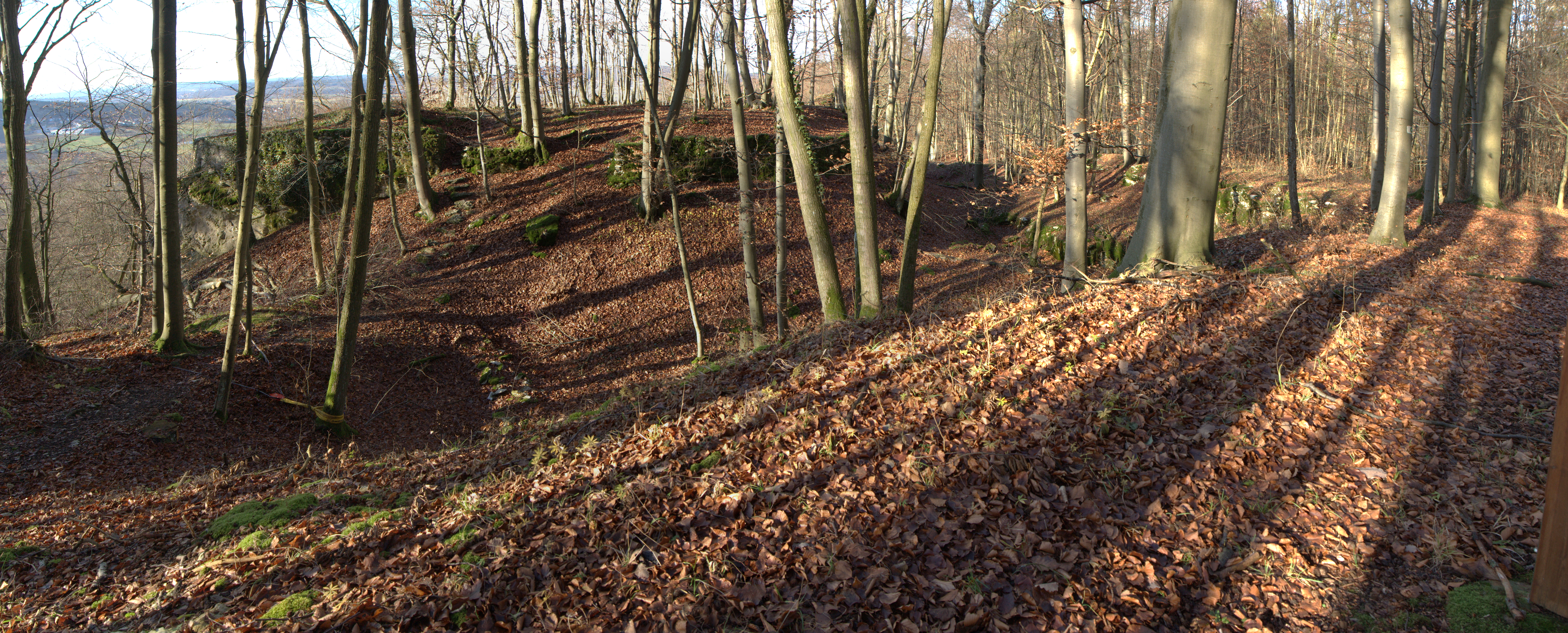
View of the burgstall from the northeast (Jan 2012)

== Literature ==
- Walter Heinz: Ehemalige Adelssitze im Trubachtal. Verlag Palm und Enke, Erlangen und Jena, 1996, ISBN 3-7896-0554-9, pp. 261–269.
- Hellmut Kunstmann: Die Burgen der südwestlichen Fränkischen Schweiz. Kommissionsverlag Degener & Co., Neustadt an der Aisch, 1990, ISBN 3-86652-928-7, pp. 262–264.
- Toni Eckert, Susanne Fischer, Renate Freitag, Rainer Hofmann, Walter Tausendpfund: Die Burgen der Fränkischen Schweiz: Ein Kulturführer. Gürtler Druck, Forchheim o.J., ISBN 3-9803276-5-5, pp. 40–41.
