= Wichsenstein Castle =

- Gößweinstein-Wichsenstein
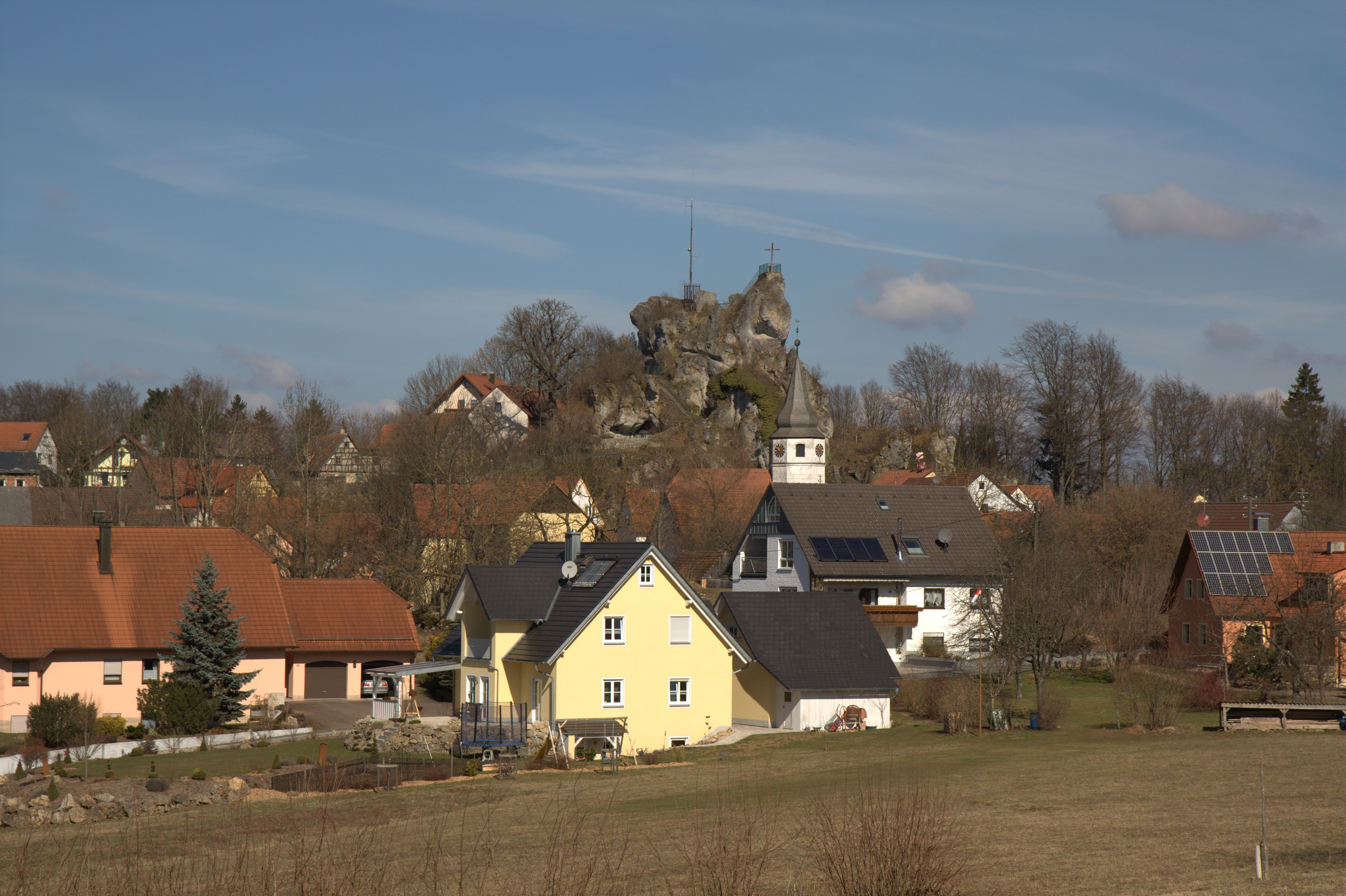
- Site of Wichsenstein Castle – view of the castle rock above the village (March 2011)

Site information
- Type: hill castle, summit location
- Code: DE-BY
- Condition: burgstall (no above-ground ruins)

Location
- Location within Germany
- Coordinates: 49°44′17″N 11°16′03″E
- Height: 587 m above sea level (NN)

Site history
- Built: probably around 1100

Garrison information
- Occupants: Bamberg ministeriales

Wichsenstein Castle (German: Burgstall Wichsenstein) was a hill castle, once owned by noblemen, on a steep and prominent rock reef (Felsriff) outcrop above the church village of Wichsenstein in the Upper Franconian county of Forchheim in Bavaria, Germany. The castle has been completely demolished and there are no visible remains. The castle rock is now just used as a viewing point.

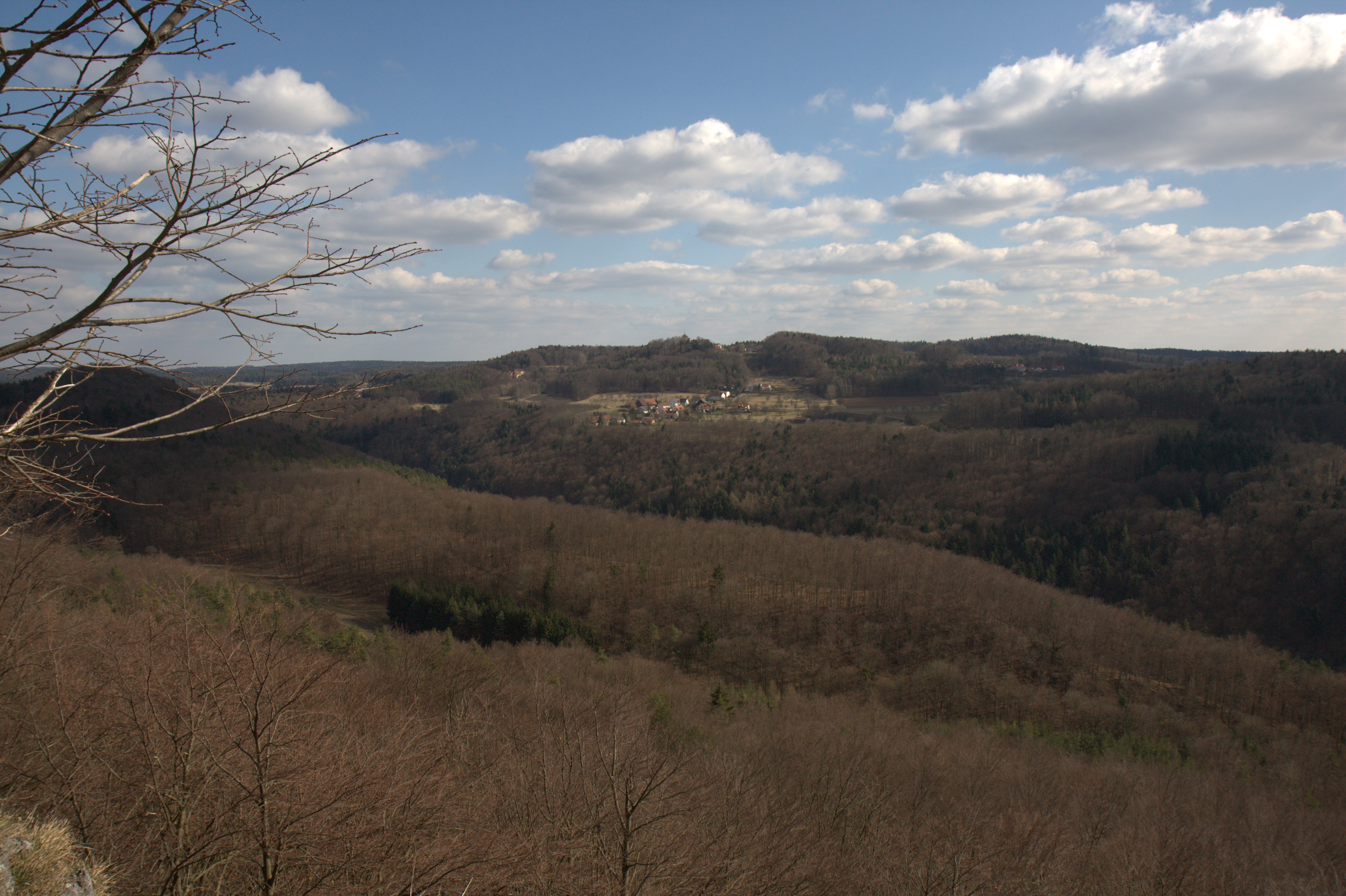
View of Wichsenstein from the west

== Location ==
The site or burgstall of this hilltop castle lies in the central part of Franconian Switzerland, part of the German Central Upland range of the Franconian Jura. It is located on top of a natural monument and rocky kuppe, the Wichsenstein Rock (Wichsensteiner Fels), at a height of about 587 m above sea level (NN) on the northern edge of the village of Wichsenstein, about 20 metres above the village and about 60 metres north-northwest of the Roman Catholic parish church of Saint Erhard. and about 15 kilometres northeast of Forchheim.

In the vicinity are other old mediaeval castles. In the nearby village of Bieberbach are the remains of Bieberbach Castle, to the southwest is the prehistorical and early ancient hillfort on the Heidelberg above Äpfelbach. South of that lies the site of the Altes Schloss on the Altschlossberg hill near Affalterthal and an eponymous castle site near Oberzaunsbach on the Zaunsbacher Berg. To the west is the site of Sattelmannsburg on the Hetzelfels and Thüngfelderstein Castle and Wolkenstein Castle.

== History ==
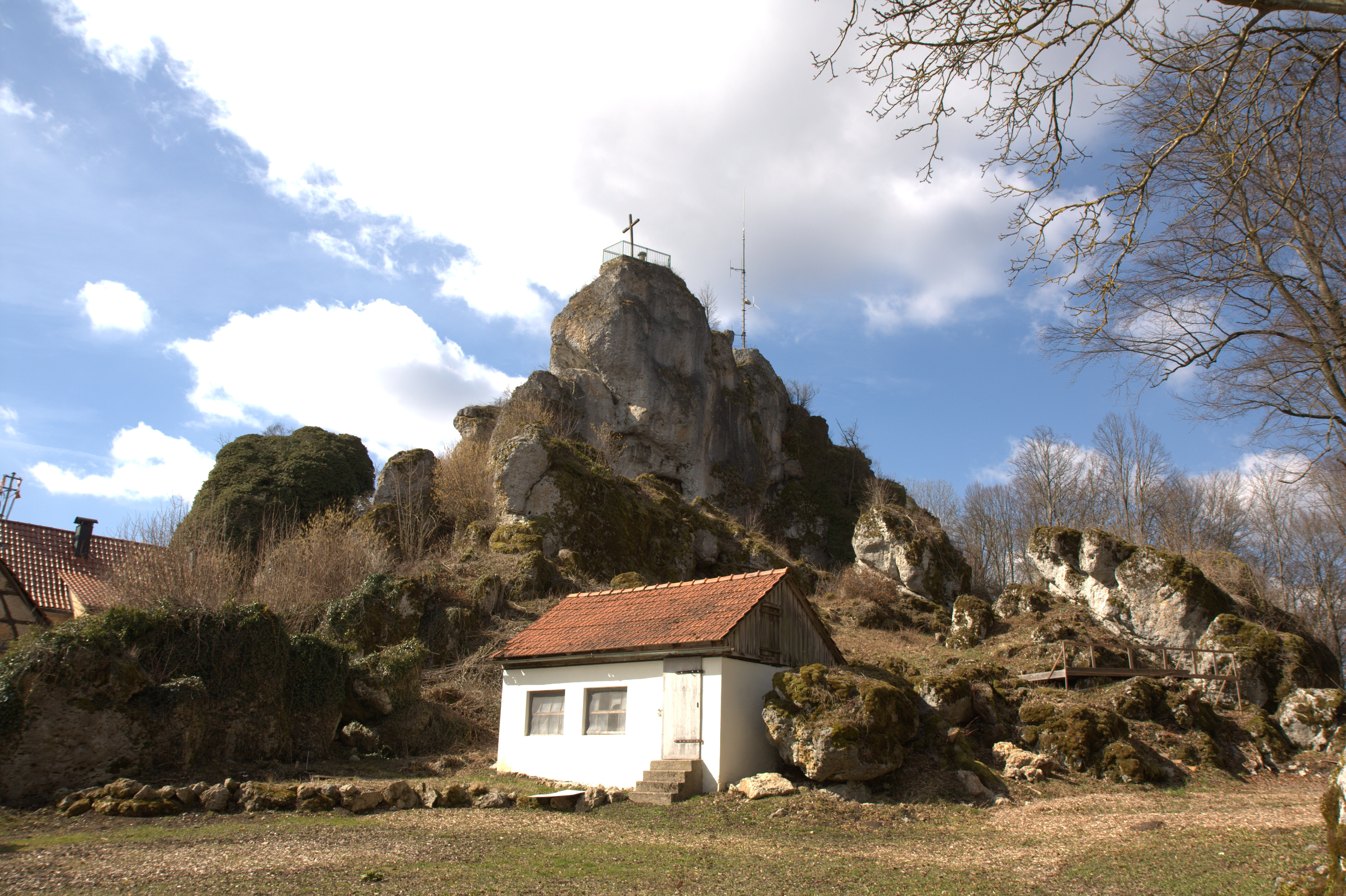
View of the castle rock from the east (March 2011)

The name of Wichsenstein Castle derives from the personal name "Wikker" and the suffix Stein or "Rock"; it was thus the castle of the Wikker family. Nuremberg Castle scholar, Hellmut Kunstmann, has ascertained that castles with the combination of a personal name and the word Stein in the Franconian region are very old. Examples are Gößweinstein Castle, which is first recorded in 1076, Hiltpoltstein Castle (1109), Gernotenstein Castle near Michelfeld, which is recorded in the foundation document of Michelfeld Abbey in 1119, and Pottenstein Castle, which was probably founded between 1057 and 1070.

The purpose of Wichsenstein Castle could have been to guard an ancient road that ran from Pretzfeld and Wannbach via Wichsenstein to Biberach, Waidach and Stein bei Pegnitz, continuing into Upper Palatinate and Bohemia.

When and by whom the castle was founded is not exactly known, but in 1118 a "Wikker" was mentioned in the records. It is possible that the father of Eberhard von Wikkeristein (recorded 1122) had built the castle shortly beforehand. The Wichsensteins were ministeriales of the Bishopric of Bamberg, whose coat of arms bore a blue wolf salient on a silver field. Eberhard was named in 1121 and later as Eberhard de Lapide, which means von Stein or "of the rock". In 1133 the brothers, Eberhard and Wikker de Lapide, were named as joint witnesses in a manuscript from Ensdorf Abbey. Kunstmann was able to ascertain the reason for the change of name was that the home castle of the Wichsensteins, the little castle of Stein, today just a castle site in the village of Stein south of Pegnitz, had to be given up for unknown reasons and they had to build a new castle of their own. In 1165 as well an Eberhard II de Steine was appointed as an episcopal ministerialis, in 1201 Wikker II de Steine was a witness in a deed by Prince Bishop Timo. In 1240 Eberhard III was likewise named as a witness in a document by Frederick III Walpot for Banz Abbey.

The first record of Wichsenstein Castle was not, however, until 30 October 1310, when Conrad I of Wichsenstein received 60 pounds of Haller (coins) from the Bishop of Bamberg, Wulfing of Stubenberg and in return had to "guard" the castle for ten years, i.e. fight on the side of the bishop in case of war with his part of the castle and his contingent of troops. In 1328 Bishop Henry II gave Boppo of Wichsenstein a further hundred pounds of Haller for the part of the castle enfeoffed to him. For that he had to concede right of the bishop to buy it back; after that the castle was always a freehold of the Wichsensteins.

The Wichsensteins ran into financial difficulties, probably as a result of the economic boom of the towns during the 13th and 14th centuries and the great agricultural crisis of the second half of the 14th century, and became robber barons. George of Wichsenstein was at that time in the service of the brothers Henry and Eberhard of Berg, who had also become robber barons, and was taken prisoner in 1397 by King Wenceslaus following the siege of Spies Castle near Betzenstein. After he had betrayed several robber barons by name, he was executed in Nuremberg. In 1421 Hans II, Kunz IV, Fritz II and Hermann III of Wichsenstein engaged in a feud with the Bishopric of Bamberg and the Imperial City of Nuremberg. That same year John of Wichsenstein and Michael of Streitberg raided and sacked a Leipzig merchants convoy and captured several people, whereupon the castle of Wichsenstein was destroyed because of its role in the robberies by Bishop Albert of Wertheim who decreed that it could not be rebuilt without his permission. In 1432 the ruins were recorded as an episcopal fief that, if rebuilt, had to become an open house of the bishopric. In 1436 it reappeared as Schloss Wichsenstein. It was thus rebuilt within four years, but the extent of the destruction is unknown.

In the years that followed, parts of the castle became a fief of the ministerialis, Jörg of Rabenstein, in 1476 other parts of the castle belonged to the Wichsenstein line of Bieberbach and another line, whose estate was however still a freehold. In 1484, another line of Wichsensteins was enfeoffed with the Lower Franconian castle at Hainstatt by the Bishop of Würzburg. After 1507, all enfeoffment of the castle ceased. A mid-16th-century map shows the castle as a ruin; it was probably finally destroyed in 1525 during the Peasants' War.

In 1609, large parts of the ruins still survived as a document about the riding estate (Rittergut) of Wichsenstein testifies. After the family line was extinguished on the death of George of Wichsenstein zu Kirchschönbach (near Prichsenstadt) in November 1606 the Rittergut was sold on 24 November 1621 by its heirs to the Bishopric of Bamberg. In the deed of sale it was shown, however, as owned by free nobility, which was not the case for an episcopal fiefdom. Also, the castle was not mentioned.

In 1828 the canon (Domkapitular), Franz Karl Freiherr von Münster, made the summit of the rock on which the castle stood, accessible. In 1876 large remnants of the ruins remained visible. In 1879 the state construction office in Bayreuth said that "apart from rocks there were still wall remains in the surrounding lower levels and in the private forest".

Today there are no traces of the castle left. Its site, which is open to the public, is a viewing rock and may be ascended from Wichsenstein on 207 steps.

The protected monument, which is described by the Bavarian State Office for Monument Protection as a "mediaeval castle site", bears the monument number D-4-6233-0095.

== Literature ==
- Walter Heinz: Ehemalige Adelssitze im Trubachtal – Ein Wegweiser für Heimatfreunde und Wanderer. Palm und Enke Verlag, Erlangen und Jena, 1996, ISBN 3-7896-0554-9, pp. 244–257.
- Gustav Voit, Walter Rüfer: Eine Burgenreise durch die Fränkische Schweiz, 2nd edition, Palm und Enke Verlag, Erlangen, 1991, ISBN 3-7896-0064-4, pp. 217–220.
- Hellmut Kunstmann: Die Burgen der südwestlichen Fränkischen Schweiz. 2nd edition, Kommissionsverlag Degener & Co., Neustadt an der Aisch, 1990, pp. 244–248.
