= Schlüsselstein Castle =

Ruined castle in Bavaria, Germany

- Burgstall am Kreuzberg
- Ebermannstadt
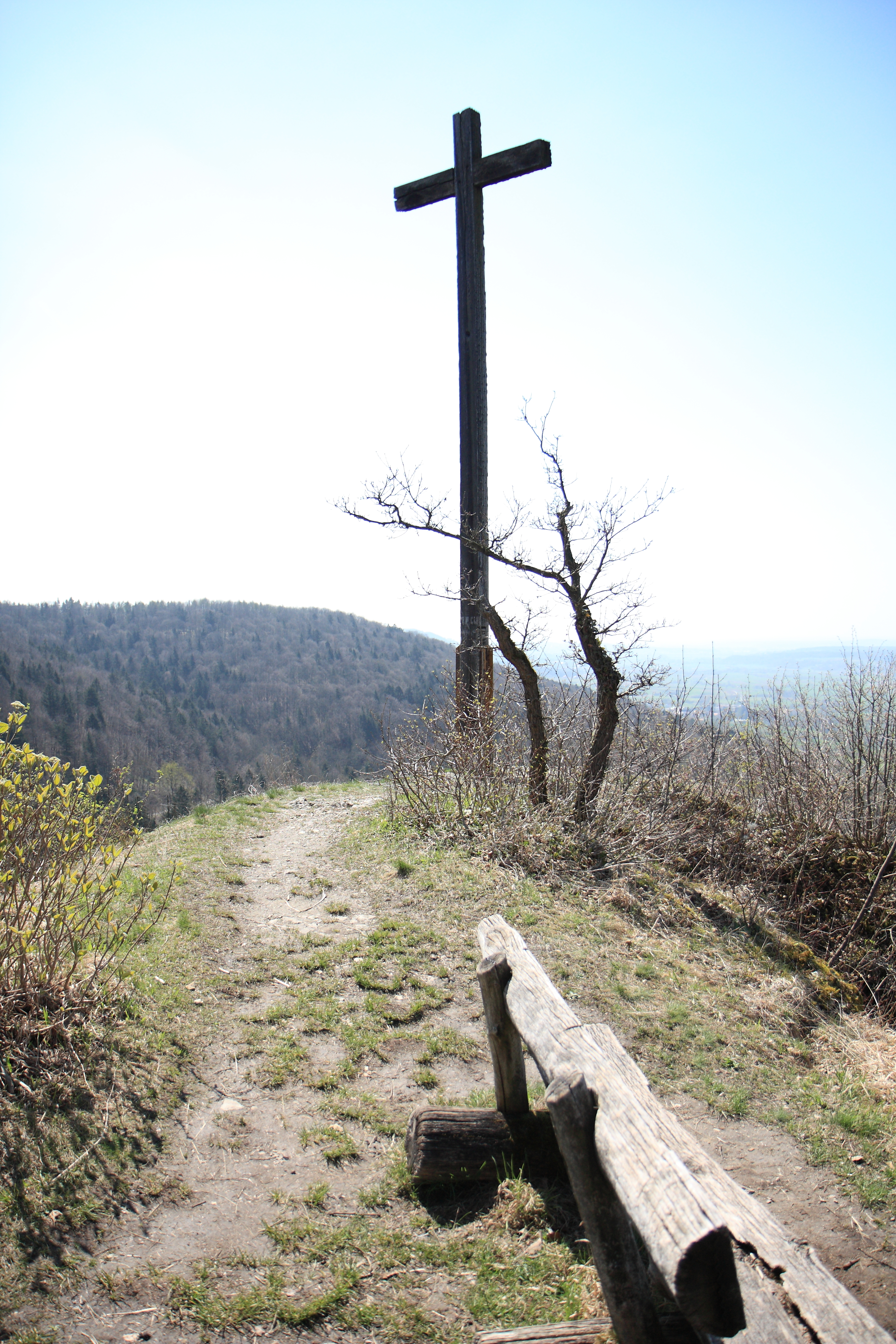
- The site of the main castle

Site information
- Type: hill castle, spur castle
- Code: DE-BY
- Condition: burgstall (no above-ground ruins)

Location
- Coordinates: 49°46′25″N 11°11′55″E
- Height: 489.6 m above sea level (NN)

Site history
- Built: probably during the second half of the 12th century

Garrison information
- Occupants: Unknown

Schlüsselstein Castle was a castle and the seat of a noble family, probably dating to the High Middle Ages, the remains of which lie above the town of Ebermannstadt in the Upper Franconian county of Forchheim in the south German state of Bavaria. The site is known locally as Burgstall Schlüsselstein.

The burgstall is freely accessible and is used as a viewing point.

== Location ==
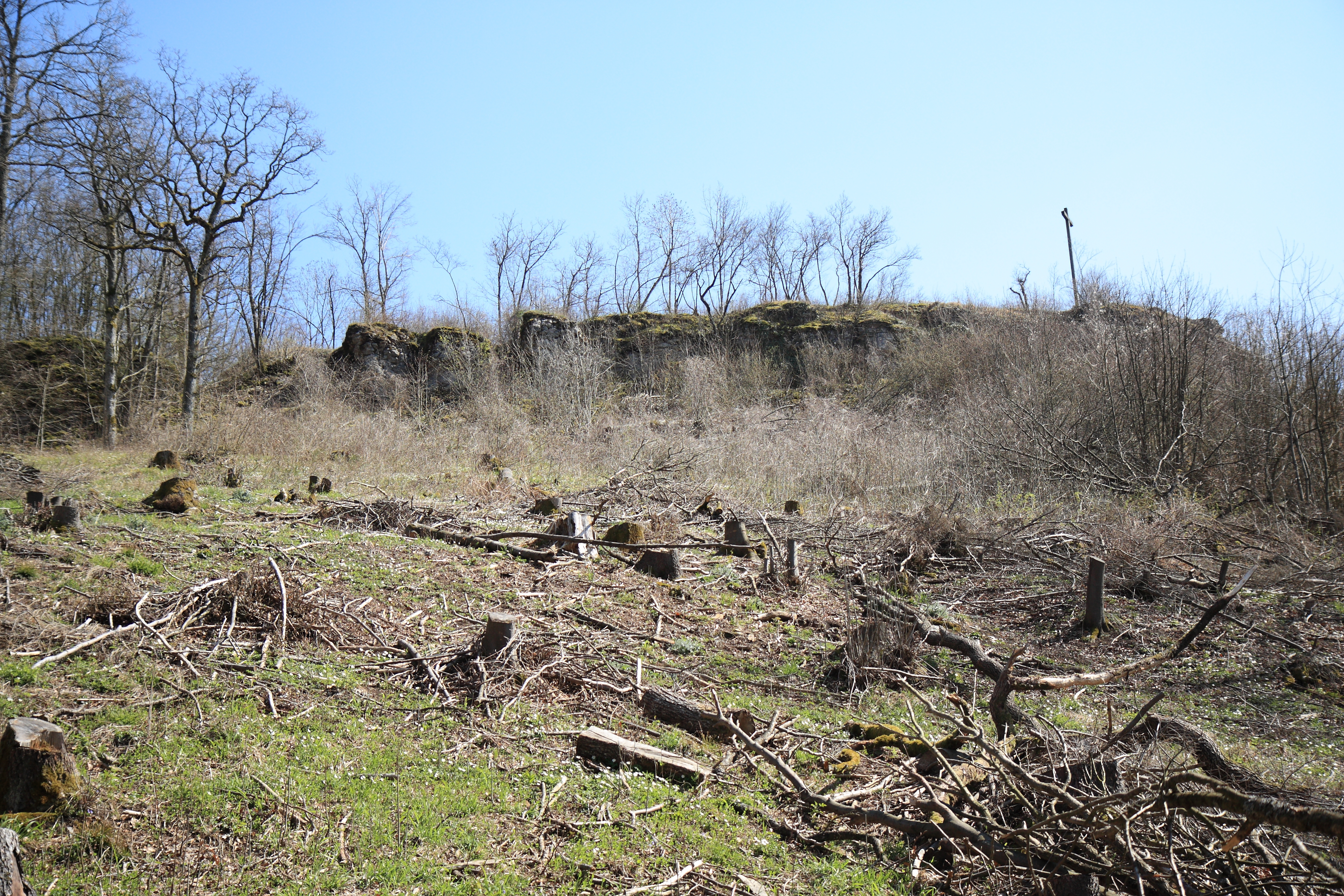
North side of the burgstall

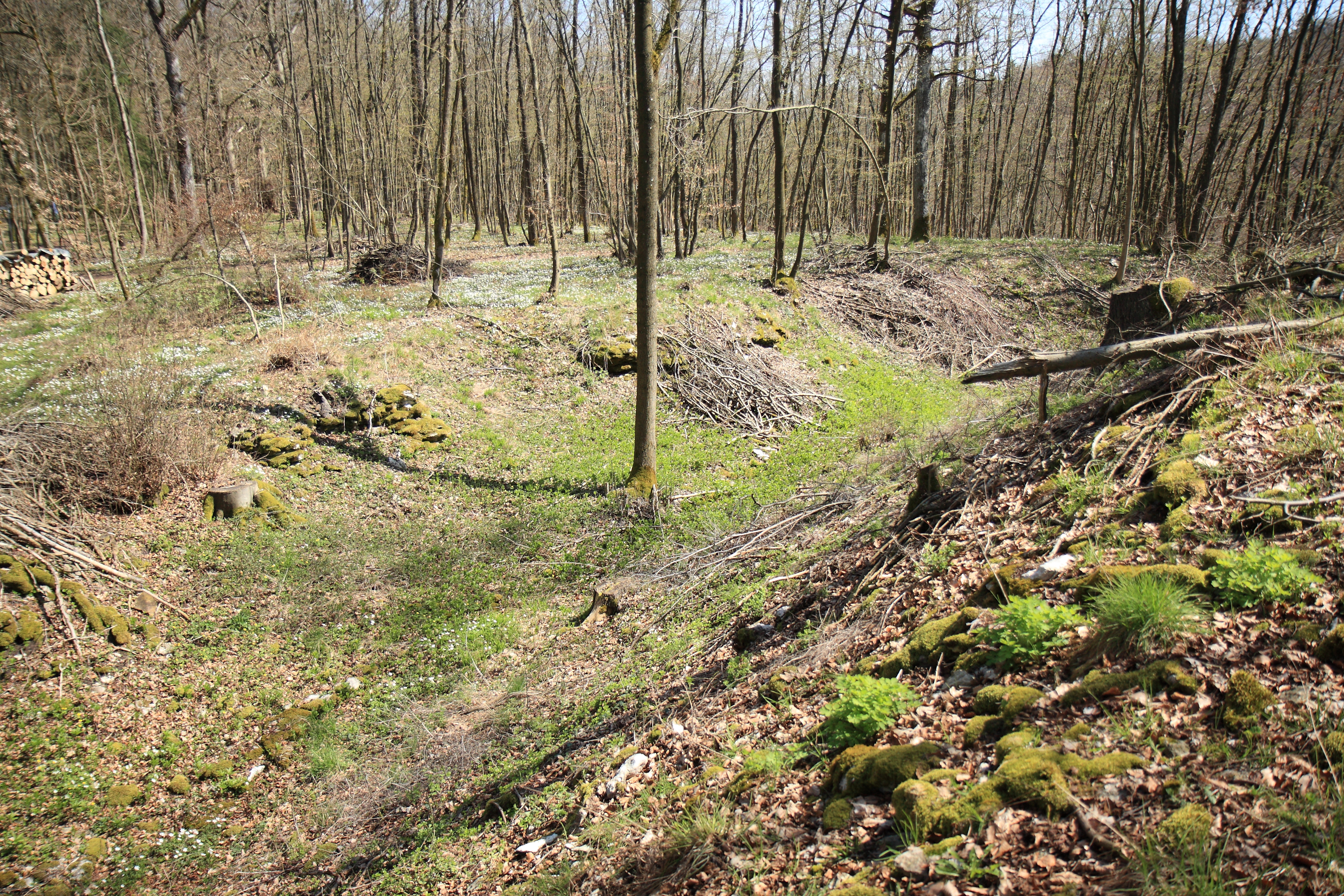
View of the outer section of ditch guarding the outer ward

The spur castle is located in the western part of the Franconian Switzerland-Veldenstein Forest Nature Park on a rocky, southwest-facing hill spur of the Kreuzberg, jutting out into the Wiesent valley at a height of 489.6 m above sea level (NN). It is about 1300 metres southeast of the parish church of Saint Nicholas in Ebermannstadt and about 12 kilometres northeast of the town of Forchheim.

Near the site of Schlüsselstein Castle are several other castles: Dietrichstein to the south, the former Wolkenstein Castle to the southeast, a possible castle site to the north near the hamlet of Rothenbühl, a burgstall near the cemetery in Niederfellendorf, an element of a fortification from the early medieval period on the Hummerstein over Gasseldorf and motte castles in the area of the sports field in Ebermannstadt and in Rüssenbach.

Within line of sight of the levelled castle of Schlüsselstein lay Reifenberg Castle, on the site of which is the Vexier Chapel, the unresearched burgstall above Ebermannstadt on the opposite side of the valley; Feuerstein Castle and Schloss Greifenstein.

== History ==
No documentary evidence exists about the former castle on the Schlüsselstein; archaeological investigations have yet to be undertaken.

The hill now called the Kreuzberg was named after the cross on the summit of the spur, but was originally called the Schlüsselstein. In 1487, Bishop Henry III Groß of Trockau donated the Ebermannstadt forests around the Slusselstein which belonged to the Bishopric (the Ebermannstädtern Stiftshölzer). The castle is still called the Schlüsselstein in the land records or cadastre.

Because of its name, Schlüsselstein, it may be assumed that the castle was founded by the noble family of Schlüsselberg, who named several of their foundations using the prefix Schlüssel, for example Schlüsselau Abbey, the town of Schlüsselfeld and the castle of Schlüsselburg at Markgröningen in Baden-Württemberg. However, the castle of Schlüsselstein was not mentioned in any Schlüsselberg family deeds or in the 1349 treaty of Iphofen, with which its possessions were divided among their victors after their violent extinction in 1347. The castle had probably been abandoned earlier, perhaps in favour of Neideck Castle.

A further clue to a link with the lords of Schlüsselberg is the great similarity of the castle of Schlüsselstein with their main family seat of Schlüsselberg.

According to its design, that is to say its division into a main ward and outer ward, it was probably built during the second half of the 12th century.

The castle site is densely wooded up to the summit of the hill spur and, in places, heavily overgrown with bushes. It is accessible via a hiking trail and is used as a rest stop and viewing point above Ebermannstadt and the lower Wiesent valley. The remains of the walls of the old castle have only survived in the area of the outer neck ditch where they have been made as dry stone walls. An information board has been erected in the area of the inner ward.

The historic monument is registered as a "medieval burgstall and probably prehistoric hill settlement", and bears monument number D-4-6233-0026.

== Description ==
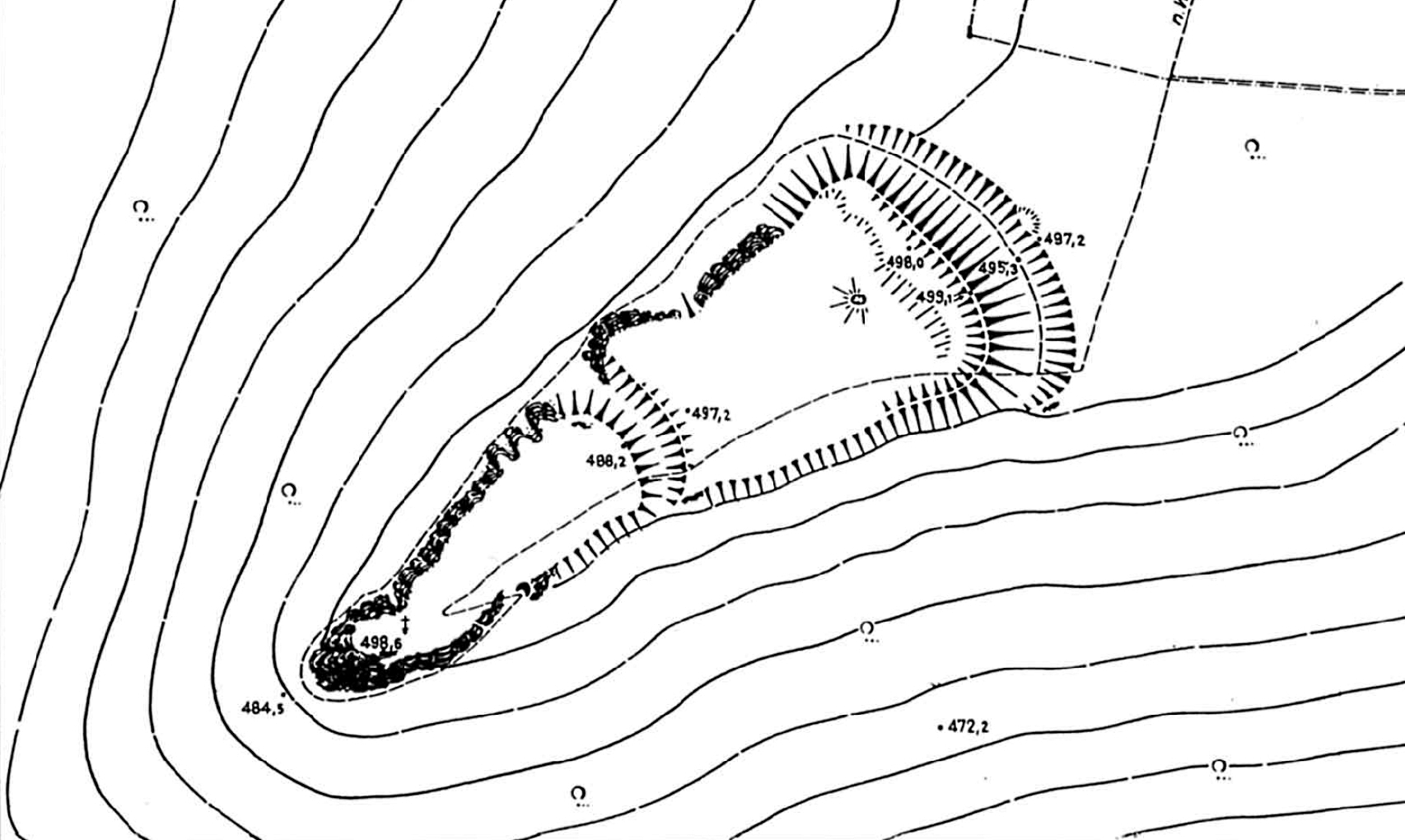
Plan of the castle

The former castle lay about 200 metres above the valley of the Wiesent on a 150-metre-long, southwest-oriented hill spur, which protrudes from plateau to the east. On its south side the spur falls steeply into a small side valley, the north side is protected by a steep descent into the Wiesent valley. The tip of the spur drops vertically for a few metres to the top of a steep slope.

The east side, on the other hand, transitions almost on the level into the plateau, requiring a ditch to be built there. This section of dry moat was about 35 metres long and 13.5 metres wide. Its outer edge facing the plateau is 1.9 to 2.3 metres above the bottom of the ditch, its inner is considerably higher, about 2.7 to 3.8 metres above the bottom. The ditch, for which no spoil heap can be identified, runs in a shallow arc around the outer ward and ends on both sides at the edge of the plateau, the ends being slightly refaced. In the northern part of the moat a 1.5-metre-long section of dry stone wall has survived.

The area of the inner ward is approximately rectangular and is 48 metres long. The side along the moat is 35 metres long, but the opposite side is only about 28 metres long. On its northern side, it drops vertically for a few metres down a face that is rocky in places. A section of the old outer wall is still visible at the ditch, rising to a height of 0.6 metres. Access to the castle was probably where the trail to the summit of the spur is today; it crosses the outer section of ditch just before its southern end. There are no traces of former buildings on the flat terrain of the outer ward. A low wall is also recognisable by the inner ditch.

The inner ward is separated from the outer by a curved transverse moat the ends of which are refused. It has a length of about 25 metres and a width of 7 metres and is still 1.7 metres deep.

The plan of the main castle was in the shape of an elongated triangle with a length of about 50 metres. It was 20 metres wide at the base, but only 7 metres wide at the tip. Along the whole of the north side, the hillside drops vertically for a few metres; the southern side has a vertical rocky drop only near the tip of the spur.

The site of the main castle is relatively flat, climbing gently to the highest point. There are no signs of any buildings.

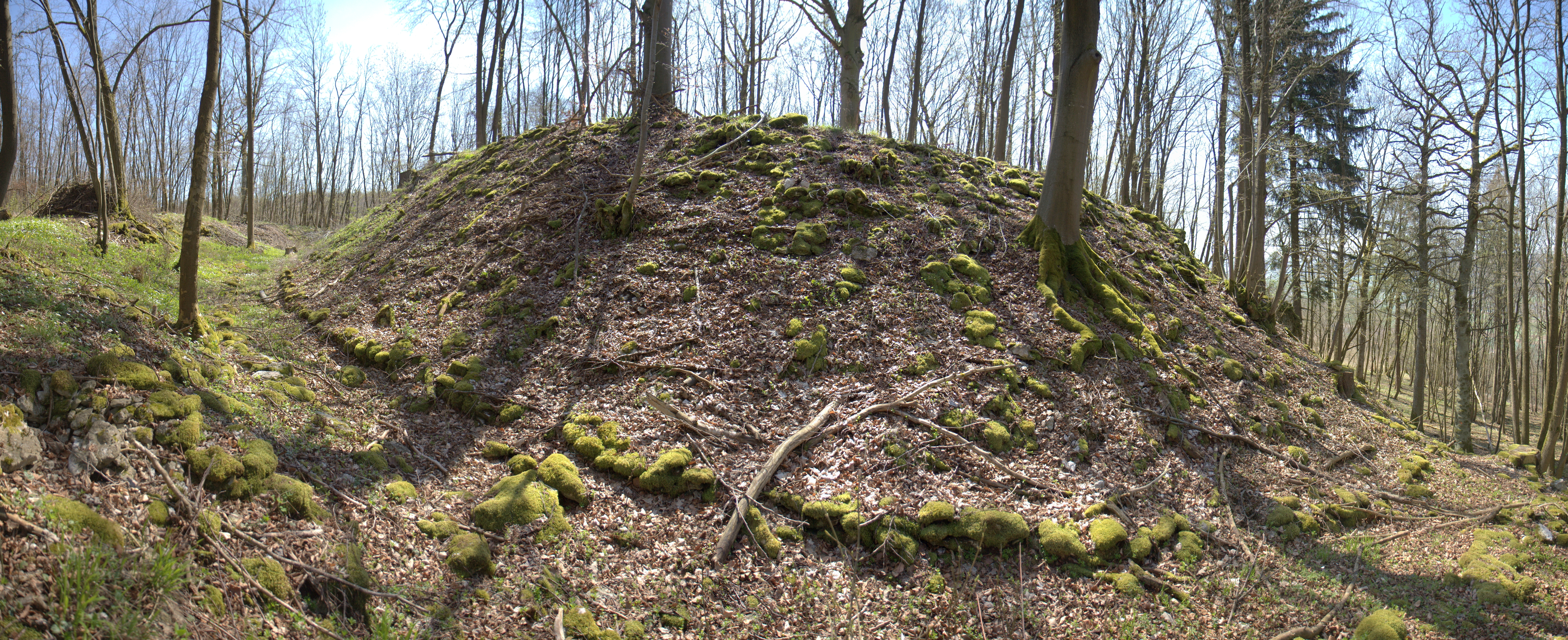
View of the castle mound from the northeast. In the foreground is the neck ditch, which separates the spur from the rocky ridge.

== Literature ==
- Hans Losert, Björn-Uwe Abels et al.: Führer zu archäologischen Denkmälern in Deutschland, Band 20: Fränkische Schweiz. Konrad Theiss Verlag, Stuttgart, 1990, ISBN 3-8062-0586-8, pp. 144–145.
- Hellmut Kunstmann: Die Burgen der südwestlichen Fränkischen Schweiz. 2. Auflage, Kommissionsverlag Degener & Co., Neustadt an der Aisch, 1990, pp. 98–99.
- Klaus Schwarz: Die vor- und frühgeschichtlichen Geländedenkmäler Oberfrankens. (Materialhefte zur bayerischen Vorgeschichte, Series B, Volume 5). Verlag Michael Lassleben, Kallmünz, 1955, p. 74.
- Hellmut Kunstmann: Burgen in Oberfranken, Besitzverhältnisse, Baugeschichte und Schicksale. 1. Teil: Die Burgen der edelfreien Geschlechter im Wiesentgebiet. Verlag E. C. Baumann, Kulmbach, 1953, pp. 40–44.
