= Thosbach =

River in Germany

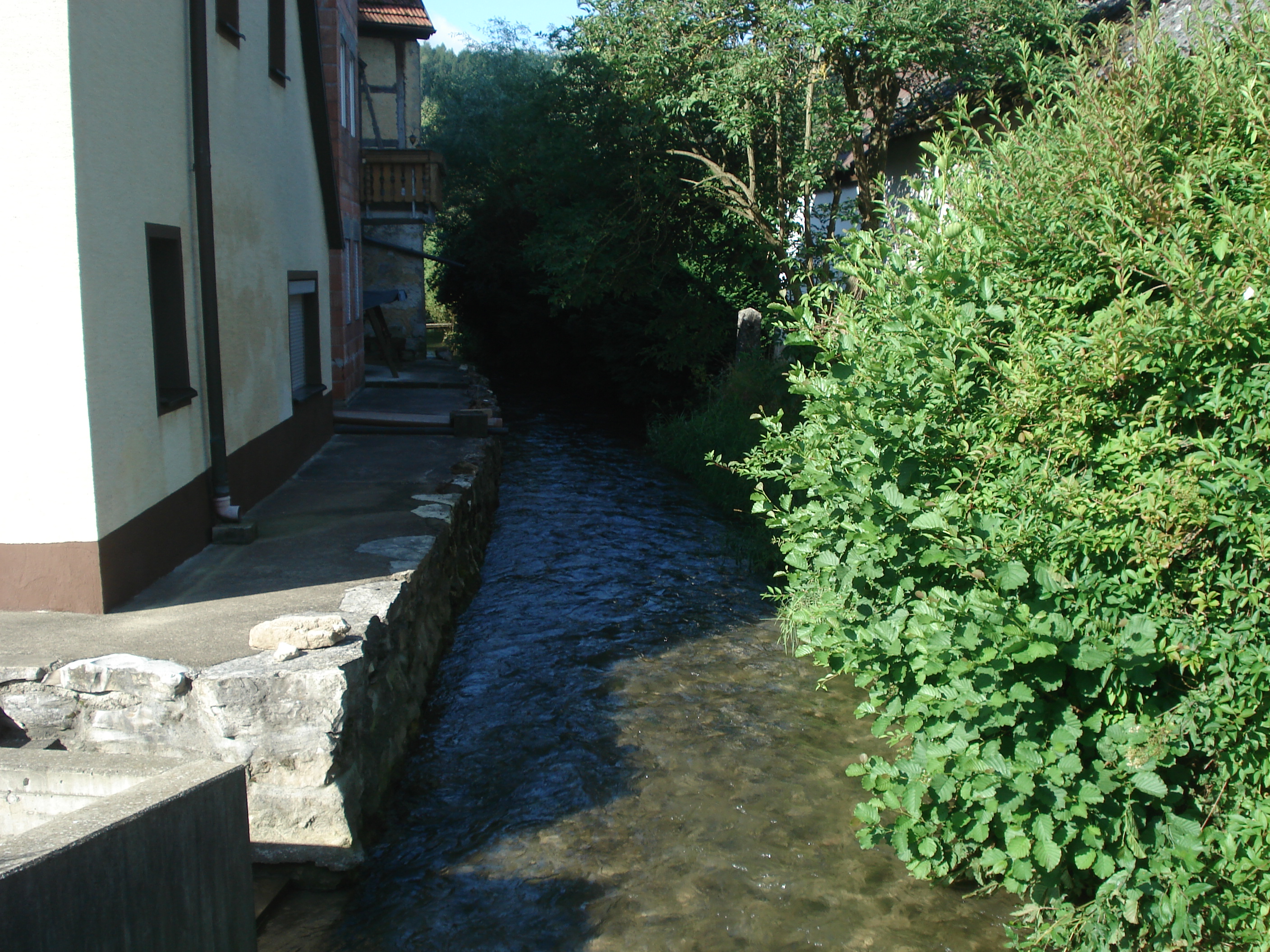
- The Thosbach in Wannbach (Pretzfeld)

Location
- Country: Germany
- State: Bavaria

Physical characteristics
- Mouth
  - location: Trubach
  - coordinates: 49.7446°N 11.2111°E

Basin features
- Progression: Trubach→ Wiesent→ Regnitz→ Main→ Rhine→ North Sea

Thosbach is a small river of Bavaria, Germany. It flows into the Trubach near Wannbach (a part of Pretzfeld).

== See also ==
- List of rivers of Bavaria
