= Moschendorf Castle =

Castle in Germany

- Gößweinstein-Moschendorf

Site information
- Type: hill castle, spur castle
- Code: DE-BY
- Condition: burgstall, a few wall remains, neck ditch

Location
- Location within Germany
- Coordinates: 49°47′56″N 11°19′31″E
- Height: 400 m above sea level (NHN)

Site history
- Built: recorded in 1464

Moschendorf Castle (German: Burgstall Moschendorf) is a levelled mediaeval hill castle at a height of 400 m above sea level (NHN) about 50 metres east of the village of Moschendorf, in the market municipality of Gößweinstein in the Franconian county of Forchheim in the south German state of Bavaria.

The castle was mentioned in the records in 1464 when the lords of Rabenstein and lords of Groß were named as occupants. The castle was destroyed in 1525 during the Peasants' War.

Of the former castle only a few wall remnants and a neck ditch remain.

== Literature ==
- Denis André Chevalley (revision editor) (1986). "Oberfranken". In Michael Petzet, Bayerisches Landesamt für Denkmalpflege [in German] (ed.). Denkmäler in Bayern : Ensembles, Baudenkmäler, archäologische Geländedenkmäler [Monuments in Bavaria: ensembles, monuments, archaeological site memorials]. Denkmäler in Bayern (in German). Vol. IV (Various ed.). München: Oldenbourg. ISBN 3-486-52395-3.
- Hellmut Kunstmann: Die Burgen der östlichen Fränkischen Schweiz. Aus der Reihe: Veröffentlichungen der Gesellschaft für Fränkische Geschichte Reihe IX: Darstellungen aus der Fränkischen Geschichte, Vol. 20. Kommissionsverlag Degener und Co., Neustadt/Aisch, 1965, pp. 179–183.
