= Unterailsfeld Castle =

Castle in Germany

- Gößweinstein-Unterailsfeld

Site information
- Type: lowland castle
- Code: DE-BY
- Condition: burgstall (no above-ground ruins)

Location
- Location within Germany
- Coordinates: 49°48′22″N 11°20′42″E
- Height: 360 m above sea level (NHN)

Site history
- Built: Late Middle Ages

The burgstall of Unterailsfeld Castle (German: Burgstall Unterailsfeld) is the site of a medieval lowland castle situated at a height of 360 m above sea level (NHN) in the village of Unterailsfeld, in the market municipality of Gößweinstein in the county of Forchheim in the south German state of Bavaria.

In 1525 its owners were named as the lords of Eyb. The castle was destroyed during the Peasants' War.

No above ground ruins of the old castle have survived.

== Literature ==
- Denis André Chevalley (revision editor) (1986). "Oberfranken". In Michael Petzet, Bayerisches Landesamt für Denkmalpflege [in German] (ed.). Denkmäler in Bayern : Ensembles, Baudenkmäler, archäologische Geländedenkmäler [Monuments in Bavaria: ensembles, monuments, archaeological site memorials]. Denkmäler in Bayern (in German). Vol. IV (Various ed.). München: Oldenbourg. ISBN 3-486-52395-3.
- Hellmut Kunstmann: Die Burgen der östlichen Fränkischen Schweiz. Aus der Reihe: Veröffentlichungen der Gesellschaft für Fränkische Geschichte Reihe IX: Darstellungen aus der Fränkischen Geschichte, Vol. 20. Kommissionsverlag Degener und Co., Neustadt/Aisch, 1965, pp. 183–185.
