= Bieberbach Castle =

Castle in Germany

- Biberbach
- Egloffstein-Bieberbach
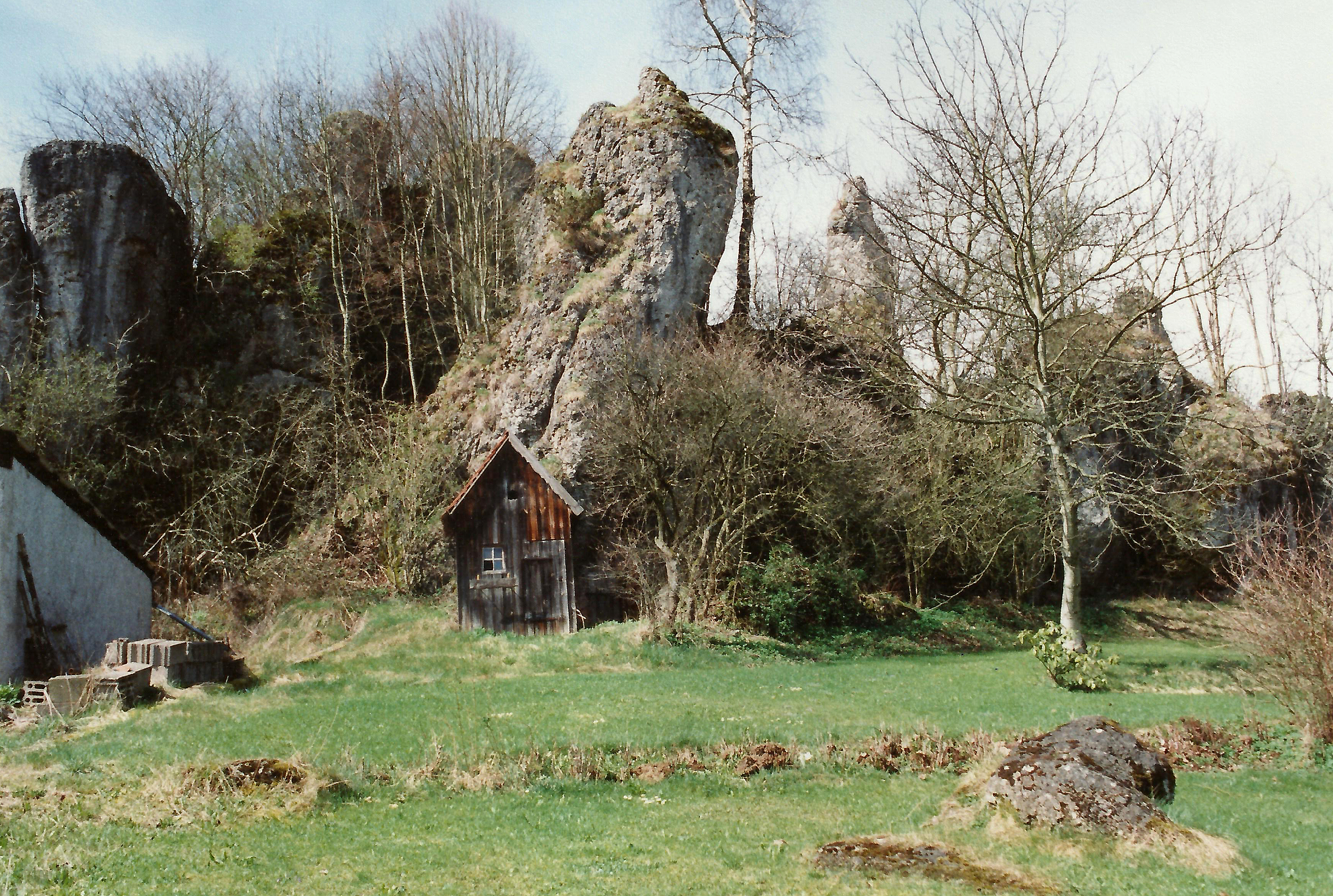
- Site of Bieberbach Castle (1998)

Site information
- Type: hill castle, spur castle
- Code: DE-BY
- Condition: burgstall (no above-ground ruins)

Location
- Location within Germany
- Coordinates: 49°43′40″N 11°17′24″E
- Height: 530 m above sea level (NN)

Site history
- Built: c. 1225

The burgstall or site of Bieberbach Castle is a ruined mediaeval spur castle at an elevation of 530 m above sea level (NN) on a rock formation in the southern part of the parish of Bieberbach, in the market municipality of Egloffstein in the county of Forchheim in the German state of Bavaria.

The castle was built around 1225 by the lords of Dachstetten. Later occupants were the lords of Egloffstein and the lords of Wichsenstein, who were recorded as ministeriales of the Bishopric of Bamberg. The castle was damaged in 1525 during the Peasants' War and finally destroyed during the Thirty Years' War. In the early 19th century the remains were carried away apart from a vaulted roof and a cellar.

== Literature ==
- Walter Heinz: Ehemalige Adelssitze im Trubachtal - Ein Wegweiser für Heimatfreunde und Wanderer. Verlag Palm und Enke, Erlangen und Jena, 1996, ISBN 3-7896-0554-9, pp. 186–190.
- Hellmut Kunstmann: Die Burgen der südwestlichen Fränkischen Schweiz. Aus der Reihe: Veröffentlichungen der Gesellschaft für Fränkische Geschichte Reihe IX: Darstellungen aus der Fränkischen Geschichte, Vol. 28. Kommissionsverlag Degener und Co., Neustadt/Aisch, 1990, pp. 239–243.
