= Reifenberg Castle =

- Weilersbach-Reifenberg

Site information
- Type: hill castle, spur castle
- Code: DE-BY
- Condition: burgstall, castle chapel

Location
- Coordinates: 49°45′21″N 11°08′09″E
- Height: 453.6 m above sea level (NN)

Site history
- Built: probably c. 1145

Garrison information
- Occupants: free knights, clerics

Reifenberg Castle (German: Burgstall Reifenberg) is a former spur castle on the Reifenberg hill (453.6 m above sea level (NN)) above the village of Reifenberg in the municipality of Weilersbach in the Upper Franconian county of Forchheim in the south German state of Bavaria.

== History ==
By 1145 the free knights of Reifenberg had moved from Ettling near Ingolstadt. They also went under the name of Speinshart and were founders of Speinshart Abbey. In 1160 Emperor Frederick I confirmed the estate of Reifenberg Castle to Bishop Eberhard II of Bamberg and in 1185 Pope Lucius III confirmed the estate to the Bishopric of Bamberg.

In 1430, during the Hussite Wars, the castle was damaged, but rebuilt in stages up to 1446. In 1460 the castle chapel of St. Nicholas was mentioned for the first time. In 1525, at the time of the Palatine Peasants' War, the castle had probably already become derelict. From 1607 to 1613 the Church of St. Nicholas (Vexier Chapel) was rebuilt and, in 1788, was given a baroque tower and hence its present appearance.

== Literature ==
- Hans-Michael Körner, Alois Schmid (eds.), Martin Ott: Handbuch der historischen Stätten. Bayern II Franken. Alfred Kröner Verlag, Stuttgart, 2006, ISBN 978-3-520-32501-3, pp. 436-437.
- Hellmut Kunstmann: Die Burgen der südwestlichen Fränkischen Schweiz. 2nd edition, Kommissionsverlag Degener & Co, Neustadt an der Aisch, 1990, pp. 121-134.
