= Wolkenstein Castle (Franconian Switzerland) =

Burgstall Wolkenstein
- Wolkenstein bei Ebermannstadt
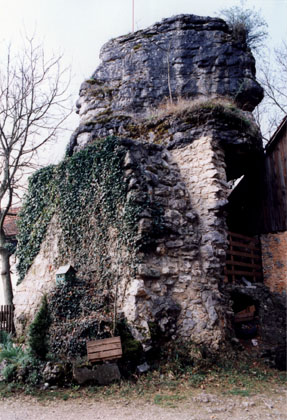
- Site of Wolkenstein Castle. The remains of a wall or tower

Site information
- Type: hill castle, spur castle
- Code: DE-BY
- Condition: burgstall (no above-ground ruins)

Location
- Coordinates: 49°45′19″N 11°14′24″E
- Height: 455 m above sea level (NN)

Site history
- Built: Probably 15th century

The burgstall of Wolkenstein Castle is the site of a late medieval aristocratic castle in the village of Wolkenstein, in the borough of Ebermannstadt in the county of Forchheim in the German state of Bavaria. The burgstall is in private hands and may not be visited.

== Location ==
The burgstall of the spur castle lies in the southwestern part of the parish of Wolkenstein at a height of 455 metres on a southwest-facing hill spur of the Thosberg. It is about 4.8 kilometres east of the church in Pretzfeld.

South of the old castle of Wolkenstein lies the burgstall of Eberhardstein in the valley of the Altenthalbach, to the southeast is the burgstall of Wichsenstein and to the west is that of Dietrichstein above the village of Lützelsdorf.

== History ==
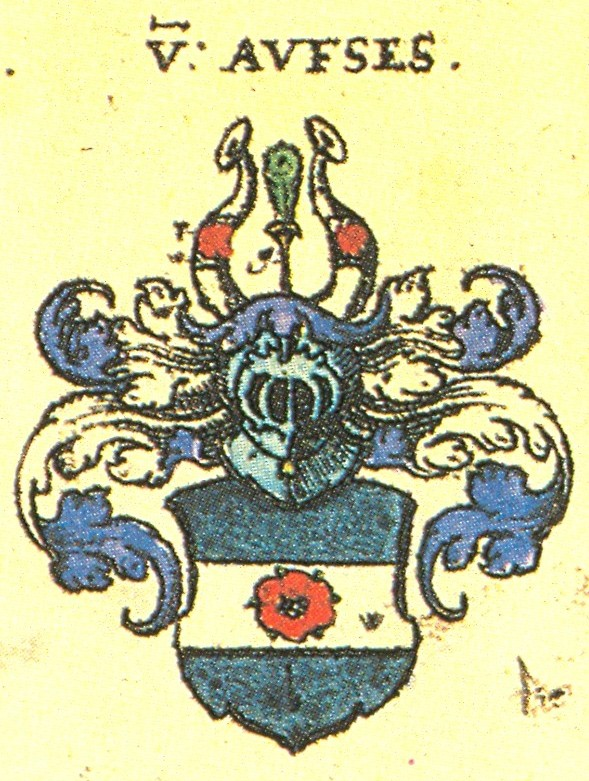
Aufseß coat of arms according to Siebmacher's Armorial

Neither the date of construction nor the builder of the castle are known. It was first mentioned in the records in 1470.

The castle, which was probably an allod, was occupied by the free knights of the House of Aufseß in the early 15th century. Conrad IX of Aufseß was held prisoner at the Altenburg during a feud with the Bishop of Bamberg, George I of Schaumberg (1459–1475), and, in 1470, had to grant the bishop right of access or Öffnungsrecht to Wolkenstein Castle.

In the period that followed several members of the House of Aufseß used the title "von Wolkenstein".

Whether the castle was destroyed during the Peasants' War, as a 1624 document suggests, is doubtful. In the otherwise very detailed lists of destroyed castles, it is not mentioned. This could mean, however, that the castle had already been destroyed or had fallen into ruins by that time.

== Description ==
Of the medieval site only a few wall remains on one of the rock formations have survived.

== Literature ==
- Walter Heinz: Ehemalige Adelssitze im Trubachtal. Palm und Enke Verlag, Erlangen/Jena, 1996, ISBN 3-7896-0554-9, pp. 236-243.
- Gustav Voit, Walter Rüfer: Eine Burgenreise durch die Fränkische Schweiz – Auf den Spuren des Zeichners A. F. Thomas Ostertag, 2nd edn., Verlag Palm & Enke, Erlangen, 1991, ISBN 3-7896-0064-4, pp. 238-241.
- Hellmut Kunstmann: Die Burgen der südwestlichen Fränkischen Schweiz. 2nd edn., Kommissionsverlag Degener & Co, Neustadt an der Aisch, 1990, pp. 284-288.
