= Thüngfelderstein Castle =

Castle in Germany

- Burgstall Thüngfelderstein; Burg Eberhardstein
- Gößweinstein-Morschreuth
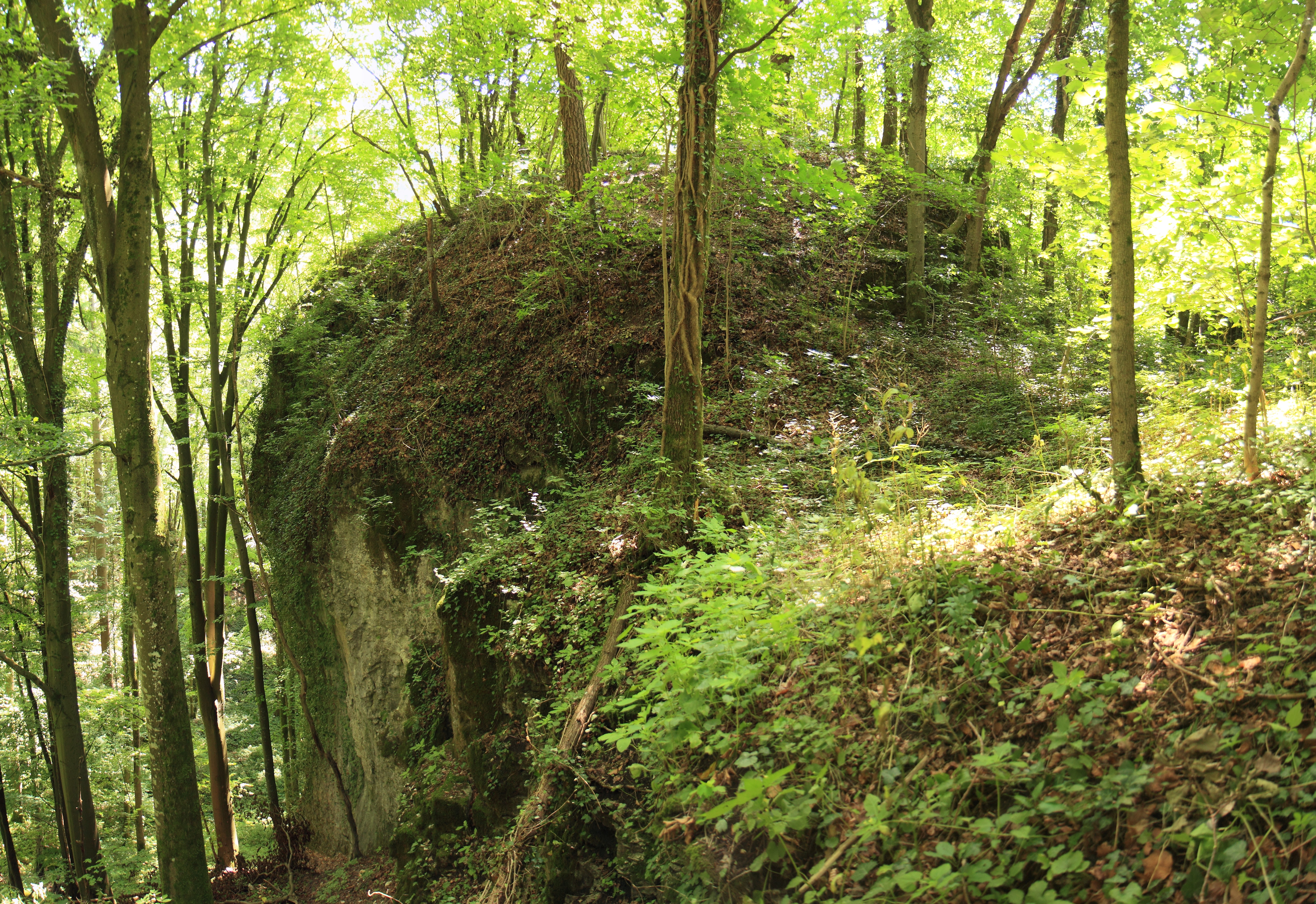
- Burgstall Thüngfelderstein

Site information
- Type: Hill castle, moat
- Code: DE-BY
- Condition: burgstall (no above-ground ruins)

Location
- Location within Germany
- Coordinates: 49°44′39″N 11°14′54″E
- Height: 400 m above sea level (NHN)

Site history
- Built: 12th century

The ruins of Thüngfelderstein Castle (German: Burgstall Thüngfelderstein), also called Eberhardstein Castle (Burg Eberhardstein), are the burgstall of a demolished hill castle on a block of rock near Morschreuth in the south German state of Bavaria. The site lies within the market municipality of Gößweinstein in the county of Forchheim.

The castle was built in the 12th century by the lords of Thüngfeld; in 1154, for example, an Eberjard von Thüngfeld is mentioned.

Of the former tower castle only a moat has survived.

== Literature ==
- Walter Heinz: Ehemalige Adelssitze im Trubachtal - Ein Wegweiser für Heimatfreunde und Wanderer. Verlag Palm und Enke, Erlangen and Jena, 1996, ISBN 3-7896-0554-9, pp. 226–231.
- Hellmut Kunstmann: Die Burgen der südwestlichen Fränkischen Schweiz. From the series: Veröffentlichungen der Gesellschaft für Fränkische Geschichte Reihe IX: Darstellungen aus der Fränkischen Geschichte, Vol. 28. Kommissionsverlag Degener und Co., Neustadt/Aisch 1990, pp. 261–262.
