= Ridge castle =

Type of medieval fortification

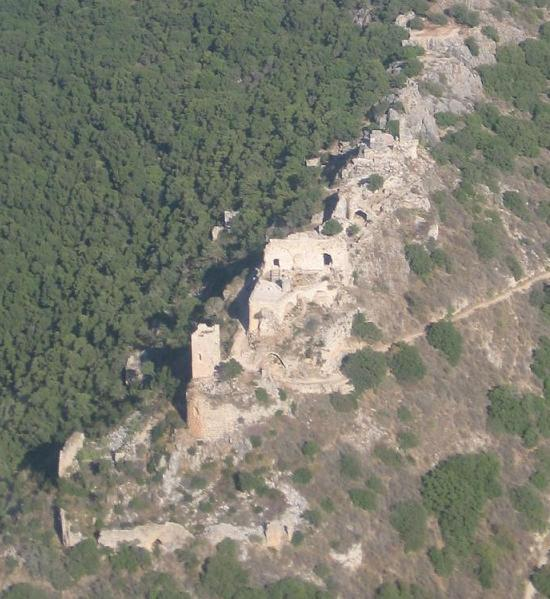
Ruins of Montfort Castle in Israel

A ridge castle (German: Kammburg) was a medieval fortification built on a ridge or the crest of mountain or hill chain. It was one of several types of hill castle.

Ridge castles were not a common type of fortification. While castles of this type were relatively well protected, they had the disadvantage that they could be attacked from two sides. The similar spur castle, located at the end of a ridge, is protected by drop offs on three sides.

For mutual protection, several such castles could be built within sight of one another.

- The Teutonic Knights' Montfort Castle, Israel, is a narrow ridge castle that relies for its defence on the steep rocky hillsides, lacking many of the innovations of the larger crusader castles and resembling smaller German baronial castles.

== Gallery ==
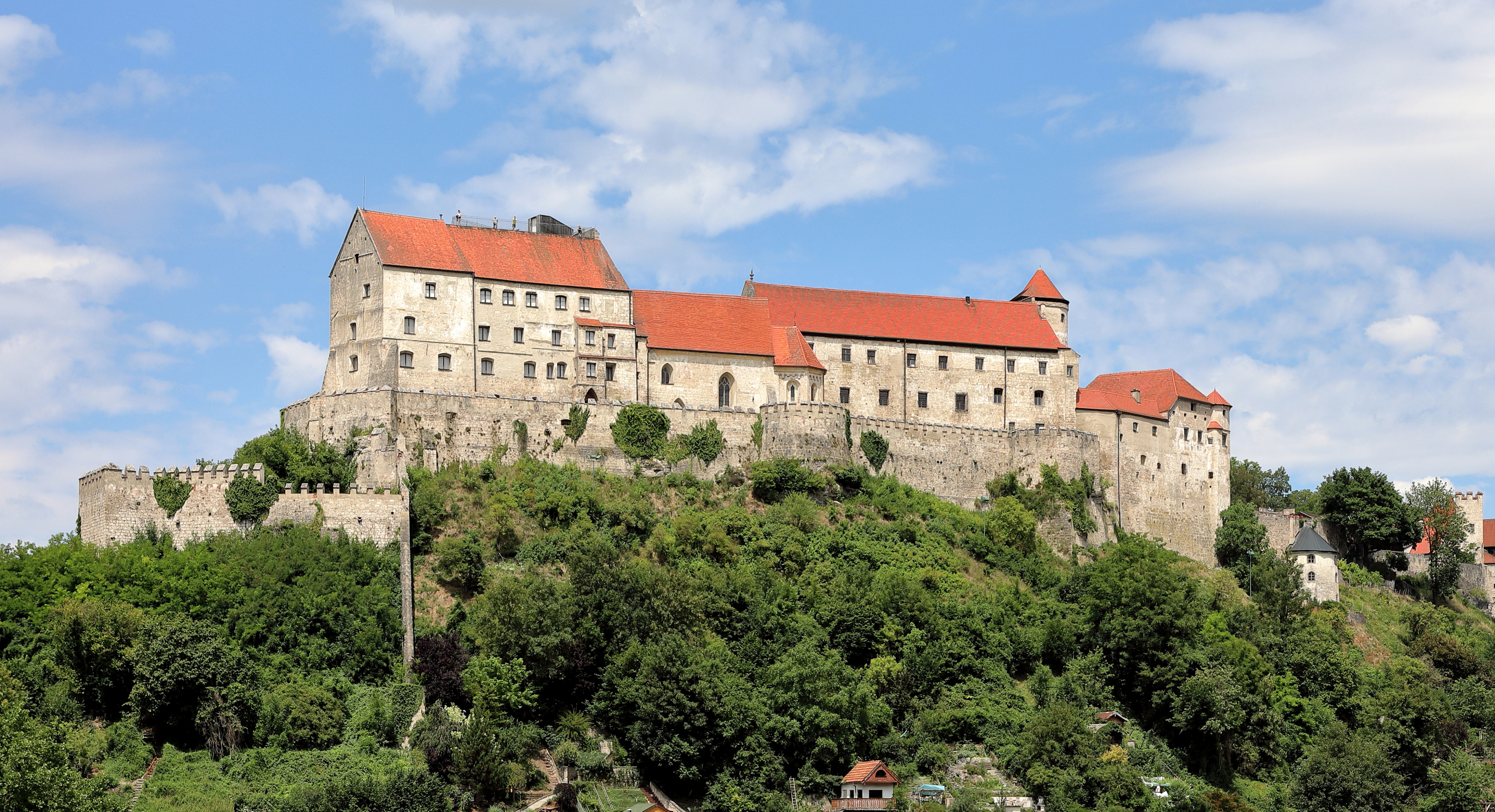
Burghausen Castle, Bavaria, Germany

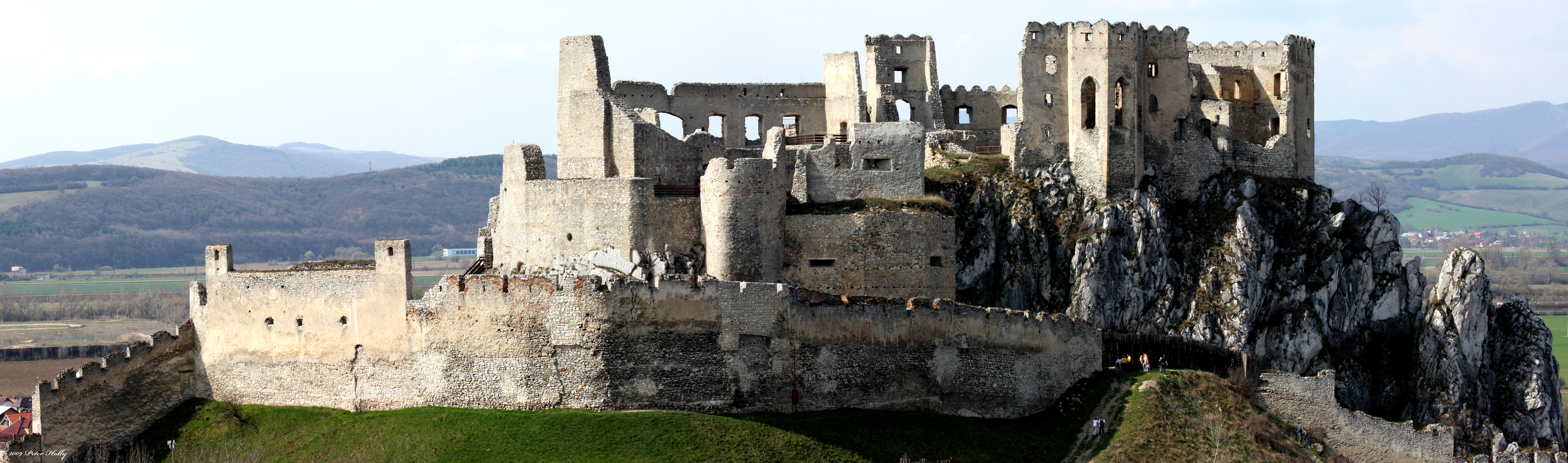
Beckov Castle, Slovakia

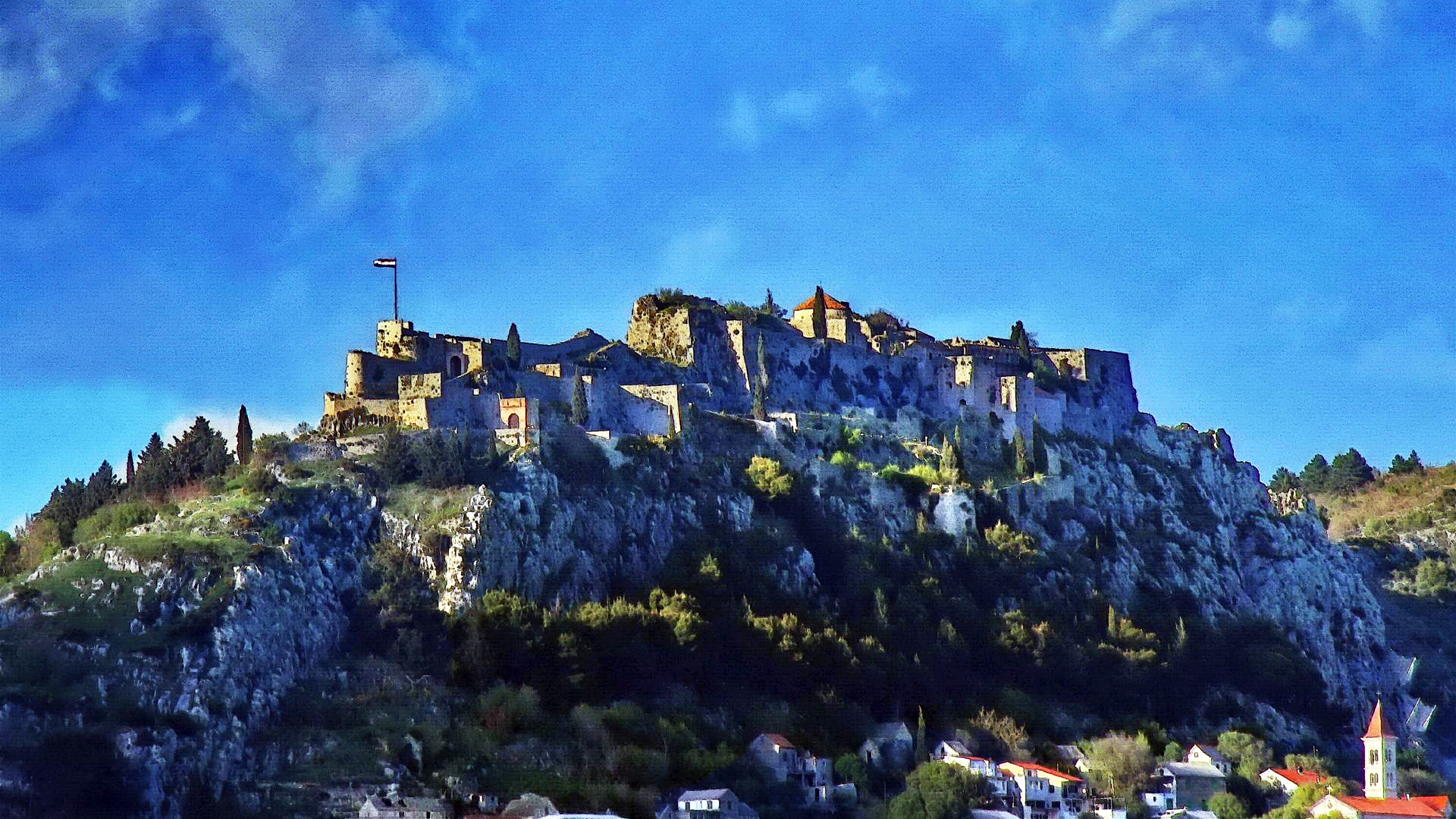
Klis Fortress near Split, Croatia

== Literature ==
- Michael Losse: Kleine Burgenkunde. Regionalia, Euskirchen 2011, ISBN 978-3-939722-39-7.
