= Wichsenstein =

- Village of Gößweinstein
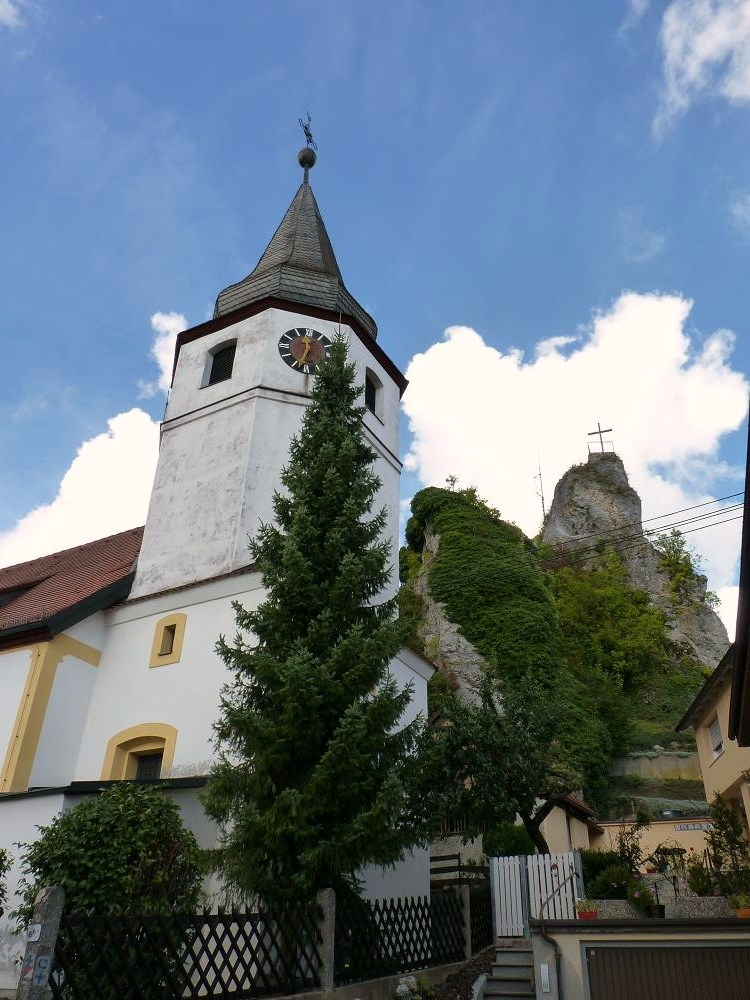
- St. Erhard Church and (behind) the Wichsenstein Rock
- Interactive map of Wichsenstein
- Location within Germany Location within Bavaria
- Coordinates: 49°44′15″N 11°16′5″E
- Country: Germany
- State: Bavaria
- District: Forchheim
- Municipality: Gößweinstein
- Elevation: 480–588 m (1,575–1,929 ft)
- Time zone: UTC+01:00 (CET)
  - Summer (DST): UTC+02:00 (CEST)
- Postal codes: 91327
- Dialling codes: 09197

Wichsenstein is a village in the municipality of Gößweinstein in the Upper Franconian county of Forchheim in Germany.

== Geography ==
Wichsenstein lies high up in the hills of Franconian Switzerland between the city of Nuremberg and the towns of Forchheim and Bayreuth about six kilometres southwest of Gößweinstein and fourteen kilometres east of Forchheim. The Wichsenstein Rock (Wichsensteiner Fels) towers over the centre of the village. It may be climbed using steps and, at a height of 587.8 m above sea level (NN), offers panoramic views over Franconian Switzerland.

== History ==
The independent parish of Wichsenstein was disbanded on 1 May 1978. The majority of its more than 500 inhabitants with the villages of Wichsenstein, Altenthal, Hardt, Sattelmannsburg and Ühleinshof were incorporated into the market town (Markt) of Gößweinstein. The villages of Eberhardstein, Pfaffenloh and Urspring with around 50 inhabitants joined Markt Pretzfeld.

== Transport ==
Wichsenstein is accessible on county roads.

The no. 222 bus links the village to the large county town of Forchheim and the municipal centre of Gößweinstein. On schooldays, there is an extra bus service, no. 226. In the evenings and at weekends there is a shuttle taxi service (Anrufsammeltaxi).

== See also ==
- Wichsenstein Castle
