= Tower castle =

Type of medieval fortification

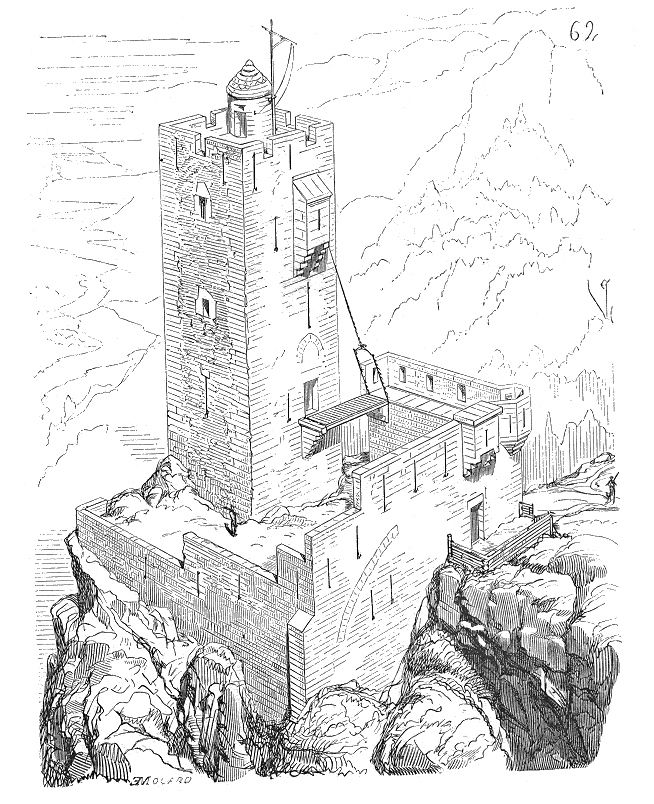
Artist's impression of a tower castle by Viollet-le-Duc

A tower castle is a small castle that mainly consists of a fortified tower or a tower-like structure that is built on natural ground. It is thus different from the motte-and-bailey castle, which it may resemble, but whose main defensive structure is built on a motte or artificial hill. The tower castle is occasionally also described as a tower house castle or a tower house.

Sometimes, during the development of a castle, it might be converted from a tower castle to a motte-and-bailey type, if the initial, ground level site is later remodelled by the construction of an artificial mound for the keep or Bergfried. The habitable but also fortified tower castle became the permanent private residence of numerous lords during the 11th and 12th centuries.

Since many tower castles had at least a few additional structures such as a curtain wall, often only a few metres long, its overlap with an "ordinary" castle is fluid, as is its transition to the fortified house.

== See also ==
- Fortified house
- Tower house
- Watchtower

== Literature ==
- Horst Wolfgang Böhme, Reinhard Friedrich, Barbara Schock-Werner (eds.): Wörterbuch der Burgen, Schlösser und Festungen. Philipp Reclam, Stuttgart, 2004, ISBN 3-15-010547-1, pp. 248–249.
