= Gößweinstein Castle =

- Schloss Gößweinstein
- Gößweinstein
- Gößweinstein Castle (2026)

Site information
- Type: hill castle, summit site
- Code: DE-BY
- Condition: preserved or largely preserved

Location
- Location within Bavaria Location within Germany
- Coordinates: 49°46′13.42″N 11°20′3.95″E

Site history
- Built: before 1076

Gößweinstein Castle (German: Burg Gößweinstein), also called Schloss Gößweinstein, is a mediaeval hilltop castle in Gößweinstein in the county of Forchheim in the German state of Bavaria. It towers high above the market town and the River Wiesent and may have been the inspiration for Richard Wagner's grail castle in his opera, Parsifal. The castle is a Bavarian listed building, no. D-4-74-129-10.

== History ==
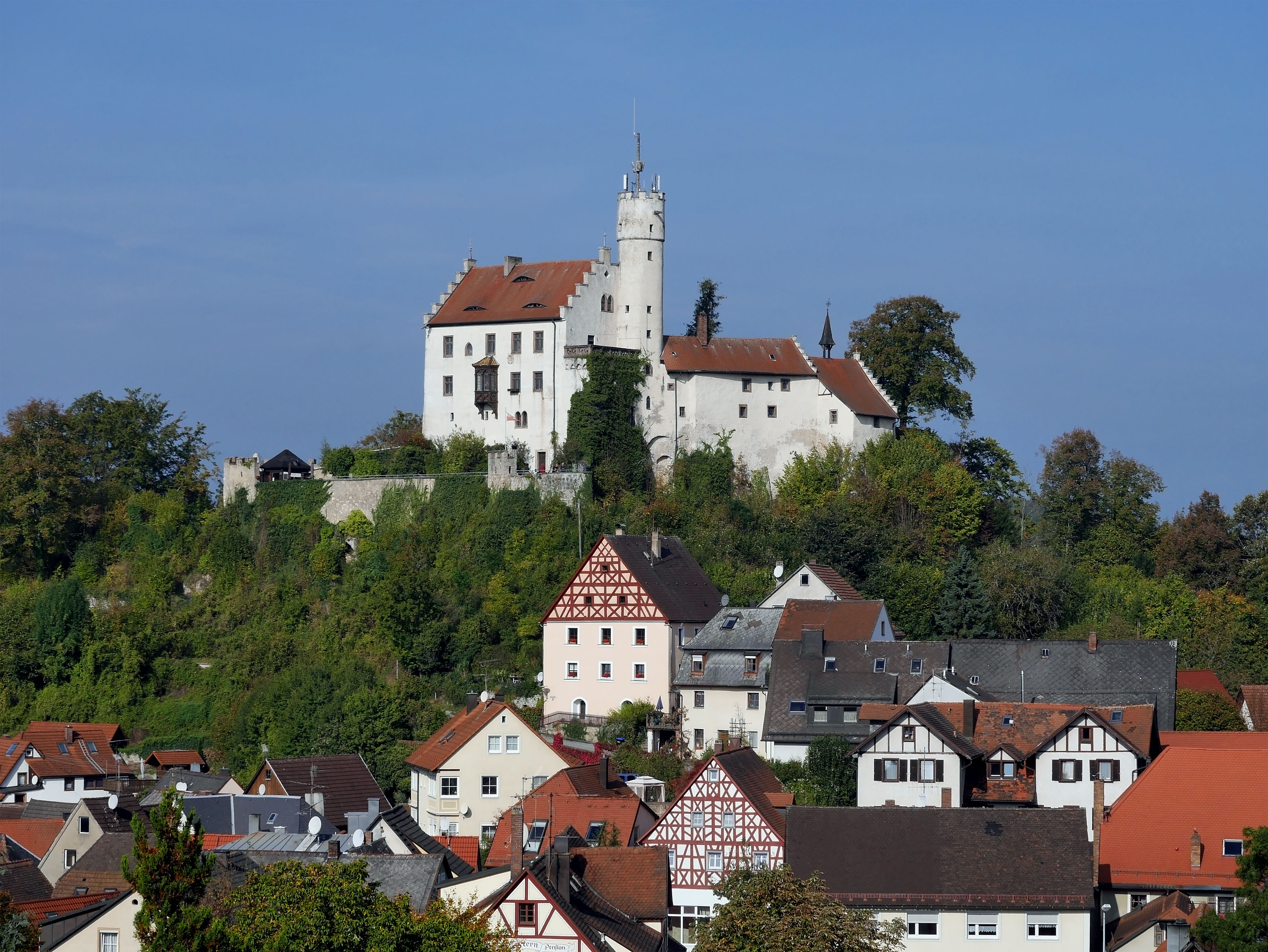
Gößweinstein Castle seen from the Kreuzberg (Oct 2014)

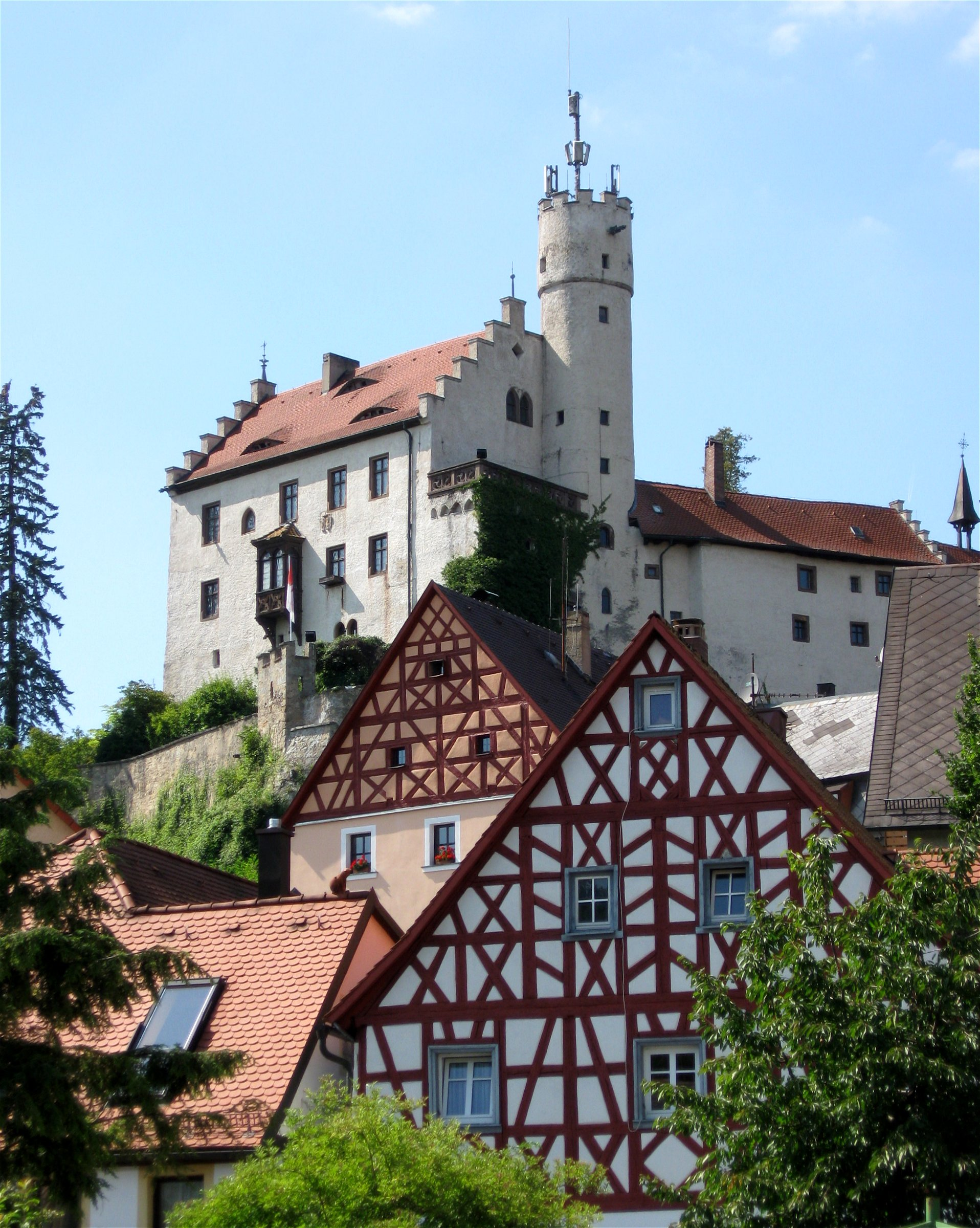

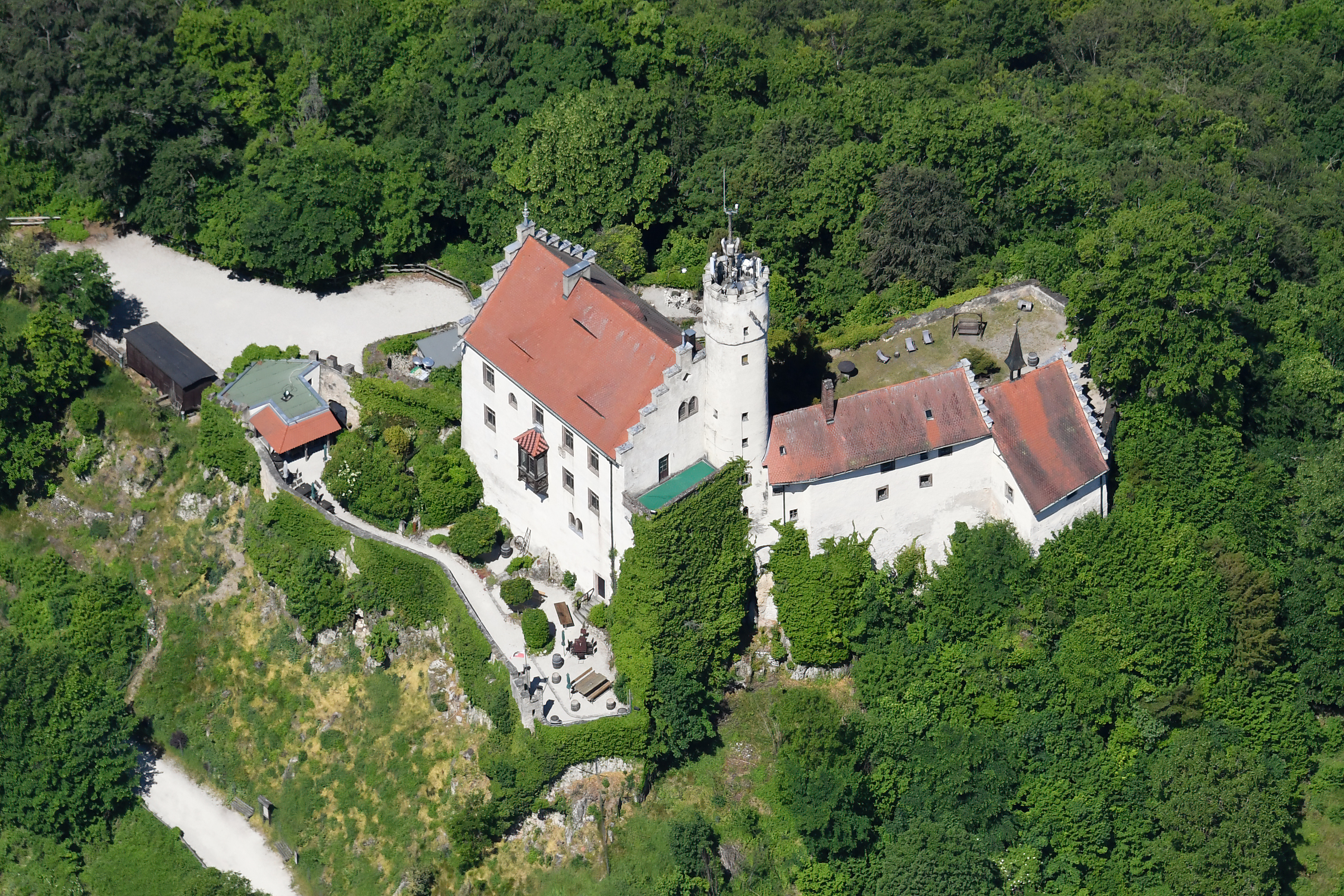
Aerial view of Gößweinstein Castle

The castle was probably named after its founder, Count Gozwin. He was killed in 1065, after he had invaded the territory of the Bishop of Würzburg. The first record of Goswinesteyn castle is dated to 1076. At that time, Emperor Henry IV had Bishop Burchard II of Halberstadt, who had become embroiled in the Saxon Rebellion, incarcerated there, a fact which suggests it was already a strong fortress.

From the time of Bishop Otto of Bamberg there is evidence that the castle became part of the Bamberg estate. From 1348 to 1780 it was the seat of a vogtei under the bishops of Bamberg.

In 1525, during the Peasants' War it was destroyed and rebuilt. During the Second Margrave War in 1553 the castle was again destroyed and later rebuilt.

The castle became a Bavarian possession as a result of secularisation of the Bishopric of Bamberg in 1803. The Bavarian state sold the castle in 1875 to Pauline Rabeneck, a landowning widow from the Manor (Rittergut) of Aspach near Uffenheim. In 1890 Baron Edgar of Sohlern purchased the castle and had it remodelled in the Neogothic style. The castle chapel also has Late Gothic statues.

== Today ==
The castle is still in the hands of the von Sohlen family. It houses a medieval museum which may be visited for a small entrance fee and there is a beer garden and terrace with good views over the Wiesent valley and village of Gößweinstein.

== Literature ==
- Ursula Pfistermeister: Wehrhaftes Franken - Band 3: Burgen, Kirchenburgen, Stadtmauern um Bamberg, Bayreuth und Coburg, Fachverlag Hans Carl GmbH, Nuremberg, 2002, ISBN 3-418-00387-7, pp. 56–58.
- Günter Dippold: Zur Geschichte von Burg und Ort Gößweinstein. In: Günter Dippold (Hrsg.): Gößweinstein. Sakrale Mitte der Fränkischen Schweiz. Staffelstein, 1998, ISBN 3-9804630-2-8, pp. 12–28.
- Gustav Voit, Brigitte Kaulich, Walter Rüfer: Vom Land im Gebirg zur Fränkischen Schweiz - Eine Landschaft wird entdeckt. (Schriftenreihe des Fränkische-Schweiz-Vereins, Band 8) Verlag Palm und Enke, Erlangen, 1992, ISBN 3-7896-0511-5, pp. 103–108.
- Björn-Uwe Abels, Joachim Zeune, et al.: Führer zu archäologischen Denkmälern in Deutschland, Band 20: Fränkische Schweiz. Konrad Theiss Verlag GmbH und Co., Stuttgart, 1990, ISBN 3-8062-0586-8, pp. 162–164.
- Hellmut Kunstmann: Die Burgen der östlichen Fränkischen Schweiz. Kommissionsverlag Ferdinand Schöningh, Wurzburg, 1965, pp. 26–63.
