= Trubach =

River in Bavaria, Germany

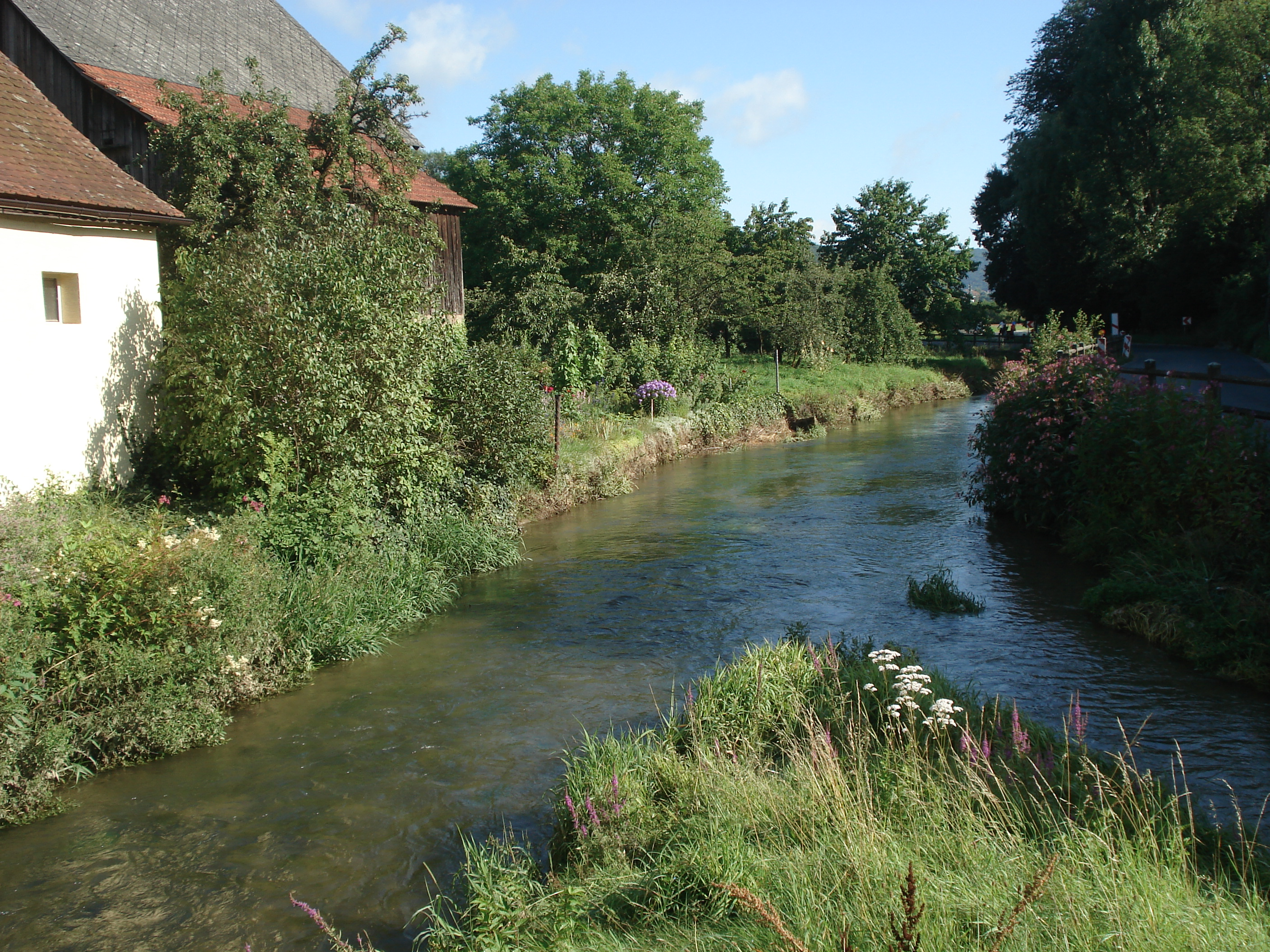
- The Mühlbach, right-hand branch of the Trubach, in Pretzfeld

Location
- Country: Germany
- State: Bavaria

Physical characteristics
- Mouth
  - location: Wiesent
  - coordinates: 49.7531°N 11.1612°E
- Length: 20.7 km (12.9 mi)

Basin features
- Progression: Wiesent→ Regnitz→ Main→ Rhine→ North Sea

Trubach (German pronunciation: [ˈtʁuːbax]) is a river in Bavaria, Germany. It flows into the Wiesent near Pretzfeld.

== See also ==
- List of rivers of Bavaria
