= Gößweinstein =

- Municipality
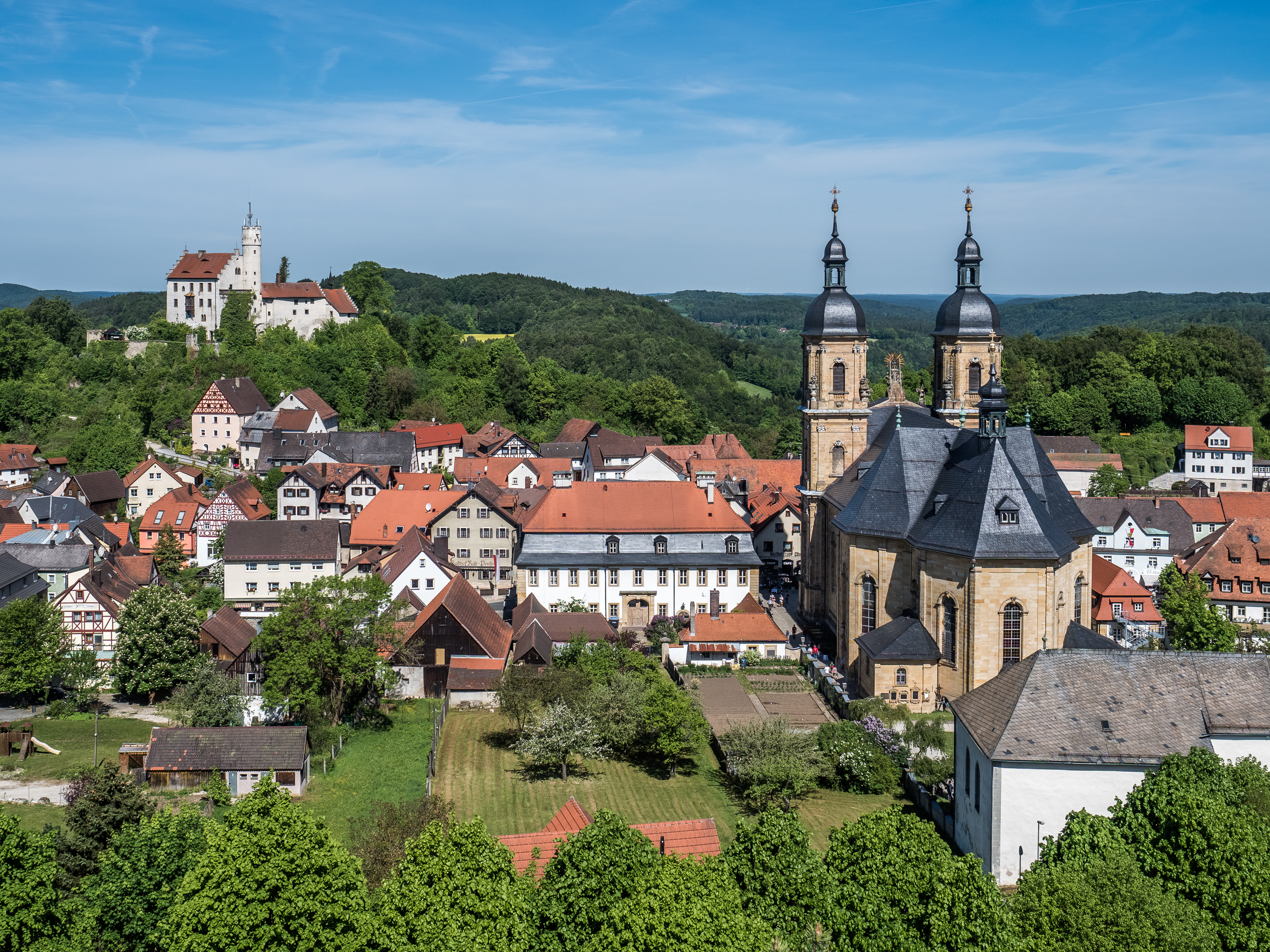
- View of the town

- Coat of arms

- Location of Gößweinstein within Forchheim district
- Interactive map of Gößweinstein
- Location within Germany Location within Bavaria
- Coordinates: 49°46′N 11°19′E
- Country: Germany
- State: Bavaria
- Admin. region: Oberfranken
- District: Forchheim
- Subdivisions: 30 Ortsteile

Government
  - Mayor (2020–26): Hanngörg Zimmermann

Area
  - Total: 57.70 km^{2} (22.28 sq mi)
- Elevation: 312 m (1,024 ft)

Population (2025-12-31)
  - Total: 4,290
  - Density: 74.4/km^{2} (193/sq mi)
- Time zone: UTC+01:00 (CET)
  - Summer (DST): UTC+02:00 (CEST)
- Postal codes: 91327
- Dialling codes: 09242
- Vehicle registration: FO
- Website: www.goessweinstein.de

Gößweinstein is a municipality in the district of Forchheim in Bavaria in Germany. It lies within the region known as Franconian Switzerland.

== Districts ==
- Allersdorf
- Altenthal
- Behringersmühle
- Bösenbirkig
- Etzdorf
- Geiselhöhe
- Gößweinstein
- Hardt
- Hartenreuth
- Hühnerloh
- Hungenberg
- Kleingesee
- Kohlstein
- Krachershöhe
- Leimersberg
- Leutzdorf
- Moritz
- Morschreuth
- Moschendorf
- Prügeldorf
- Sachsendorf
- Sachsenmühle
- Sattelmannsburg
- Stadelhofen
- Stempfermühle
- Türkelstein
- Ühleinshof
- Unterailsfeld
- Wichsenstein
- Wölm

== History ==
The first record of Goswinesteyn Castle is from 1076. Prior to 1102 the Hochstift Bamberg became the owner of the castle. The prince-bishop of Bamberg Friedrich Carl von Schönborn (ruled from 1729 until 1746) elevated Gößweinstein's status to a Market. During the Secularization in 1803, the area of the Hochstift Bamberg was transferred to Bavaria. During the Bavarian territorial reforms in 1978, the formerly independent communities of Morschreuth, Wichsenstein, Behringersmühle, Kleingesee, Leutzdorf, Stadelhofen, Unterailsfeld and part of the community Tüchersfeld were integrated into Gößweinstein.

== Culture and sights ==
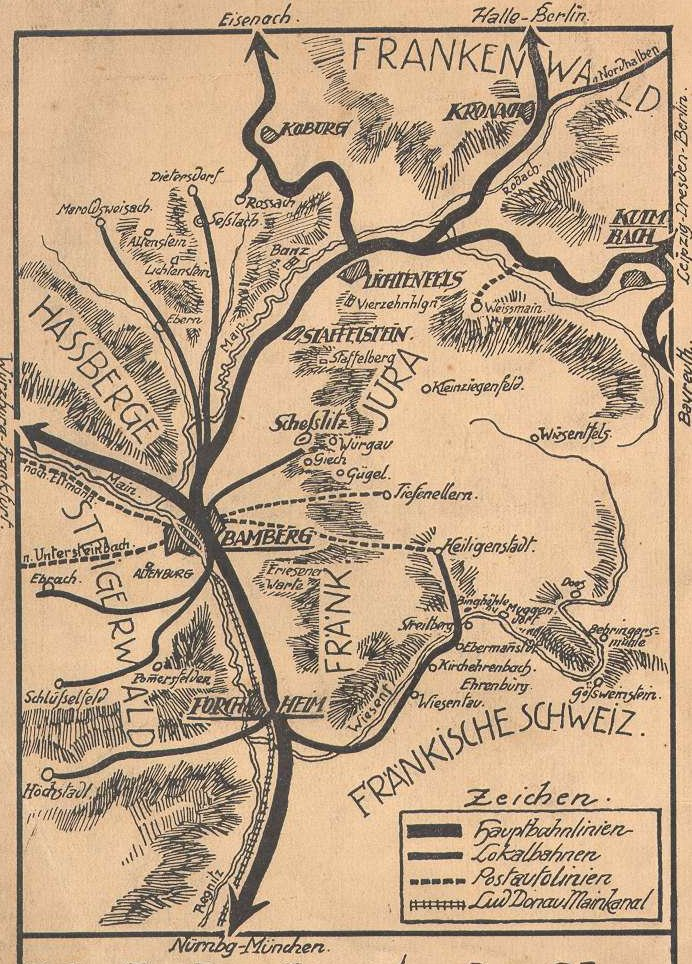
Map from 1912 with Gößweinstein on the lower right side

=== Museums ===
- Franconian Toy Museum Gößweinstein
- Natural history and geological Collection in the Haus des Gastes
- Steam locomotive train (Dampfbahn Fränkische Schweiz)

=== Buildings ===
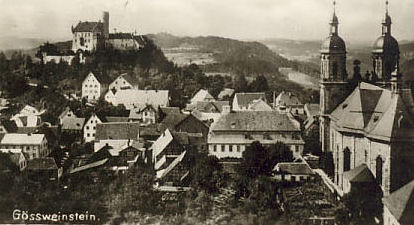
Castle and basilica in 1928

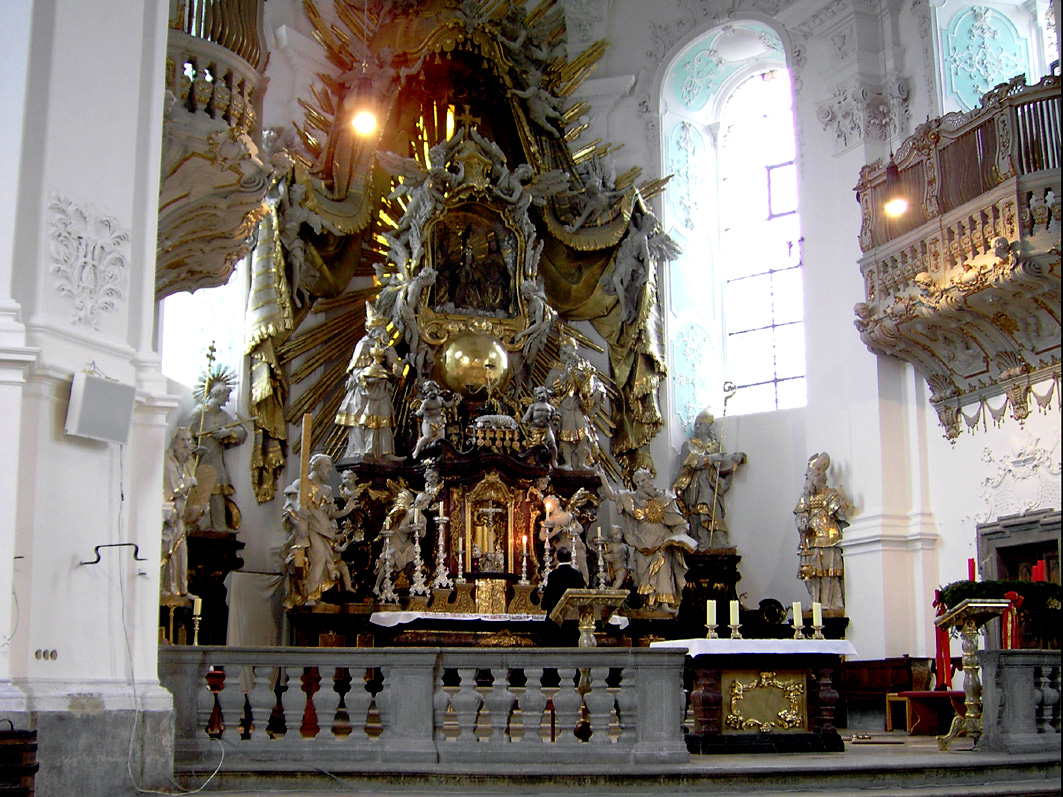
The Apsis of the Basilica minor of the Holy Trinity

- Pilgrimage church of the Holy Trinity, 1730–1739 built during the reign of Fürstbischof Friedrich Carl von Schönborn according to plans by Balthasar Neumann, who also supervised the construction. Franciscan padre Prof. Dr. Luchesius Spätling applied for the denomination as Basilica minor. The church was elevated to the papal Basilica minor in 1948 by Pope Pius XII.
- Gößweinstein Castle
- Viktor-von-Scheffel-memorial On both sides, there are the lines of the poem "Ausfahrt" (Exit):

Ich fahr’ in die Welt!
Mein Hutschmuck die Rose, mein Lager im Moose,
Der Himmel mein Zelt.
Mag lauern und trauern, wer will, hinter Mauern –
Ich fahr’ in die Welt!

=== Lookout points ===
- Gernerfels
- Kreuzberg with high cross
- Martinswand (Bellevue)
- Pavillon Wagnershöhe
- Ludwigshöhe (Theaterhöhle)
- Bärenstein (529 m NN)
- Fischersruh
- Nuremberg Chapel
- Aussichtsfelsen Wichsenstein (585 m NN)

== Politics ==
The municipal council in Gößweinstein has 16 members plus an extraofficial mayor.

	CSU	SPD	FW	Jugend und Frauen	Bürgergemeinschaft	Bürger vertreten Bürger	Total
2002	5	3	3	2	2	1	16 seats

(local elections on March 3, 2002)
