= Spur castle =

Castle on a spur

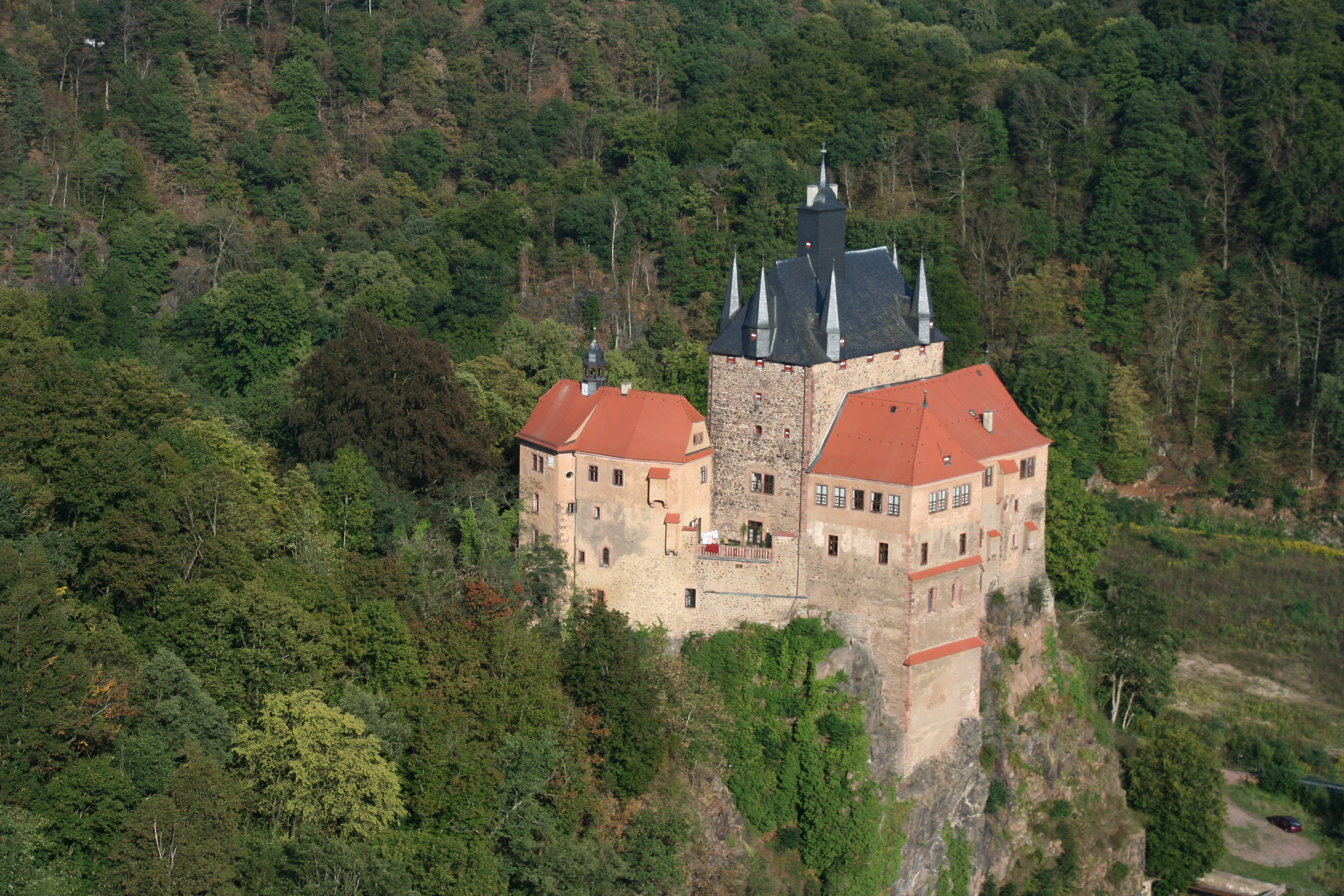
Kriebstein Castle, Saxony, Germany

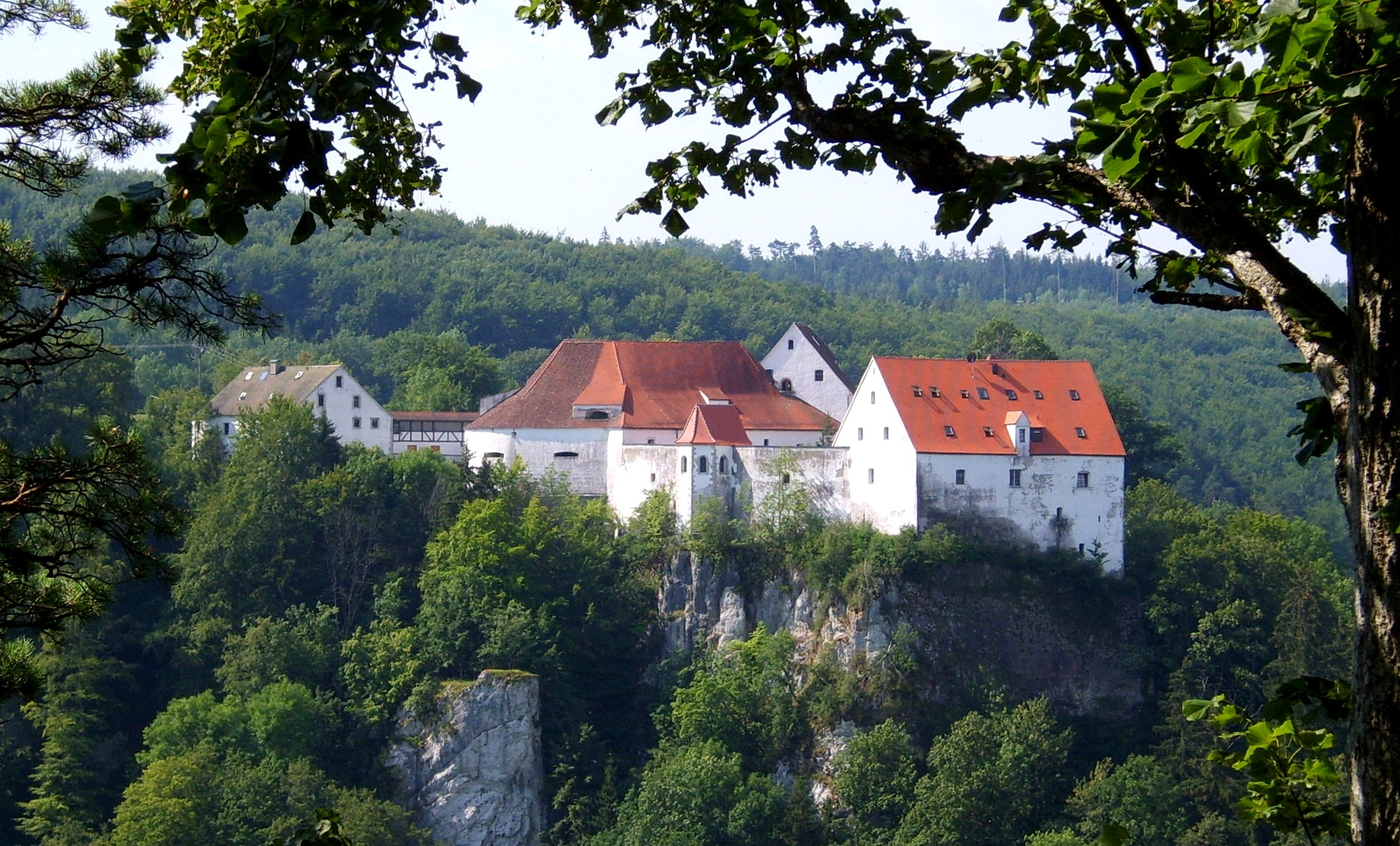
Wildenstein Castle in south-west Germany

A spur castle is a type of medieval fortification that is sited on a spur of a hill or mountain for defensive purposes. Ideally, it would be protected on three sides by steep hillsides; the only vulnerable side being that where the spur joins the hill from which it projects. By contrast, a ridge castle is only protected by steep terrain on two sides.

== Description ==
A spur castle was one of several types of hill castle. Depending on the local topography, a spur castle may have relied mainly on its inaccessible position or may have integrated further features such as shield walls and towers into the defences. In addition, castle builders may have improved the natural defences of the terrain by hewing into them to make the hillsides harder to climb and reduce the risk of landslide. A classic feature is the neck ditch, cutting off the spur from the rest of the hill. A long spur castle is sometimes, but not always, subdivided into a lower ward and a more strongly defended upper ward (or even a succession of three or more wards).

High spur and hilltop castles were built and improved by the Franks to hinder increasing use of the counterweight trebuchet. In the case of spur castles, heavy siege machinery could only be deployed on the uphill side enabling defensive works and forces to be concentrated there.

== Examples ==
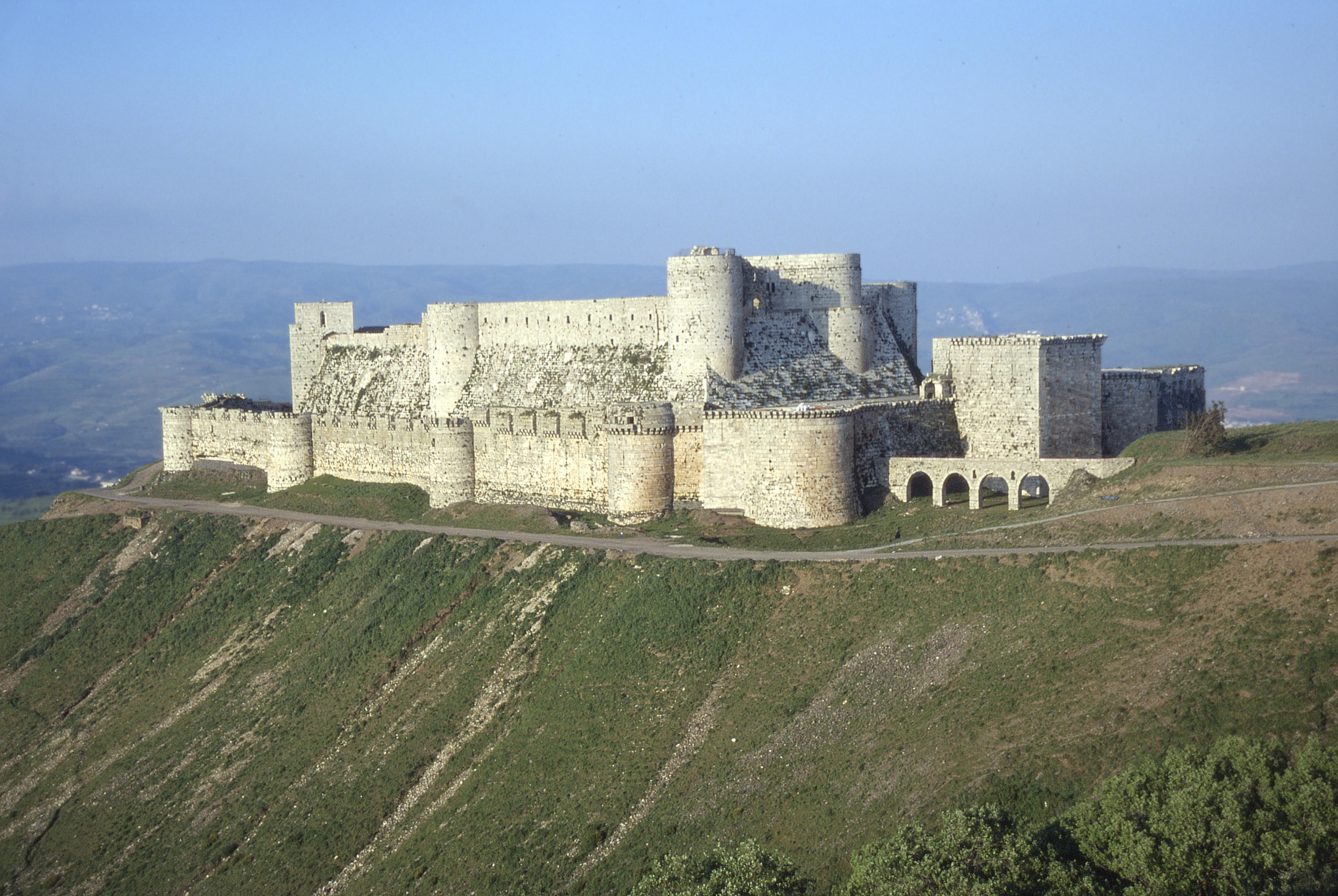
The Krak des Chevaliers from the southwest

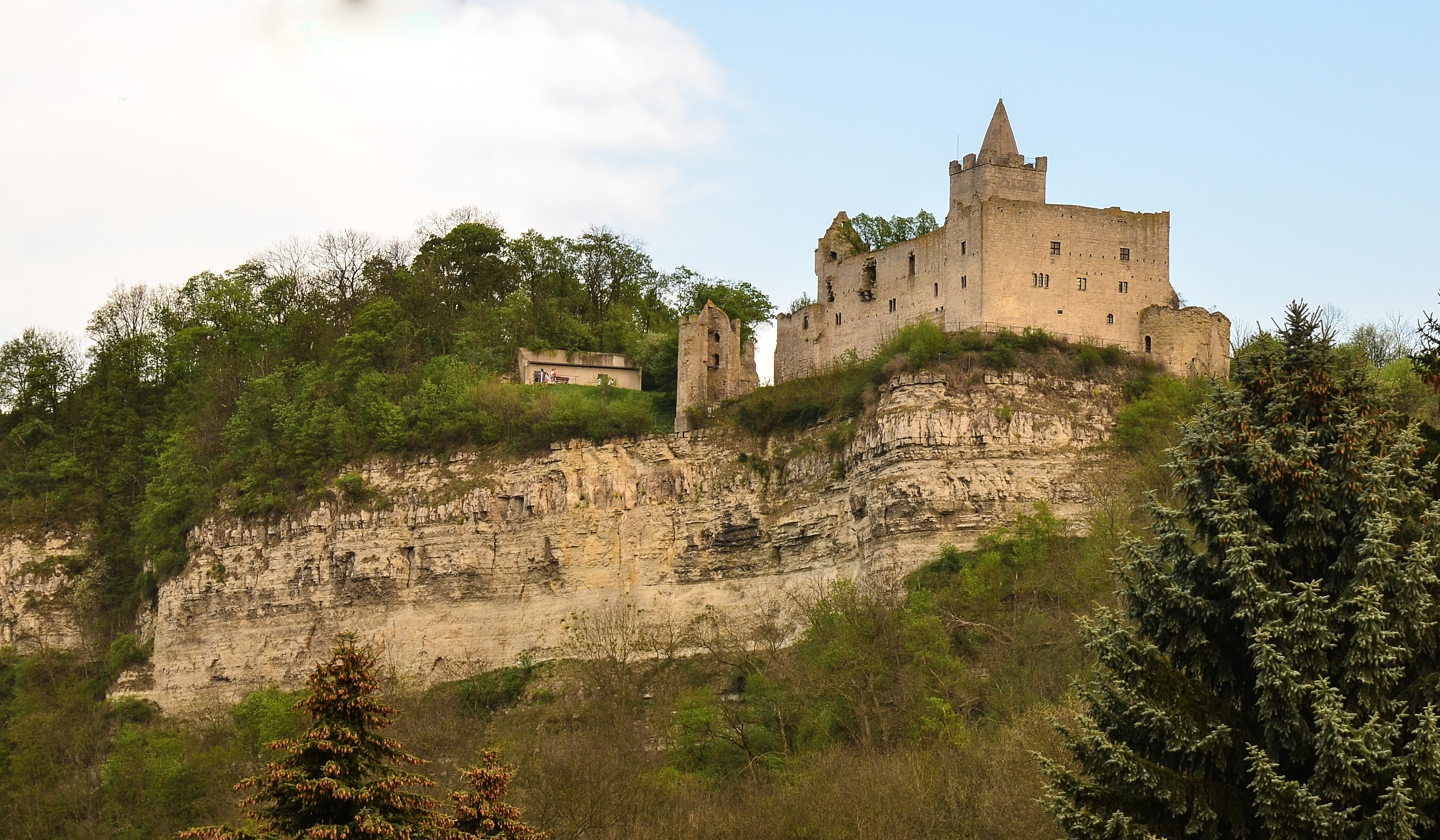
Rudelsburg in the Saale valley, Germany

- The crusader castle Krak des Chevaliers in Syria lies on a spur accessible from the south. At the same time, it has strong concentric castle defences on all sides.
- The Citadel of Salah Ed-Din, western Syria, has defences concentrated on the vulnerable side of the spur, most notably a deep ditch. The lower bailey at Saône (as the French call it) has weaker walls and towers.
- The Alamut Castle in Persia (now northwestern Iran), was atop a narrow rock base rising approximately 180 m. It was thought to be impregnable to direct attack.
- The Alcázar of Segovia, central Spain, is on a narrow spur with deep drops all around except from the east where it is approached on level ground.
- Stirling Castle, Scotland, is on a narrow spur with drops on three sides and a gentle slope providing access from the south-east.
- Château de Chinon, central France, was used by the counts of Anjou in the 12th century. In 1205, it was captured by the French king and was the largest castle in the Loire valley.
- Poenari Castle, elevated on a clifftop 440 m over the river Argeș in Romania. Used as Vlad the Impaler's fortress.
- Château de Montségur in France was used by the Cathars and lies on the spur of a mountain.
- Cefnllys Castle in Wales, is a series of 2 castles in Wales.

== See also ==
- Castle
- Hill castle
- Hillside castle
- Hilltop castle
- Ridge castle
