= Pretzfeld =

- Municipality
- Coat of arms

- Location of Pretzfeld within Forchheim district
- Interactive map of Pretzfeld
- Location within Germany Location within Bavaria
- Coordinates: 49°45′N 11°10′E
- Country: Germany
- State: Bavaria
- Admin. region: Oberfranken
- District: Forchheim
- Subdivisions: 13 Ortsteile

Government
  - Mayor (2020–26): Steffen Lipfert

Area
  - Total: 24.21 km^{2} (9.35 sq mi)
- Elevation: 293 m (961 ft)

Population (2025-12-31)
  - Total: 2,349
  - Density: 97.03/km^{2} (251.3/sq mi)
- Time zone: UTC+01:00 (CET)
  - Summer (DST): UTC+02:00 (CEST)
- Postal codes: 91362
- Dialling codes: 09194
- Vehicle registration: FO
- Website: www.Pretzfeld.de

Pretzfeld (German pronunciation: [ˈpʁɛtsfɛlt]) is a municipality in the district of Forchheim in Bavaria in Germany.

== Geography ==
=== Geographical location ===
The municipality is located in the south-western part of Upper Franconia, in Franconian Switzerland. The region is known for growing and processing fruit. Of the approx. 2500 ha total area, 1100 ha are forest. The town of Pretzfeld lies in the west of the municipality, near the confluence of the Trubach and the Wiesent.

=== Districts ===
The pretzfeld municipality has 13 districts:

- Altreuth
- Eberhardstein
- Hagenbach
- Hetzelsdorf
- Kolmreuth
- Lützelsdorf
- Oberzaunsbach
- Pfaffenloh
- Poppendorf
- Pretzfeld
- Unterzaunsbach
- Urspring
- Wannbach

== Economy and Infrastructure ==
The largest closed sweet cherry growing area in Germany and one of the largest in western Europe extends around the Pretzfeld market. Due to the warm climate and nutrient-rich soils, there are over 200,000 sweet cherry trees on 1700 ha.

In the municipality there are the breweries Nikl-Bräu in Pretzfeld, Meister in Unterzaunsbach and Penning-Zeißler in Hetzelsdorf. There are also several distilleries, one of the best known is the Haas distillery with an annual production of approx. 60 - 70,000 bottles.

From the semiconductor laboratory initiated by Walter Schottky in 1946, a plant for power semiconductors emerged, which last operated as the Infineon subsidiary eupec (European Power-Semiconductor and Electronic Company) before it was closed in 2002.

== Architecture ==
- The Rococo parish church of St. Kilian was built from 1742 to 1761 by the Bamberg architect Johann Jakob Michael Küchel.
- The Pretzfeld Castle was mentioned in 1145 (or 1182) as the seat of the "Hademar de Bretevelt" (wide field). In its present form it dates from the middle of the 18th century. From 1375 the castle belonged to those of Wiesenthau, from 1522 to those of Stiebar, in 1754 the Bavarian Minister, Count von Seinsheim, received the fief, in 1852 the Nuremberg merchant Kohn bought property, which went to the Herrmann family through marriage, the current owners.
- The Jewish cemetery, which has existed since the 17th century, mainly contains graves from the 18th and 19th centuries.
