= Altes Schloss =

Altes Schloss or Altes Schloß (German, 'Old Palace' or 'Old Castle') is the name of several structures:

== Germany ==
- Altes Schloss (Affalterthal), Egloffstein, county of Forchheim, Bavaria
- Altes Schloss (Bad Berneck), Bad Berneck, county of Heilbronn, Bavaria
- Altes Schloss, Bad Bocklet, Bad Bocklet Bavaria
- Bosselstein Castle (Altes Schloss), Idar-Oberstein, county of Birkenfeld, Rhineland-Palatinate
- Altes Schloss (Büdesheim), Büdesheim, Main-Kinzig-Kreis, Hesse
- Altes Schloß (Dermbach), Dermbach, Wartburgkreis, Thuringia
- Altes Schloss (Dillingen), Dillingen, county of Saarlouis, Saarland
- Altes Schloss (Drügendorf), demolished Wallburg near Drügendorf (Eggolsheim), county of Forchheim, Bavaria
- Altes Schloss (Freyenstein), Freyenstein, county of Ostprignitz-Ruppin, Brandenburg
- Altes Schloss (Gaildorf), Gaildorf, county of Schwäbisch Hall, Baden-Württemberg
- Altes Schloss (Gammertingen), Gammertingen, county of Sigmaringen, Baden-Württemberg
- Altes Schloss (Gießen), Gießen, county of Gießen, Hesse
- Altes Schloss (Grevenbroich), Grevenbroich, Rhein-Kreis Neuss, North Rhine-Westphalia
- Altes Gronauer Schloss, Krofdorf-Gleiberg, county of Gießen, Hesse
- Altes Schloss (Hahn), Hahn, county of Saarlouis, Saarland
- Homboll Castle (Altes Schloss), Hilzingen, county of Konstanz, Baden-Württemberg
- Hohenbaden Palace (Altes Schloss), Baden-Baden, Baden-Württemberg
- Altes Schloss (Ingolstadt), Ingolstadt, Bavaria
- Jagsthausen Castle (Altes Schloss), Jagsthausen, county of Heilbronn, Baden-Württemberg
- Altes Schloss (Kißlegg), Kißlegg, county of Ravensburg, Baden-Württemberg
- Altes Schloss (Markvippach), Markvippach, county of Sömmerda, Thuringia
- Altes Schloss (Neckarbischofsheim), Neckarbischofsheim, Rhein-Neckar-Kreis, Baden-Württemberg
- Altes Schloss (Oberzaunsbach), Pretzfeld, county of Forchheim, Bavaria
- Altes Schloss (Pappenheim), Pappenheim, county of Weißenburg-Gunzenhausen, Bavaria
- Altes Schloss (Scheiden), Scheiden, county of Merzig-Wadern, Saarland
- Altes Schloss (Schleißheim), in the castle complex of Schleißheim in Oberschleißheim, county of Munich, Bavaria
- Altes Schloss (Schwarzenfeld), county of Schwandorf, Bavaria
- Altes Schloss (Stuttgart), Stuttgart, Baden-Württemberg
- Altes Schloss (Tettnang), Tettnang, Bodenseekreis, Baden-Württemberg
- Altes Schloss (Valley), Valley, county of Miesbach, Bavaria
- Altes Schloss (Wallerstein), Wallerstein Bavaria

== Other countries ==
- Altes Schloss (Laxenburg) (in the water castle of Laxenburg), Laxenburg, district of Mödling, Niederösterreich, Österreich
- Altes Schloss (Banská Štiavnica), Banská Štiavnica (Schemnitz), Banskobystrický kraj, Slovakia
- Altes Schloss (Bümpliz), Bern-Bümpliz, Berne canton, Switzerland
- Himlštejn Castle, Stráž nad Ohří (Warta an der Eger), Karlovarský kraj, the Czech Republic

== See also ==
- Alte Burg (disambiguation)
