= Lange Meile =

Plateau in the Franconian Jura, Germany

- Auf der Langen Meile
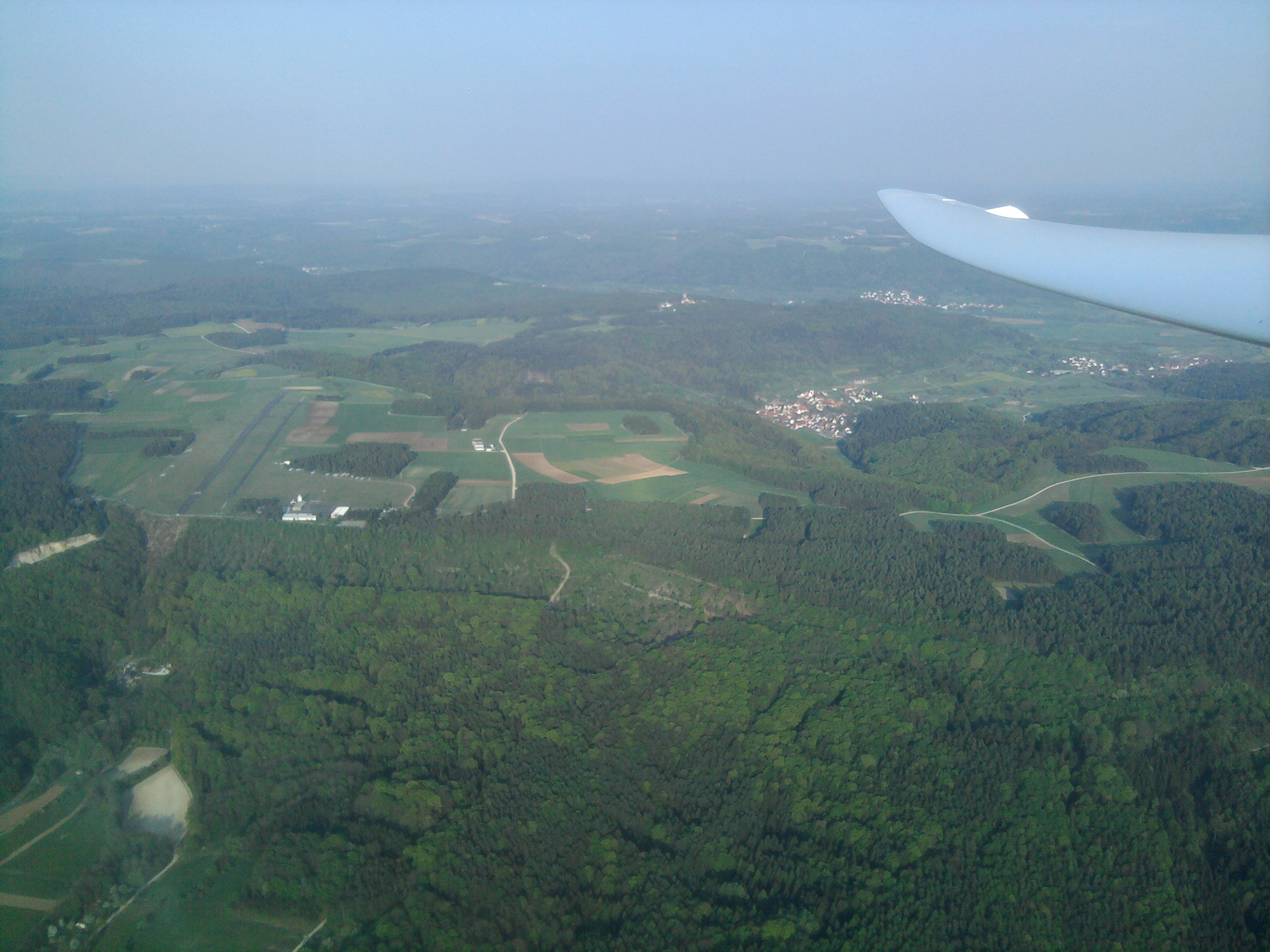
- Aerial photograph of the Lange Meile and Feuerstein Castle Airfield from the west

Highest point
- Elevation: 517 m above sea level (NHN) (1,696 ft)
- Coordinates: 49°47′53″N 11°07′57″E

Geography
- Location within Bavaria
- Location: Forchheim, Upper Franconia, Bavaria, Germany
- Parent range: Franconian Jura

Geology
- Mountain type: plateau

The Lange Meile ("Long Mile") is a plateau (hence the name Auf der Langen Meile - "On the Long Mile" - is often used) in the Franconian Jura in south Germany which is up to about 517 m above sea level (NHN). It lies within the region of Franconian Switzerland in the Upper Franconian county of Forchheim in the state of Bavaria.

== Location ==
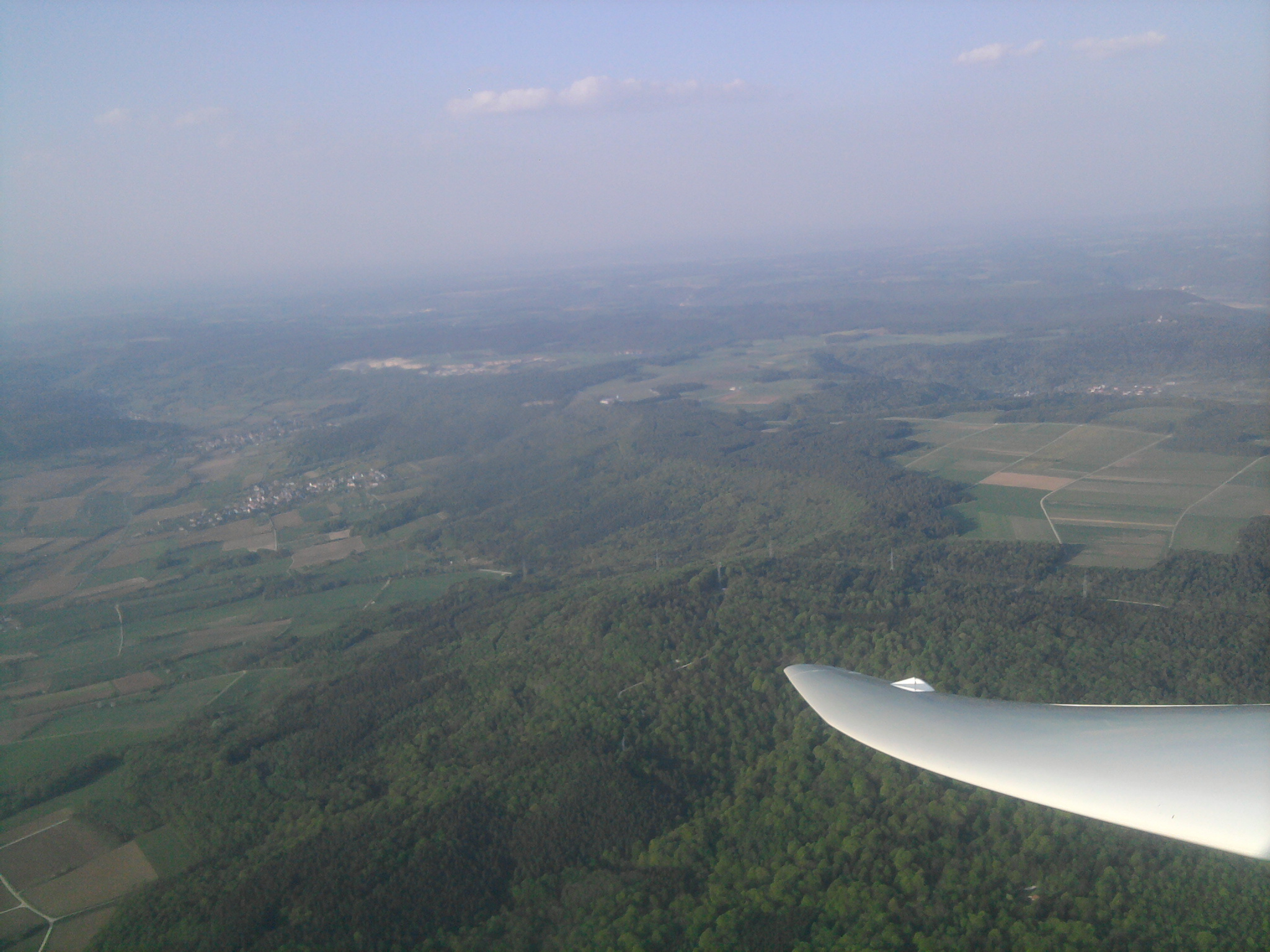
Aerial photograph of the Long Mile from the SW

The Lange Meile is located on the western fringes of the Franconian Jura in the Franconian Switzerland-Veldenstein Forest Nature Park. Its plateau lies between the four towns of Heiligenstadt (Bamberg county) to the north-northeast, Ebermannstadt to the east, Forchheim to the south-southeast and Eggolsheim to the west. Nearby villages include Eschlipp to the north-northeast, Niedermirsberg, Breitenbach, Neuses-Poxstall, Reifenberg and Weilersbach to the east, Ehrlersheim and Rettern to the south, Kauernhofen, Weigelshofen, Drosendorf, Götzendorf to the west and Drügendorf to the north-northwest.

On the northern edge of the Lange Meile, on its boundary with the main plateau of the Franconia Jura between Eschlipp and Drügendorf are limestone quarries. Here the Staatsstraße 2260 from Ebermannstadt runs past Eschlipp between the quarries to Drügendorf. To the east the plateau descends into the valley of the Wiesent, a tributary of the Regnitz and, to the west, into that of the Eggerbach, a short tributary of the Main-Danube Canal.

== High points ==
Among the high points on the Lange Meile, which are only gentle hill summits or eminences, are the following (with heights in metres (m) above sea level (NHN):

- Schützenberg (517 m), northeast of Rettern
- Wachknock (517 m), between Niedermirsberg and Breitenbach
- Mirsberger Höhe (514.5 m), northwest of Niedermirsberg
- Rotenberg (510 m), east-northeast of Kauernhofen
- Retterner Kanzel (506.3 m), east of Rettern
- Steinberg (506 m), north of Reifenberg
- Högelstein (497.9 m), between Kauernhofen and Rettern
- Schloßberg (493.1 m), northeast of Drosendorf

== Geology ==
The rocks of the Lange Meile were formed by the Jurassic Sea and consist of clay, sandstone and limestone. Sediments of the Malm characterise the plateau. Its source waters are used to supply drinking water to several nearby villages. It has a high lime content.

== Reserves ==
On the eastern flanks of the Lange Meile is one of the western areas of the Special Area of Conservation called Wiesent Valley and Side Valleys (Wiesent-Tal mit Seitentälern, FFH No. 6233-371), the western flank of this table-like hill is part of the southern area of the SAC known as the Albtrauf from the Frisener Warte to the Lange Meile (Albtrauf von der Friesener Warte zur Langen Meile, FFH No. 6132-371). Large parts of the Lange Meile lie in the western part of the Franconian Switzerland-Veldenstein Forest protected area, established in 2001 founded and covering an area of 1,021.64 square kilometres (LSG No. 322697).

== Landscape and sights ==
The steep sides of the Lange Meile are forested, the plateau itself is bare in many areas and is used for agriculture.

On the Lange Meile are Feuerstein Castle Airfield south of the Mirsberg Heights (Mirsberger Höhe) and, south of that, the Feuerstein Observatory. On the Wachknock, to the east, is the youth hostel of Feuerstein Castle.
