= Altes Schloss (Drügendorf) =

Ringwall Altes Schloss
- Eggolsheim-Drügendorf-"Schlossberg"

Site information
- Type: ringfort, spur location
- Code: DE-BY
- Condition: burgstall, ringfort with outer ditch in places

Location
- Location within Germany
- Coordinates: 49°47′58″N 11°07′21″E
- Height: 493.4 m above sea level (NN)

Site history
- Built: Early medieval

The small ringwork of the Altes Schloss ("old castle") is all that remains of a, now levelled, early medieval fortification on one of the projecting hill spurs of the Mirsberg Heights (Mirsberger Höhe) on the Lange Meile in the valley of the Eggerbach. The spur is called the Schlossberg ("castle hill"). The old castle site lies at a height of 493.4 m above sea level (NN) around 935 metres south-southeast of the Roman Catholic parish church of St. Margareta of Drügendorf in the Upper Franconian municipality of Eggolsheim in Bavaria, Germany. No historical or archaeological information about this hillfort exists, and there have been no finds that might be able to be used to date the site. Based on the design of the fortification it has been tentatively dated to the Carolingian-Ottonian period. All that has survived is a ringwork with an outer ditch in places. The fortification is protected today as heritage site number D-4-6132-0125: "Early Medieval Ringwork" (Frühmittelalterliche Ringwallanlage).

== Description ==
The ringwork is situated on westward pointing hill spur that lies about 180 metres above the valley floor. The oval interior of the fortification, which measures 55 by 35 metres, is enclosed on all sides by a circular rampart. On the steeply falling western and northwestern sides it runs in the shape of an arc. On the eastern and southern sides it is constructed as a sector rampart with three sections. On the eastern side the rampart is still about two metres high and ten metres wide. Inside the circular rampart the remains of a dry stone wall have survived. In front of the gently ascending eastern side a moat was dug as an additional obstacle. The moat peters out at its northern and southern ends at the edges of the hilltop. The old access was on the southwest side of the site; here there is a gap in rampart a few metres wide.

== Literature ==
- Rainer Hofmann (rev.): Führer zu archäologischen Denkmälern in Deutschland, Band 20: Fränkische Schweiz. Konrad Theiss Verlag, Stuttgart, 1990, ISBN 3-8062-0586-8, pp. 153–154.
- Björn-Uwe Abels: Führer zu archäologischen Denkmälern in Bayern, Franken Band 2: Archäologischer Führer Oberfranken. Konrad Theiss Verlag, Stuttgart, 1986, ISBN 3-8062-0373-3, pp. 127 and 128.
- Klaus Schwarz: Die vor- und frühgeschichtlichen Geländedenkmäler Oberfrankens. (Materialhefte zur bayerischen Vorgeschichte, Series B, Vol. 5). Verlag Michael Lassleben, Kallmünz, 1955, p. 73.
