= Tiefenstürmig (fortification) =

- Eggolsheim-Tiefenstürmig-Flur "Heiligkreuzholz"

Site information
- Type: Wallburg
- Code: DE-BY
- Condition: burgstall (no above-ground ruins)

Location
- Location within Germany
- Coordinates: 49°49′47″N 11°07′35″E
- Height: 517 m above sea level (NHN)

Site history
- Built: Prehistorical, possibly medieval

The field fortification of Tiefenstürmig (German: Abschnittsbefestigung Tiefenstürmig) is a levelled, probably prehistorical, sector fortification at a height of 517 m above sea level (NHN) in the area known as Heiligkreuzholz about 600 metres east of the village centre of Tiefenstürmig, in the market municipality of Eggolsheim in the county of Forchheim in the south German state of Bavaria.

Nothing has survived of the circular rampart site and there is no visible evidence of a medieval ground level residence.

== Literature ==
- Denis André Chevalley (revision editor) (1986). "Oberfranken". In Michael Petzet, Bayerisches Landesamt für Denkmalpflege [in German] (ed.). Denkmäler in Bayern : Ensembles, Baudenkmäler, archäologische Geländedenkmäler [Monuments in Bavaria: ensembles, monuments, archaeological site memorials]. Denkmäler in Bayern (in German). Vol. IV (Various ed.). München: Oldenbourg. p. 187. ISBN 3-486-52395-3.
- Klaus Schwarz: Die vor- und frühgeschichtlichen Geländedenkmäler Oberfrankens. (Materialhefte zur bayerischen Vorgeschichte, Series B, Vol. 5). Verlag Michael Laßleben, Kallmünz, 1955, p. 84.
