= Schießberg Ringwork =

- Eggolsheim-Unterstürmig-"Schießberg"

Site information
- Type: hill castle, hillfort
- Code: DE-BY
- Condition: burgstall, ditch and ramparts

Location
- Location within Germany
- Coordinates: 49°47′36″N 11°03′43″E
- Height: 422 m above sea level (NHN)

Site history
- Built: Early Middle Ages

The ringwork on the Schießberg (German: Ringwall Schießberg) is a, now levelled, early medieval hillfort situated at a height of 422 m above sea level (NHN) on the Schießberg, about 1,100 metres northeast of the church of Unterstürmig, a village in the market municipality of Eggolsheim in the county of Forchheim in the south German state of Bavaria.

Of the former castle, only circular ramparts and moat remnants have survived.

== Literature ==
- Hansjürgen Brachmann: Der frühmittelalterliche Befestigungsbau in Mitteleuropa. Untersuchungen zu seiner Entwicklung und Funktion im germanisch-deutschen Bereich. In: Schriften zur Ur- und Frühgeschichte. 45. Akademie Verlag, Berlin, 1993, ISBN 3-05-001995-6.
- Björn-Uwe Abels: Führer zu archäologischen Denkmälern in Bayern, Franken Band 2: Archäologischer Führer Oberfranken. Konrad Theiss Verlag, Stuttgart, 1986, ISBN 3-8062-0373-3, pp. 127–129.
- Klaus Schwarz: Die vor- und frühgeschichtlichen Geländedenkmäler Oberfrankens. (Materialhefte zur bayerischen Vorgeschichte, Series B, Vol. 5). Verlag Michael Laßleben, Kallmünz, 1955, p. 60.
