= Bümpliz-Oberbottigen =

District of Bern, Switzerland

Coordinates: 46.94265°N 7.36175°E

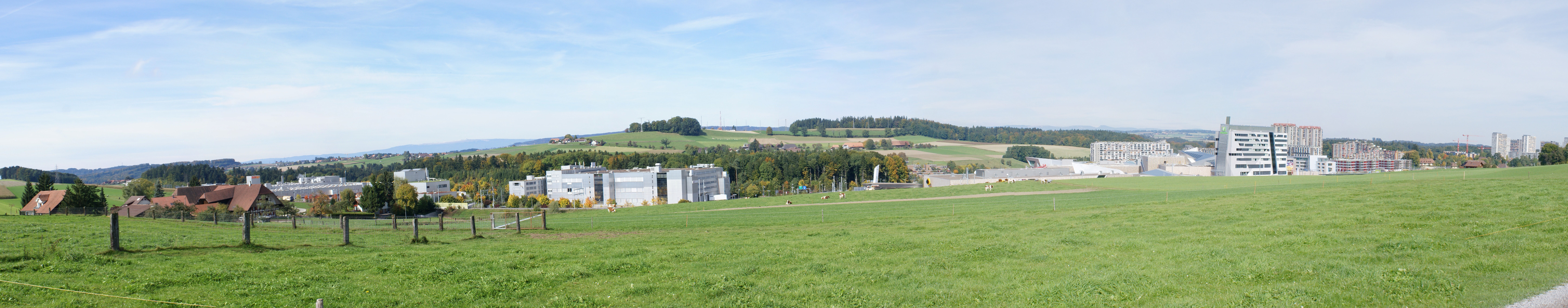
The northern part of the district with the hamlet of Niederbottigen, the Westside shopping mall and the Gäbelbach, Stöckacker and Tscharnergut tower blocks.

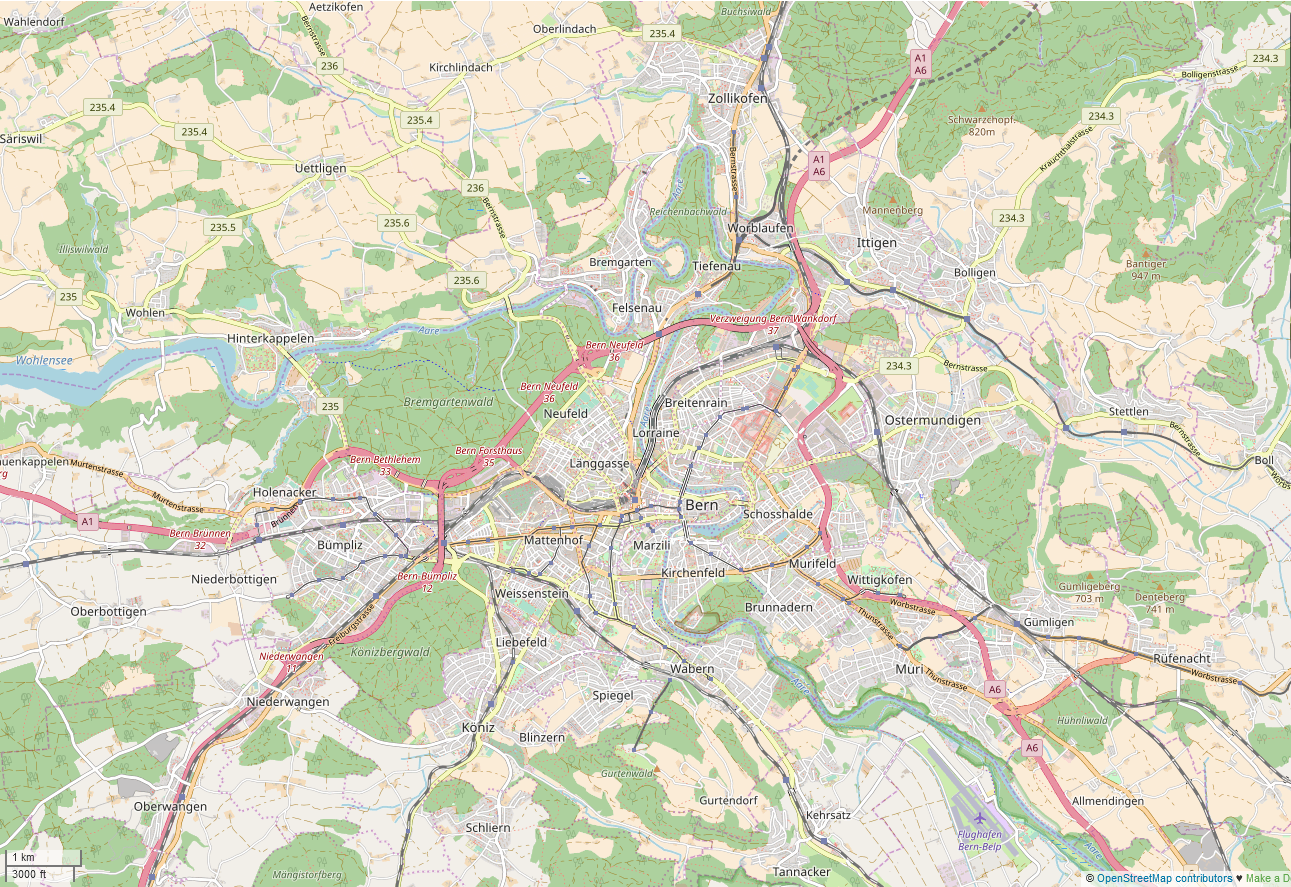
Bümpliz-Oberbottigen location near Bern

Bümpliz-Oberbottigen is a Stadtteil (district) of the city of Bern, Switzerland. It is situated to the west of the city center and consists of the Quartiere (quarters) Bümpliz, Oberbottigen, Stöckacker, Bethlehem and Brünnen.

As the most recently developed district of Bern, Bümpliz-Oberbottigen is an amalgamation of Bümpliz, a formerly independent suburban municipality, with rural hamlets such as Oberbottigen and Riedbach and modern highrise housing developments. The tower blocks of Gäbelbach, Tscharnergut and Stöckacker, a heritage from the 1960s and 70s, are a prominent part of Bethlehem's cityscape. The most recent quarter, Brünnen, was formally established in September 2008 as part of an ongoing major urban development programme.

== Statistics ==
In 2006, the district had 31,343 inhabitants, 30% of which were foreigners, mostly South Eastern European nationals. This constitutes more than a third of Bern's entire foreign population. The apartment rents are the city's lowest, and 8.8% of the population received social welfare benefits in 2006, as compared to 4.6% in the city as a whole.

With a surface area of 2,023 hectares, the district is the city's largest. It is a bedroom community, home to 25% of the city's population but only the location of 9% of the city's workplaces.

== History ==
The area of Bümpliz has been a center of habitation since about the 5th century BC, as indicated by the presence of La Tène and Völkerwanderung burial grounds, as well as the remains of an extensive 1st century Roman villa at the site of today's St. Maurce church. In medieval times and under the Ancien Régime, the dominion of Bümpliz – recorded as Pimpenymgis in 1016 and Bimplitz in 1235 – changed hands from the Empire to the lords of Bern and then numerous times among the patrician families of Bern, who built several palatial residences in Bümpliz.

The municipality of Bümpliz, founded 1798 in the course of the Napoleonic reforms, experienced a swift growth as a suburb of Bern after the 1860s. Financial difficulties forced it to agree to a merger with Bern in 1919. The new district continued to grow, in particular after 1945 with the construction of large-scale housing developments and satellite towns (Tscharnergut 1958–67, Schwabgut 1965–71, Fellergut 1961–64, Gäbelbach 1965–68 and Kleefeld 1968–72).

Ambitious plans to build a high-rise satellite city for 150,000 inhabitants had to be shelved due to the recession brought about by the 1973 oil crisis, and another plan failed in the 1990s due to the collapse of a bubble in the housing market. A much reduced development plan for the new Brünnen quarter was approved in a 1999 referendum. After lengthy court disputes, construction of the residential buildings and of the Westside shopping and leisure complex designed by Daniel Libeskind commenced in 2005. The area is planned to be fully developed in 2018.

== Buildings of note ==
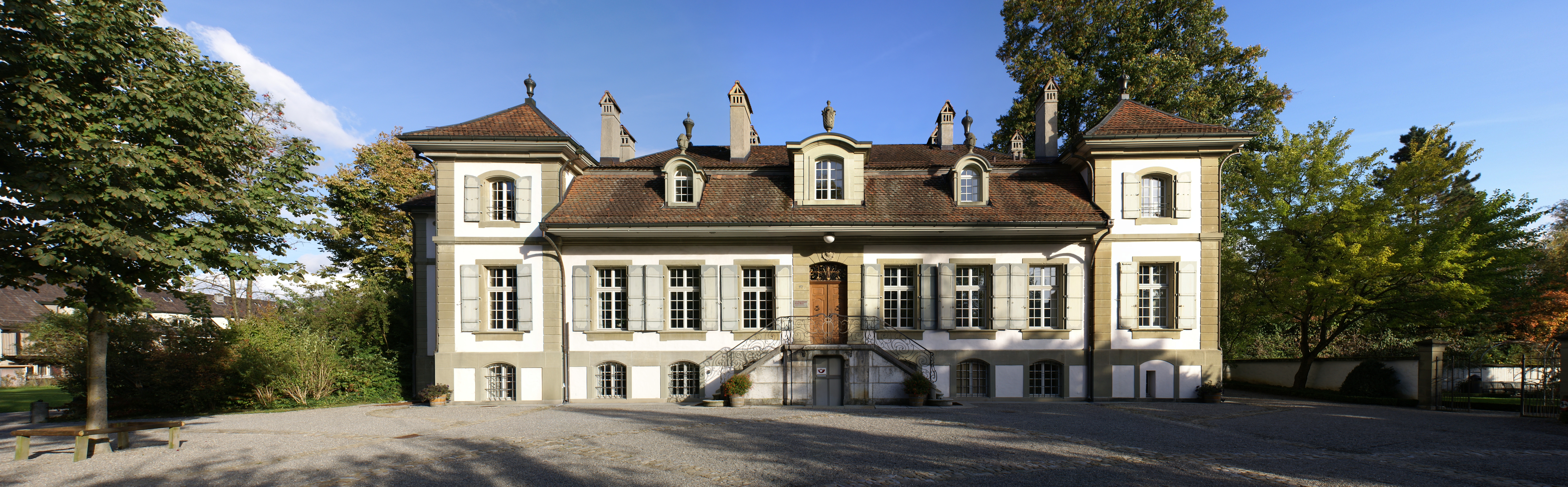
The New Palace of Bümpliz.

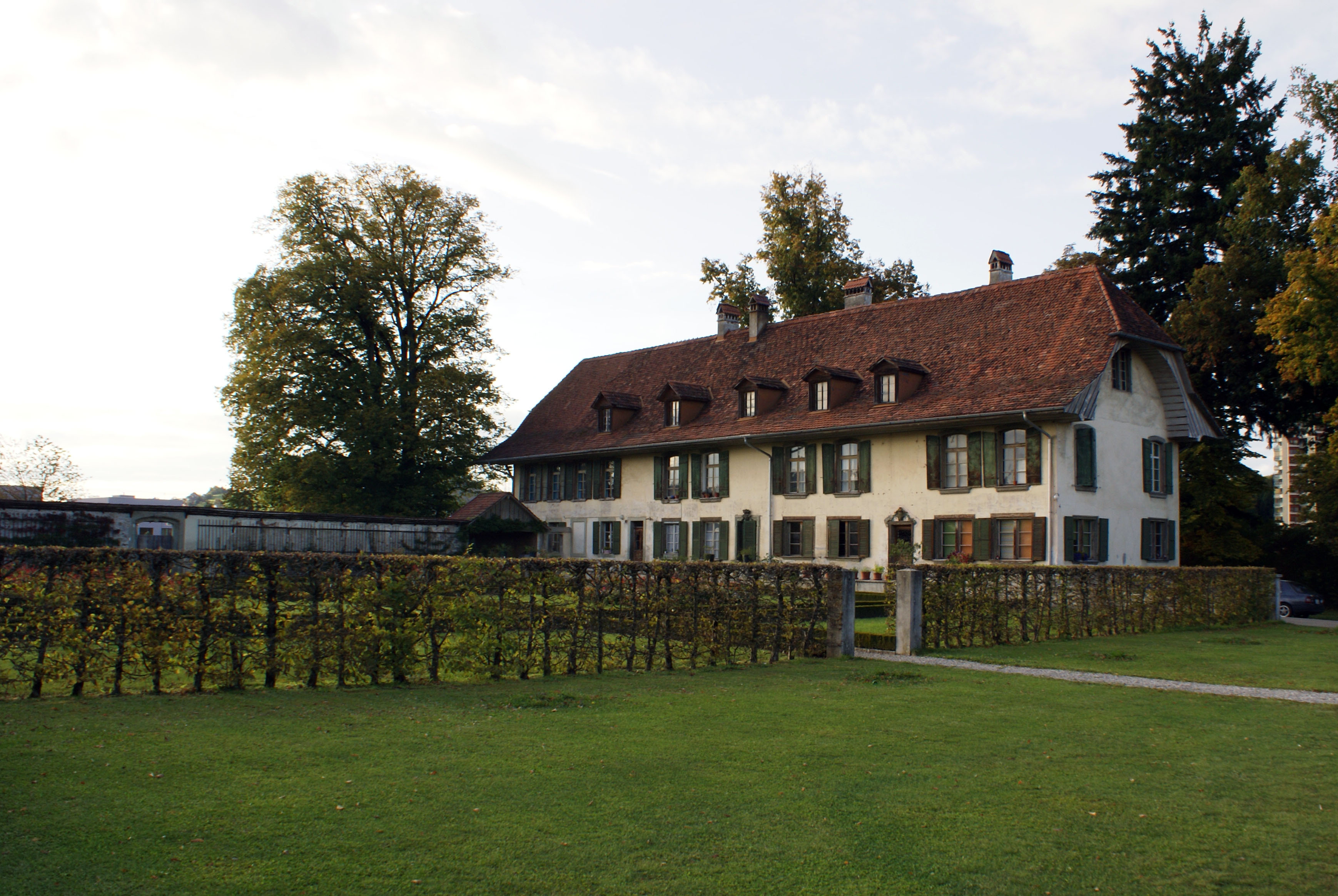
The Brünnen country estate.

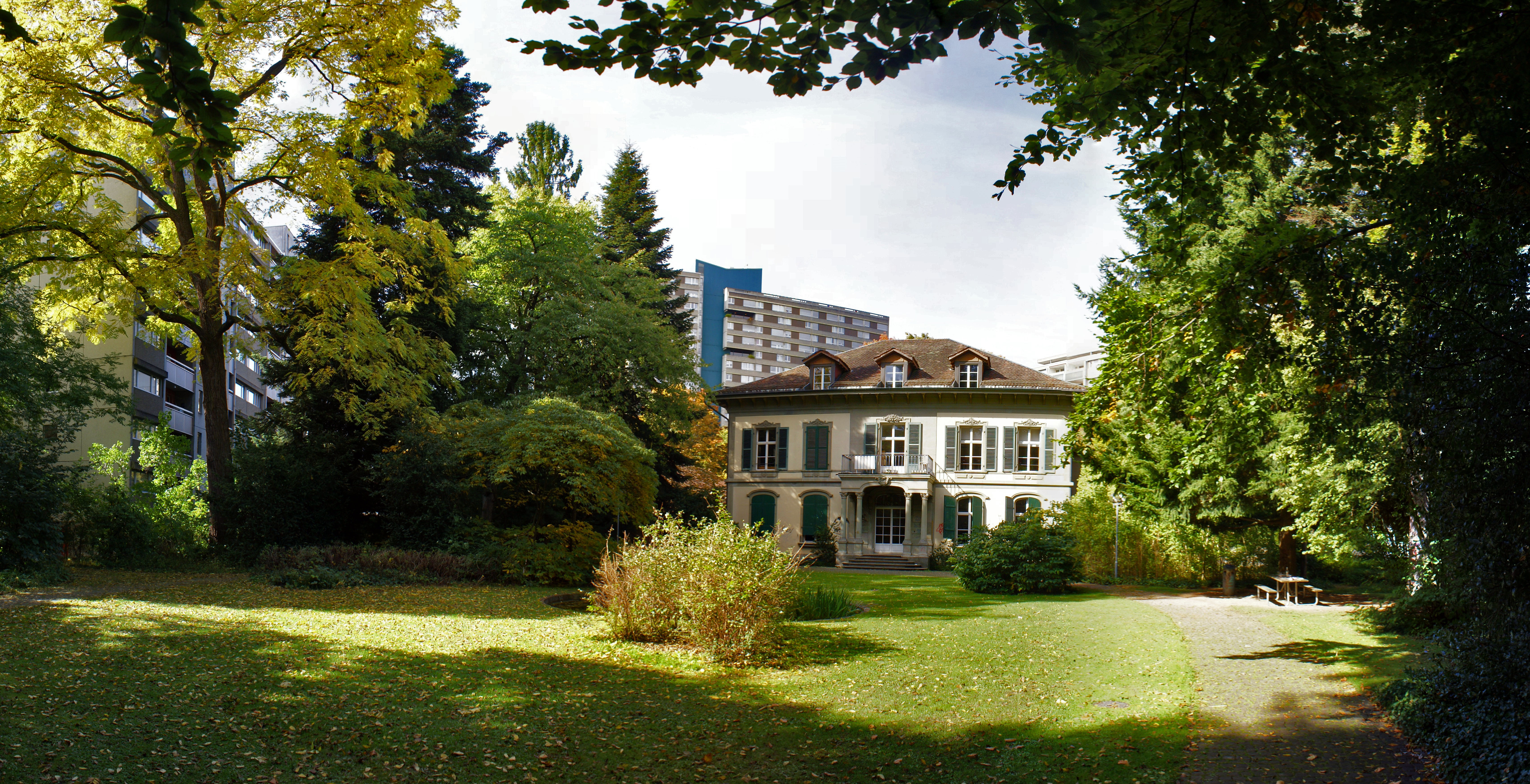
The Feller estate in Bümpliz.

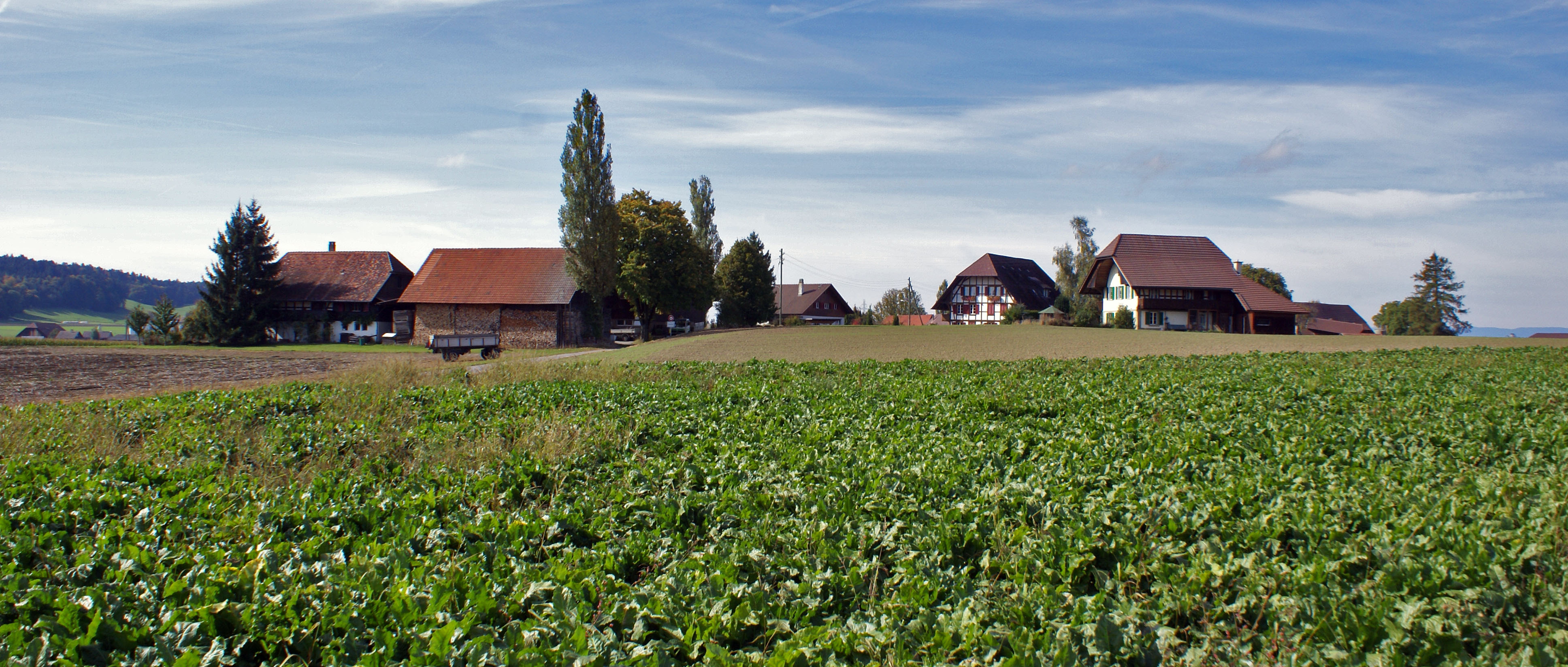
Niederbottigen, a hamlet just west of Bümpliz.

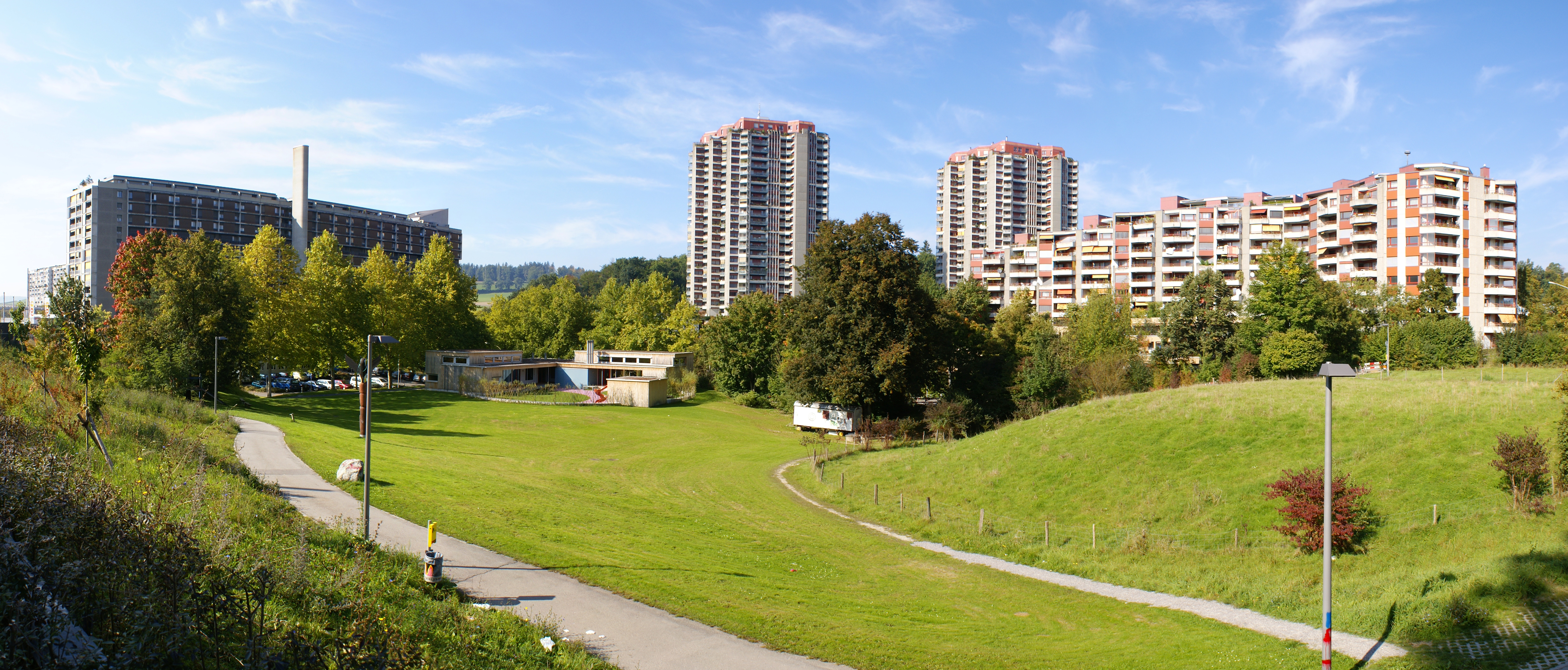
The Gäbelbach (left) and Holenacker (center-right) housing developments.

The Altes Schloss (Old Palace) of Bümpliz on Bümplizstrasse 91 is built on the site of a 10th-century Upper Burgundian royal court. A round tower, whose fundaments are visible in the cellar, was built by Peter II of Savoy in the 1260s. The current palace was built after 1488 by Rudolf von Erlach in the late medieval Romantic style and was partially adapted to the tastes of the Baroque by Franz Ludwig von Erlach in 1632. The moat was filled and the palace partially demolished in 1742; a modern extension was added in 1979-80.

Very close to the Old Palace, the Neues Schloss (New Palace) – a singular work in Bernese architectural history – was built in 1742 by Albrecht Türler for Daniel Tschiffeli. It housed a boys' school in the 19th century and is now the civil registry office of Bern; all civil marriages in the city are officiated in the palace's richly decorated great salon.

The reformed church of Bümpliz, formerly a Roman Catholic church dedicated to St. Maurice, was rebuilt in 1666 after a fire by Abraham Dünz. It received extensions by Karl Indermühle in 1915 and 1924 as well as by Karl Indermühle in 1952. Also in Bümpliz, the Feller country estate, a 1730 construction, was reshaped in the Classicist style in the 19th century, and is now embedded in the Fellergut highrise housing development. In Brünnen, the former lord's estate, a 1648 construction with 1765 extension by Niklaus Sprüngli, features painted wood carvings that are among Bern's best architectural sculptures from the Louis XV period.

In the rural landscape west of Bümpliz many significant works of traditional Bernese countryside architecture remain. The hamlet of Niederbottigen is among the best-preserved such settlements, including among others the Hochstudhaus, a 1675 farmhouse displaying exceptionally fine craftsmanship, and the Hans-Franz-Nägeli-Haus, a 17th-century High Baroque country estate in the center of the settlement.

One of the area's first modern housing developments, the Morgenstrasse-Siedlung of 1943-44 in Bümpliz by Hermann Rüfenacht, is a testament to the Heimatstil-influenced wartime modern style in Switzerland. The Stapfenacker school, built 1930-31 by Karl Indermühle, is one of Switzerland's first schools in the Neues Bauen style.

The Tscharnergut tower blocks, built in Bethlehem in 1958-65 as a car-free satellite town for 5,000 inhabitants, were among the country's first highrise housing developments. In 1965-68, they were complemented by the Gäbelbach development, Bern's most architecturally prominent work of large-scale housebuilding. It consists of three immense tower blocks inspired by Le Corbusier's Unités d'Habitation linked by an axis of community buildings. Just south of Gäbelbach, the long-empty Brünnen field is currently being developed into an upmarket residential area. The new quarter's commercial and architectural centerpiece – the Westside complex by Daniel Libeskind – was opened to the public on 8 October 2008.
