= Oberweilersbach Castle =

Mediaeval lowland castle in Germany

- Weilersbach-Oberweilersbach

Site information
- Type: lowland castle
- Code: DE-BY
- Condition: burgstall (no above-ground ruins)

Location
- Coordinates: 49°45′11″N 11°07′27″E
- Height: 340 m above sea level (NHN)

Site history
- Built: recorded in the 12th century

Oberweilersbach Castle (German: Burgstall Oberweilersbach) is a levelled mediaeval lowland castle in the northwest of the parish of Oberweilersbach, in the municipality of Weilersbach in the county of Forchheim in the south German state of Bavaria.

Nothing of the castle, which was mentioned in the records in the 12th century, has survived.

== Literature ==
- Hellmut Kunstmann: Die Burgen der südwestlichen Fränkischen Schweiz. Aus der Reihe: Veröffentlichungen der Gesellschaft für Fränkische Geschichte Reihe IX: Darstellungen aus der Fränkischen Geschichte, Vol. 28. Kommissionsverlag Degener und Co., Neustadt/Aisch, 1990, pp. 136–153.
- Denis André Chevalley; Michael Petzet [in German], eds. (1986). "Oberfranken". Denkmäler in Bayern: Ensembles, Baudenkmäler, archäologische Geländedenkmäler [Monuments in Bavaria: ensembles, monuments, archaeological site memorials]. Denkmäler in Bayern (in German). Vol. IV (Various ed.). München: Oldenbourg. ISBN 3-486-52395-3.
