= Neues Schloss Bümpliz =

Castle in Bümpliz, Bern, Switzerland

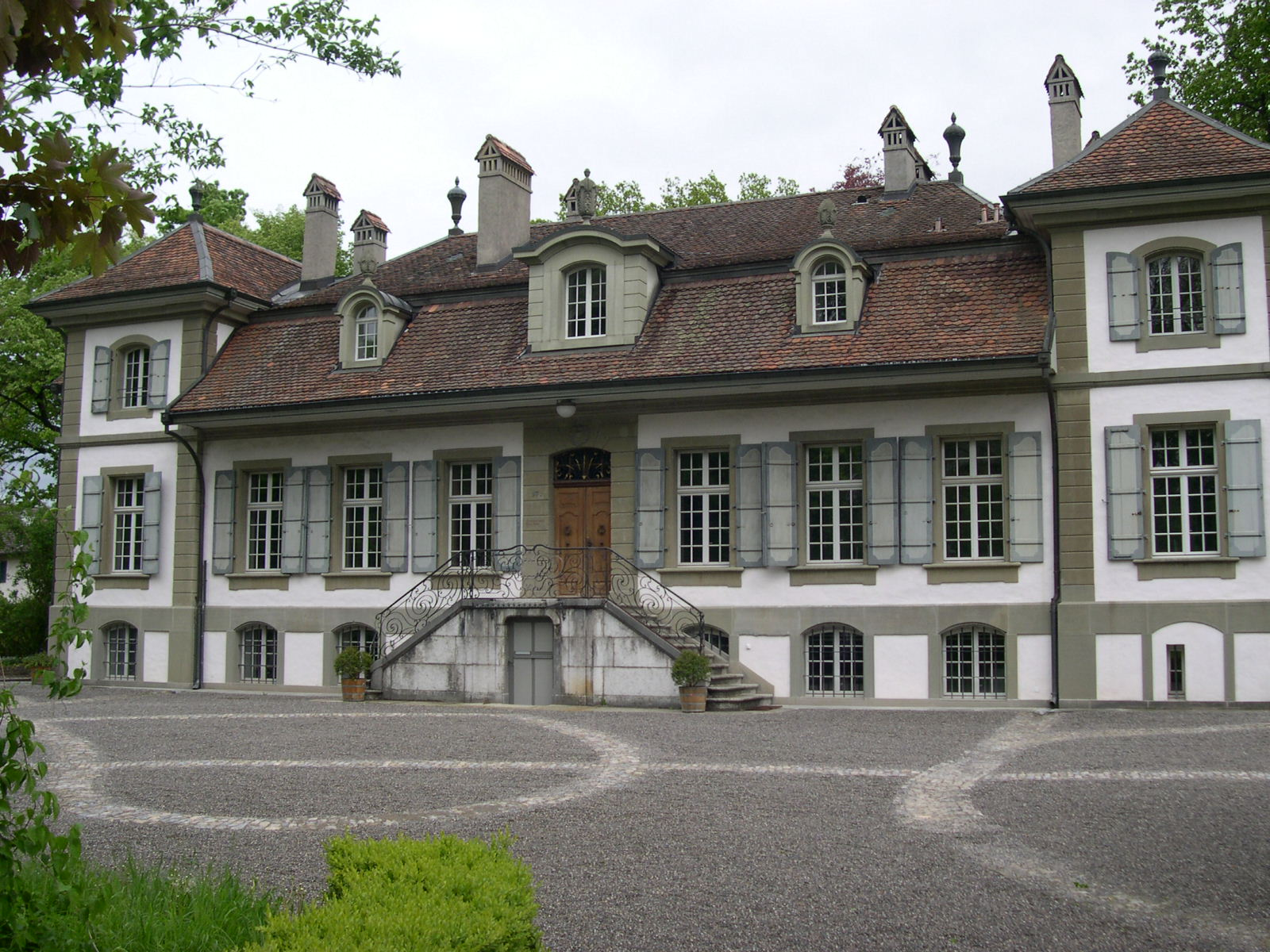
- Bümpliz and surroundings

- Location within Switzerland

General information
- Location: Bümpliz
- Coordinates: 46°56′36″N 7°23′31″E
- Completed: 1742

The Neues Schloss Bümpliz (English: New Bümpliz Castle) is a castle in the section of Bümpliz-Oberbottigen in the city of Bern of the canton of Bern in Switzerland. It is located directly across from the Altes Schloss Bümpliz.

== History ==
By the 18th century, the Old Castle had become increasingly old fashioned and uncomfortable. In 1742, Daniel Tschiffely hired Albrecht Stürler to replace the old building with a new castle. The new building was built surrounded by parks and gardens southwest of what would come to be known as the Old Castle.

In 1839 Johann Friedrich Albrecht Tribolet bought the Old and New Castles from Carl von Tavel. He rebuilt the buildings and used them as a private sanatorium for mental patients. Tribolet would later become the director of the psychiatric Klinik Waldau. Between 1839 and 1849 the calm patients were housed in the New Castle, while the violent or noisy lived in the Old. In 1849 the buildings were acquired by Jakob Allemann who converted it into a boys' boarding school, which was known as the Löffelschlyffi. The school remained in operation until the depression of 1882, when the last director of the school, Jakob Enz-Allemann, had to sell the castles. Two years later, his widow, Emilie Enz-Allemann, was able to reacquire both castles. She sold the New Castle but retained the Old, which she converted into a rental property.

After passing through a number of owners, in 1977 it was purchased by the city of Bern. In 2005, the castle became the administrative offices for the administrative District of Bern. However, in 2010, the Canton reorganized and the 23 districts were consolidated into 10 larger districts. The newly created Bern-Mittelland district required more space than the Castle could provide. The castle is now used for special ceremonies and weddings.

== See also ==
- List of castles in Switzerland
