= Altes Schloss Bümpliz =

Castle in Bern, Switzerland

- Bümpliz-Oberbottigen
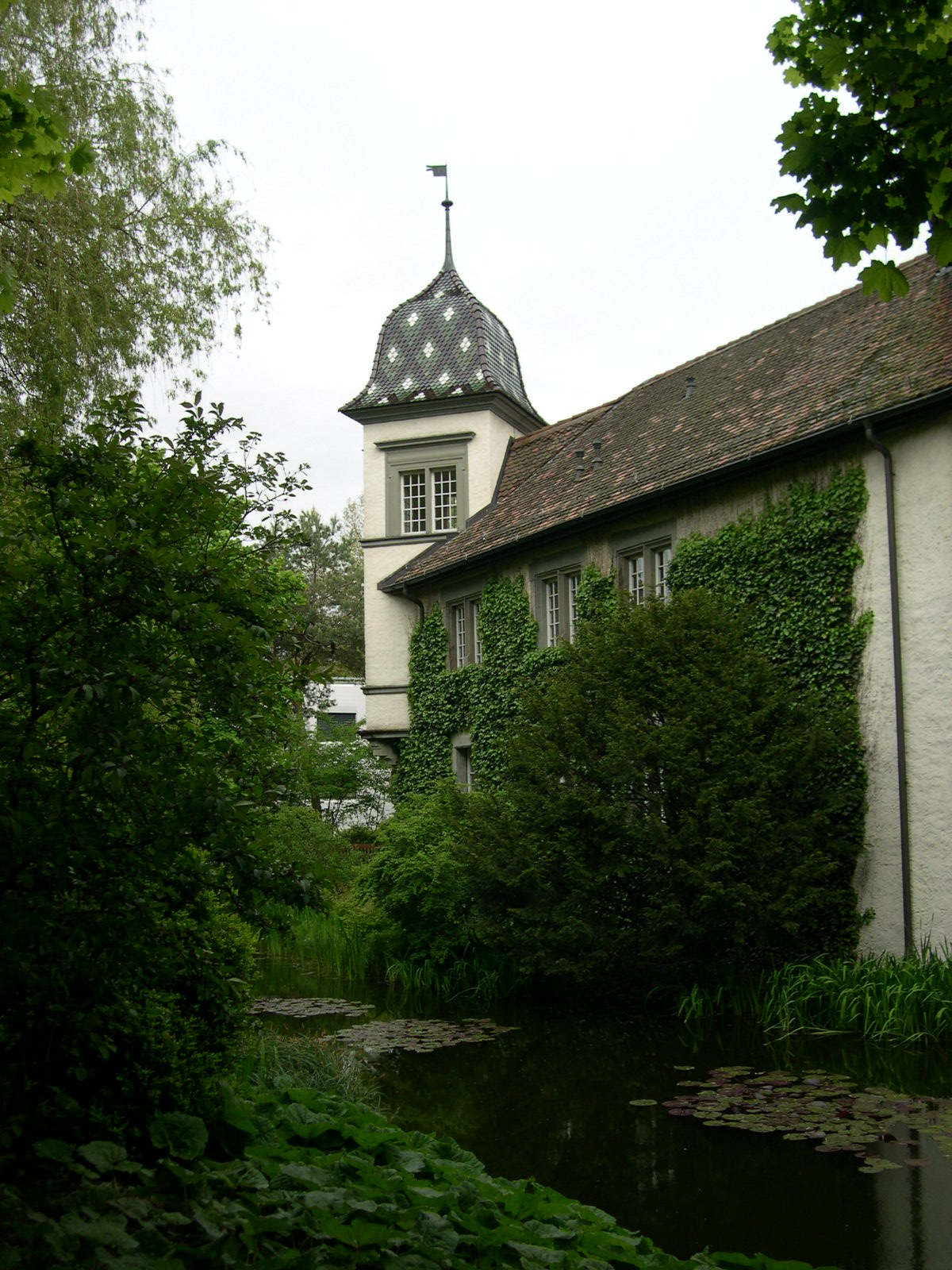
- Altes Schloss Bümpliz Castle

Site information
- Open to the public: yes
- Condition: converted into restaurant

Location
- Coordinates: 46.94416°N 7.39196°E

The Altes Schloss Bümpliz (English: Old Bümpliz Castle) is a castle in the section of Bümpliz-Oberbottigen in the city of Bern of the canton of Bern in Switzerland.

== History ==
The first structure on the site was a Burgundian royal estate which was built around 900. The estate is first mentioned by the Burgundian King Rudolf III around 1010, but he lists his father as the builder of the estate. Very little is known about this first castle, except that it consisted of a circular wooden wall with several wooden buildings inside the wall. Around 1260 or between 1250 and 1270 a round stone tower was built in the center of the site. This round tower was quite unusual for Bernese castles but may indicate a savoyard influence. Since Peter II of Savoy held authority over Bern at the time, it is likely, but not confirmed, that the round tower was built as a symbol of Savoy's power. The tower had an outer diameter of 9.3 m (31 ft) and a thickness of about 2 m (6.6 ft). It probably rose about 10–15 m (33–49 ft) high. The round tower no longer exists, but its location is marked with a cross on the floor of the current restaurant terrace. Shortly after the construction of the tower, the wooden wall was replaced with a stone wall and a half-round tower was added to protect the wall. The round central tower was demolished in the following decades. The growing Bernese power began to force Savoy out of Bümpliz and by the late 13th century, there were Bernese nobles who were naming themselves after their estates in Bümpliz. Under the Bernese nobles, the castle remained unchanged until 1470.

In 1470 Bümpliz village and the castle became part of the lands of the powerful Bernese patrician Erlach family. The castle was rebuilt from a purely defensive structure into an impressive administrative and residential castle. A new gatehouse tower was built, and stands, almost unchanged, today. The gatehouse tower was square and about 8.4 m (28 ft) on each side. It is 10 m (33 ft) high to the eaves, with an additional 7 m (23 ft) to the peak of the roof. The supports and structure of the drawbridge over the moat are still visible today. The gatehouse faces west. Next to the gatehouse, the south-west wall was raised and a block of rooms were added on the inside. Between the gatehouse and the south-west wing, a half-round tower, the Abortturm was built. The Abortturm, which no longer exists, contained bathrooms for the first and second floors as well as stairs into the roof over the gatehouse. Around the same time, the old half-round tower in the north-east and the eastern housing tract were expanded. The north-west housing tract, which flanks the gatehouse, was built later, around 1630.

In the following century, the Old Castle became increasingly old fashioned and uncomfortable. In 1742, Daniel Tschiffely hired Albrecht Stürler to replace the old building with the Neues Schloss Bümpliz. The New Castle was built surrounded by parks and gardens southwest of the Old Castle. During construction, much of the Old Castle was pulled down or rebuilt. The old half-round tower, the south-west and south-east housing tracts and the Abortturm were all demolished. The moat was drained and filled in. The gate in the gatehouse tower was bricked up and the road was rerouted around the tower. Portions of the north-west wing remained. The north-east wing was rebuilt into a barn and the courtyard was converted into a vegetable garden and chicken coops.

In 1839 Johann Friedrich Albrecht Tribolet bought the Old and New Castles from Carl von Tavel. He rebuilt the buildings and used them as a private sanatorium for mental patients. Tribolet would later become the director of the psychiatric Klinik Waldau. Between 1839 and 1849 the calm patients were housed in the New Castle, while the violent or noisy lived in the Old. In 1849 the buildings were acquired by Jakob Allemann who converted it into a boys' boarding school, which was known as the Löffelschlyffi. The school remained in operation until the depression of 1882, when the last director of the school, Jakob Enz-Allemann, had to sell the castles. Two years later, his widow, Emilie Enz-Allemann, was able to reacquire both castles. She sold the New Castle but converted the Old into a rental property with three small apartments on the ground floor and two larger ones in the upper story. After her death in 1897, Hermann and Anna Enz inherited the castle.

In 1919, Hermann Enz and his sister Anna Enz sold the castle to the "Gemeinnützige Genossenschaft Altes Schloss Bümpliz", a society that had been founded to preserve and maintain the castle. They rebuilt the interior rooms and during the Great Depression used the castle to provide good, cheap food, a lounge and a library to the many jobless in the area. Later they converted it into an alcohol free restaurant and a kindergarten. In 1925, the castle was wired for electricity.

In 1954 the "Gemeinnützige Genossenschaft" sold the Old Castle for about 80,000 CHF to the city of Bern. An archeological dig in 1966 found such a wealth of artifacts, that in 1970 a team of twelve workers led by Werner Meyer, a professor at the University of Basel, spent ten weeks exploring the castle grounds and discovering the history of the castle. However, above ground the buildings were not maintained, and continued to decay. On 19 November 1976 a fire destroyed the roof of the castle.

In 1979/80 the Castle was rebuilt at a cost of about 3 Million CHF. The gate was reopened in the gatehouse, a portion of the moat was excavated and a drawbridge added. The windows were rebuilt in the baroque style and the burned roof was rebuilt as close to original as possible. The north-west wing was rebuilt, while the north-east wing was recreated in concrete and glass. A restaurant opened in the north-east wing, the gatehouse and the courtyard. The rest of the building was converted into the Bümpliz village archives and into meeting rooms or offices.

== See also ==
- List of castles in Switzerland
