= Westside Shopping and Leisure Centre =

Shopping mall in Bern, Switzerland

Coordinates: 46.945°N 7.374°E

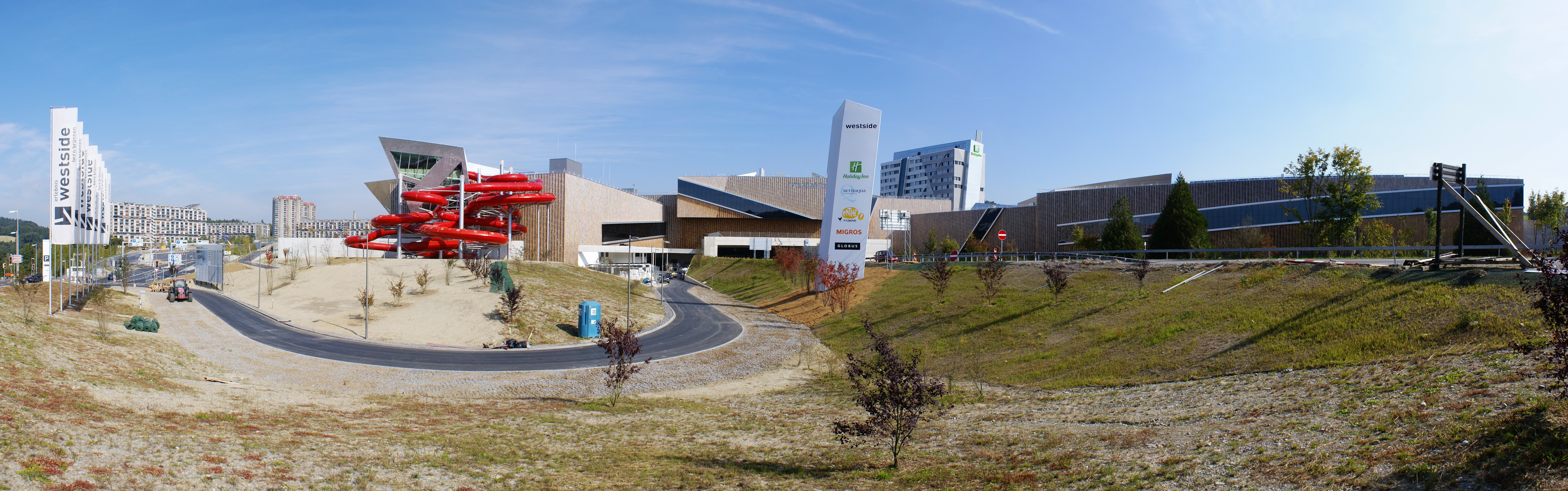
The western facade of Westside.

The Westside Shopping and Leisure Centre, on the outskirts of Bern, Switzerland, is a multi-use facility with shops, restaurants, a swimming pool, conference spaces, residences, a hotel, fitness centres, and a cinema. It was designed by international architect Daniel Libeskind and completed in October 2008.

== Design ==
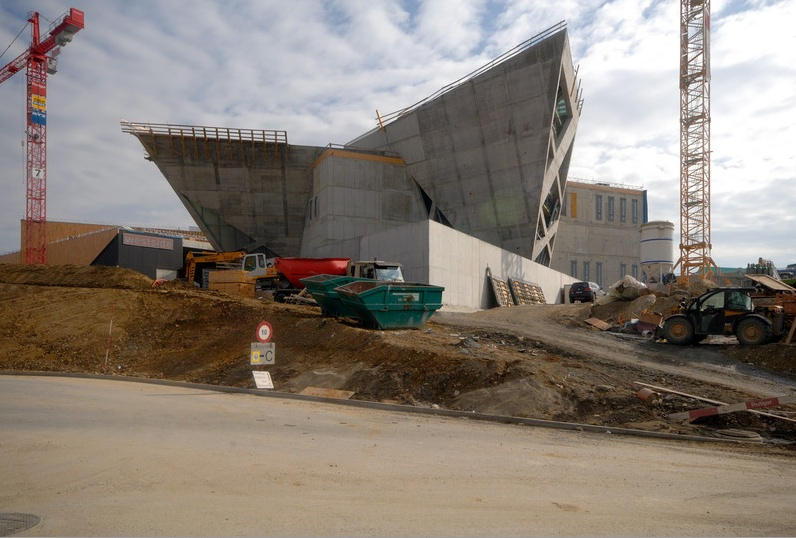
Westside under construction.

Despite its location west of the city, in Brünnen-Bern, Westside is urban in scale. According to Studio Daniel Libeskind's website, the site brings “together the dimensions of commerce, culture and leisure." Positioned over a motorway, the centre overlooks an S-Bahn station and acts as a gateway to Bern. The complex is crystalline in structure; a steel concrete skeleton supports the centre's wood façade.

Cuts in the roof bring the changing daylight into the center's two plazas. One plaza faces the surrounding Brünnen landscape and connects to the centre's bath, while the other plaza adjoins the hotel and cinema.

Windows tumble across the façade, bringing light into the building. This design evokes the erratic matrix of windows across Libeskind's first major international success, the Jewish Museum Berlin.

== Reaction ==
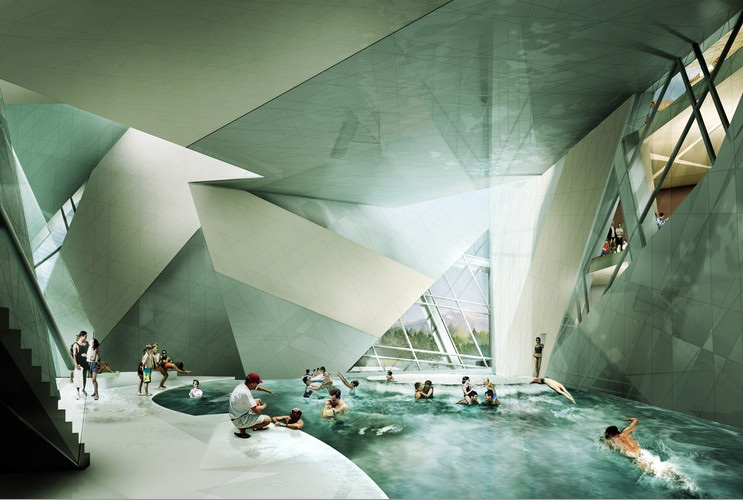
Artist's concept of swimming facility inside the Westside Shopping and Leisure Centre.

Critics, such as David Rogers of the Los Angeles-based Jerde Partnership, have faulted Bern for neglecting to integrate such a shopping centre into the city's urban fabric. A shopping centre on the city's periphery contributes to the disintegration of the city centre and leads to a “loss of values,” he says.

Defenders of Westside, such as Swiss architect Barbara Holzer, argue that Bern's urban centre is not under threat and that the shopping centre instead offers “new urban spaces.” Westside, with its blend of commercial, residential and recreational spaces, exemplifies populist architecture and emphasises public life. Peter Keller, of the Zürich newspaper, Neue Zürcher Zeitung, adds that the shopping centre suits its surrounding landscape and bears the striking signature of its architect.
