= Altes Schloss (Scheiden) =

Ruin of a medieval castle near Scheiden

- Losheim am See - Scheiden in Germany
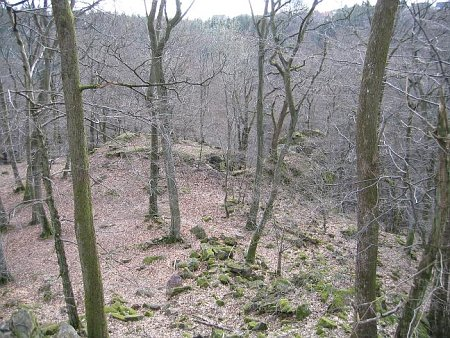

Site information
- Condition: Ruins

Location
- Coordinates: 49.545707°N 6.738207°E

Site history
- Built: 12th to 13th Century

The Altes Schloss, or Old Castle in English, is the ruin of a high medieval hilltop castle near Scheiden, a district of the municipality of Losheim am See in the Merzig-Wadern district in Saarland, Germany.

The remains of the walls of the historically untraceable castle complex are located on a small hill, approximately half a kilometer east of the village center of Scheiden. A clearly distinguishable upper castle, situated at the edge of a high plateau and protected by a ditch, can be seen from a larger lower castle, situated about 10 meters lower on a projecting hillside terrace. The upper castle is roughly rectangular and had a stronger shield wall facing the vulnerable side. In the lower castle, at the southernmost point, are the remains of a slightly elevated rectangular building, as well as traces of a curtain wall with a gate on the eastern side.

There is no documentary evidence for the castle site (the name "Old Castle" is post-medieval ). However, based on the layout and remaining walls, it can be dated to the 12th or 13th century.

== Alternative name ==
Locally, the ruin is sometimes referred to as the "Römerburg" (Roman Castle). This is due to speculation that the site, or perhaps an earlier structure on the same spot, could have been a Roman observation post, tower, rampart or Propugnaculum ( The dictionary definition of Propugnaculum at Wiktionary), though the dating of the existing masonry points to the medieval period.

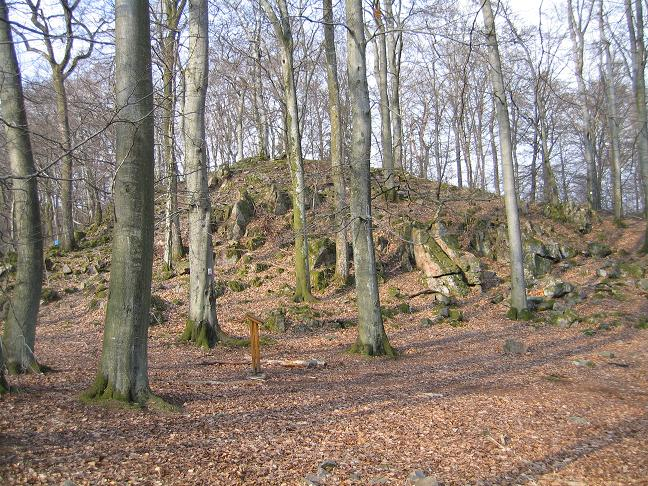
Altes Schloss Scheiden Burgstall

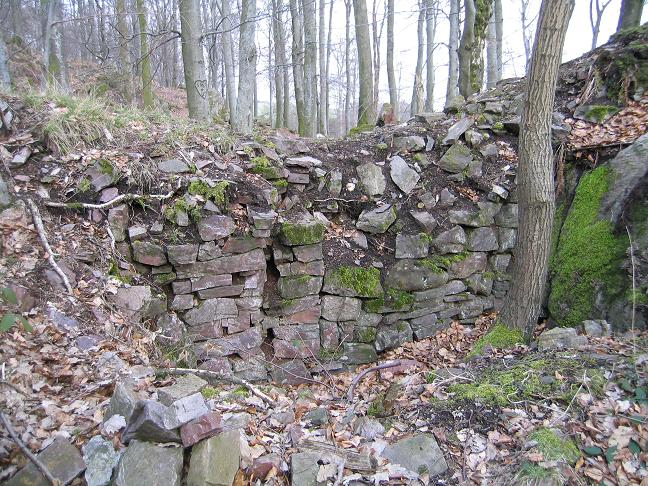
Simply layered remains of the wall

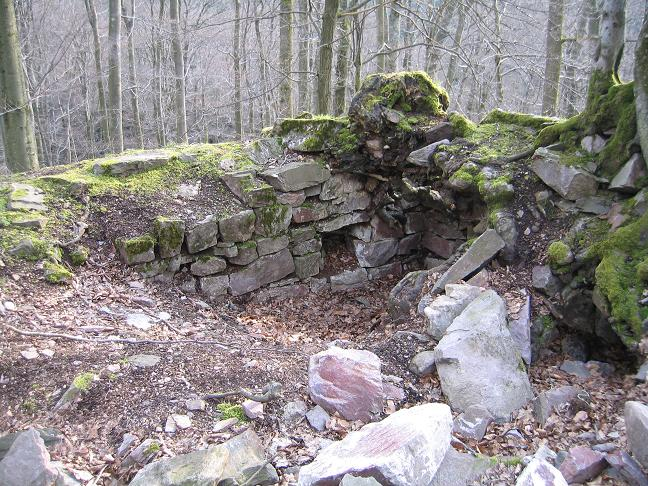
Remains of wall.

== Literature ==
- Robert Seyler: Burgen und Schlösser im Land an der Saar. ZGSaargegend 5, 1955
