= Eggerbach =

Location
- Country: Germany
- State: Bavaria

Physical characteristics
- Mouth
  - location: Eggolsheim, Forchheim, Bavaria
  - coordinates: 49°46′14″N 11°01′39″E
- Length: 13.0 km (8.1 mi)

Basin features
- Progression: Regnitz→ Main→ Rhine→ North Sea

The Eggerbach is a river in Upper Franconia in the south German state of Bavaria. It flows into the Regnitz in the municipality of Eggolsheim.

== See also ==
- List of rivers of Bavaria
