= Altes Schloss (Oberzaunsbach) =

Burgstall Altes Schloss
- Pretzfeld-Oberzaunsbach-"Zaunsbacher Berg"
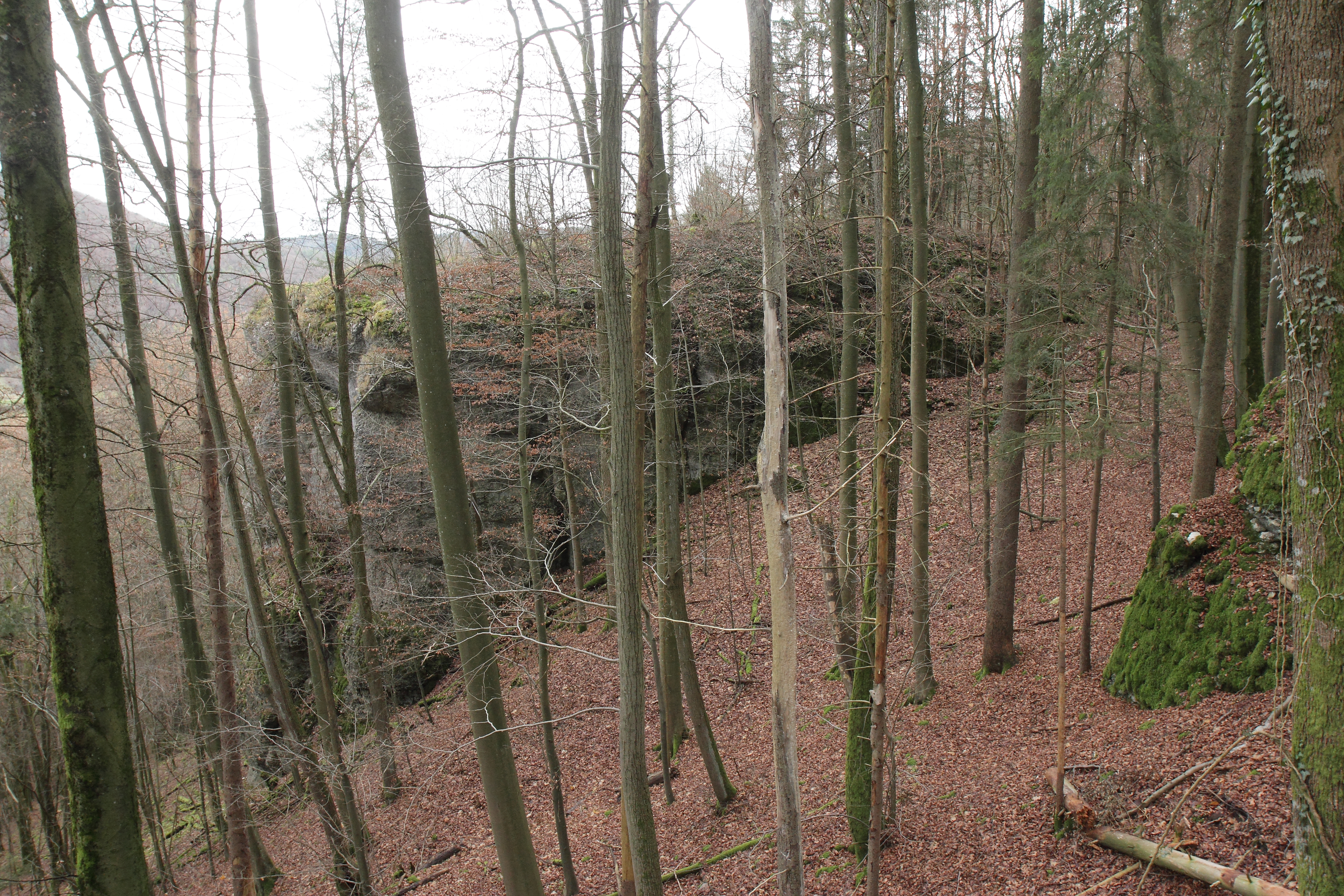
- The burgstall of the Altes Schloss. Castle rock seen from the NW (December 2014)

Site information
- Type: hill castle, hillside location
- Code: DE-BY
- Condition: burgstall, neck ditch

Location
- Coordinates: 49°43′27″N 11°14′30″E
- Height: 450 m above sea level (NN)

Site history
- Built: Medieval

The burgstall of the Altes Schloss ("Old Castle", German: Burgstall Altes Schloss) is the site of a, now levelled, medieval castle on the hillside of the Zaunsbacher Berg above the valley of the Trubach. It lies around 1,000 metres south-shouteast of the village of Oberzaunsbach in the Upper Franconian municipality of Pretzfeld in the south German state of Bavaria.

No historical or archaeological information exists about this castle. It has been roughly dated to the medieval period. All that has survived of the castle is a neck ditch which is probably largely natural. The site is listed as heritage site number D-4-6233-0072: Mittelalterlicher Burgstall.

== Description ==
The simple site of the spur castle lies at around 450 m above sea level (NN) on a rocky crag on the hill of Zaunsbacher Berg that juts northwards into the Trubach valley. (Image 3). It thus lies about 130 metres above the valley floor and is densely wooded today (Image 2).

The castle rock is separated from the uphill slopes of the hillside on the southwestern side of the site by a gently arched gully in the terrain, about 6.5 metres deep and up to 20 metres wide (Image 6). It runs for about 45 metres in a northwest to southeast direction. This gully, which is probably largely natural, was used as a neck ditch, and was probably deepened in the Middle as a spoil heap at both ends of the ditch, where it ends at steep slopes, indicates (Images 4 and 5). In the northern part of ditch is an eight-metre-long and roughly 1.8-metre-wide ditch-like depression. Whether this is natural or manmade is uncertain (Images 4 and 7).

The ovale, relatively level castle site measures 30 by 18 metres and is about five metres above the floor of the ditch (Image 8). Its southern part is slightly higher (Image 9). Apart from the side bounded by the neck ditch, the edge of the site drops for several metres down vertical rock faces (title image and Image 2). No traces of the foundations walls of any castle buildings have been discovered to date. From the castle rock there are good views over the Trubach valley and it is on the line of sight to the neighbouring Wichsenstein Castle

== Gallery ==
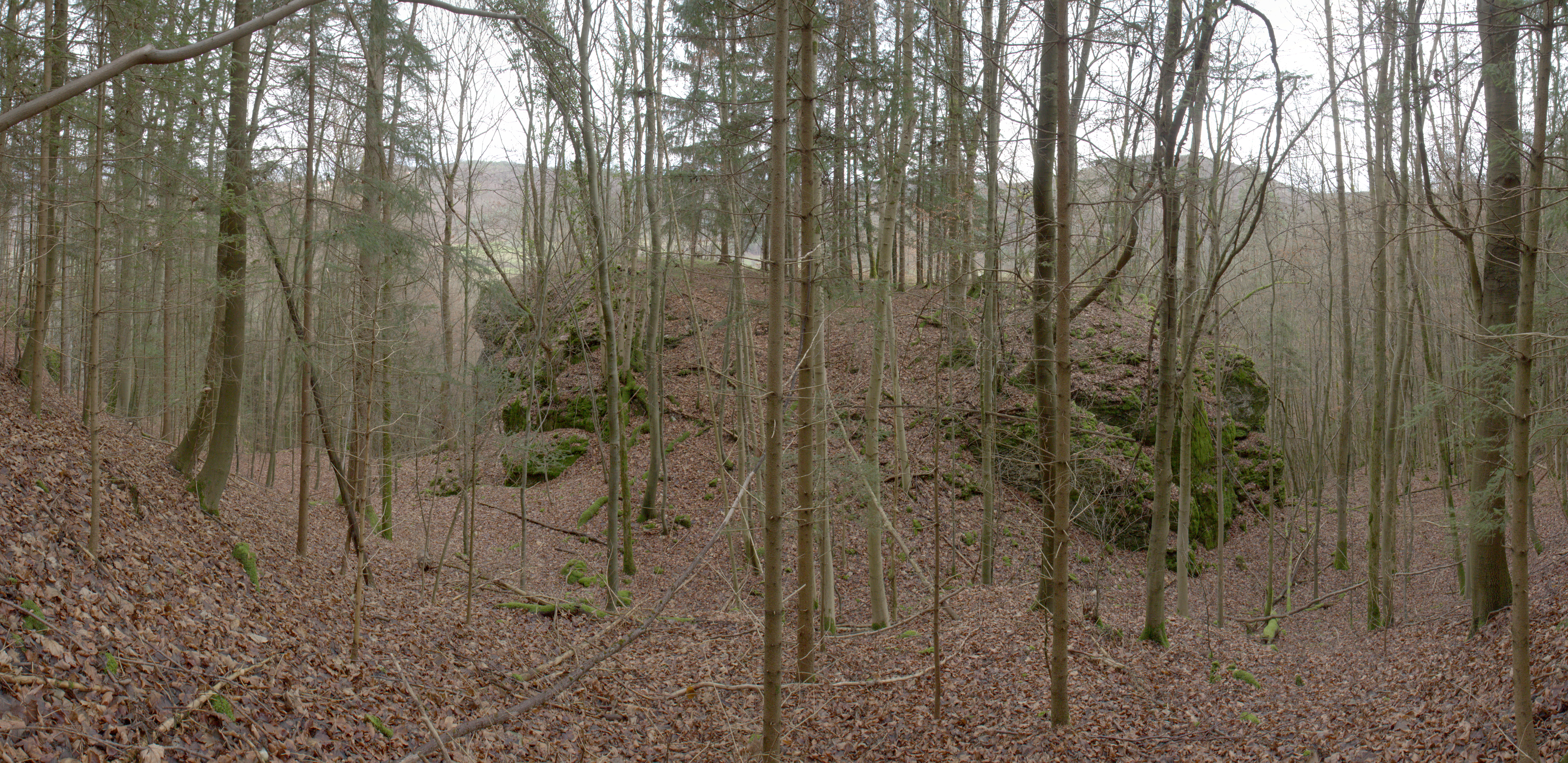
Image 2: View from the hill of the burgstall terrain (Dec 2014)
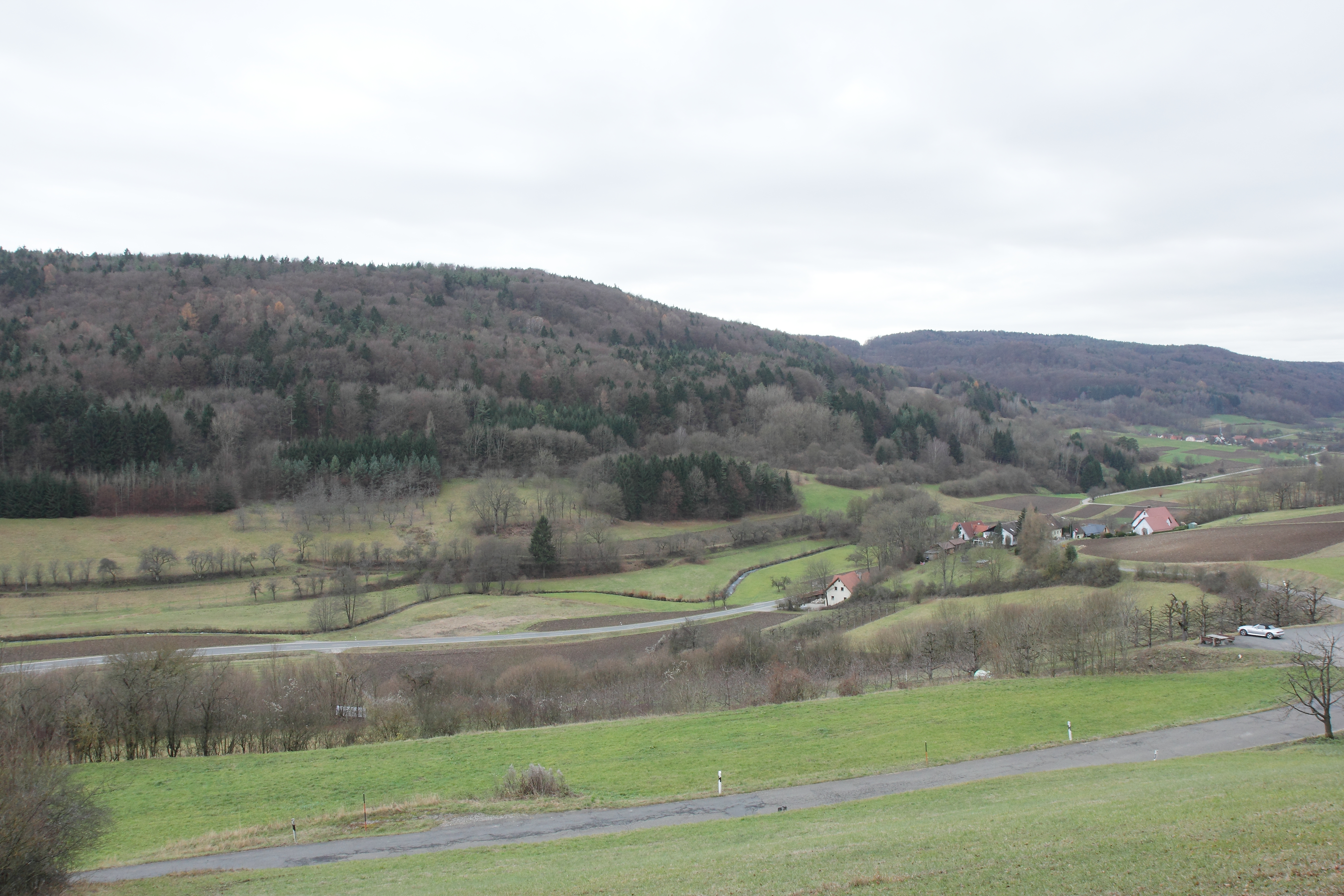
Image 3: View of the Zaunsbacher Berg from the NE above the valley of the Trubach (Dec 2014)

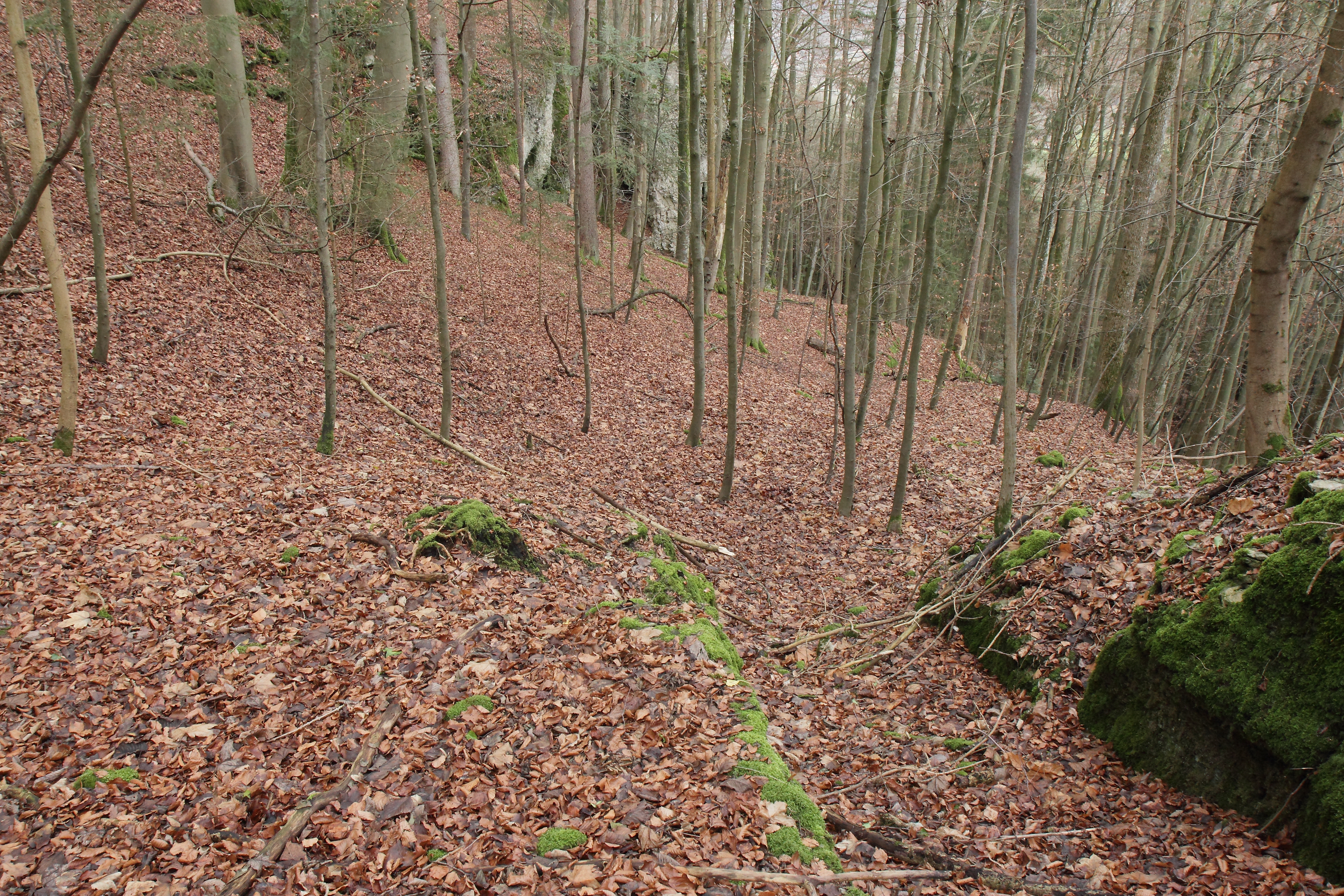
Image 4: NW end of the ditch (Dec 2014)

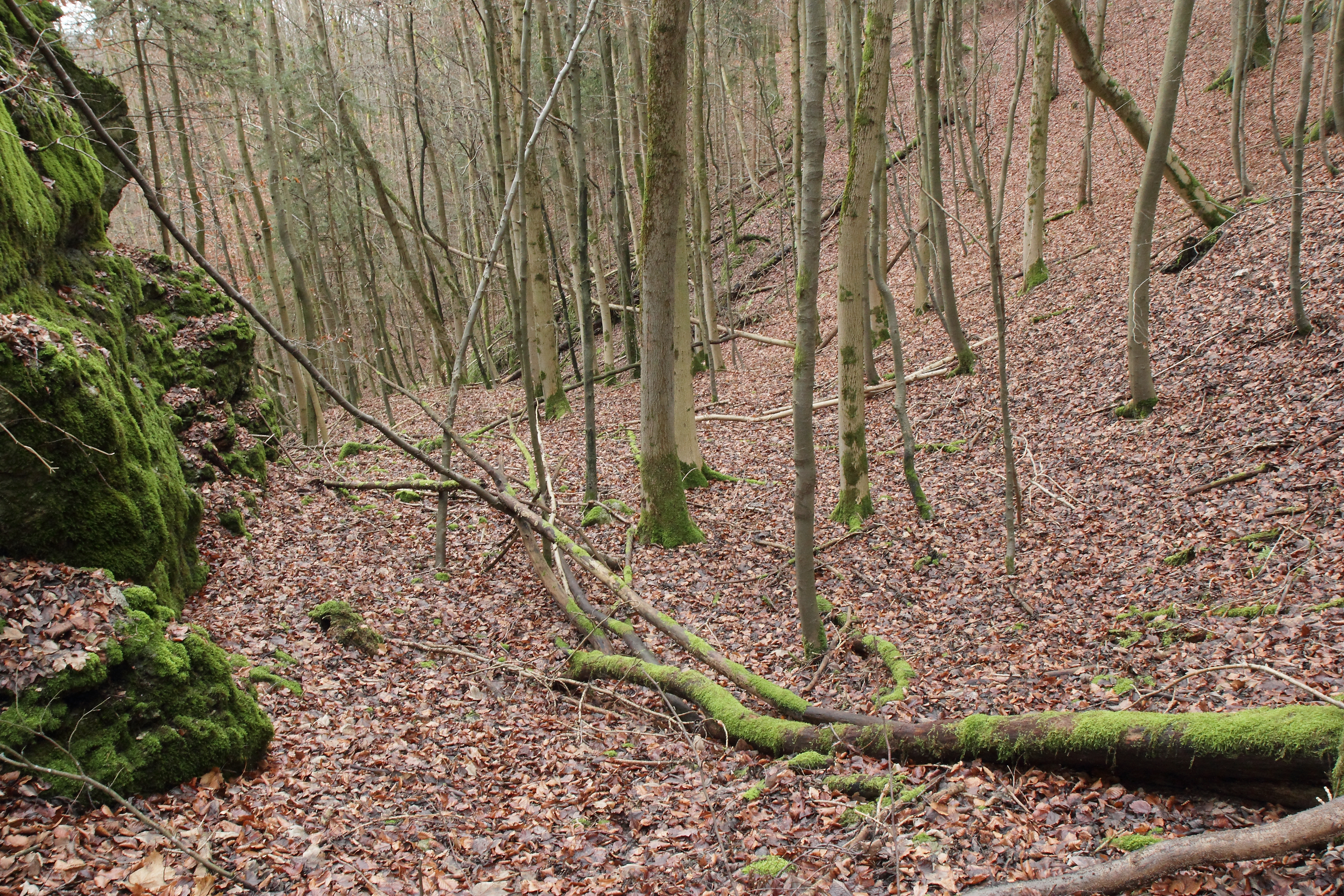
Image 5: SE end of the ditch (Dec 2014)

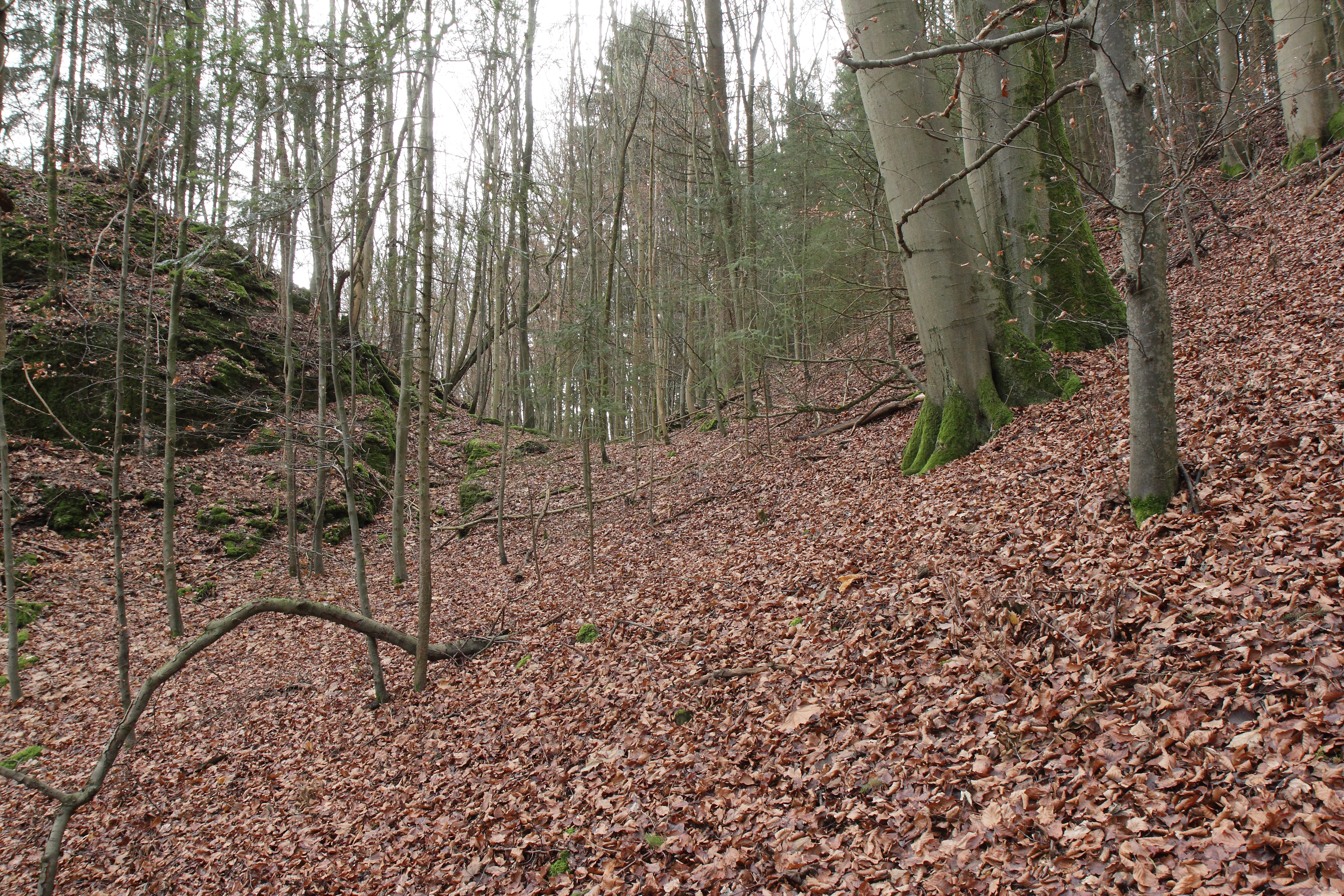
Image 6: Profile of the ditch. L: the castle site (Dec 2014)

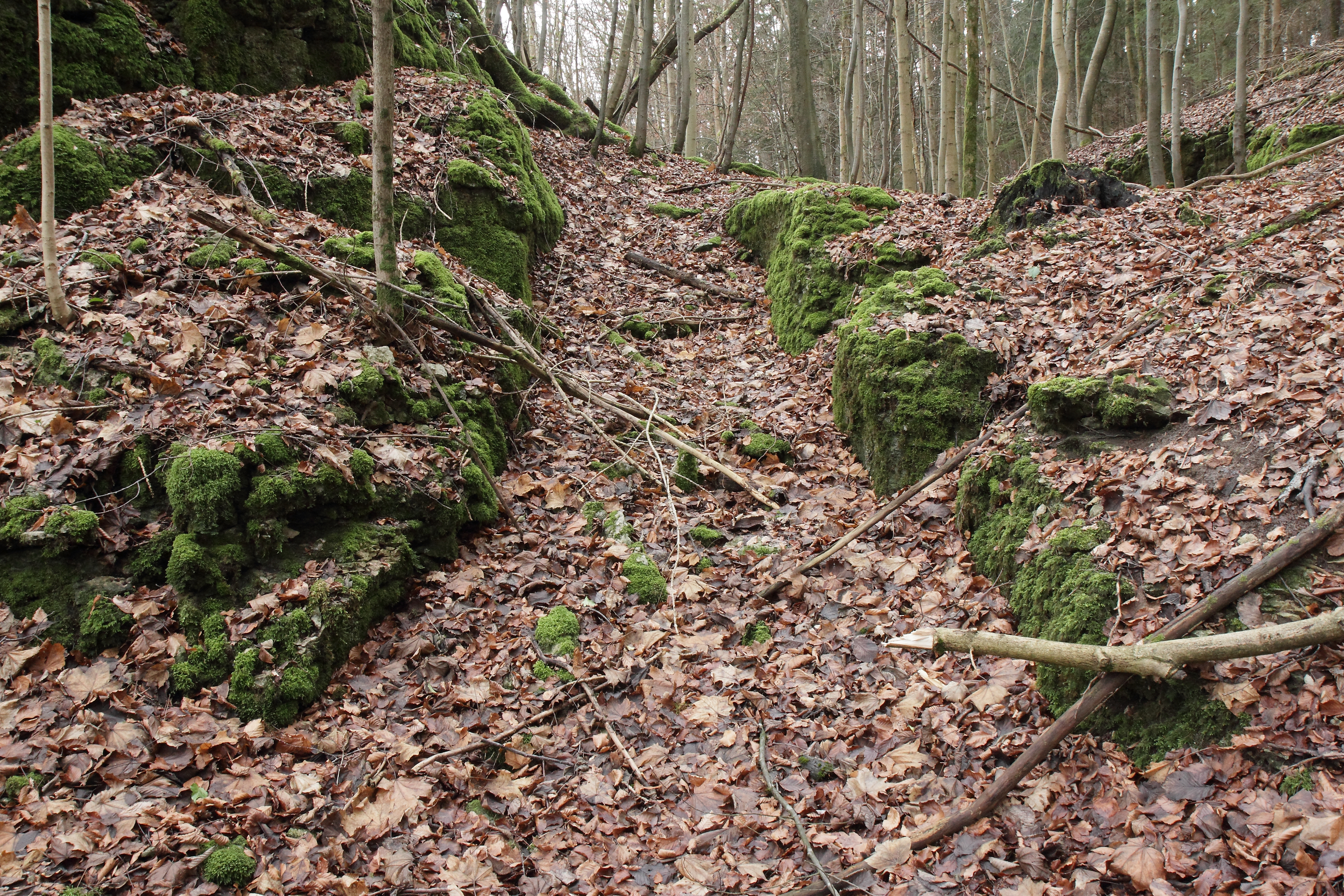
Image 7: Ditch-like depression in the neck ditch (Dec 2014)

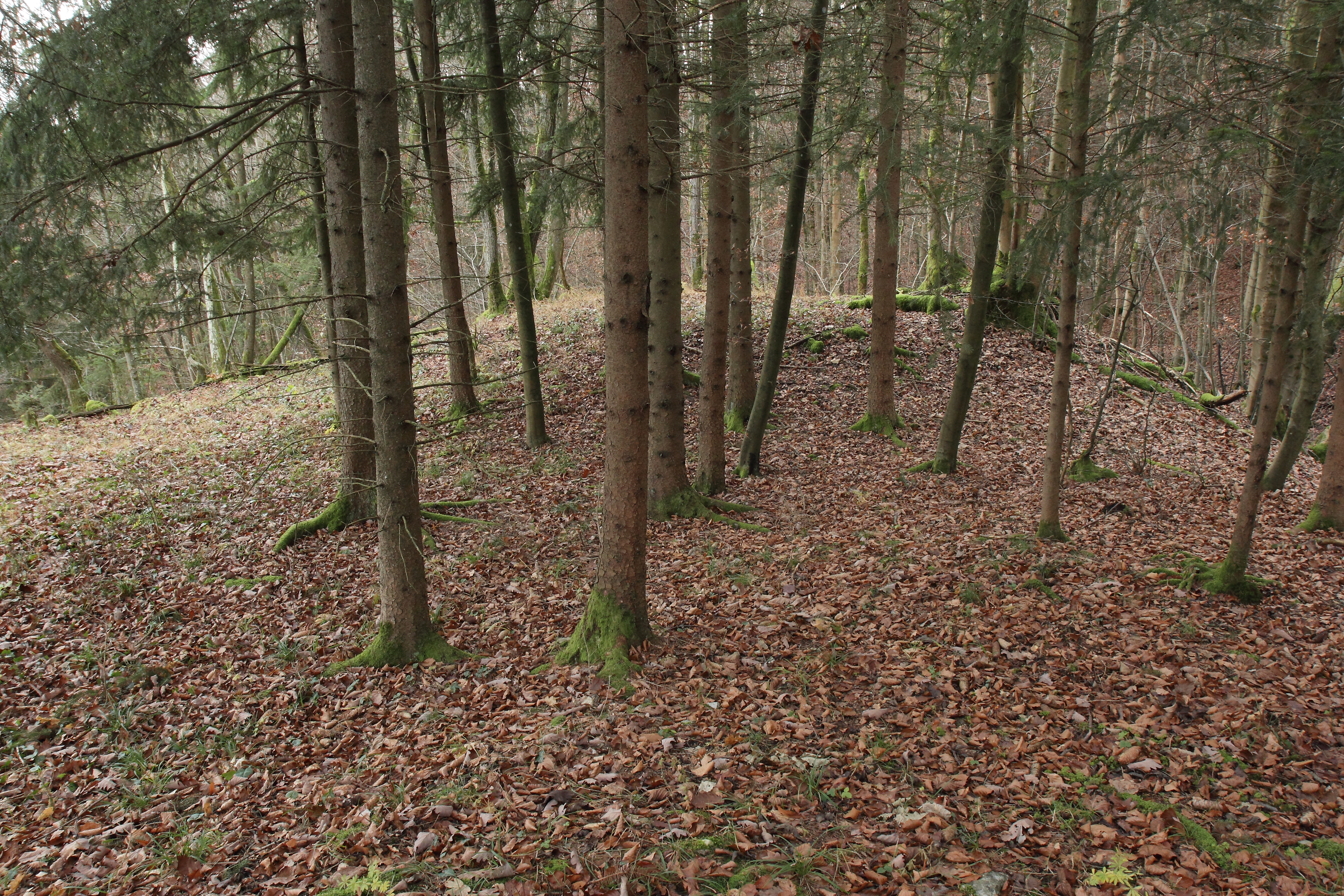
Image 8: View over the slightly higher SE site of the site (Dec 2014)

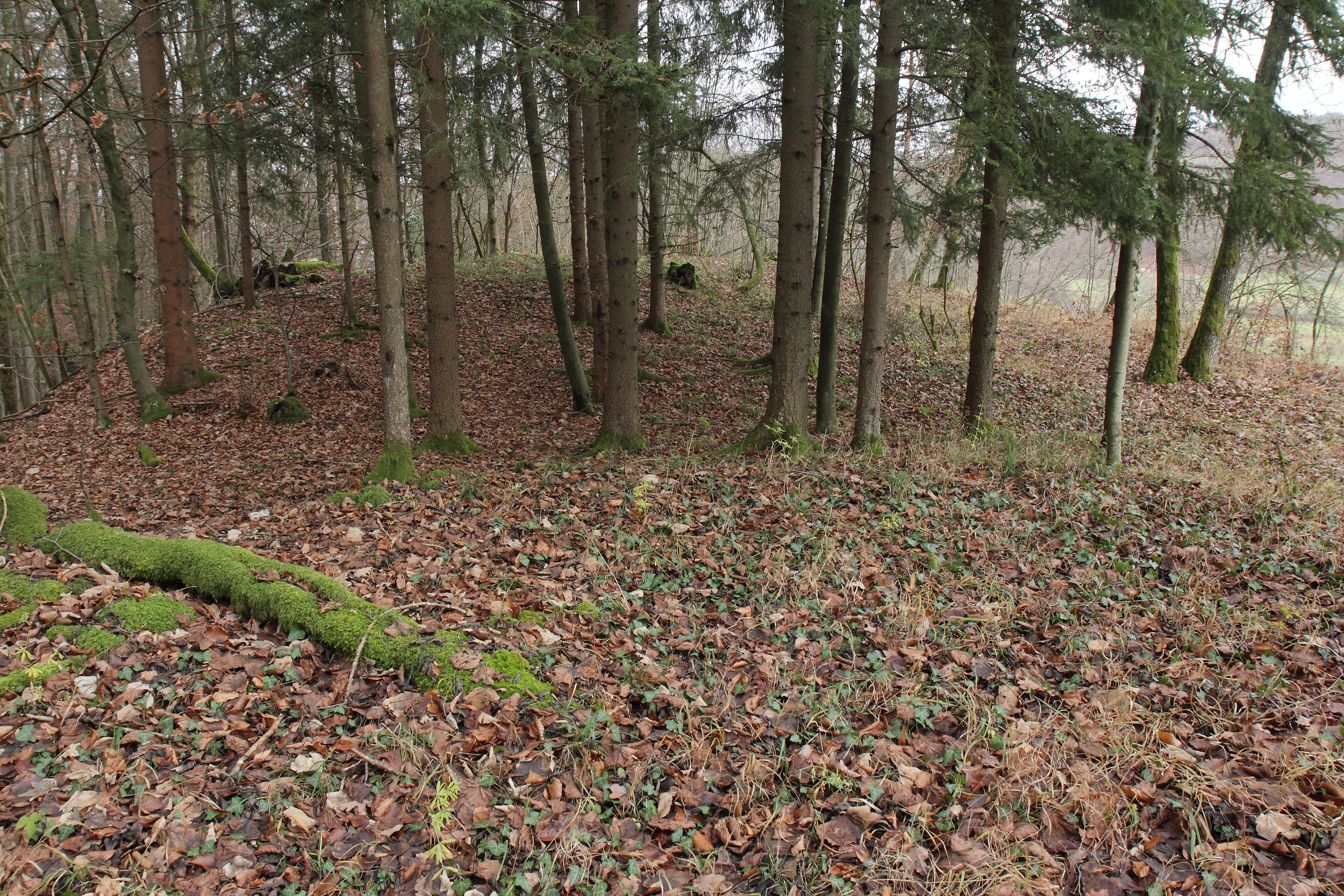
Image 9: N side of the site (Dec 2014)

== Literature ==
- Walter Heinz: Ehemalige Adelssitze im Trubachtal. Verlag Palm und Enke, Erlangen and Jena, 1996, ISBN 3-7896-0554-9, pp. 191–194.
- Hellmut Kunstmann: Die Burgen der südwestlichen Fränkischen Schweiz. 2. Auflage. Kommissionsverlag Degener & Co, Neustadt an der Aisch, 1990, pp. 260–261.
- Klaus Schwarz: Die vor- und frühgeschichtlichen Geländedenkmäler Oberfrankens. (Materialhefte zur bayerischen Vorgeschichte, Series B, Volume 5). Verlag Michael Lassleben, Kallmünz, 1955, p. 98.
