= Altes Schloss (Bad Berneck) =

Castle ruins in Bad Berneck, Bavaria, Germany

- Wrongly: Walpotenburg, lower castle
- Bad Berneck
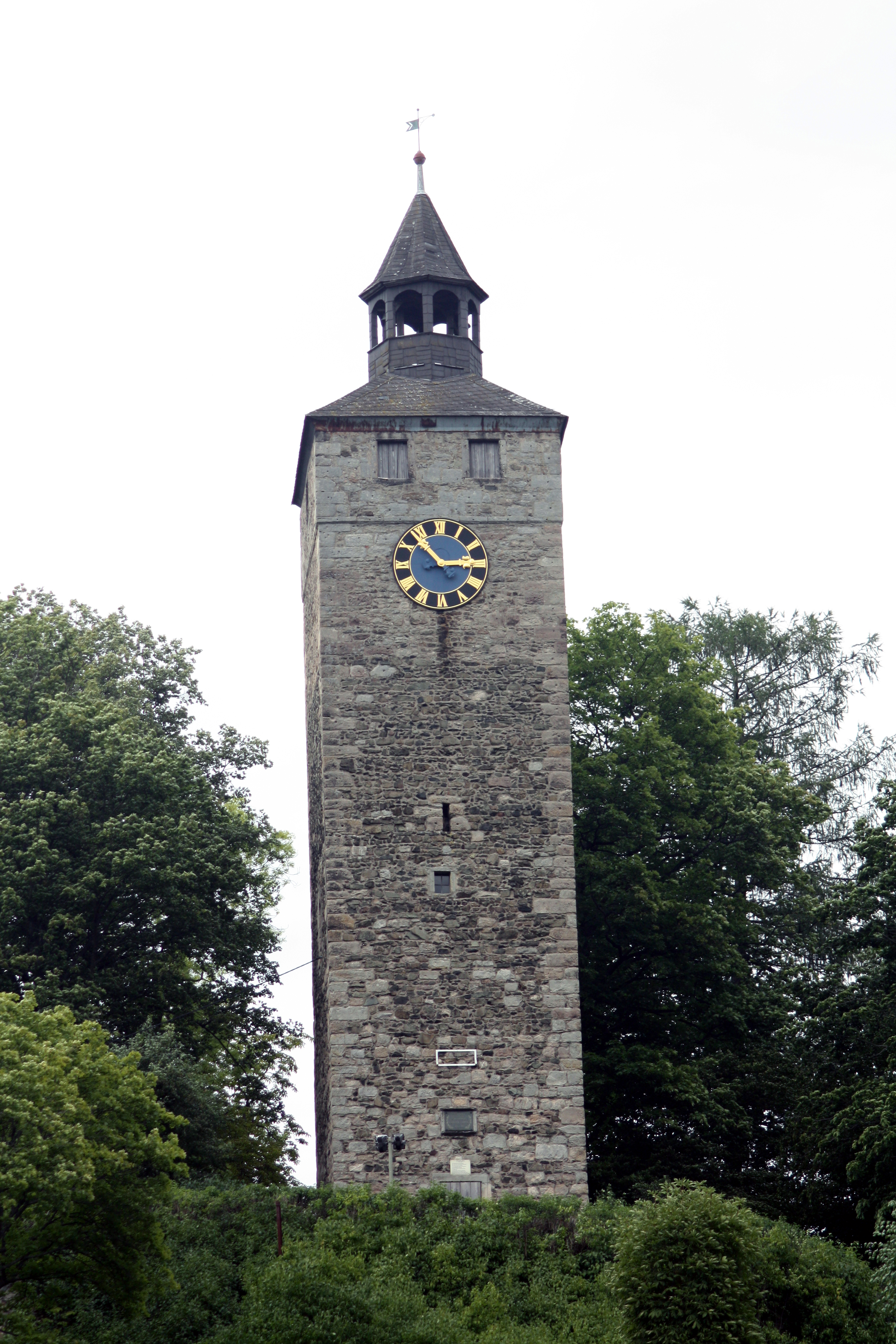
- The keep of the Altes Schloss

Site information
- Type: Hill castle on a spur
- Code: DE-BY
- Condition: Ruins

Location
- Coordinates: 50.050727°N 11.674984°E
- Height: 442 m above sea level (NN)

Site history
- Built: 1st half of the 13th century
- Materials: Diabase rubblestone walls

Garrison information
- Occupants: Ministeriales

The Altes Schloss ("Old Castle") near Bad Berneck in south Germany is a ruined castle built in the Gothic style as an Amtsburg towards the end of the High Middle Ages. The castle lies on the Schlossberg ("castle hill") of Bad Berneck in the Upper Franconian district of Bayreuth in Bavaria. Today the lofty keep is the emblem of this small spa town.

The ruins are open to the public at any time.

== Geographical location ==
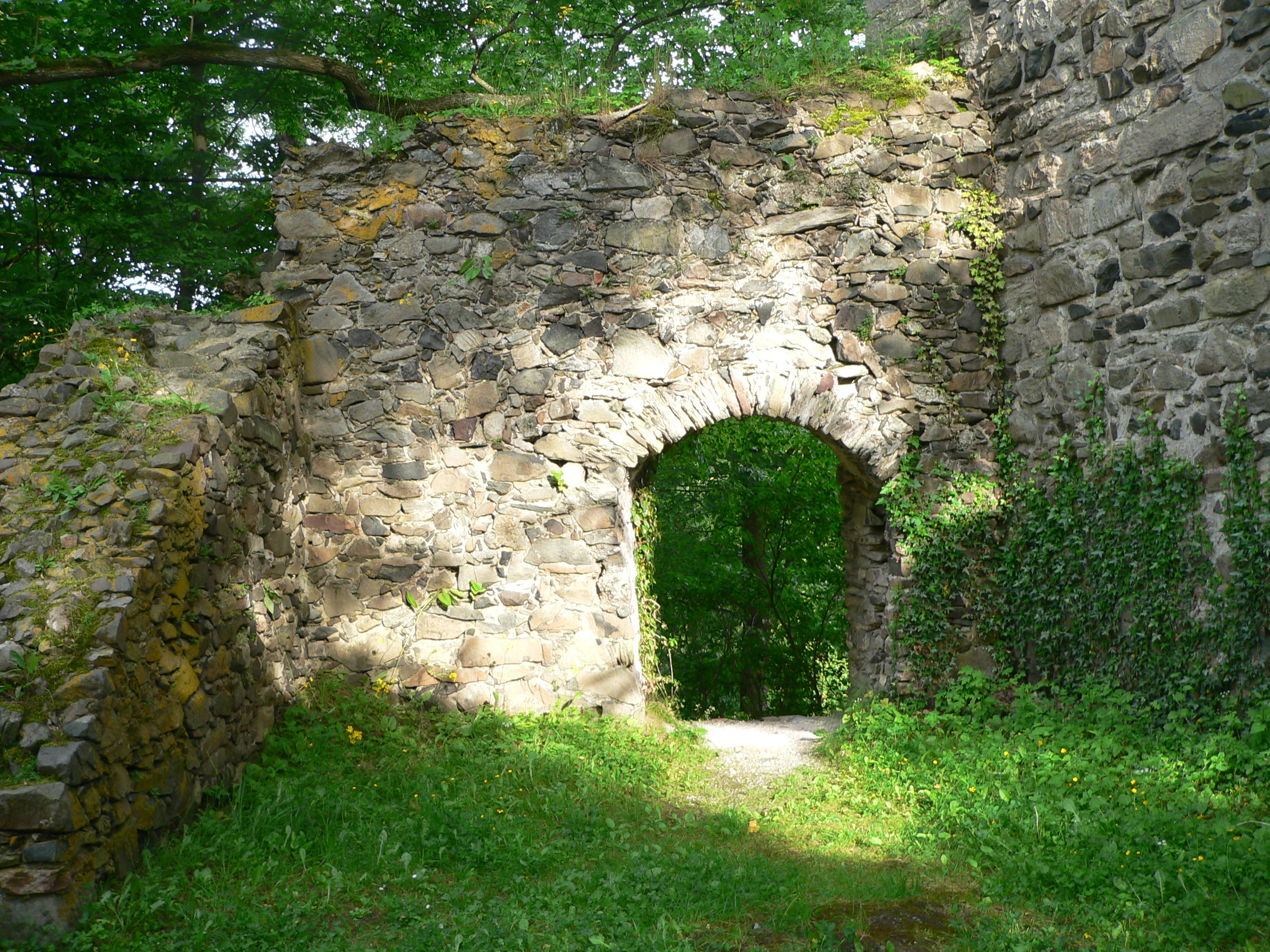
Inner castle gate - east side

The keep of the Altes Schloss towers above the surrounding houses and market square in the upper part of the Kneipp spa of Bad Berneck. To the west at the foot of the castle the roadbed of the historic road, the Via Imperii still climbs up the hill. A free car park (am Anger) is located on the outskirts of Berneck on the B2 federal road from where the castle is a 15-minute walk along the footpath. The town's open-air stage lies immediately to the north, beneath the castle ruins.

A visit to the Altes Schloss may be combined with a visit to the ruins of Hohenberneck Castle a few metres above the Altes Schlosses and the motte (Turmhügelburg) of Alt-Berneck at the exit to the spa park (Kurpark).

== History of the castle ==
=== The Walpote prelude ===
In 1168 there is the first indication of a free aristocratic (edelfrei) line in Berneck with the mention of the Walpote, Uodalrich II. It can therefore be assumed that there was already a noble seat here at that time. This "Walpote castle" (Walpotenburg) was not, as is often assumed, on the same spot as the Altes Schloss, but above the old castle on the site of a later castle, Hohenberneck (see Kunstmann). The founding of this castle was rather unfortunate for the Walpotes, since it was built illegally on land belonging to the Bamberg church of Saint James. In 1177 - the year the first Andechs-Meranian prince-bishop, Poppo I was appointed - the Walpotenburg of Uodalrich II had to be enfeoffed by the Diocese of Bamberg. The last mention of a Walpote of Berneck dates to the year 1203.

== Sources ==
- Johann Theodor Benjamin Helfrecht: Ruinen, Alterthümer und noch stehende Schlösser auf und an dem Fichtelgebirg. Gottfried Adolph Grau, Hof 1795 (online).
- Johann Gottlieb Hentze: Berneck, ein historischer Versuch. Johann Andreas Lünecks Erben, Bayreuth 1790 (online).
- Hellmut Kunstmann: Burgen in Oberfranken, II. Teil. Die Burgen der edelfreien Geschlechter im Obermaingebiet. E. C. Baumann, Kulmbach 1955.
- Gustav Schmidt: Einstige Burgen um Bad Berneck. In: Heimatbeilage zum oberfränkischen Schulanzeiger. Regierung von Oberfranken, Bayreuth 2002.
- Otto Schoerrig: Bad Berneck und seine Umgebung. R. Teichmann, Bad Berneck 1983.
- Ingrid Burger-Segl: Archäologische Streifzüge im Meranierland. Schriften zur Heimatpflege in Oberfranken. Bezirk Oberfranken. Bayreuth 1999, ISBN 3-9804971-4-3.
