= Friesener Warte =

German hill

- Location within Bavaria

Highest point
- Elevation: 561.7 m (1,843 ft)
- Coordinates: 49°51′N 11°03′E

Geography
- Location: Bavaria, Germany

Friesener Warte is a hill in Bavaria, Germany.
