= Weilersbach =

- Municipality
- Coat of arms

- Location of Weilersbach within Forchheim district
- Interactive map of Weilersbach
- Location within Germany Location within Bavaria
- Coordinates: 49°45′N 11°07′E
- Country: Germany
- State: Bavaria
- Admin. region: Oberfranken
- District: Forchheim
- Municipal assoc.: Kirchehrenbach
- Subdivisions: 5 Ortsteile

Area
  - Total: 8.61 km^{2} (3.32 sq mi)
- Elevation: 295 m (968 ft)

Population (2025-12-31)
  - Total: 1,991
  - Density: 231/km^{2} (599/sq mi)
- Time zone: UTC+01:00 (CET)
  - Summer (DST): UTC+02:00 (CEST)
- Postal codes: 91365
- Dialling codes: 09191
- Vehicle registration: FO
- Website: www.weilersbach.de

Weilersbach (German pronunciation: [ˈvaɪlɐsbax]) is a municipality in the district of Forchheim in Bavaria in Germany.
