= Eggolsheim =

- Municipality
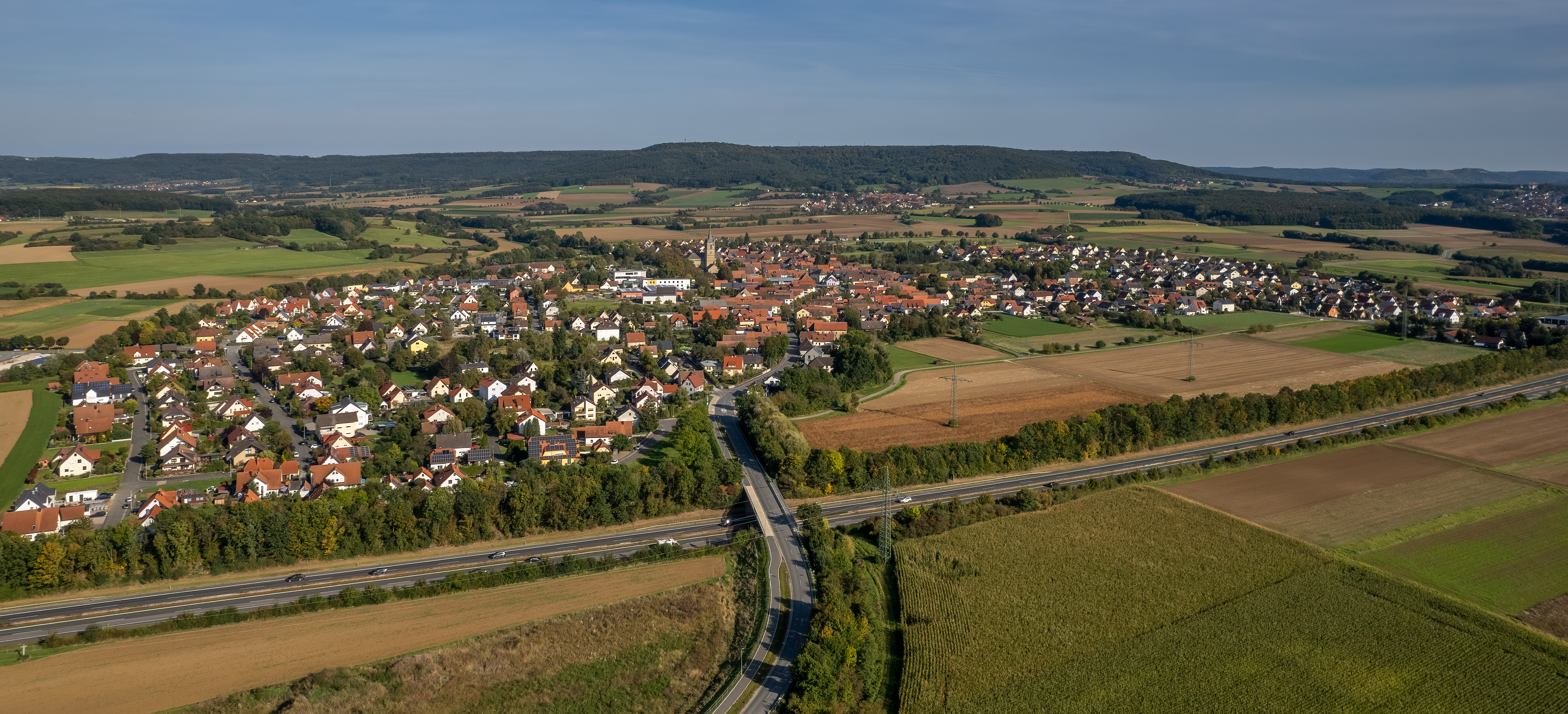
- Aerial view

- Coat of arms

- Location of Eggolsheim within Forchheim district
- Interactive map of Eggolsheim
- Location within Germany Location within Bavaria
- Coordinates: 49°46′15″N 11°03′29″E
- Country: Germany
- State: Bavaria
- Admin. region: Oberfranken
- District: Forchheim
- Subdivisions: 13 Ortsteile

Government
  - Mayor: Georg Eismann (CSU)

Area
  - Total: 48.90 km^{2} (18.88 sq mi)
- Elevation: 455 m (1,493 ft)

Population (2025-12-31)
  - Total: 6,521
  - Density: 133.4/km^{2} (345.4/sq mi)
- Time zone: UTC+01:00 (CET)
  - Summer (DST): UTC+02:00 (CEST)
- Postal codes: 91330
- Dialling codes: 09545
- Vehicle registration: FO
- Website: www.eggolsheim.de

Eggolsheim is a municipality in the district of Forchheim in Bavaria in Germany.

== Subdivisions ==
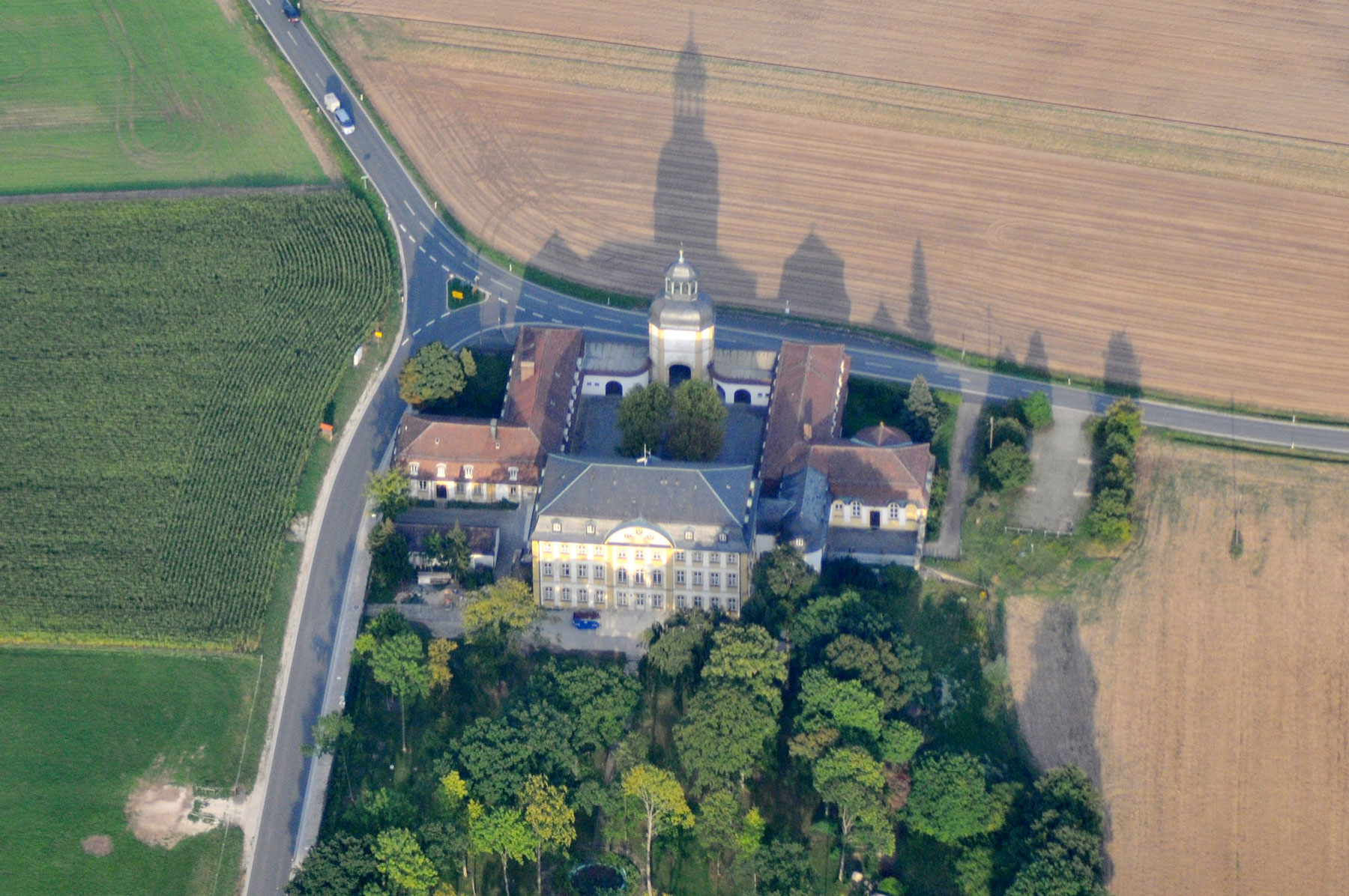
Jägersburg Castle near Eggolsheim

Eggolsheim has twelve other villages within its municipal area:

- Bammersdorf
- Drosendorf
- Drügendorf
- Eggolsheim
- Götzendorf
- Jägersburg
- Kauernhofen
- Neuses an der Regnitz
- Rettern
- Schirnaidel
- Tiefenstürmig
- Unterstürmig
- Weigelshofen
