= Alte Burg =

Alte Burg, Alteburg or Burgstall Alte Burg refers to the name or nickname of various castles, castle ruins, castle sites and hillforts or ringworks:

== Germany ==
- Alte Burg (Altenstein), hillfort site near Altenstein (Maroldsweisach), county of Haßberge, Bavaria
- Alte Burg (Aull), water castle in Aull, Rhein-Lahn-Kreis, Rhineland-Palatinate
- Alte Burg (Bad Münstereifel), hillfort site near Bad Münstereifel, county of Euskirchen, North Rhine-Westphalia
- Alte Burg (Berka vor dem Hainich), ramparts in the Hainich, near Berka, Wartburgkreis, Thuringia
- Alte Burg (Beuggen), castle site near Rheinfelden, county of Lörrach, Baden-Württemberg
- Alte Burg (Boppard), castle in Boppard, Rhein-Hunsrück-Kreis, Rhineland-Palatinate
- Alte Burg (Bühle), castle site near Bühle (Northeim), county of Northeim, Niedersachsen
- Alte Burg (Burgsinn), castle ruins in Burgsinn, county of Main-Spessart, Bavaria
- Alte Burg (Demmingen), castle site near Demmingen (Dischingen), county of Heidenheim, Baden-Württemberg
- Alte Burg (Einöd), castle site (motte and bailey castle) near Einöd, Saarpfalz-Kreis, Saarland
- Alte Burg (Elbtal), castle ruins near Elbgrund (Elbtal), county of Limburg-Weilburg, Hesse
- Alte Burg (Gimmeldingen), castle ruins in Gimmeldingen in the borough of Neustadt an der Weinstraße, Rhineland-Palatinate
- Alte Burg (Hafenpreppach), castle site near Hafenpreppach (Maroldsweisach), county of Haßberge, Bavaria
- Alte Burg (Harrbach), castle ruins near Gemünden, county of Main-Spessart, Bavaria
- Alte Burg (Hummertsried) (Hummersried), castle site near Hummertsried (Eberhardzell), county of Biberach, Baden-Württemberg
- Alte Burg (Koblenz), water castle in the city of Koblenz in Rhineland-Palatinate
- Alte Burg (Labach), castle site near Labach (Saarwellingen), county of Saarlouis, Saarland
- Alte Burg (Lage), castle site in Lage, county of Lippe, North Rhine-Westphalia
- Alte Burg (Langenenslingen), Celtic hill settlement near Emerfeld (Langenenslingen), county of Biberach, Baden-Württemberg
- Alte Burg (Laudert), castle site in Laudert, Rhein-Hunsrück-Kreis, Rhineland-Palatinate
- Alte Burg (Lauffen am Neckar), castle site in Lauffen am Neckar, county of Heilbronn, Baden-Württemberg
- Alte Burg (Lipporn), castle ruins near Lipporn, Rhein-Lahn-Kreis, Rhineland-Palatinate
- Alte Burg (Lispenhausen), castle site near Lispenhausen (Rotenburg an der Fulda), county of Hersfeld-Rotenburg, Hesse
- Alte Burg (Lommersdorf), castle site near Lommersdorf (Blankenheim), county of Euskirchen, North Rhine-Westphalia
- Ringwall Alteburg (Lorsbach), castle site near Lorsbach (Hofheim), Main-Taunus-Kreis, Hesse
- Alte Burg (Neuburg an der Donau), castle ruins near Neuburg an der Donau, county of Neuburg-Schrobenhausen, Bavaria
- Alte Burg (Netphen), castle site near Dreis-Tiefenbach (Netphen), county of Siegen-Wittgenstein, North Rhine-Westphalia
- Alte Burg (Nettersheim), castle site in Nettersheim, county of Euskirchen, North Rhine-Westphalia
- Alte Burg Neustadt-Glewe, castle in Neustadt-Glewe, county of Ludwigslust-Parchim, Mecklenburg-Vorpommern
- Alte Burg (Nieder-Beerbach), castle site near Nieder-Beerbach (Mühltal), county of Darmstadt-Dieburg, Hesse
- Alte Burg (Nörvenich), castle ruins near Nörvenich, county of Düren, North Rhine-Westphalia
- Alte Burg (Osterode), castle ruins near Osterode, county of Osterode am Harz, Niedersachsen
- Alte Burg (Padberg), castle ruins near Padberg (Marsberg), Hochsauerlandkreis, North Rhine-Westphalia
- Alte Burg Penzlin, castle in Penzlin, county of Mecklenburgische Seenplatte, Mecklenburg-Vorpommern
- Alteburg (Reutlingen), castle ruins in Reutlingen, Baden-Württemberg
- Alte Burg (Rotenhain), castle ruins (motte and bailey) near Rotenhain in the Westerwald hills, Westerwaldkreis, Rhineland-Palatinate
- Alte Burg (Unterrath), castle site (motte and bailey) in Unterrath in the city of Düsseldorf, North Rhine-Westphalia
- Alte Burg (Wewer), water castle in Paderborn-Wewer, North Rhine-Westphalia
- Alteburg (Essen), hillfort site in Werden (Essen), North Rhine-Westphalia
- Alteburg (Kohden), castle site in Kohden (Nidda), Wetteraukreis, Hesse
- Turmhügel Alteburg, castle site near Röttingen, county of Würzburg, Bavaria

Alte Burg as an alternative name:

- Alsterburg (Alte Burg), castle site in Hamburg
- Entenstein Castle (Alte Burg), castle site near Rodalben, county of Südwestpfalz, Rhineland-Palatinate
- Hardenberg Castle (Velbert) (Alte Burg), castle site between Neviges and Tönisheide (Velbert), county of Mettmann, North Rhine-Westphalia
- Heimburg Castle (Alteburg, Altenburg), castle ruins near Heimburg (Blankenburg), county of Harz, Saxony-Anhalt
- Longuich Castle (Alte Burg), fortified house in Longuich, county of Trier-Saarburg, Rhineland-Palatinate
- Meersburg Castle (Alte Burg), castle ruins in Meersburg am Bodensee, Bodenseekreis, Baden-Württemberg
- Trochtelfingen Castle (Alte Burg), castle ruins near Trochtelfingen, county of Reutlingen, Baden-Württemberg
- Alte Burg (Althausen), castle site near Althausen (Münnerstadt), county of Bad Kissingen, Bavaria
- Alte Burg (Aurachtal), castle site near Aurachtal, county of Erlangen-Höchstadt, Bavaria
- Alte Burg (Unterregenbach), castle site near Unterregenbach (Langenburg), county of Schwäbisch Hall, Baden-Württemberg
- Obere Burg (Zwingenberg) (older name Alte Burg), castle site in Zwingenberg, county of Bergstraße, Hesse
- Ringwall Wirtheim (Alte Burg), lost hillfort site near Biebergemünd-Wirtheim, Main-Kinzig-Kreis, Hesse
- Rüdenburg (Alte Burg), castle rest near Arnsberg, Hochsauerlandkreis, North Rhine-Westphalia

==

Austria==

- Gmünd Castle (Alte Burg), castle ruins in Gmünd, district of Spittal an der Drau, Carinthia, Austria

Alte Burg or Alteburg is the name or nickname of Roman camps (Kastellen) and fortified sites:

- Kastell Arnsburg-Alteburg, Roman Limes camp (area monument) near Lich, county of Gießen, Hesse
- Kastell Alteburg, Roman Limes camp (area monument) near Heftrich (Idstein), Rheingau-Taunus-Kreis, Hesse
- Flottenkastell Alteburg, Roman camp (area monument) near Marienburg (Cologne), North Rhine-Westphalia
- Römerlager Oberbrechen (Alteburg), lost Roman camp near Oberbrechen (Brechen), county of Limburg-Weilburg, Hesse
- Alteburg (Biebergemünd), Celtic settlement and fortifications near Biebergemünd, Main-Kinzig-Kreis, Hesse
- Alteburg (Zell), Late Roman hillfort near Zell an der Mosel (Hunsrück), county of Cochem-Zell, Rhineland-Palatinate

Alte Burg or Alteburg is the name of the following mountains and hills:

- Alte Burg (Afholderbach) (633.0 m), near Afholderbach (Netphen), Rothaar Mountains, county of Siegen-Wittgenstein, North Rhine-Westphalia
- Alteburg (Arnstadt) (398.2 m), near Arnstadt, spur of the Plateau of Gossel in the Ohrdruf Plateau, Ilm-Kreis, Thuringia
- Alte Burg (Gräfenroda) (639.6 m), near Gräfenroda, Thuringian Forest, spur of the Arlesberg (650.8 m), Ilm-Kreis, Thuringia
- Alteburg (Hörre) (445.1 m), near Ballersbach (Mittenaar), highest point in the Hörre, Gladenbach Uplands, Lahn-Dill-Kreis, Hesse
- Alte Burg (Kunst Wittgenstein) (554.0 m), near Kunst Wittgenstein (Bad Laasphe), Rothaar Mountains, county of Siegen-Wittgenstein, North Rhine-Westphalia
- Alteburg (Soonwald) (620.5 m), near Pferdsfeld (Bad Sobernheim), Soonwald, county of Bad Kreuznach, Rhineland-Palatinate
- Alteburg (Vogelsberg) (616.8 m), near Kaulstoß (Schotten), Vogelsberg, Vogelsbergkreis, Hesse
- Alte Burg (Arnsberg) (303 m), also Römberg, site of the Rüdenburg near Arnsberg, Hochsauerlandkreis, North Rhine-Westphalia

Alte Burg is the name of a former princely estate:

- Former Slavic princely estate of Starigard ("Alte Burg"), from the location name Aldinborg and which finally became Oldenburg in Holstein; see Oldenburg in Holstein

Alte Burg or Alteburg may also refer to:

- Alte Burg (nature reserve), in Ballenstedt, county of Harz, Saxony-Anhalt
- Alte Burg Tunnel, tunnel on the Bundesautobahn A 71 (motorway) near the Gräfenroda junction, Ilm-Kreis, Thuringia
- Former wood loading area of an abandoned section of the Nidder Valley Railway, Hesse
- Barony of Alteburg, Baden-Württemberg

== See also ==
- Altburg (disambiguation)
- Altenburg (disambiguation)
- Altes Schloss (disambiguation)
