= Altenburg (disambiguation) =

Altenburg is a city in Thuringia, Germany.

Altenburg may also refer to:

== People ==
- Altenburg (surname)

== Places ==
=== Towns and villages ===
- Altenburg, Missouri, US
- Altenburg, Lower Austria
- Altenburg, a village in Jestetten municipality, Germany
  - Altenburg-Rheinau station, a closed railway station that served Altenburg and Rheinau
- Bad Deutsch-Altenburg, Lower Austria
- A hamlet in Märstetten municipality, Thurgau, Switzerland
- A village incorporated into Brugg municipality, Aargau, Switzerland
- A frazione or subdivision in Kaltern an der Weinstraße, South Tyrol, Italy

=== Historical ===
- Division of Altenburg, 1445: a division of lands in Thuringia and Saxony that led to war
- Saxe-Altenburg, a German duchy and state, in present-day Thuringia
- Saxe-Gotha-Altenburg, a German duchy related to Saxe-Altenburg (1680–1826)
- Raid at Altenburg (1813), in the War of the Sixth Coalition

Altenburg is the German exonym for the towns of:

- Vecpils, Latvia
- Baia de Criș, Hunedoara County, Romania
- Staré Hrady, Czech Republic
- Mosonmagyaróvár, Hungary

=== Castles ===
- Altenburg Castle, Switzerland
- Arnsburg Abbey, the site of mid-12th century Benedictine monastery Altenburg
- Altenburg (Bamberg), castle in Bavaria, Germany
- Altenburg (Heroldsbach), a levelled medieval fortification in Bavaria, Germany
- Heimburg Castle (also known as the Altenburg) in Saxony-Anhalt, Germany

=== Other ===
- Altenburg (Niedenstein), a mountain in Hesse, Germany
- Altenburg (Neuental), a mountain in Hesse, Germany
- Altenburg Abbey, a Benedictine monastery in Altenburg, Lower Austria
- 9336 Altenburg, an asteroid belt discovered in 1991

== See also ==
- Altenberg (disambiguation)
