= Latvianization =

Cultural assimilation of something non-Latvian into Latvian

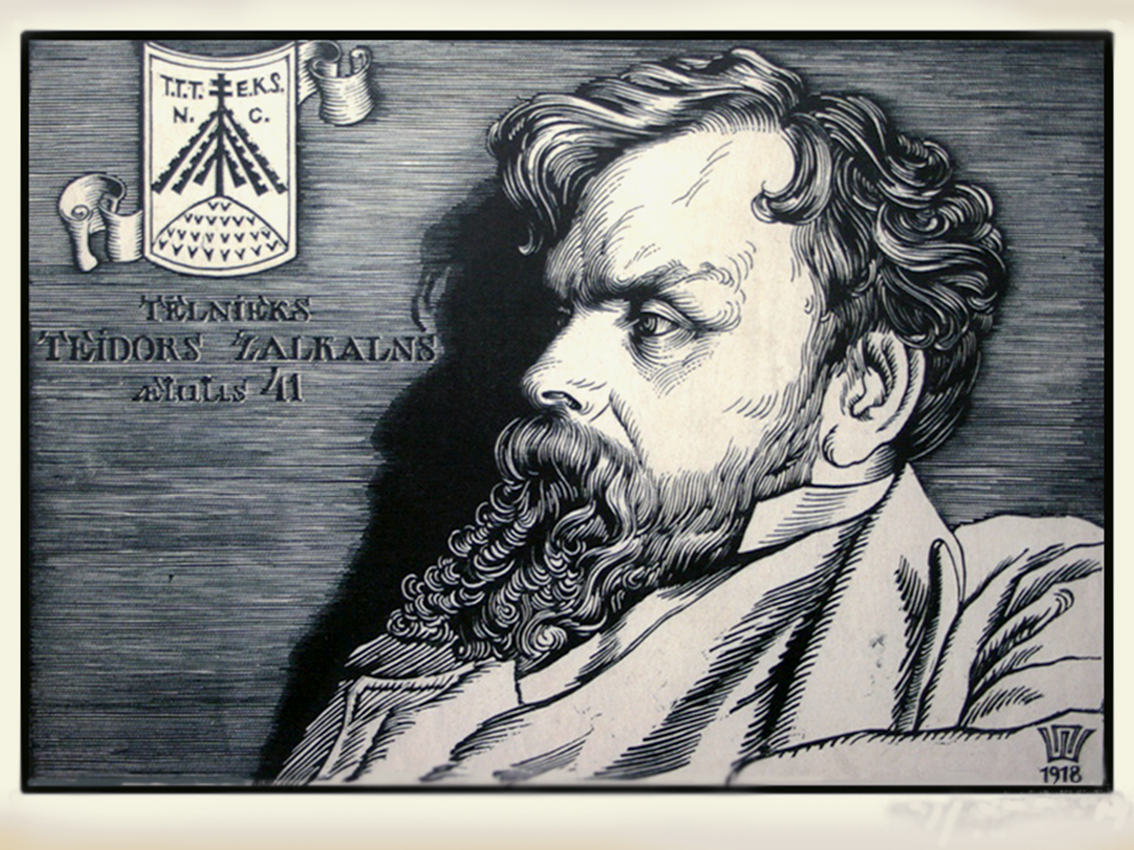
Teodors Zaļkalns Latvianized his birth name Teodors Grīnbergs

Latvianization (sometimes Lettization) is a cultural assimilation of something non-Latvian into Latvian. This process was an important component during the several waves of Latvian national awakening.

== Language ==
The first notable process of Latvianization was during the First Latvian National Awakening, when Germanisms in Latvian started to be replaced with native Latvian ones: beķeris (baker) > maiznieks, duršlags (colander) > caurduris, trekteris (funnel) > piltuve (both words are in use today), and the intolerant attitude was formed towards these borrowings. This process continued over time and by 1990s the Germanic barbarisms (unwarranted borrowings) were to a great extent removed from the literary Latvian.

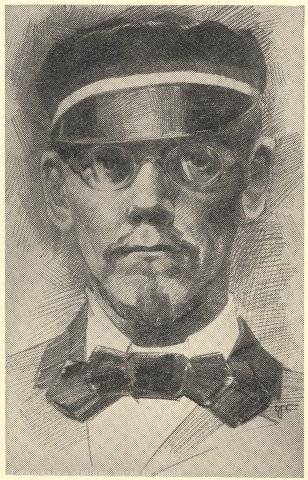
Juris Alunāns

Juris Alunāns was especially active in this and now he is recognized as the father of Latvian linguistics. Notably, he suggested Latvianized names for foreign countries, nationalities, and names of months, elaborating on the suggestion of Krišjānis Valdemārs on the replacement of Germanic-based endings for the names of nationalities -deris, -neris, -teris (superficially Latvianized -der, -ner, -ter) with -ietis, -nieks, -ns, etc. He also created many new Latvian words. In the area of word formation he further promoted the use of the Latvian suffixes -tava, -nieks, and -nīca.

After the period of heavy Russification during the times of the Russian Empire and Soviet Union the policy of Latvianization was embedded in the Constitution of Latvia, Article 24, which says in part: "The state ensures the development of state policy, including scientific research, protection and teaching of Latvian, promoting the increase of the role of Latvian in the national economy, as well as promoting individual and public understanding of the language as a national value."

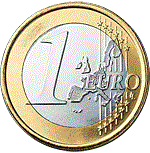
Viens eiro

In the 21st century some groups and government organizations (Terminology Commission of the Latvian Academy of Science and the State Language Center) work to counter the influence of Russian and English. As a notable example, the Latvian government insisted on the Latvianized word eiro for "euro" (from the Latvian word for Europe: "Eiropa") despite the pressure from the EU. Others, such as linguist Andrejs Veisbergs, object to the excessive language purism.

=== Latvian names ===
The official records of Latvian names were often variously forcibly assimilated into the foreign culture dominant at times in Latvian lands. For example, local pastors, who were often of German descent, used to issue marriage and birth certificates with Germanized names: e.g., Kalns was written as Berg (both meaning "mountain" in Latvian and German respectively).

On December 21, 1939, the Cabinet of Ministers adopted the "Law on change of surnames" (Likums par uzvārdu maiņu), with the intent of giving Latvians a possibility to change the names of German coinage into the names in Latvian style. Article 2 of the law stated that when changing surnames, "Citizens of Latvian nationality should choose only Latvian surnames. Non-Latvians cannot choose Latvian surnames." Many of these changed names were in fact translations from German into Latvian, e.g., Altbergs (Altberg, "old mountain") > Veckalns; Veisbergs (Weisberg, "white mountain") > Baltkalns; Rozenfelds (Rosenfeld, "rose field") > Rožlauks; Grīnbergs (Grünberg) > Zaļkalns, etc. Sometimes "de-Germanization" produced a slightly different name, e.g., Daugmants was Germanized as Daugmann and then de-Germanized into Daugmanis. Demographer Ilmārs Mežs has estimated that nowadays around a third of all the Latvian surnames are of German origin.

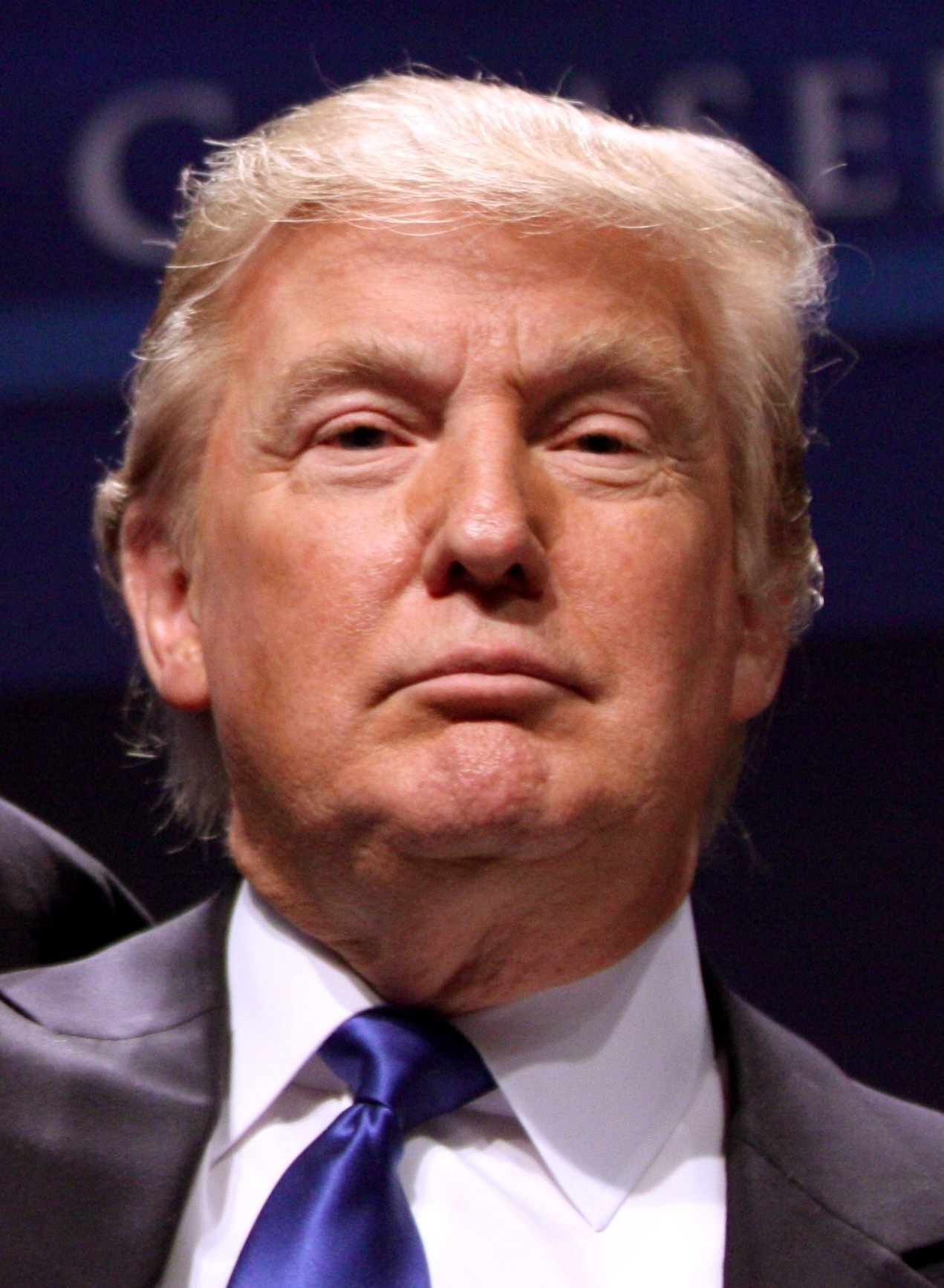
Donalds Tramps

The modern Latvian law, basically follows the norms established in 1920s-1930s. After the discussions of the Linguistic Commission, the 1927 "Law on writing names and surnames in Latvian passports" was adopted by the Saeima, followed by governmental regulations to enact it. By the modern law, Latvian names should conform to the phonetic Latvian orthography and the fusional Latvian grammar, and in the case of foreign-born Latvian nationals or marriages between Latvian women and foreigners (whence they assume the family name of their husband) the foreign names are modified to conform to the phonetic spelling and to acquire the respective case ending. For example, Gerard Depardieu is Žerārs Depardjē, Ivan Ivanov is Ivans Ivanovs, Joaquin Phoenix is Hoakins Fīnikss and Donald Trump is Donalds Tramps. Russian-style patronymics are not considered part of the official Latvian personal name (Ioakim Ioakimovich Vatsetis > Jukums Vācietis).

== Politics ==
Kārlis Ulmanis during his authoritarian rule openly promoted the removal of the ethnic minorities (in fact, Latvian Jews) from economic life and of giving the ethnic Latvians access to all positions in the national economy. This was sometimes referred to as "Lettization". Alfrēds Birznieks, the minister of agriculture, in a speech delivered in Ventspils on 26 January 1936, said:

Latvian people are the only masters of this country; Latvians will themselves promulgate the laws and judge for themselves what justice is.

Another aspect of the Lettization policy was the Lettization of towns and small towns (shtetls) with the aim of reducing the political weight of the urban minorities in them. One method was expanding their municipal boundaries, to incorporate rural population into them. Another method was to include the nearby military garrisons into the lists of municipal voters.
