= Wessberg =

Wessberg is a surname. Notable people with the surname include:

- Linda Wessberg (born 1980), Swedish golfer
- Wes Wessberg (born 1939), American cyclist

== See also ==
- Weisberg
