= Altberg (surname) =

Altberg is a German-language surname. A Latvianized version: Altbergs. Notable people with the surname include:

- Alexandre Altberg (1908–2009), Brazilian architect
- Erik Altberg, birth name of Eric Barclay, Swedish film actor
- Jonas Erik Altberg, better known as Basshunter, Swedish singer, record producer, songwriter and DJ
- Marco Altberg (born 1953), Brazilian screenwriter and film director
- Wihlhelm Altberg (1877–1942), Russian physicist

== See also ==
- Altenberg (disambiguation)
