= Weisberg =

Weisberg, a variant of Weissberg, is a German surname. It derives from Weiss or Weiß (German for "white") and Berg (German for "mountain"). People with the surname include:

- Arthur Weisberg, (1931–2009), American instrumentalist and composer
- Charles Weisberg (born 1947), American forger
- Harold Weisberg, American author
- Herman Weisberg (born 1966), American private investigator and security consultant
- Jacob Weisberg (born 1964), American political journalist
- Lois Weisberg (1925–2016), Commissioner of Cultural Affairs for Chicago
- Michael Weisberg (born 1976), American philosopher and professor
- Richard H. Weisberg, American law professor
- Robert Weisberg, American lawyer and law professor
- Steve Weisberg (born 1963), American recording artist and composer
- Tim Weisberg (born 1943), American musical artist

== See also ==
- Lauren Weisberger (born 1977), American author
- Shatzi Weisberger (1930–2022), American activist and retired nurse
