= Ivanovs =

Ivanovs is the Latvianized form of the surname Ivanov. The feminine form, Ivanova, is the same in Latvian and Russian. The surname may refer to the following notable people:

- Ņikita Ivanovs
- Jānis Ivanovs
- Valērijs Ivanovs
- Deniss Ivanovs
- Sergejs Ivanovs
