= Altenberg =

Altenberg (German for "old mountain" or "mountain of the old") may refer to:

== Places ==
=== Austria ===
- Altenberg, a town in Sankt Andrä-Wördern, Tulln District
- Altenberg bei Linz, in Upper Austria
- Altenberg an der Rax, in Styria

=== Germany ===
- Altenberg (Bergisches Land), an area in Odenthal, North Rhine-Westphalia
  - Altenberg Abbey, Cistercian monastery in Altenberg (Bergisches Land)
    - Altenberger Dom, sometimes called Altenberg Cathedral, the former church of this Cistercian monastery
- Altenberg (Hohenahr), hill in Hesse
- Altenberg (Limpurg Hills), highest summit in the Limpurg Hills
- Altenberg, Saxony, a town
- Altenberga, a municipality in the Saale-Holzfeld district, Thuringia
- Altenberg Abbey, Solms, a former Premonstratensian nunnery near Wetzlar in Hesse
- Zinkfabrik Altenberg, a former zinc factory, now a branch of the LVR Industrial Museum, Oberhausen, North Rhine-Westphalia
- Grube Altenberg, a show mine near Kreuztal, North Rhine-Westphalia

=== Other places ===
- Altenberg, the German name for Vieille Montagne (old mountain in French), a former zinc mine in Kelmis, Moresnet, Belgium
- Altenberg, a district in the city of Bern, Switzerland

== Other uses ==
- Altenberg Lieder (Five Orchestral Songs), composed by Alban Berg in 1911/12
- Altenberg Publishing (1880–1934), a former Polish publishing house
- Altenberg Trio, a Viennese piano trio

== People with the surname ==
- Alfred Altenberg (1878–1924), Polish bookseller and publisher
- Jakob Altenberg (1875–1944), Austrian businessman
- Lee Altenberg, theoretical biologist
- Peter Altenberg (1859–1919), nom de plume of Austrian writer and poet Richard Engländer

== See also ==
- Altenburg (disambiguation)
