= Latvian =

Latvian may refer to:

- Something of, from, or related to Latvia
  - Latvians, a Baltic ethnic group, native to what is modern-day Latvia and the immediate geographical region
  - Latvian language, also referred to as Lettish
  - Latvian cuisine
  - Latvian culture
  - Latvian horse
- Latvian Gambit, an opening in chess

== See also ==
- Latvia (disambiguation)
