= Altenburg (Heroldsbach) =

- Heroldsbach-Flur "Altenburg"
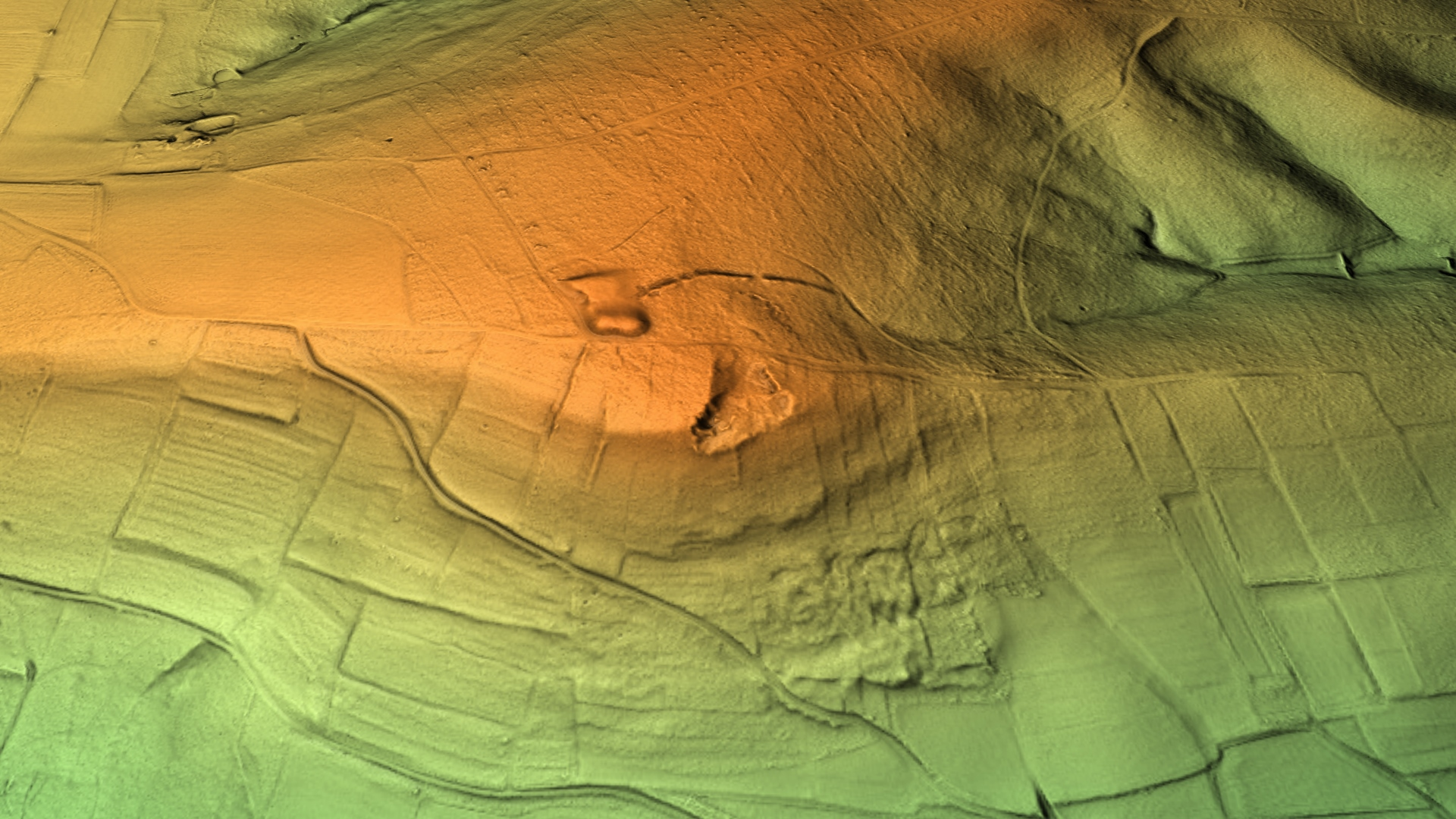

Site information
- Type: Wallburg
- Code: DE-BY
- Condition: burgstall, rampart and ditch remains

Location
- Coordinates: 49°41′55″N 10°59′24″E
- Height: 362 m above sea level (NHN)

Site history
- Built: Early Middle Ages

The Altenburg fortification (German: Abschnittsbefestigung Altenburg) near Heroldsbach is a levelled early medieval fortified position at a height of 362 m above sea level (NHN), about 850 metres northwest of the church in Heroldsbach in the Upper Franconian county of Forchheim in the south German state of Bavaria. No historical or archaeological information is available for this sector fortification, but pottery finds from the interior of the site date to the Early Middle Ages. All that has survived is a double rampart system with a ditch. The site is protected by the state of Bavaria as monument number D-4-6331-0001: Frühmittelalterliche Abschnittsbefestigung "Altenburg".

== Description ==
The fortification lies on the southeastern edge of a broad, east-west oriented hill ridge in the forested area of Altenburg. The east and south sides of the site drop fairly steeply to the valley floor of the Hirtenbach stream which lies at around 80 metres above sea level. To the west of the fortifications is a terrain saddle. The north side transitions almost on the level into the hill ridge. The two vulnerable sides, in the west and north, were protected by what is now a very low semi-circular rampart guarded by a ditch. The western end of the rampart transitions into a step in the terrain on the hillside. The rampart still has a height of up to 1.3 metres and a width of five metres; the ditch is the same width. The height difference between the floor of the ditch and crest of the rampart is 1.7 metres. About 25 metres behind the rampart, a second parallel stone rampart was built; it too is very low today. The inner rampart has no visible link to the outer one at the edge of the defensive position. In the west and north there are gaps in the rampart; the ditch has also been levelled at these points. These entry points have probably been created relatively recently.

The interior of the 170 by 150 metre site descends towards the south and is interrupted by sandpits in places. In the east and south, low terrain steps or terraces can be made out.

== Literature ==
- Björn-Uwe Abels: Führer zu archäologischen Denkmälern in Bayern, Franken Band 2: Archäologischer Führer Oberfranken. Konrad Theiss Verlag, Stuttgart, 1986, ISBN 3-8062-0373-3, p. 141.
- Denis André Chevalley (1986). "Oberfranken". In Michael Petzet, Bayerisches Landesamt für Denkmalpflege [in German] (ed.). Denkmäler in Bayern : Ensembles, Baudenkmäler, archäologische Geländedenkmäler [Monuments in Bavaria: ensembles, monuments, archaeological site memorials]. Denkmäler in Bayern (in German). Vol. IV (Various ed.). München: Oldenbourg. ISBN 3-486-52395-3.
- Klaus Schwarz: Die vor- und frühgeschichtlichen Geländedenkmäler Oberfrankens. (Materialhefte zur bayerischen Vorgeschichte, Series B, Vol. 5). Verlag Michael Lassleben, Kallmünz, 1955, p. 90.
