= Altenburg (Bamberg) =

Castle in Bavaria, Germany

Coordinates: 49.881°N 10.869°E

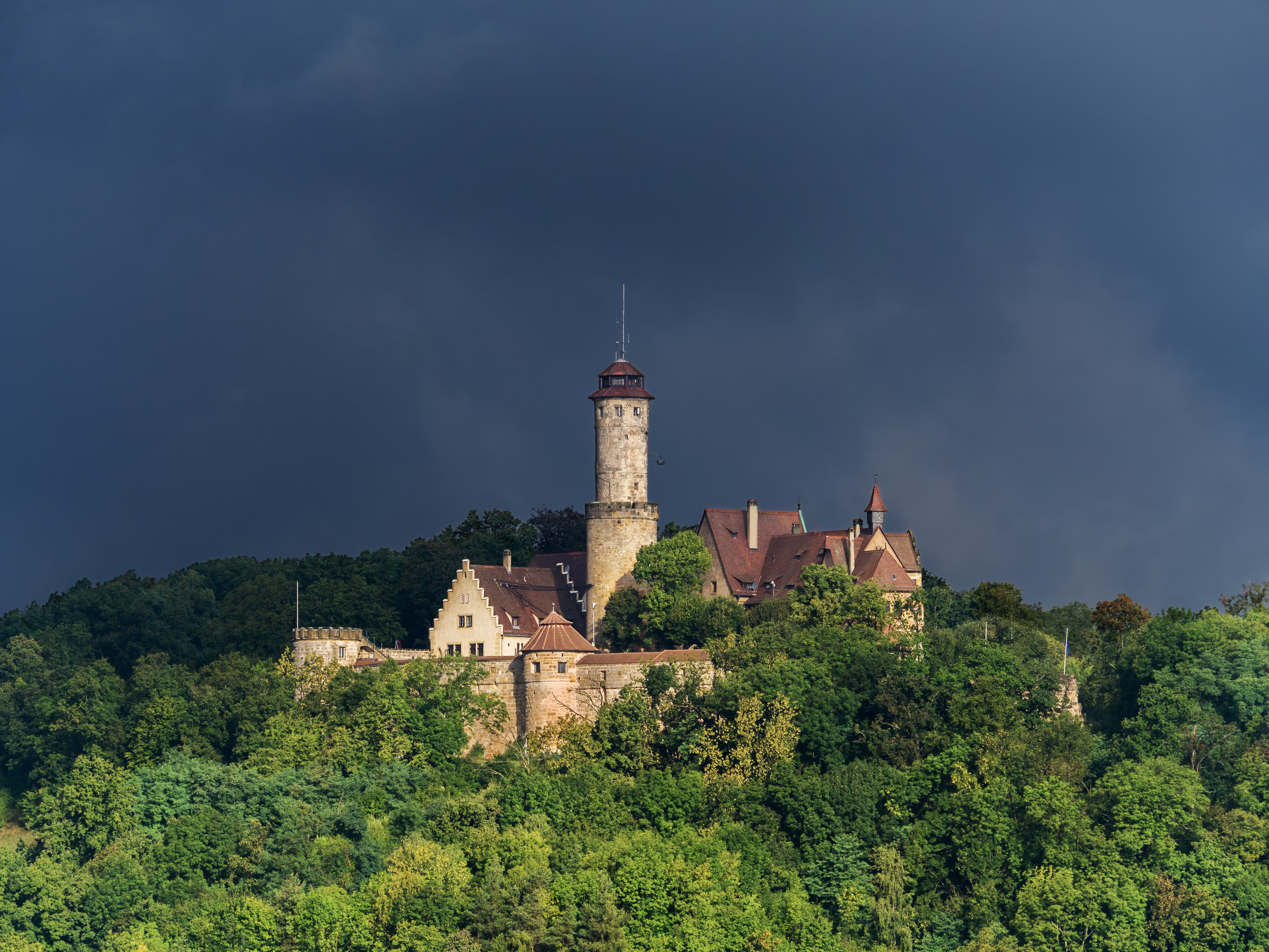
- Altenburg Castle, seen from the East
- Interactive map of the Altenburg area

General information
- Type: Hill castle
- Location: Bamberg, Germany

The Altenburg is a castle that sits on the tallest of the seven hills of Bamberg, southern Germany, overlooking the town. It is located in Upper Franconia, a region in the state of Bavaria, and dates back to at least 1109.

== History ==
The first mention of the Altenburg was in 1109. Its name, meaning "old castle", suggests that it was already considered old at that time; its origins may predate the year 1000.

In 1109 the castle was church property belonging to the collegiate chapter of St James and had little military significance. Only from the late 14th century onwards did the prince-bishops develop it into a fortified residence above the town.

A charter of 1251 placed the castle in the temporary custody of Bishop Heinrich I of Bilversheim for four months only; the collegiate chapter of St James remained its owner. Effective control by the prince-bishops began around 1307, and from then until 1553 the castle served as their second residence.

In 1553, during the Second Margrave War, the army of Albert Alcibiades, Margrave of Brandenburg-Kulmbach forced the castle's surrender and burned its residential buildings; the keep, the curtain walls and the core of the gatehouse survived, and the gatehouse was rebuilt in 1554–1556 under Bishop Weigand von Redwitz. After the bishops moved to Geyerswörth Palace in 1586, the ruined castle served for a time as a state prison.

In 1801, the Bamberg physician Adalbert Friedrich Marcus bought part of the decaying castle for 400 gulden and made the surviving gatehouse habitable as a summer retreat, saving the complex from demolition; a systematic restoration was carried out only from 1818 onwards by the Altenburgverein. The author E. T. A. Hoffmann, a friend of Marcus, sought recreation in one of the wall towers during his Bamberg years (1808–1813).

In 1818, Bamberg citizens founded a society for the preservation of the Altenburg and purchased the castle for 4,800 gulden. The society, today known as the Altenburgverein, was initiated by the royal postmaster Anton von Grafenstein.

From 1952 to 1982, a brown bear named Poldi – regarded as the last castle bear in Germany – lived in a Zwinger (an enclosure) at the castle. The Zwinger still exists but today contains only a bear display figure; Poldi's preserved head is on show at the Natural History Museum in Bamberg.

== Architecture ==
=== Keep ===
The castle's most prominent feature is its round keep (German: Bergfried), noted for its barrel-like shape (Butterfassturm). Its core was built around 1400–1414 under Prince-Bishop Albrecht von Wertheim. In 1743, Prince-Bishop Friedrich Karl von Schönborn had an upper storey added by the architect Johann Jakob Michael Küchel, and the present onion dome was added in 1902 by the Bamberg architect Gustav Haeberle.

=== Palas ===
The present Palas, which houses the Knights' Hall (Rittersaal) and the restaurant, is a historicising building erected in 1901–02 on the medieval cellars of the original residential block. It was designed by Gustav Haeberle and financed largely by the shoe manufacturer Heinrich Manz.

=== Chapel ===
The castle chapel occupies a room with a late-Gothic vault dating to around 1450. Originally a secular utility room, it was converted into a neo-Gothic chapel in 1834–35 and consecrated in 1836.

== Geology and landslides ==
The castle hill consists of sandstone resting on landslide-prone clay. Slippages have repeatedly damaged the castle: in 1750 much of the eastern curtain wall was lost, and around 1778–80 a slide at the north-eastern corner brought down parts of the north and east walls. The eastern wall was rebuilt in exposed concrete only in the early 21st century (2002).

== Current use ==
Today, the castle is open for public tours. Since 2025 the castle has again housed a restaurant, "Altenburg 1", run by Robin Guevara Perez. The restaurant also manages the so-called Knights Hall, used mostly for events such as weddings or other celebrations.

== Gallery ==
Altenburg

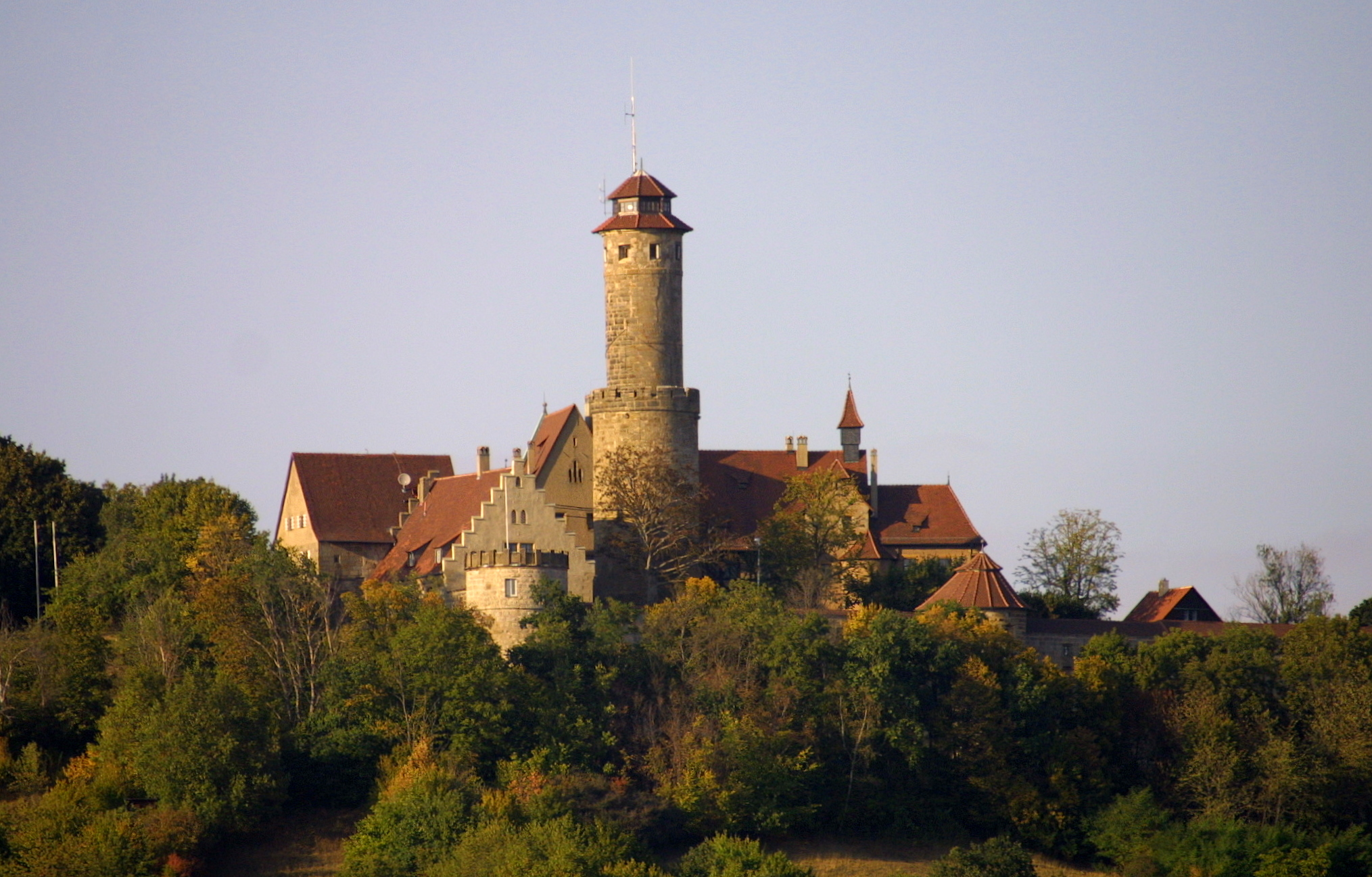
Seen from the South

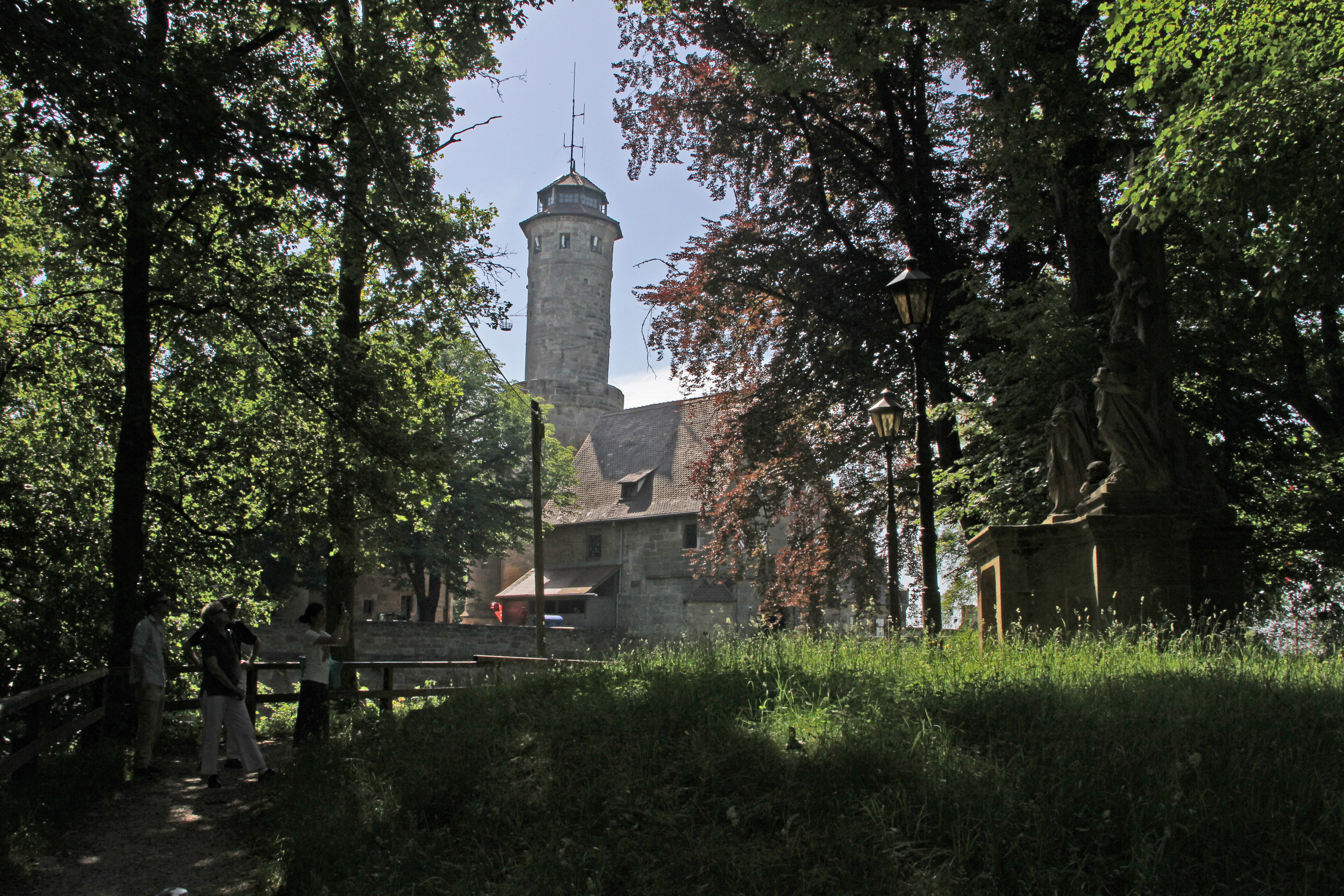

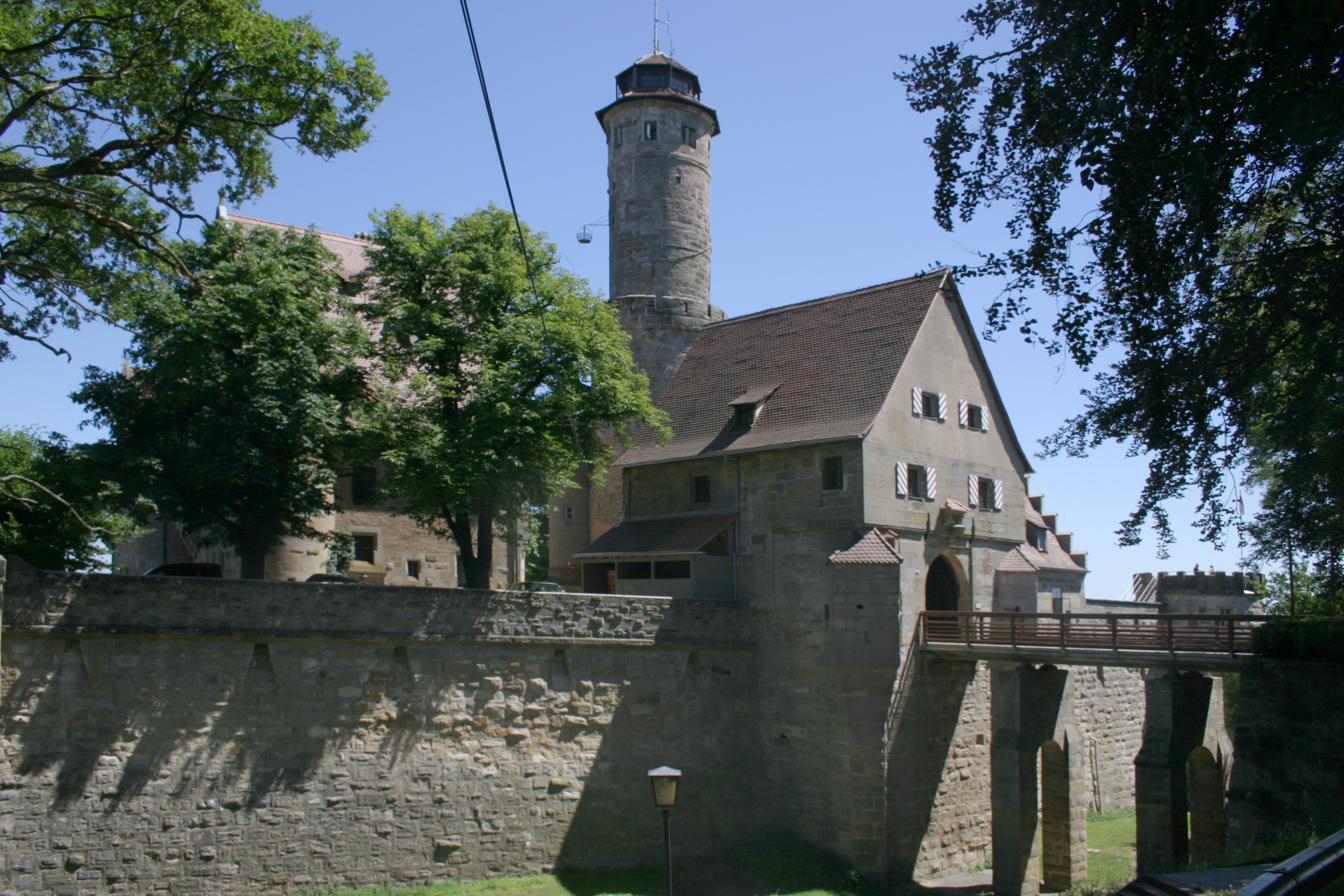

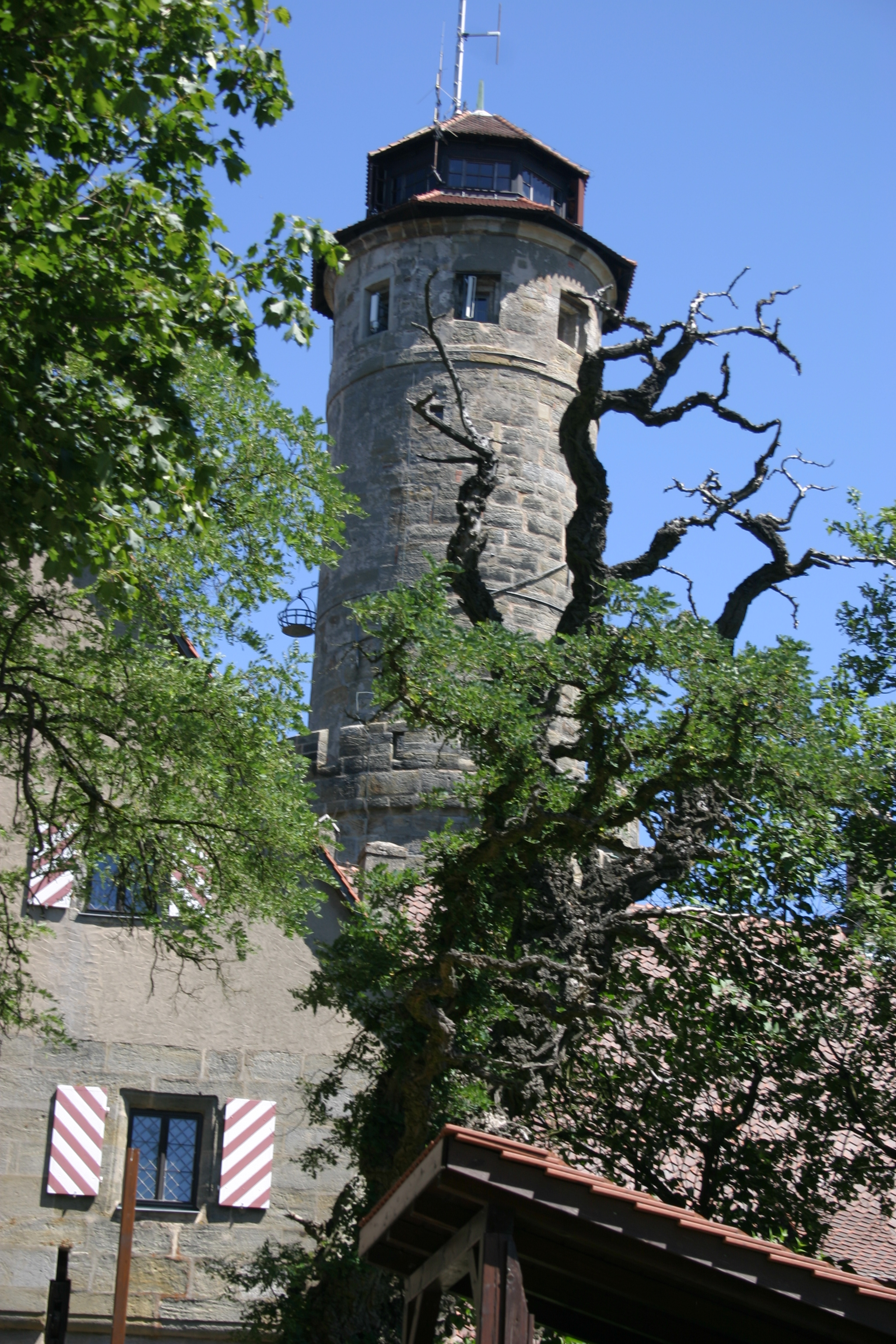

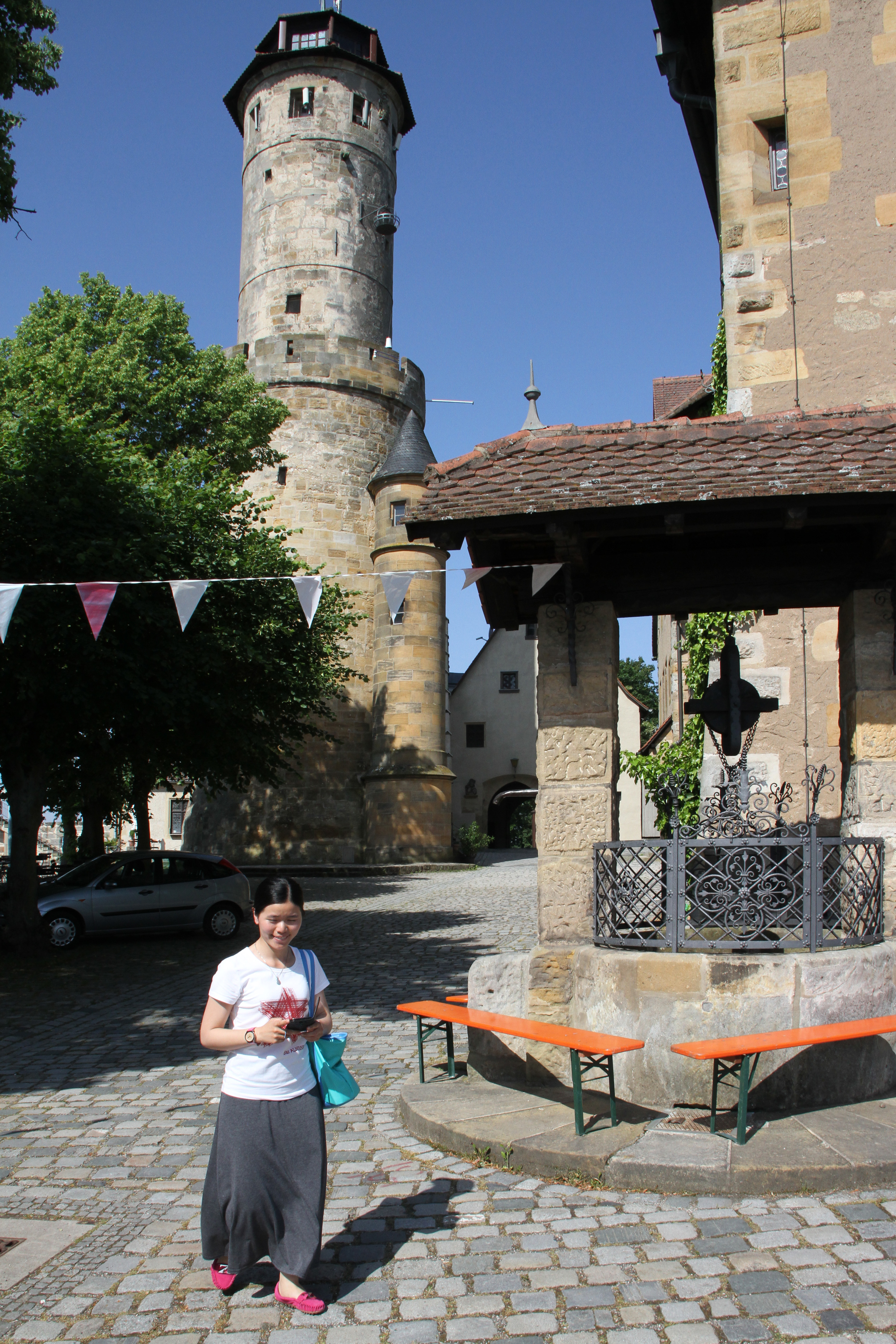
