= Alte Burg (Langenenslingen) =

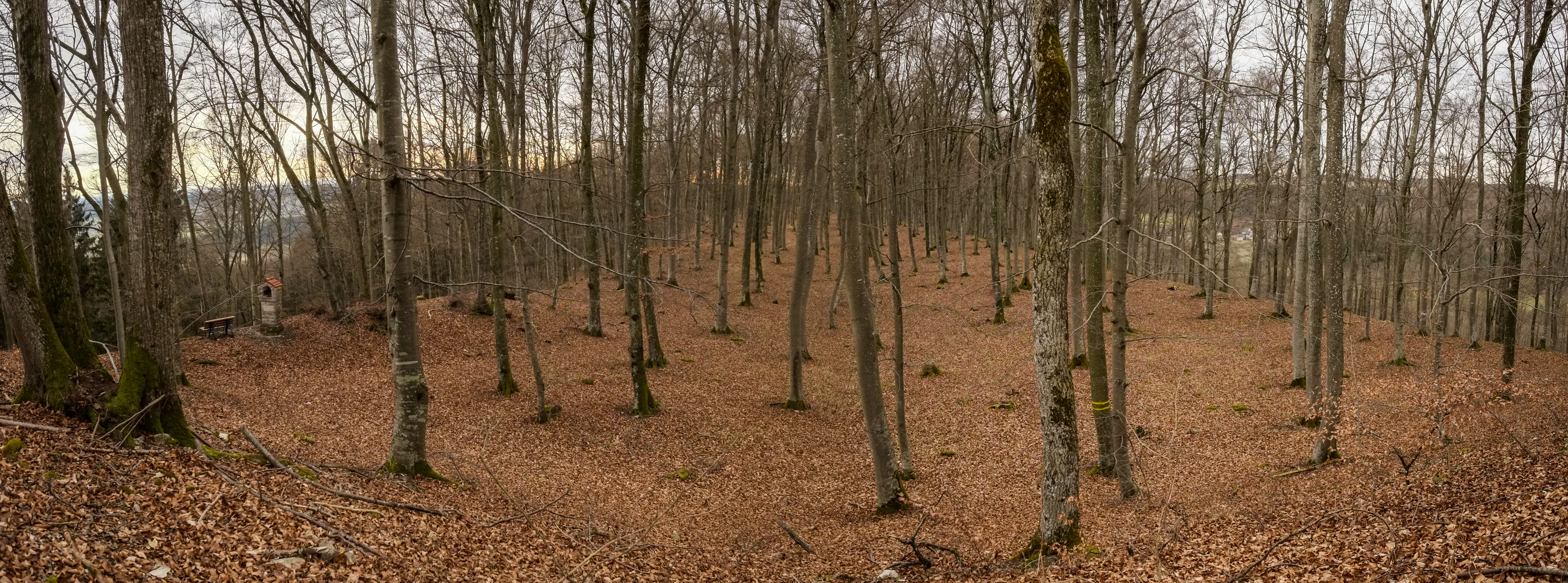
- The plateau of Alte Burg

- Location within Germany
- 48.162°N 9.3475°E
- Type: Hillfort possibly with religious purpose
- Periods: Iron Age
- Cultures: Hallstatt culture, early La Tène
- Location: near Langenenslingen, Baden-Württemberg
- Region: Germany

History
- Built by: Celts

Site notes
- Material: stone, earth
- Public access: Yes

Alte Burg is a large Celtic hilltop fortification, or hillfort, that may have been used as a cult or assembly site for the regional population. It is located 9 kilometers from a major settlement of the Hallstatt and early La Tène period, the Heuneburg. Alte Burg lies in the municipality of Langenenslingen in Baden-Württemberg, Germany.

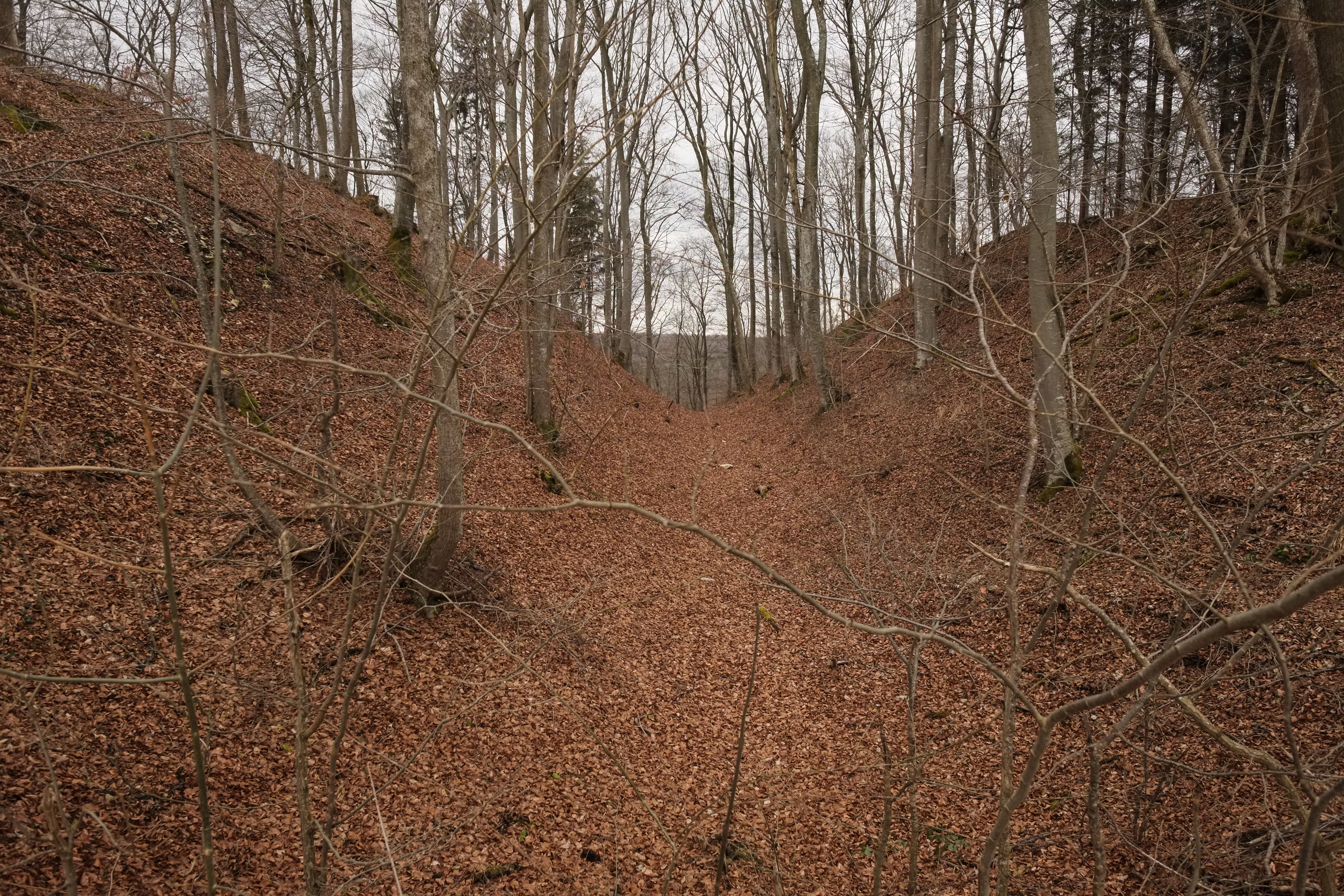
From left: main rampart, moat, middle rampart

== Geography ==
=== Location ===
The Alte Burg lies on a long spur of the hill Burgberg, at an elevation of around 695 m above NN, at the southern edge of the Swabian Jura. It is located almost 3 kilometers north west of Langenenslingen. The Heuneburg, a major settlement of the Hallstatt period overlooking the Danube, is about 9 kilometers to the south east. Another hillfort, Große Heuneburg, lies to the north east.

== History ==
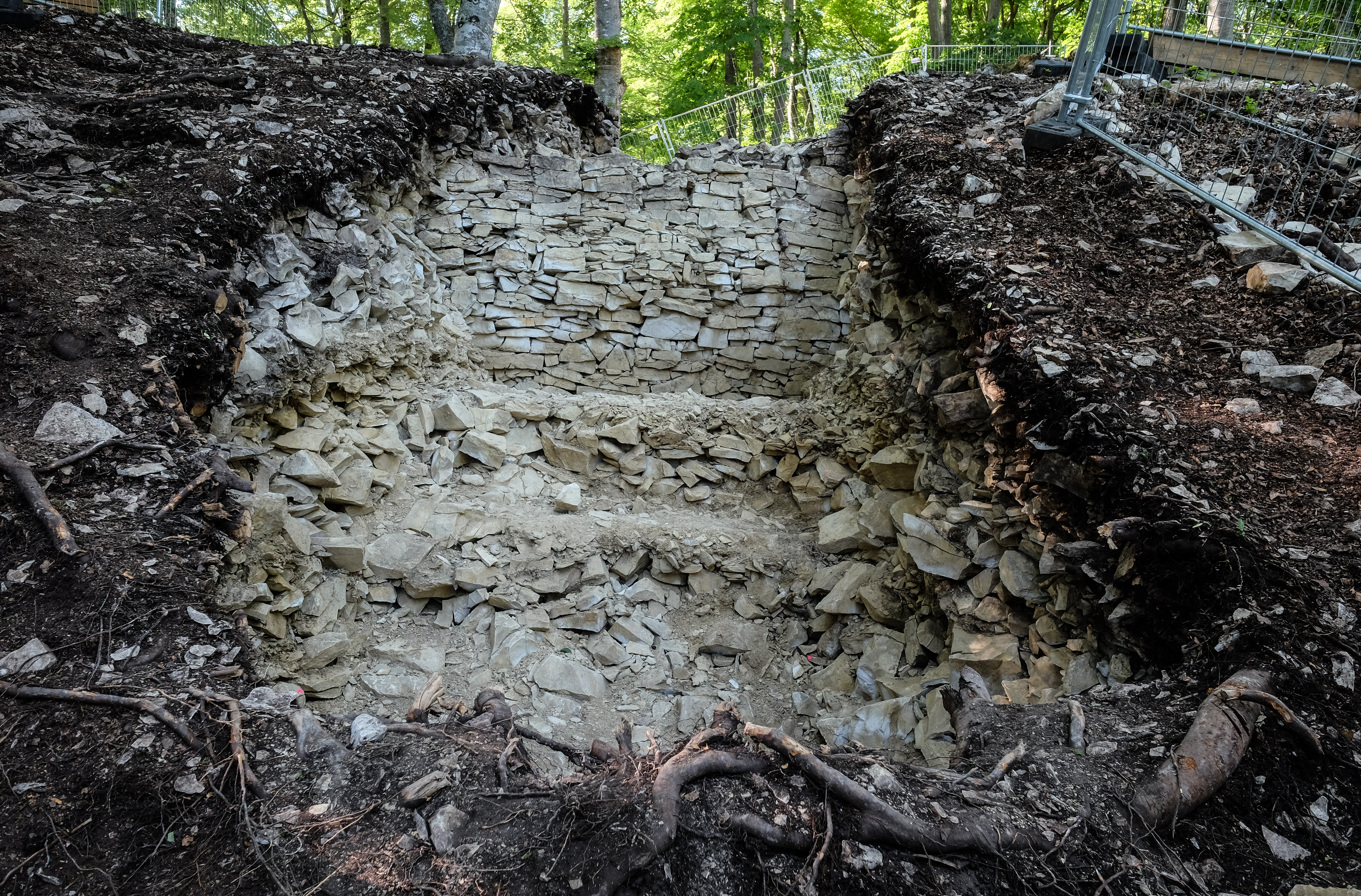
Remains of dry stone walling

The remains were originally interpreted in a medieval context, as the border between Langenenslingen and Emerfeld, and between Württemberg and Hohenzollern followed the central wall.

In 1894, an excavation was conducted that discovered the pit (see below) which was interpreted as a burial mound. A modern excavation followed in 2006/7 and discovered bone fragments that were dated to the 3rd or 4th century BC. Excavations have been resumed in 2014 and are ongoing.

== Description ==
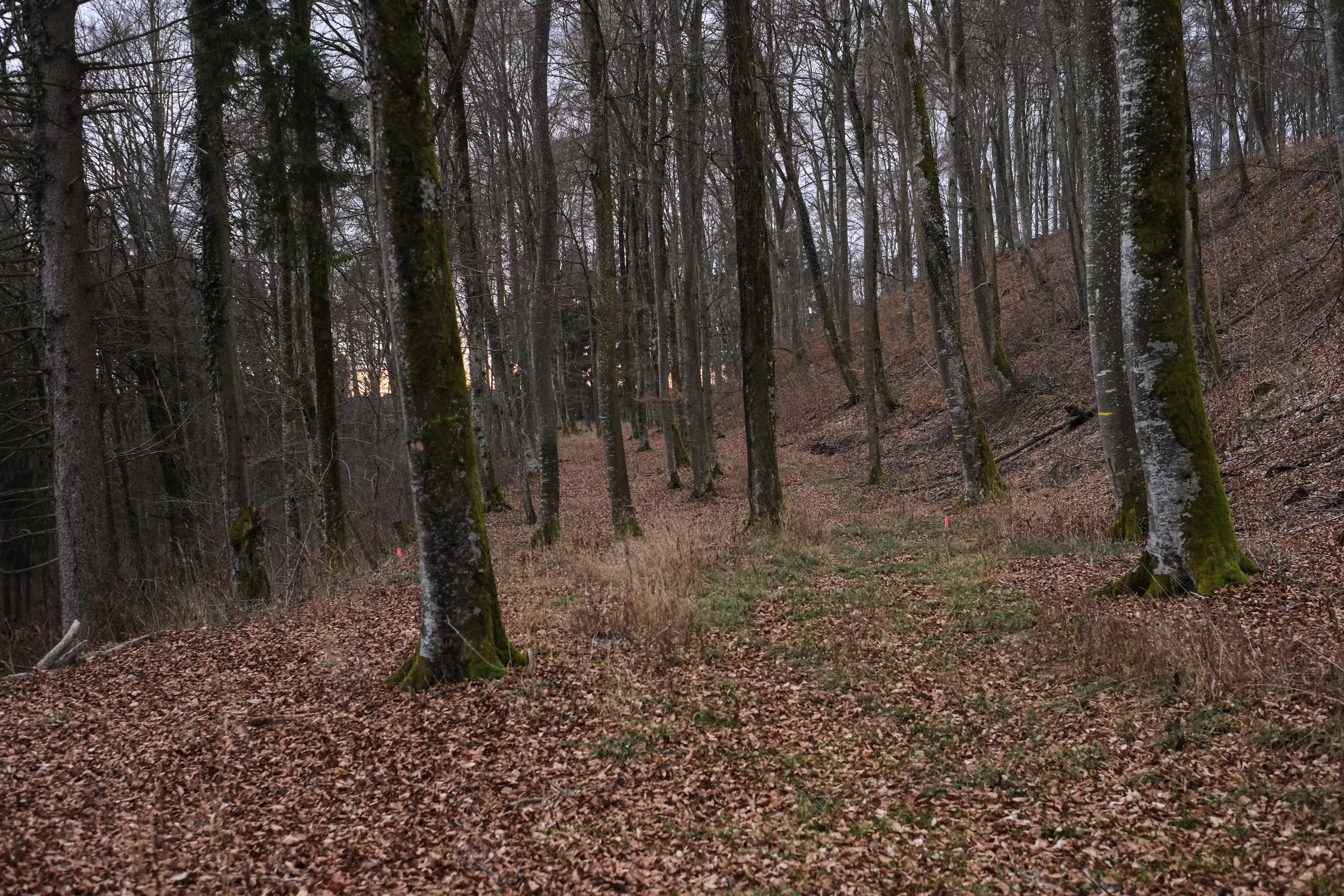
Southeastern terrace

The tongue-shaped plateau of around 2 hectares is closed off towards the north east by two exterior ramparts, a deep moat and a large main rampart. Even today, the top of the main rampart is up to 12 meters above the bottom of the moat. Towards the valley the plateau is flanked by two terraces, 15 (north west) and 20 meters (south east) below the top. At the bottom of the slope another rampart and moat surround the hill. The entry to the fort was likely to the north east.

The plateau had been increased in size by the construction of dry stone walls that were then filled with rubble (stone and clay). Small stone walls on top of the plateau were built, with one cutting across the plateau in the centre, thus dividing the level area in two halves. This was the line later followed by the municipal border.

The main wall to the northeast was 13 meters thick and at least 10 meters high. It consisted of an external and internal dry stone wall with rubble filling in between. This wall was linked to another of around 40 meters length and around 5.8 meters thickness that radiated away towards the north east. It is likely that there was a gate at that point controlling access to the plateau.

The main wall has been dated to the 7th to 5th century BC. It is the largest known construction of this type from the period in question north of the Alps.

The outer rampart (of rubble and clay) was up to 2 meters high and around 18 meters thick and had no moat. The middle rampart, located on the exterior side of the moat, was at least 1.8 meters high and was built mainly from limestone.

The central pit was dug around 5 meters deep into the limestone plateau. It is surrounded by a type of stone ledge or bank. Inside this pit the 1894 excavation discovered six human skeletons.

Findings mostly date from the Hallstatt period. Some metal items from the pit area are early La Tène. Later deposits include Medieval pottery. A single Urnfield culture, i.e. pre-Celtic, pin has been found.

The plateau and the ramparts are now partially covered by trees.

== Interpretation ==
There is no evidence of houses. Another large settlement so close to Heuneburg is also deemed unlikely and the pit points to some form of cult activity. Thus the Alte Burg is thought to have probably served as a cult site to the sizeable Hallstadt period population of the area, possibly also as a place where assemblies and/or games and contests took place.

The original reading of the pit as a burial site is now discounted as no burial objects have been found. Given this arrangement, a use of the pit in some form of cult, as a sacrificial pit, is now considered to be the likeliest interpretation.

In 2022 historical archeologist Karen Bellinger discussed the possibility of the mound being a proto-hippodrome, given the similarity in nearby structures to mediterranean architecture, she posited the possibility that a Greco-Roman architect may have witnessed the structure and brought the idea back to southern Europe.

== Gallery ==
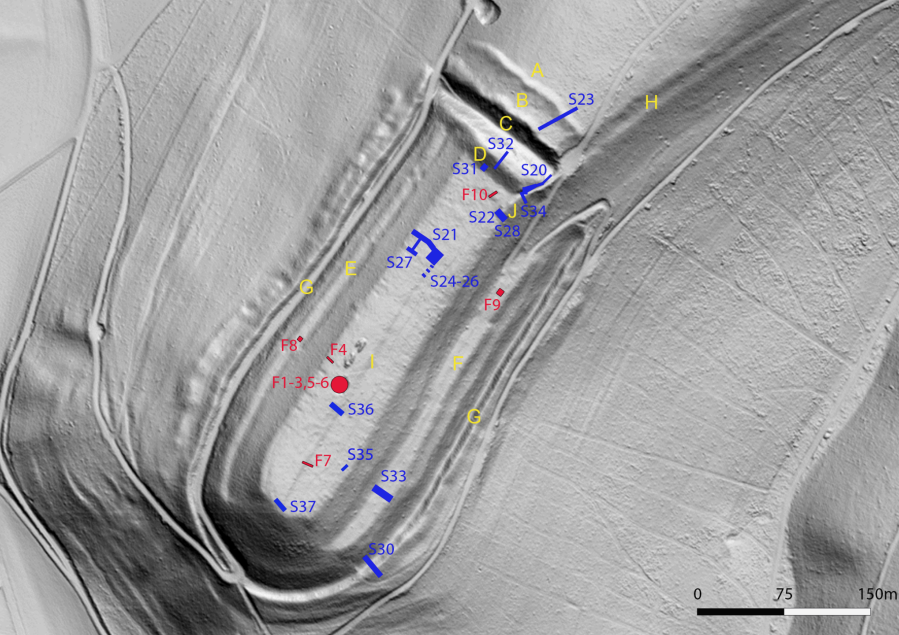
Digital terrain model of the Alte Burg

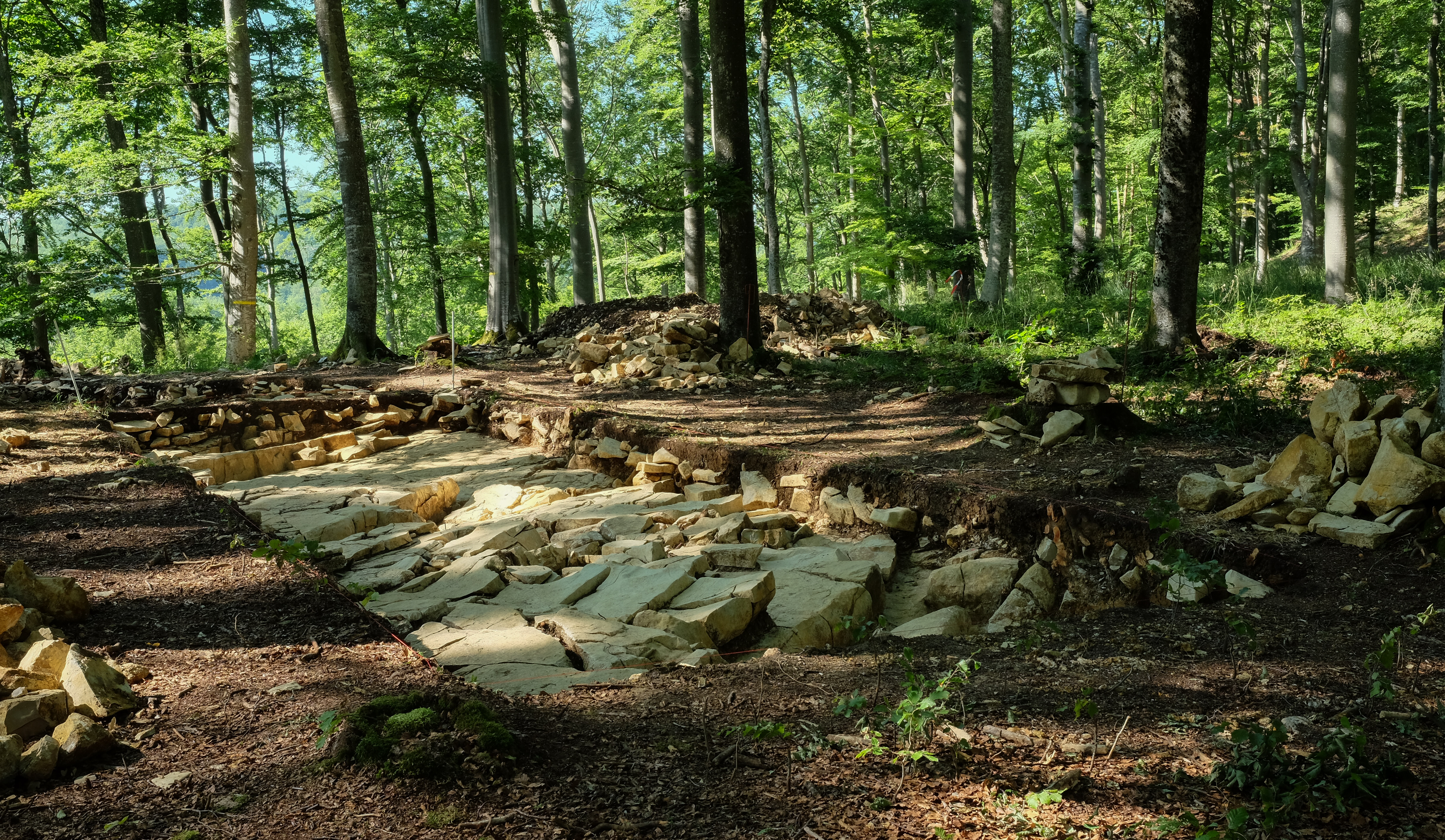

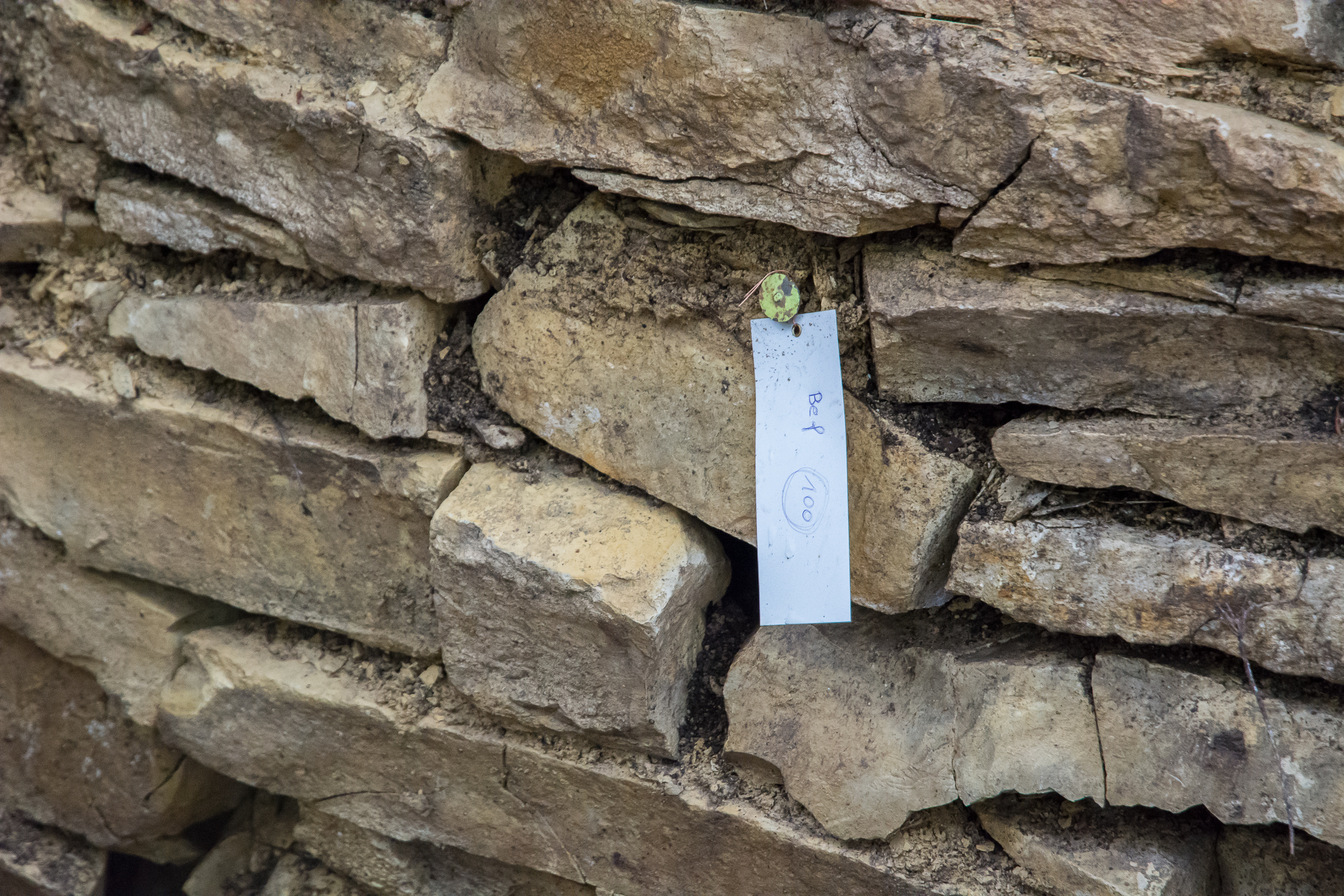

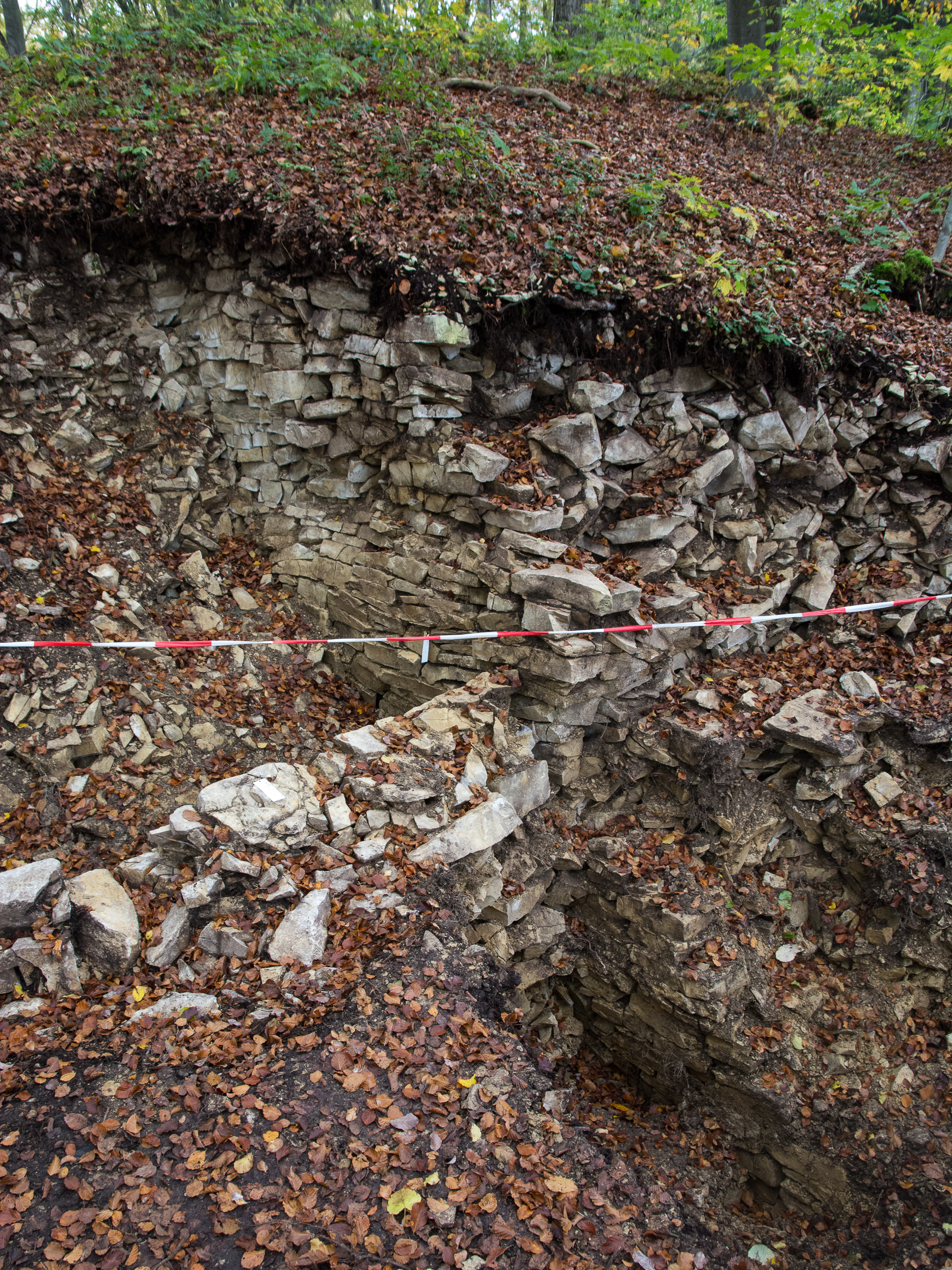

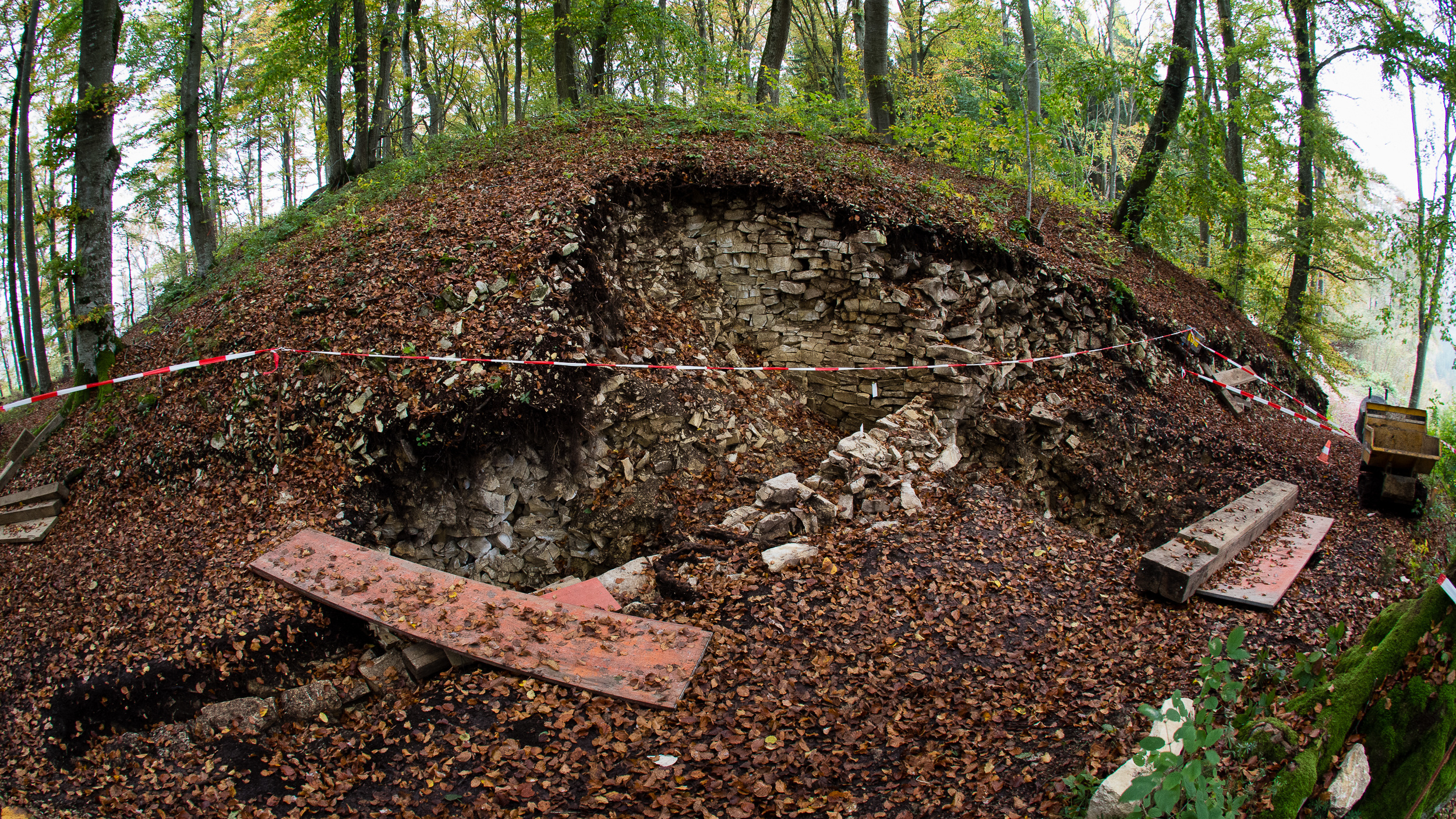

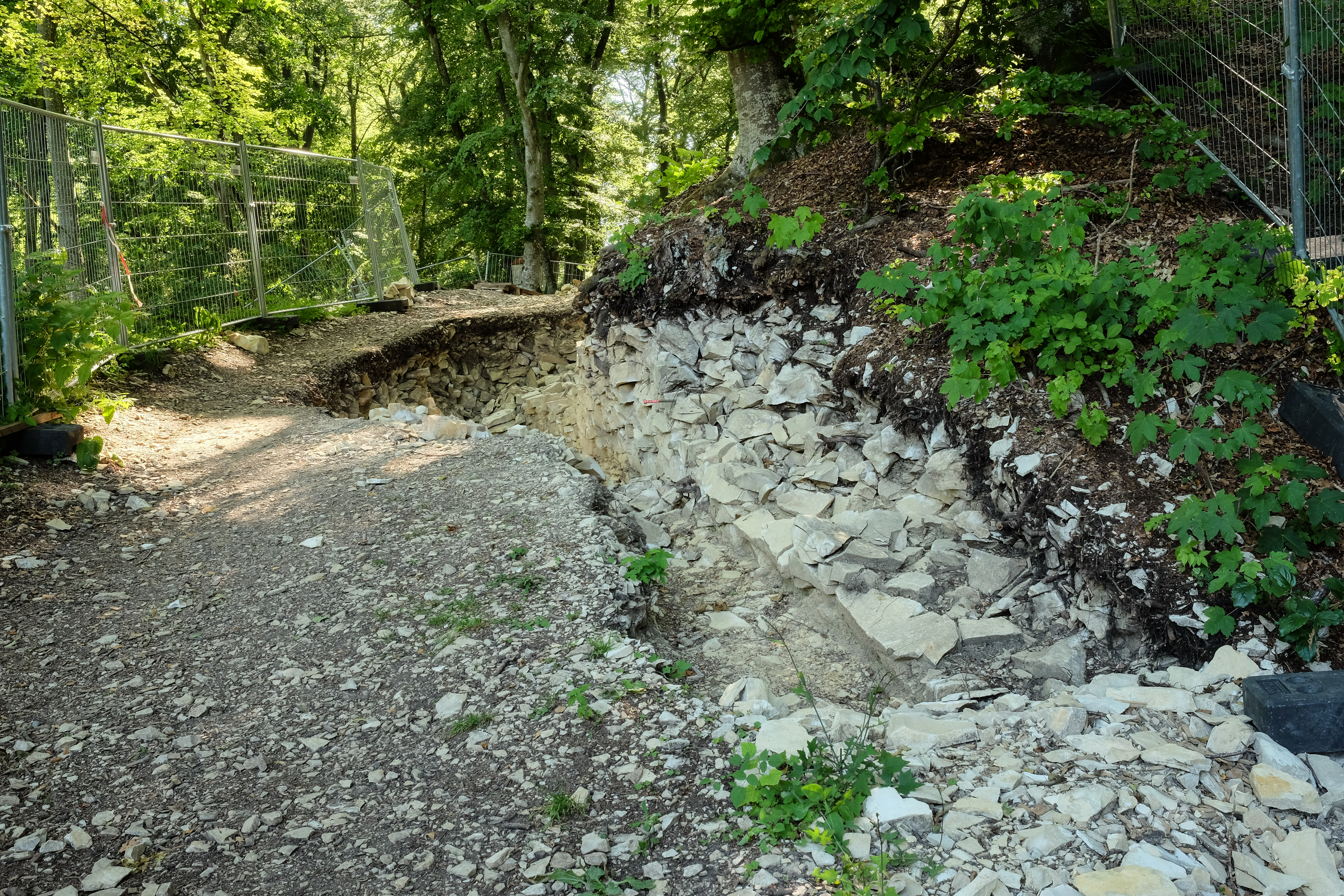

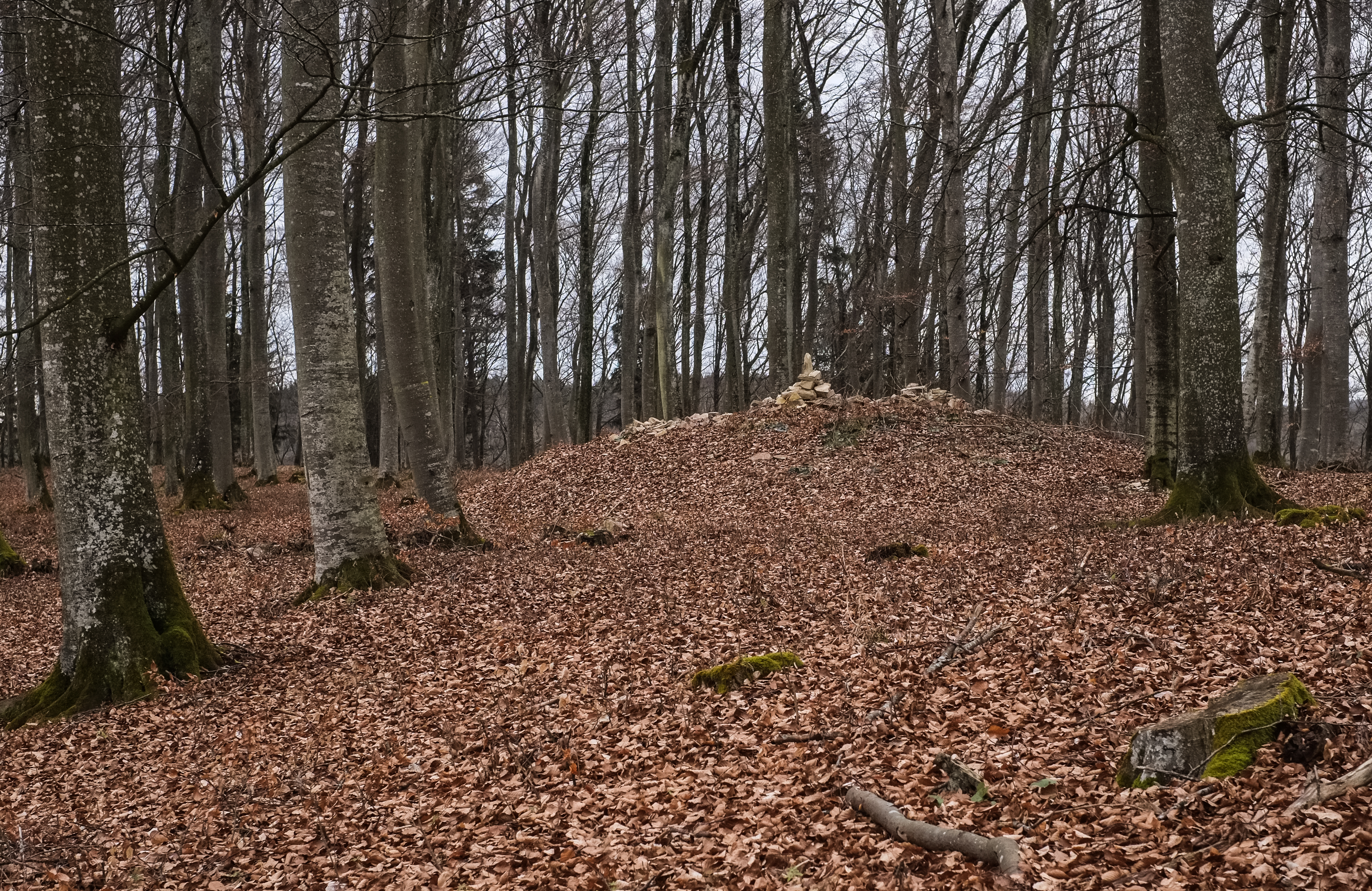
Stone sill around the pit

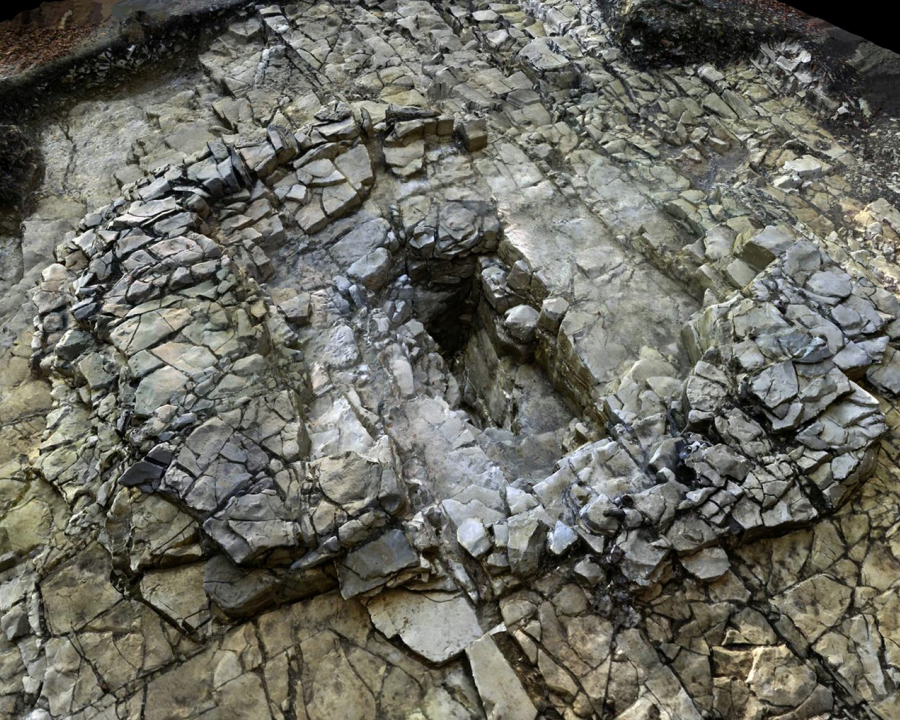
View into the Alte Burg shaft
