= Old Castle (Demmingen) =

Alte Burg
- Dischingen-Demmingen

Site information
- Type: hill castle
- Code: DE-BW
- Condition: burgstall (no above-ground ruins)

Location
- Coordinates: 48°40′12″N 10°25′03″E
- Height: 515 m above sea level (NN)

Site history
- Built: 13th C

The Old Castle (Alte Burg) is a demolished hill castle on an almost circular conical hill at a height of 515 m above sea level (NN) southwest of the village of Demmingen in the municipality of Dischingen in the county of Heidenheim in the German state of Baden-Württemberg.

The castle was built in the 13th century by the counts of Dillingen, but later went to the lords of Hürnheim and then the Fugger counts. The castle was destroyed before 1551 and was torn down between 1570 and 1572.

The castle had a 6.6 X 10.3 metre tower house with a wall thickness of 1.72 metres.

== Literature ==
- Günter Schmitt: Burgenführer Schwäbische Alb, Band 6 - Ostalb: Wandern und entdecken zwischen Ulm, Aalen und Donauwörth. Biberacher Verlagsdruckerei, Biberach an der Riß, 1995, ISBN 3-924489-74-2, pp. 63–66.
