= Alte Burg (Lommersdorf) =

German castle

- Lommersdorf

Site information
- Type: hill castle, spur castle
- Code: DE-NW
- Condition: Burgstall, few remains

Location
- Coordinates: 50°23′46″N 6°44′35″E
- Height: 431 m above sea level (NHN)

Site history
- Built: Middle Ages

Garrison information
- Occupants: Edelherren

The Alte Burg ("Old Castle") near Lommersdorf in the municipality of Blankenheim in the county of Euskirchen in the German state of North Rhine-Westphalia is a levelled mediaeval castle site.

The site lies about 900 metres north of the River Ahr, above the village of Ahrhütte in the valley of the Mühlenbach on the L 105 country road. On the east, the hillside drops rapidly from around 431 m above NHN at the castle to the foot of the hill at about 378 metres above sea level.

The spur castle, which covered a small area, probably goes back to the Late Middle Ages. According to Janssen, the two-part structure belongs to the "two-part motte group (Gruppe der zweiteiligen Motten). But its small size is unusual for the genre. On the small, conical hill, just four metres in diameter on a hilltop plateau, was most likely to have been a tower. In 1928, Wackenroder confirmed that there were still stone remains that pointed to a former wall. The site has not yet been investigated archaeologically, but there are now no wall remains or other solid remains to be seen.

A family, the von Lommersdorfs are recorded in deeds dating to 1455 and 1478 which mention a John of Lommersdorf. Whethere there is a connexion between him and the castle is not certain. The site may have been linked to the quarrying of brown iron ore, which was then smelted in the nearby ironworks.

== Literature ==
- Harald Herzog: Burgen und Schlösser, Geschichte und Typologie der Adelssitze im Kreis Euskirchen. Rheinland-Verlag. Cologne, 1989. ISBN 3-7927-1067-6. p. 378.
- Walter Janssen: Studien zur Wüstungsfrage im fränkischen Altsiedelland zwischen Rhein, Mosel und Eifelnordrand. (=Bonner Jahrbücher, Beiheft 35) Rheinland Verlag, Cologne, 1975, ISBN 3-7927-0207-X, Part II, pp. 73ff.
- Ernst Wackenroder: Die Kunstdenkmäler des Kreises Schleiden. (=Die Kunstdenkmäler der Rheinprovinz. Vol. 11, Part II). Schwann, 1932 (reprinted 1982 ISBN 3-590-32116-4). p. 239.
