= Alfred Altenberg =

Polish bookseller and publisher

Alfred Altenberg (1878 in Warsaw – May 8, 1924, in Lviv) was a Polish bookseller and publisher.

He worked in Lviv. In 1897 he took over the family business, Wydawnictwo Altenberga, from his father Herman (1848–1885), and ran the Herman Alternberg Book Store. He published numerous illustrated classics of Polish literature, reproductions of works of Artur Grottger, Szymon Askenazy, books about art and drama and a series of popular science knowledge and life books, amongst others.
