= Herman Weisberg =

American detective

- Born: June 1, 1966 (age 60); New York, New York
- Police career
- Department: New York City Police Department (NYPD)
- Branch: New York County District Attorney, (DANY)
- Service years: 1990–2010
- Rank: Former Detective Grade 2
- Badge no.: 5925
- Other work: Private Investigator

Herman Weisberg (born 1966) is an American private investigator and security consultant. He is known for handling high-end white-collar crime cases for New York's white-shoe firms. Prior to this, he was a New York City Police Department detective, serving as the top investigator under New York County District Attorney Robert M. Morgenthau.

The cases Weisberg investigates typically revolve around interpersonal disputes and blackmail. His specialization in sextortion cases has led various publications to refer to him as "The Mistress Whisperer."

== Career ==
=== New York City Police Department ===
Weisberg began his 20-year career with the New York City Police Department in the 1990s as a beat police officer in Queens. He took on various roles throughout his tenure, including working undercover on the NYPD's vice squad, serving as a narcotics investigator, and being part of the dignitary protection unit, where he was responsible for safeguarding visiting dignitaries such as Vice President Al Gore and President George W. Bush during their trips to New York.

Weisberg served as the top investigator under Robert M. Morgenthau, who held the position of New York County District Attorney for 34 years. During his tenure in the district attorney's office, Weisberg specialized in investigating extortions, financial crimes, and various other complex criminal cases. He also worked under District Attorney Cyrus Vance Jr. In 2002, Weisberg was the lead investigator in the $600 million fraud scandal of Tyco Corporation. In 2004, he investigated extortion plots against NBA player Carmelo Anthony and handled the prosecution of the four suspects charged with extorting Anthony for $3 million. Notably, in 2010, Weisberg's played a crucial role in solving the David Letterman blackmail case.

Weisberg left the NYPD in 2010.

=== Private investigator ===
Weisberg is managing director of Sage Intelligence, an investigate and security firm that focuses on cases including contractual violations in the finance sector, potential instances of underage individuals in escort services, and allegations of corporate espionage. The firm provides protection for a number of high-profile entertainment-industry figures.

In 2017, Weisberg located Russian fugitive Viktoria Nasyrova.

In 2018, Benjamin Brafman, lawyer for film producer Harvey Weinstein, hired Weisberg to investigate on behalf of his client. He received death threats for his involvement in the case.

Former prosecutor Jeremy Saland, with whom Weisberg has collaborated, has estimated that he and Weisberg had worked on around 200 sextortion cases since 2010, as of December 2022.

Weisberg's frequent handling of sextortion cases has led various publications, including The Washington Post and The Times, to refer to him as "The Mistress Whisperer." He has been described as "well-liked by prosecutors" and as a "tenacious investigator."

== Media ==
On television, Weisberg has appeared in "Red Notice for Murder," a 2017 episode of the CBS show 48 Hours. He was also featured in an episode of the ABC TV show 20/20. Weisberg returned to 48 Hours in Season 35, Episode 46 titled "The case of the Poison Cheesecake".
