= Latvia (disambiguation) =

Latvia is a country in Europe.

Latvia may also refer to:

- Latvian Soviet Socialist Republic (1940–1990)
- Latvia (European Parliament constituency)
- 1284 Latvia, asteroid
- Latvia Peak, mountain in Tajikistan

== See also ==
- Category:National sports teams of Latvia
- Latveria
