= Heroldsbach =

- Municipality
- Coat of arms

- Location of Heroldsbach within Forchheim district
- Interactive map of Heroldsbach
- Location within Germany Location within Bavaria
- Coordinates: 49°42′N 11°00′E
- Country: Germany
- State: Bavaria
- Admin. region: Oberfranken
- District: Forchheim
- Subdivisions: 4 Ortsteile

Government
  - Mayor (2020–26): Benedikt Graf von Bentzel (CSU)

Area
  - Total: 15.59 km^{2} (6.02 sq mi)
- Elevation: 280–370 m (920–1,210 ft)

Population (2025-12-31)
  - Total: 5,025
  - Density: 322.3/km^{2} (834.8/sq mi)
- Time zone: UTC+01:00 (CET)
  - Summer (DST): UTC+02:00 (CEST)
- Postal codes: 91336
- Dialling codes: 09190
- Vehicle registration: FO
- Website: www.heroldsbach.de

Heroldsbach is a municipality in the district of Forchheim in Bavaria in Germany.
