= Altenburg (surname) =

Altenburg is a surname. Notable people with the surname include:

- Alexandra Iosifovna of Altenburg - (1830–1911), born Princess Alexandra Friederike Henriette of Saxe-Altenburg, the fifth daughter of Joseph Georg Friedrich Ernst Karl, Duke of Saxe-Altenburg and Amelie Theresa Luise, Duchess of Württemberg.
- Dietrich von Altenburg - the 19th Grand Master of the Teutonic Knights, serving from 1335 to 1341.
- Wolfgang Altenburg - (24 June 1928 — 25 January 2023) a retired German general.
- John D. Altenburg - (born June 10, 1944) a lawyer for the U.S. Army and a retired Major General.
- Louise of Saxe-Gotha-Altenburg - (1800–1831) the wife of Ernst I, Duke of Saxe-Coburg and Gotha.
- Marichen Altenburg - (1799–1869) the mother of playwright Henrik Ibsen who belonged to the patriciate of Skien.
- Michael Altenburg - (1584–1640), a German theologian and composer.
- John Altenburgh - (born 1960), an American jazz and blues pianist, composer, arranger and producer.
- Johann Ernst Altenburg - (1734–1801), a German composer, organist and trumpeter.
