= Alte Burg (Aull) =

- Hofgut Aull
- Aull

Site information
- Type: lowland castle and settlement
- Code: DE-RP
- Condition: preserved

Location
- Coordinates: 50°23′14″N 8°00′10″E
- Height: 110 m above sea level (NN)

Site history
- Built: around 1250 to 1300
- Materials: timber-framed

Garrison information
- Occupants: ministeriales

The Alte Burg, formerly Hofgut Aull, is a mediaeval water castle in Aull in the county of Rhein-Lahn-Kreis in the German state of Rhineland-Palatinate.

== History ==
The origins of the former water castle date to the second half of the 13th century. In 1284 the castle is first mentioned as an estate of the ministerialis Helfenstein family. Nothing remains of this earlier castle.

The present gateway is dated 1558. As a result of further modifications the appearance of the castle changed up until the 18th century.

== Site ==
The small present-day castle site has Late Gothic architecture and is one of the last examples of Rhenish timber-framed castles. The castle is privately owned and is inhabited.

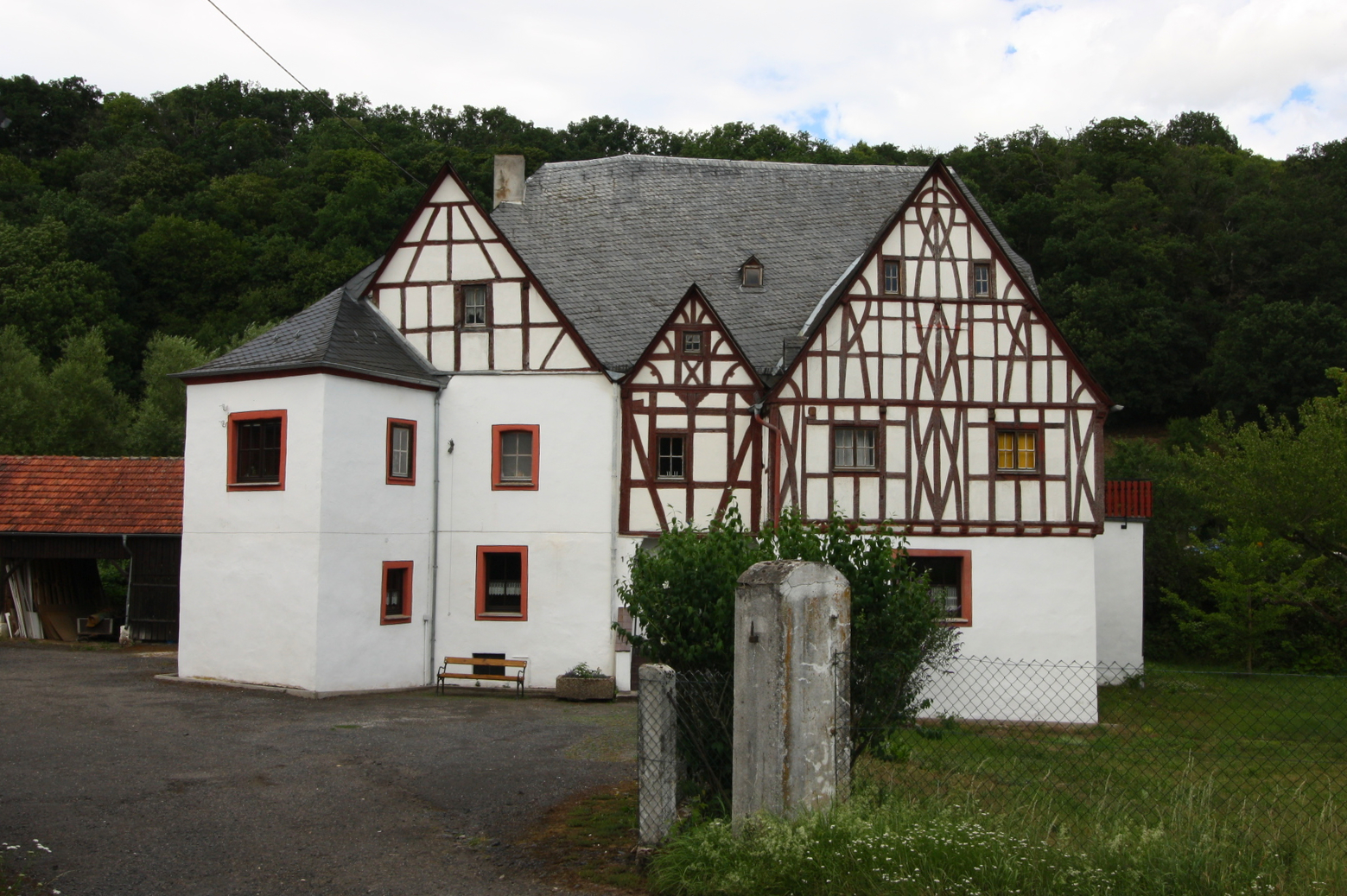
Alte Burg Aull

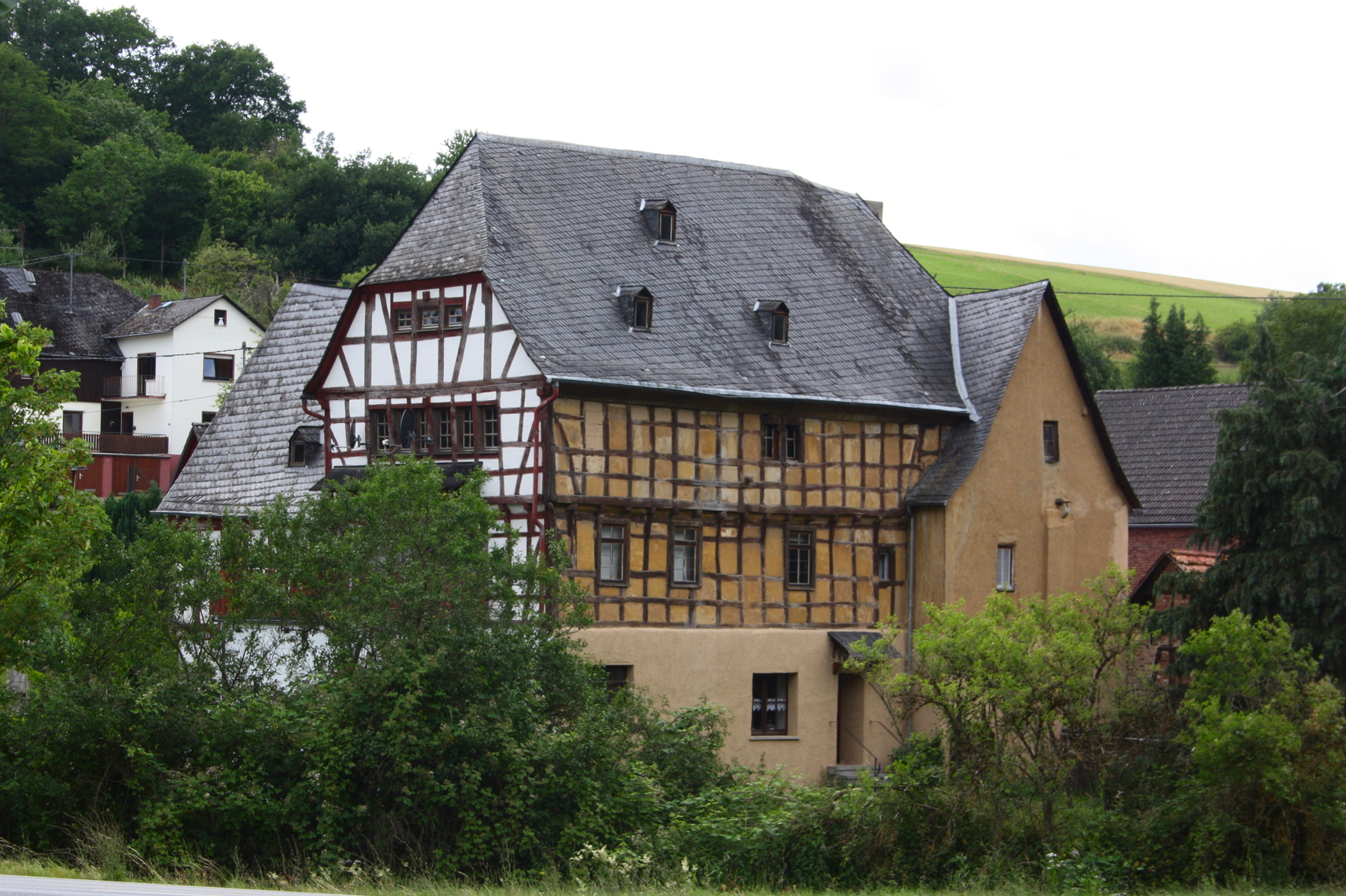
Alte Burg Aull
