= Altenburg (Niedenstein) =

Coordinates: 51°14′52″N 9°17′26″E

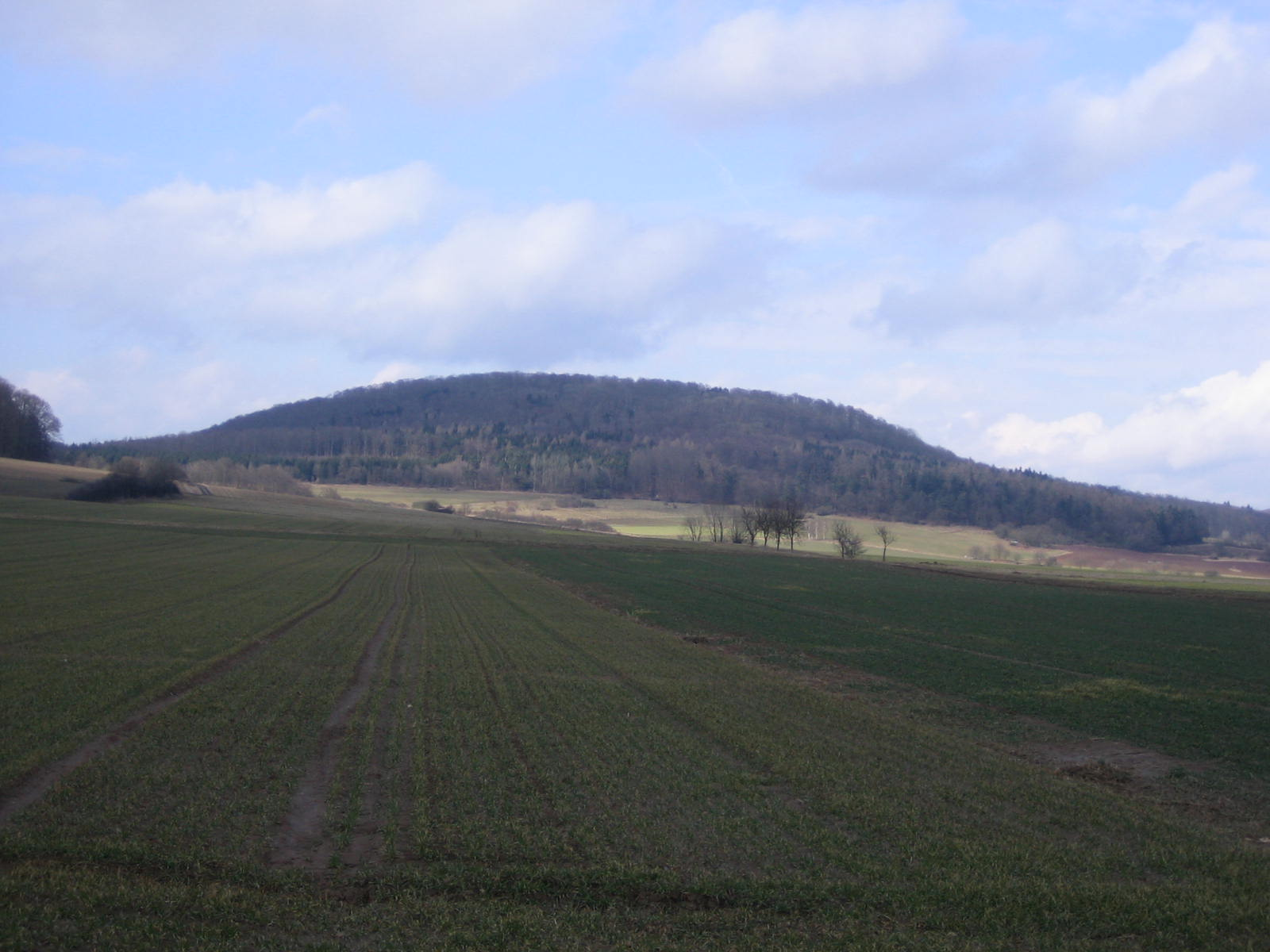
- The Altenburg mountain

Highest point
- Elevation: 451 m (1,480 ft)

Geography
- Location: Schwalm-Eder-Kreis, Hesse, Germany

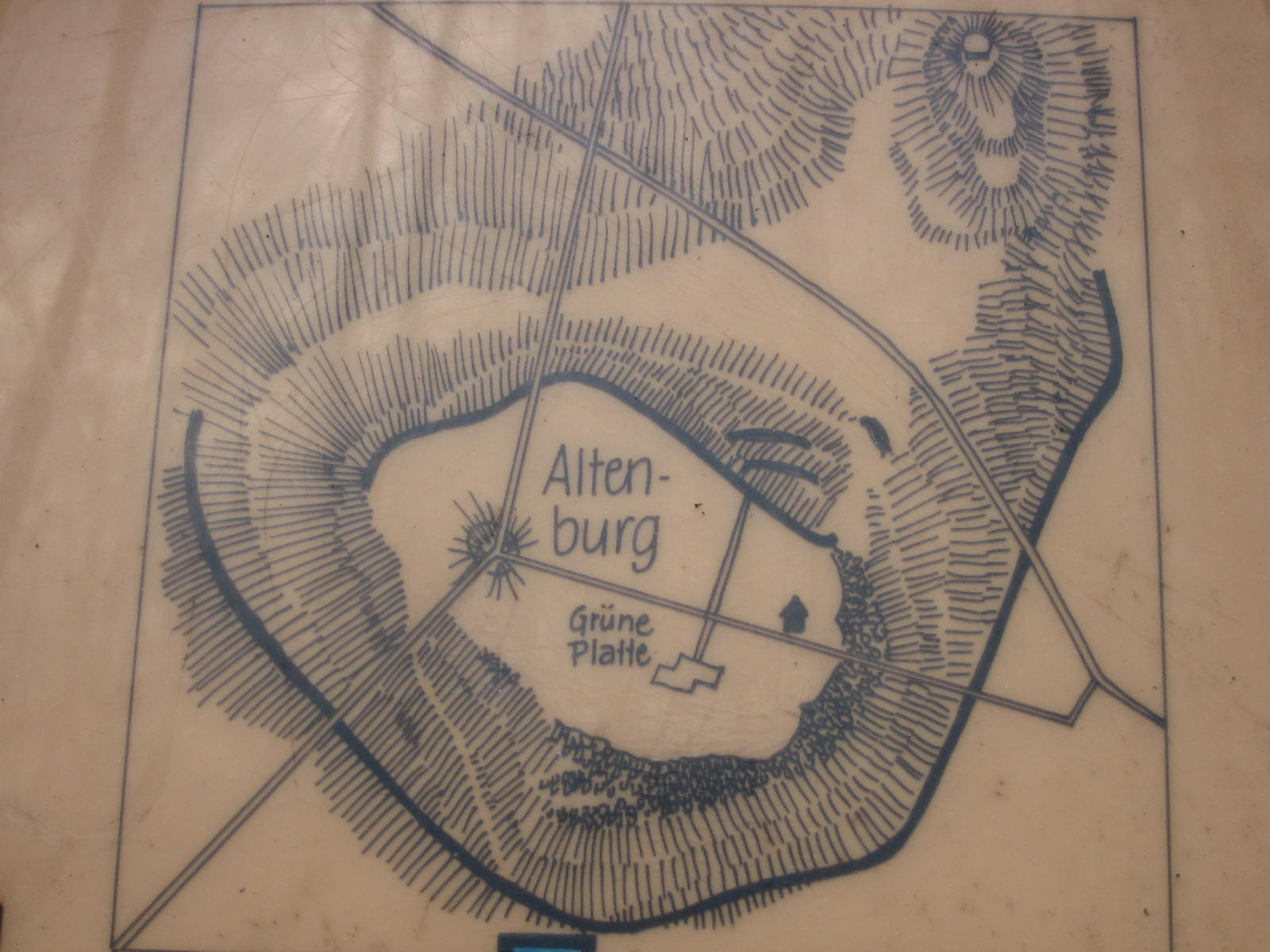
Plan of the Altenburg

The Altenburg is a hill in the county of Schwalm-Eder-Kreis, Hesse, Germany.

== Features ==
On its flat hilltop are the remains of a fairly large, fortified settlement from the Bronze Age and Iron Age.
