= Weissberg =

Weissberg is a surname. Notable people with the name include:

- Alexander Weissberg-Cybulski, Polish-Austrian physicist
- Eric Weissberg, American musician
- Isaac Jacob Weissberg (1841–1904), Hebrew writer
- Leib Weissberg, Polish rabbi
- Peter Weissberg, British physician
- Robert Weissberg, American political scientist
- Roger Weissberg, American psychologist
- Drossel Weissberg, a fictional character from Atelier Firis: The Alchemist and the Mysterious Journey

== See also ==
- Yuliya Veysberg, Russian music critic
