= Altenburg (Neuental) =

Coordinates: 51°02′40″N 9°12′45″E

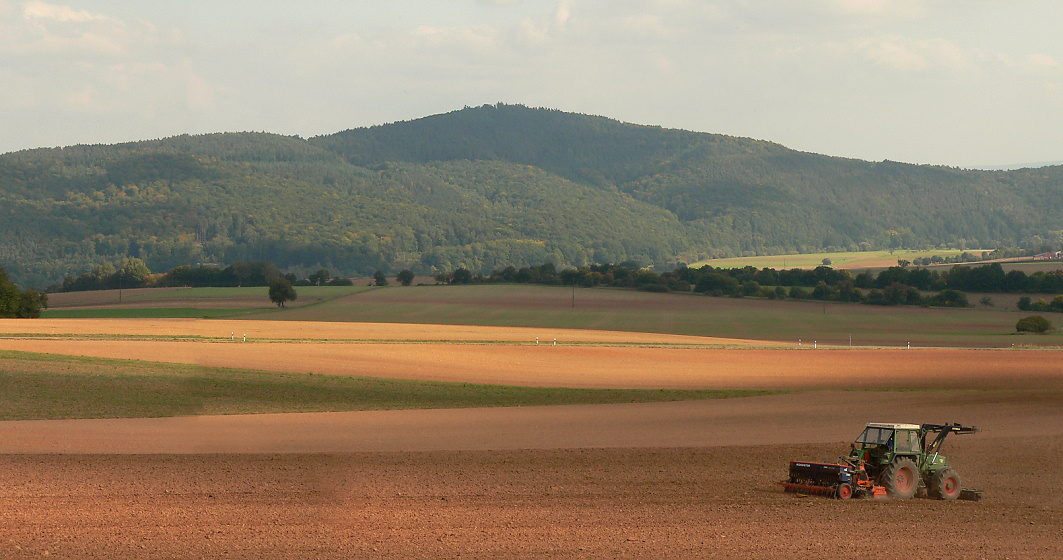
- Altenburg seen from the southwest

Highest point
- Elevation: 433 m (1,421 ft)

Geography
- Location: Schwalm-Eder-Kreis, Hesse, Germany

Altenburg is a hill in the county of Schwalm-Eder-Kreis, Hesse, Germany.
