= Altes Schloss (Affalterthal) =

- Egloffstein-Affalterthal-"Altschlossberg"
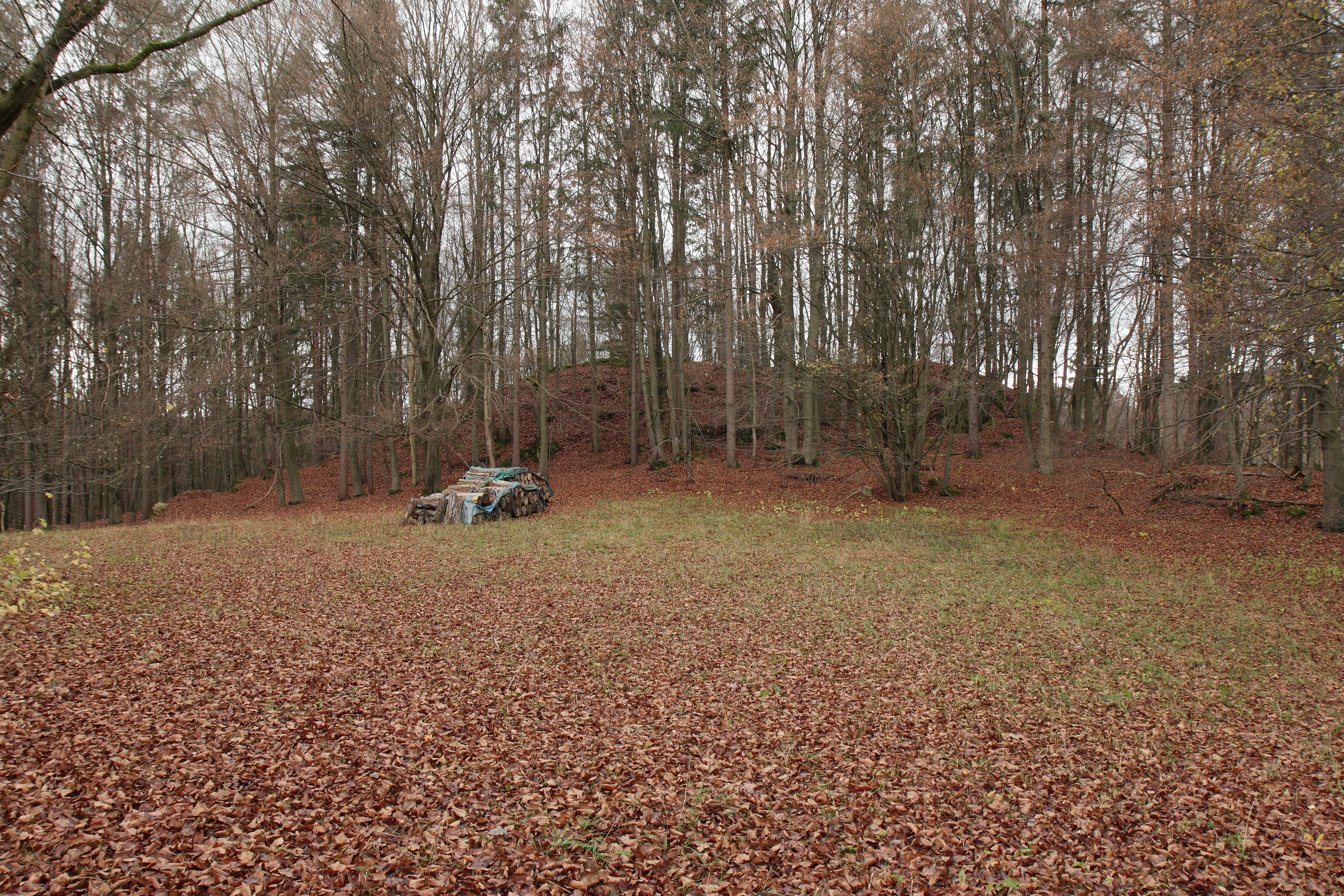
- View of the burgstall from the east (November 2013)

Site information
- Type: Hill castle on a spur
- Code: DE-BY
- Condition: burgstall (no above-ground ruins)

Location
- Location within Germany
- Coordinates: 49°42′39″N 11°16′00″E
- Height: 458.9 m above sea level (NN)

Site history
- Built: Probably High Middle Ages
- Materials: Quadermauerwerk

Garrison information
- Occupants: Unknown

The burgstall of the Altes Schloss ("Old Castle" or "Old Palace") is the site of an old castle near the village of Affalterthal in Bavaria, that was probably built in the High Middle Ages for the nobility. It lies within the municipality of Egloffstein in the Upper Franconian county of Forchheim.

The site of the former spur castle is freely accessible.

== Location ==
The small, former hill castle site is located in the Franconian Switzerland-Veldenstein Forest Nature Park, about 850 metres west-northwest of the church in Affalterthal at a height of 458.9 m above sea level (NN) on the summit of the Altschlossberg, about 15 kilometres east of Forchheim.

Very close by stands Egloffstein Castle and the ruins of Thuisbrunn and Schlossberg castles. To the northwest near Oberzaunsbach is another burgstall, also named the Altes Schloss. To the north near the village of Äpfelbach are the remains of a large pre- and early historical fortification on the Heidelberg.

== History ==
Nothing is known of the history of the little castle. According to the Nuremberg Castle researcher, Hellmut Kunstmann, the lords of Egloffstein, who were influential in this area, could have built it. Another possibility is that Otto of Affaltert, who is mentioned in 1133, might have occupied the castle. However, he is a witness to a document between Upper Palatine ministeriales, so he could also have come from the region of Upper Palatinate and would not be the castle lord.

In 1610 during the settlement of a boundary dispute over a forest at a place called Wolfsreuth, a Deutsches Schloss is mentioned, which probably refers to the Altes Schloss near Affalterthal.

The Bavarian State Office for Monument Protection describes the site as "the probable prehistorical hill settlement and medieval burgstall of Altes Schloss" and has allocated it monument number D-4-6233-0081.

== Description ==
The former castle stood on a rocky summit, the highest point of a hill spur that pointed towards the northwest. On its northwestern and northeastern sides the spur is bounded by the valley of the Brunnengraben, where the steep drop of the hillside ensured that the castle was naturally well protected. On the southwestern side the spur is bounded by the Neugraben valley; here the slope is more moderate and drops in steps down to the valley, so that an enemy attack from this side was entirely possible. Towards the east the terrain drops about eight metres. Here a six to eight-metre-wide moat was cut out, which was protected by a rampart in front of it; the whole guarding the eastern side of the castle.

The plan of the site is roughly triangular and has an area of about 35 by 25 metres. On the castle plateau only a few traces of the old buildings have survived. On the northeastern side are two stone ramparts that run parallel to the edge of the plateau and which are separated by a roughly two-metre-wide and one-metre-deep ditch. The longer, outer rampart is ten metres long; the inner one is roughly eight metres long. In the west, in addition to the stone ramparts, is a round, two-metre-deep hollow, that is probably the cellar of a castle building. Immediately next to it are the remains of a rectangular foundation wall about 3 and 1.8 metres long, consisting of ashlar-shaped, rough-hewn stones. On the southern side, another, roughly 1.5-metre-deep rectangular hollow is discernible. It is enclosed on three sides by ramparts with mortar remains, so that this is possibly the remnant of a tower-like building.

The castle path probably ran below the tower-like building on the southern hillside along an old carter's drove, then turned north at the southwestern end of the castle plateau and then reached the castle approaches.

== Gallery ==
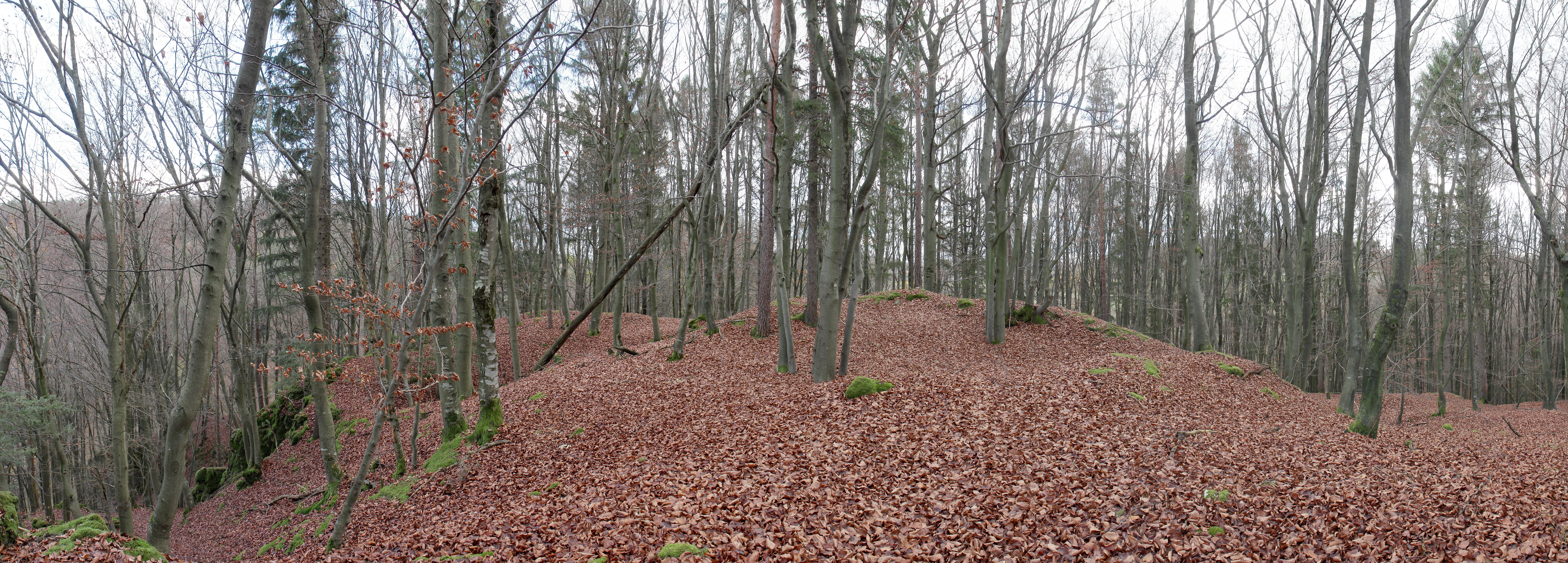
View over the castle terrain. In the foreground: the foundation of a tower-shaped building. Behind: the cellar hollow of another building (November 2013)
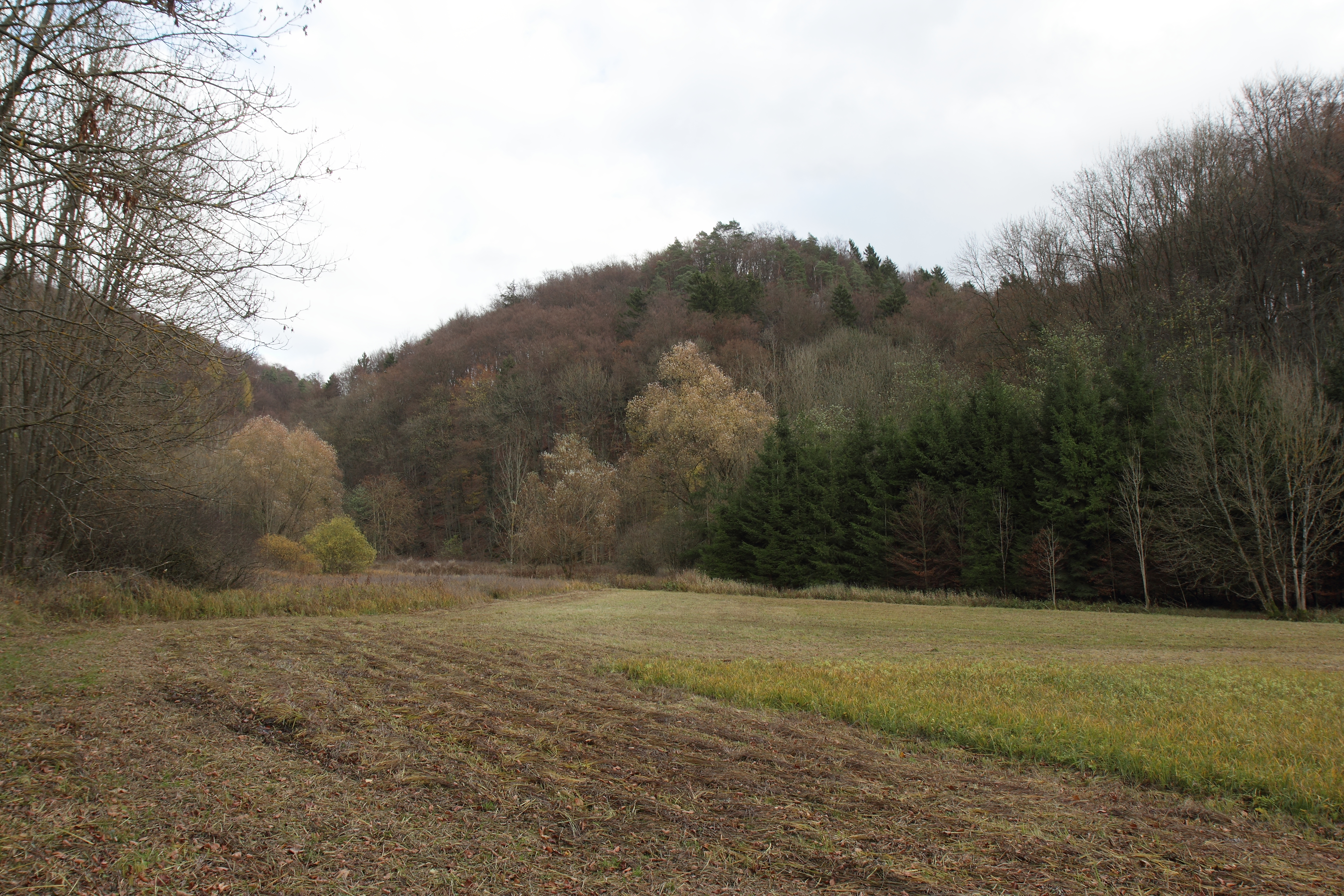
View of the Altschlossberg from the Brunnengraben valley to the west (November 2013)

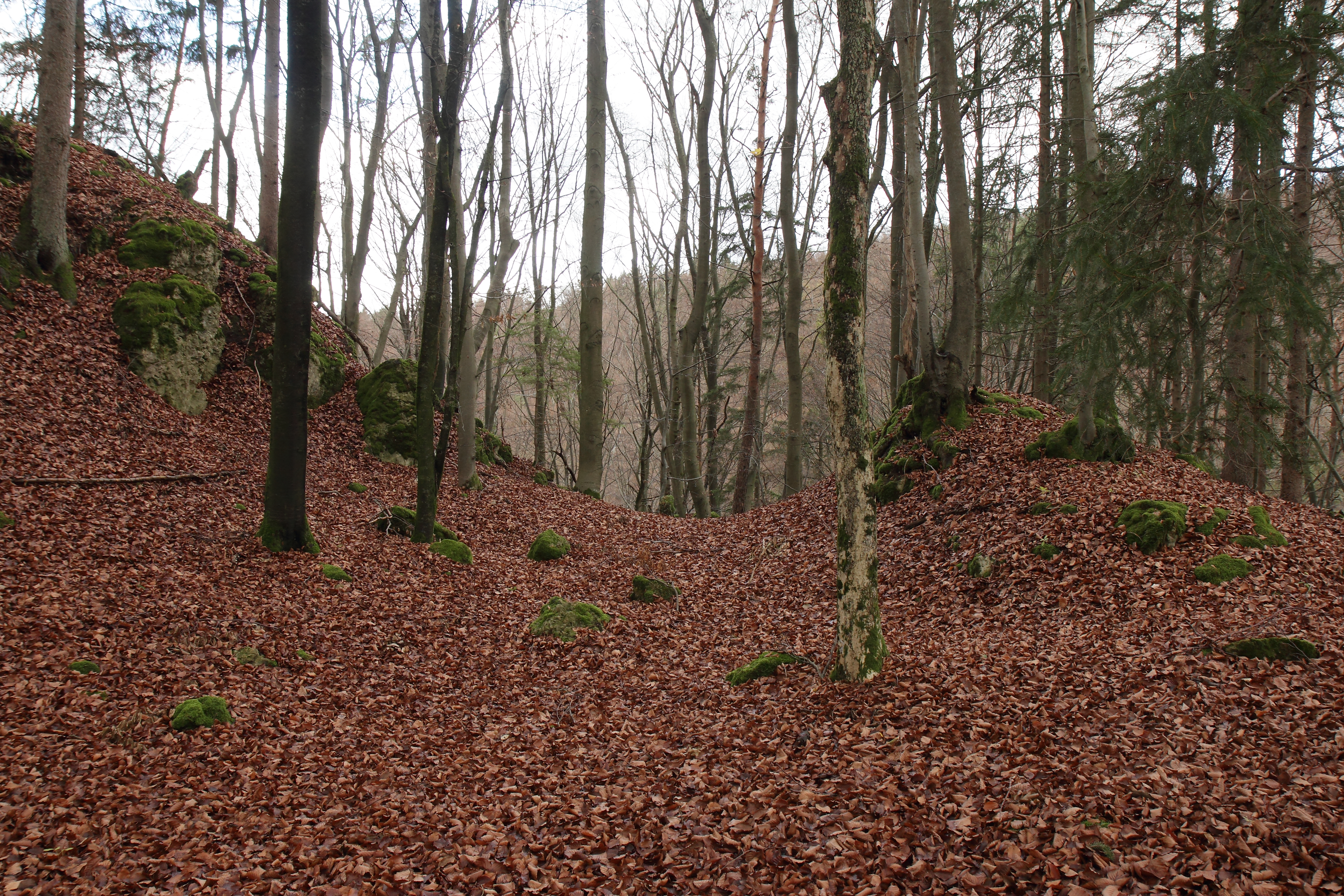
The clearest profile of the moat and the advance rampart in the northeast (November 2013)

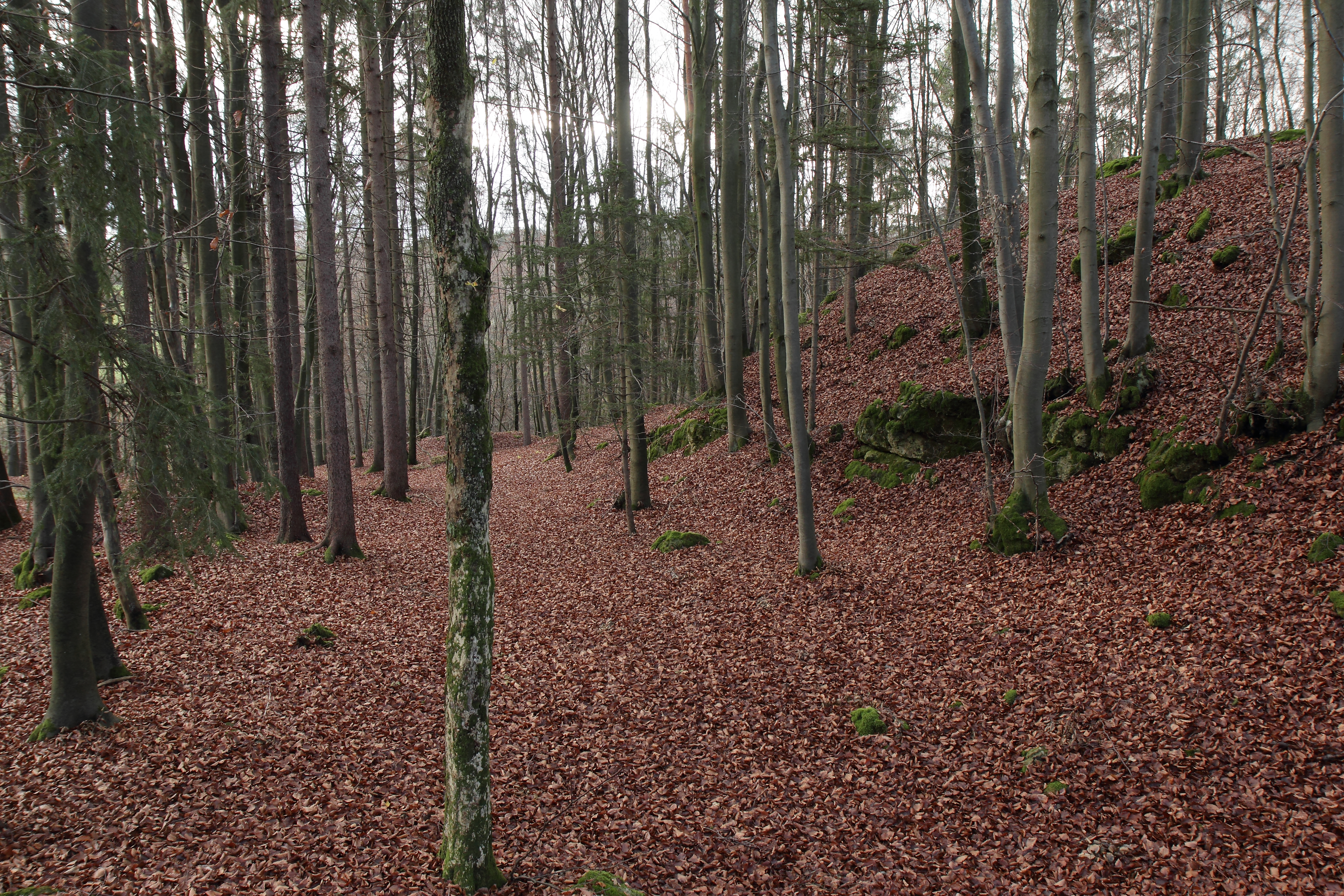
Counterview looking south. Right: the climb to the castle site (November 2013)

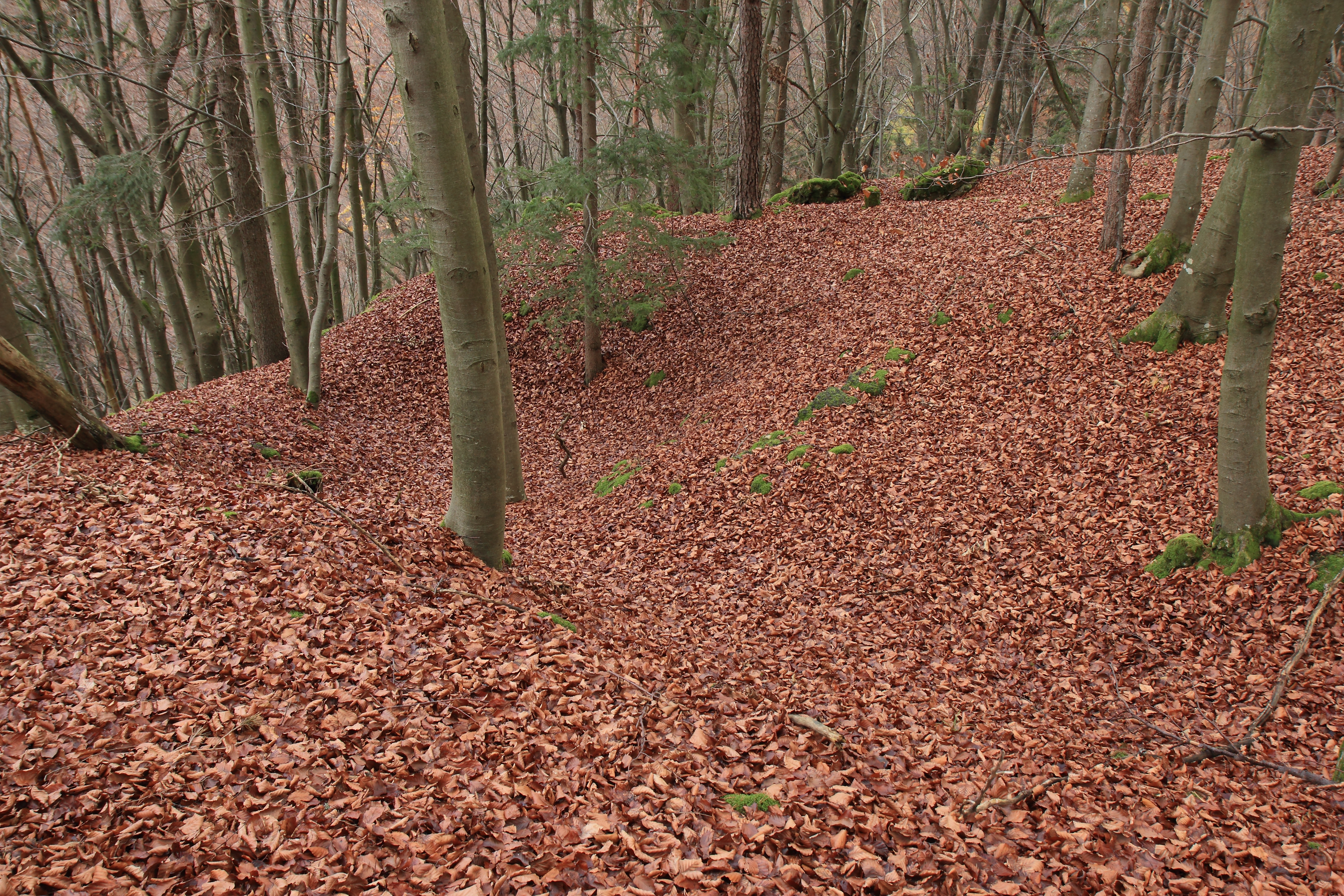
Probably the cellar pit of a castle building. Centre right: the L-shaped foundation wall remains (November 2013)

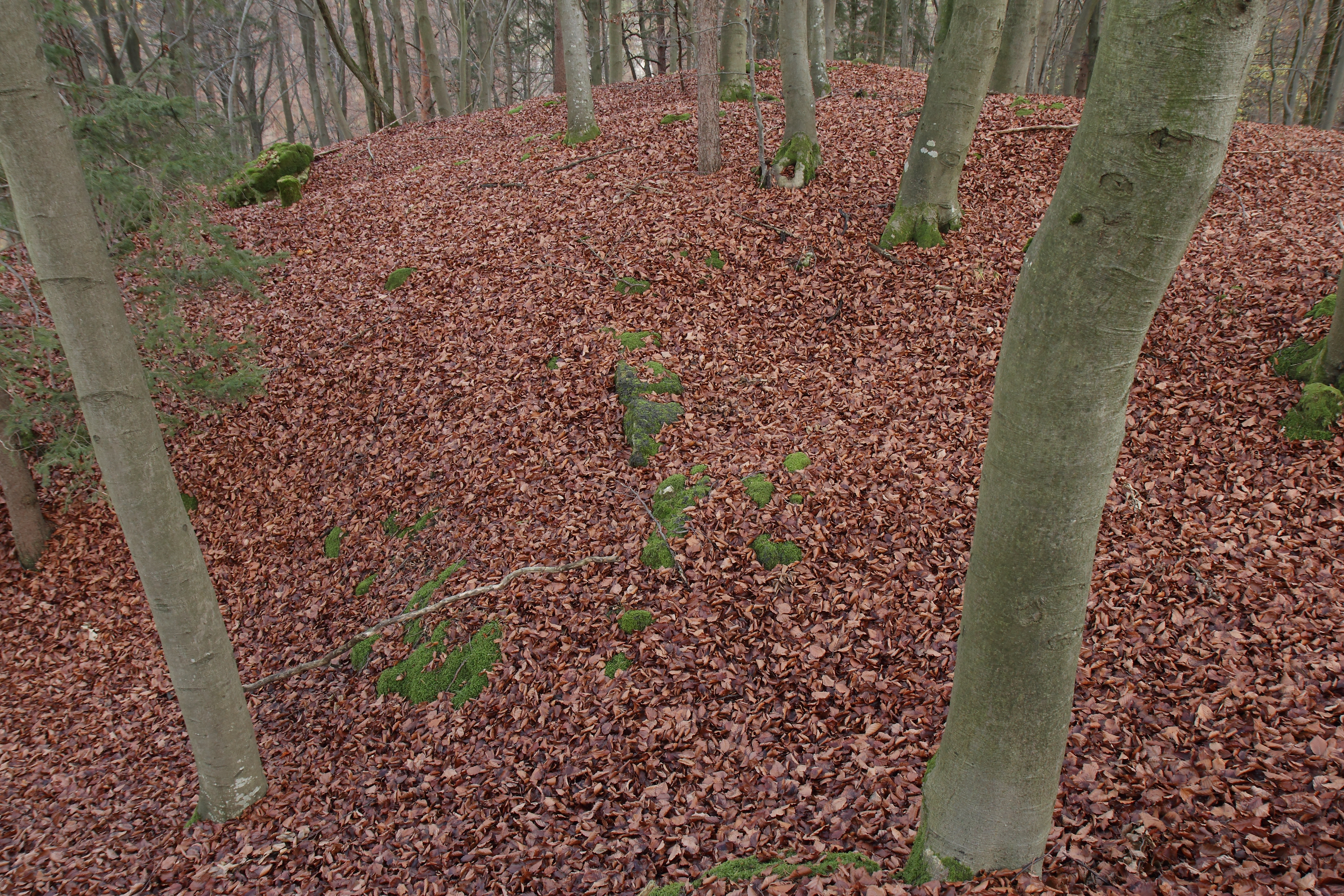
L-shaped foundation wall remains (November 2013)

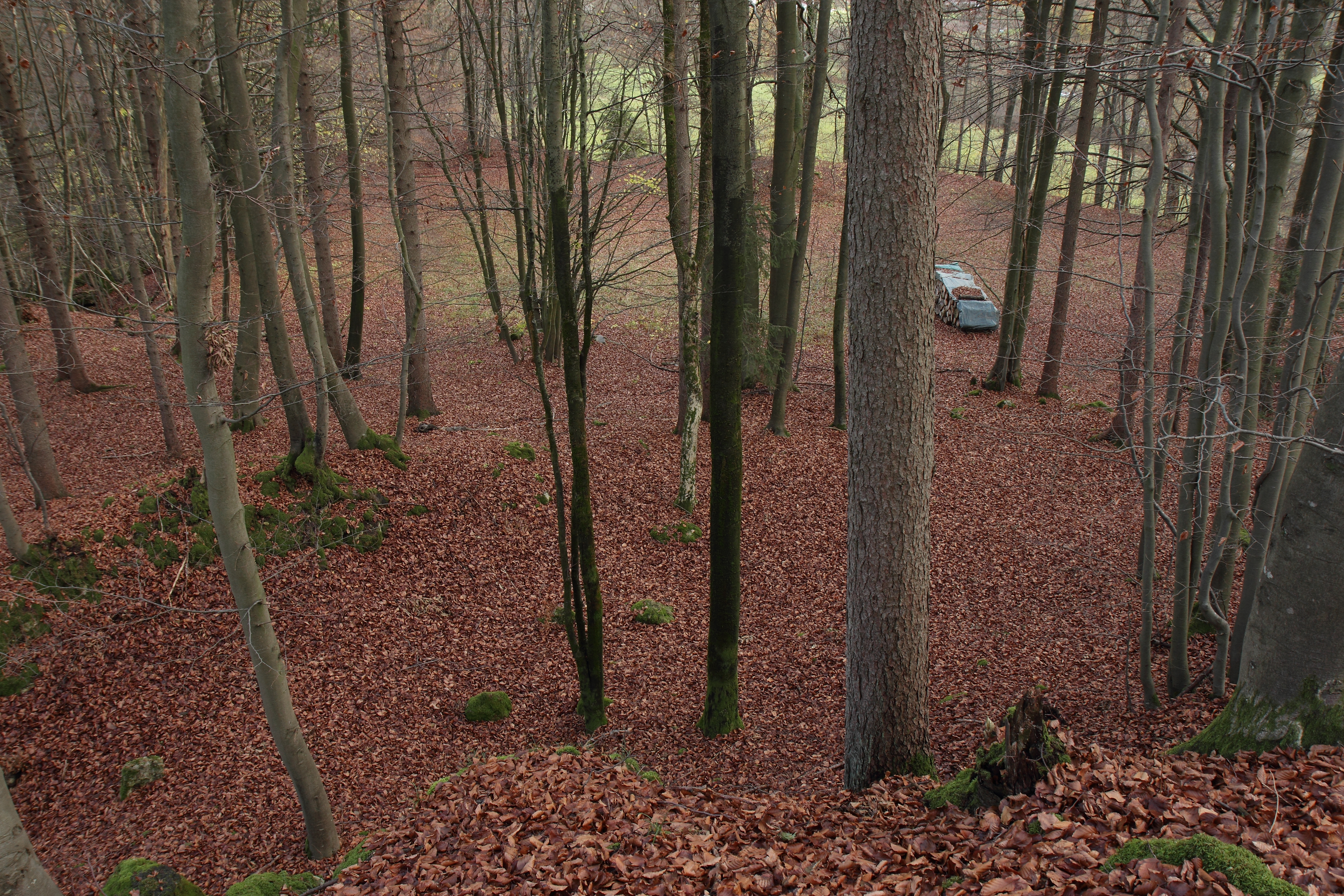
View from the site over the moat and rampart looking east (November 2013)

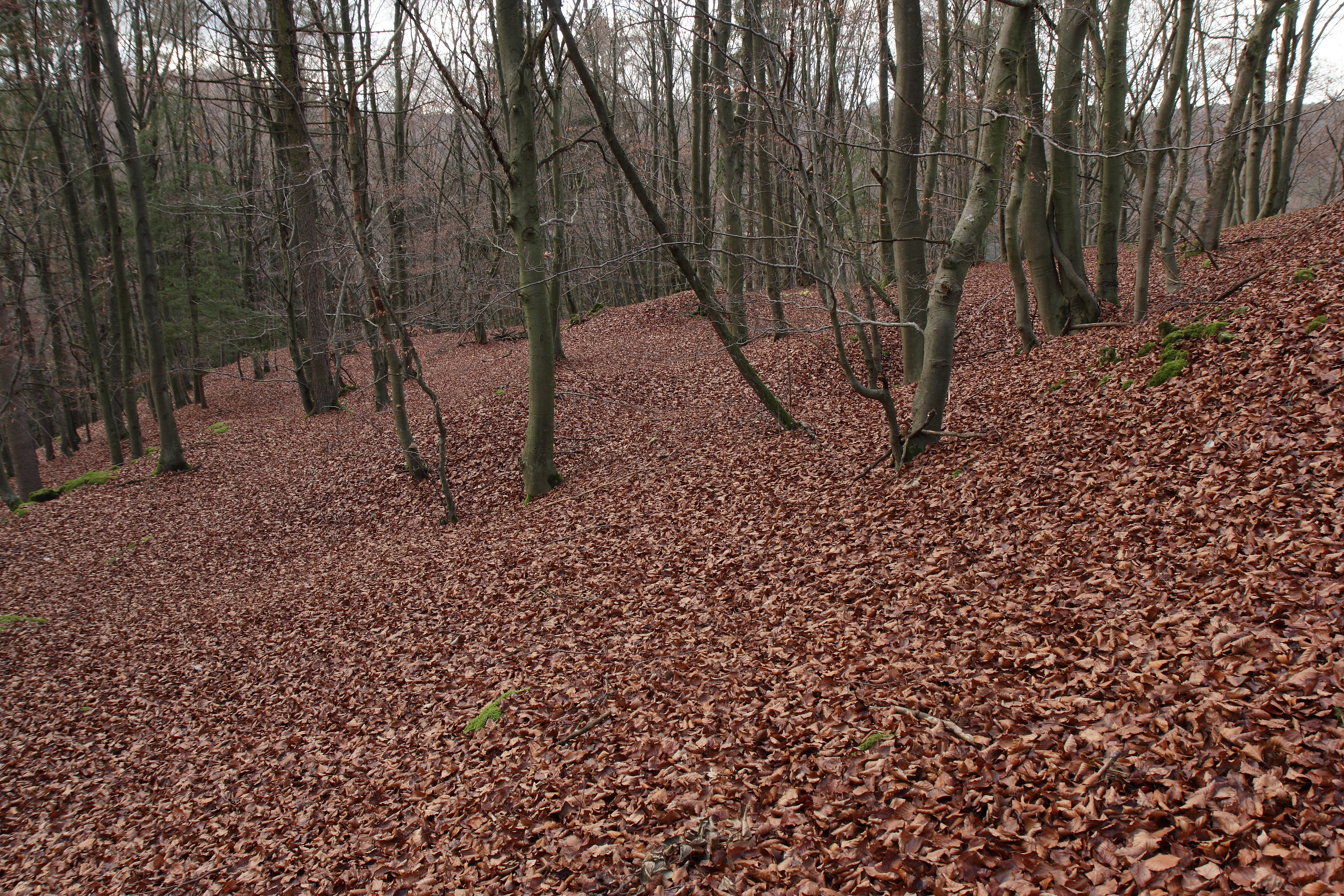
View looking west towards the tip of the spur. The limit of building in this direction is not clear due to recent disturbance. (November 2013)

== Literature ==
- Walter Heinz: Ehemalige Adelssitze im Trubachtal: Ein Wegweiser für Heimatfreunde und Wanderer. Palm und Enke Verlag, Erlangen und Jena, 1996, ISBN 3-7896-0554-9, pp. 181–185.
- Hellmut Kunstmann: Die Burgen der südwestlichen Fränkischen Schweiz. 2. Auflage. Kommissionsverlag Degener & Co., Neustadt an der Aisch, 1990, pp. 238–239.
- Klaus Schwarz: Die vor- und frühgeschichtlichen Geländedenkmäler Oberfrankens. (Materialhefte zur bayerischen Vorgeschichte, Series B, Vol. 5). Verlag Michael Lassleben, Kallmünz, 1955, p. 88.
