= Schloss Hundshaupten =

German castle

Coordinates: 49°43′14″N 11°13′33″E

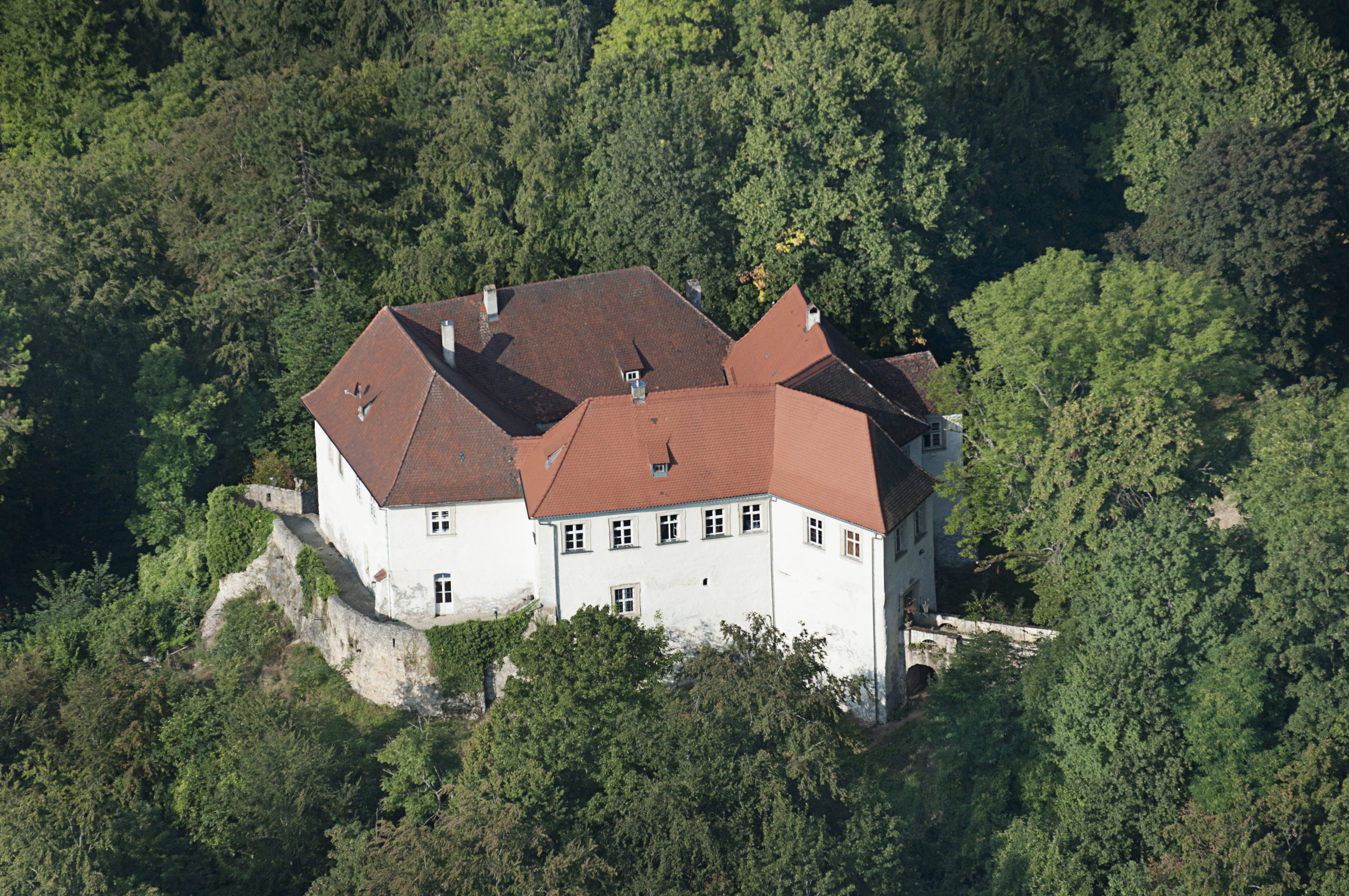
Schloss Hundshaupten, 2016 aerial photograph

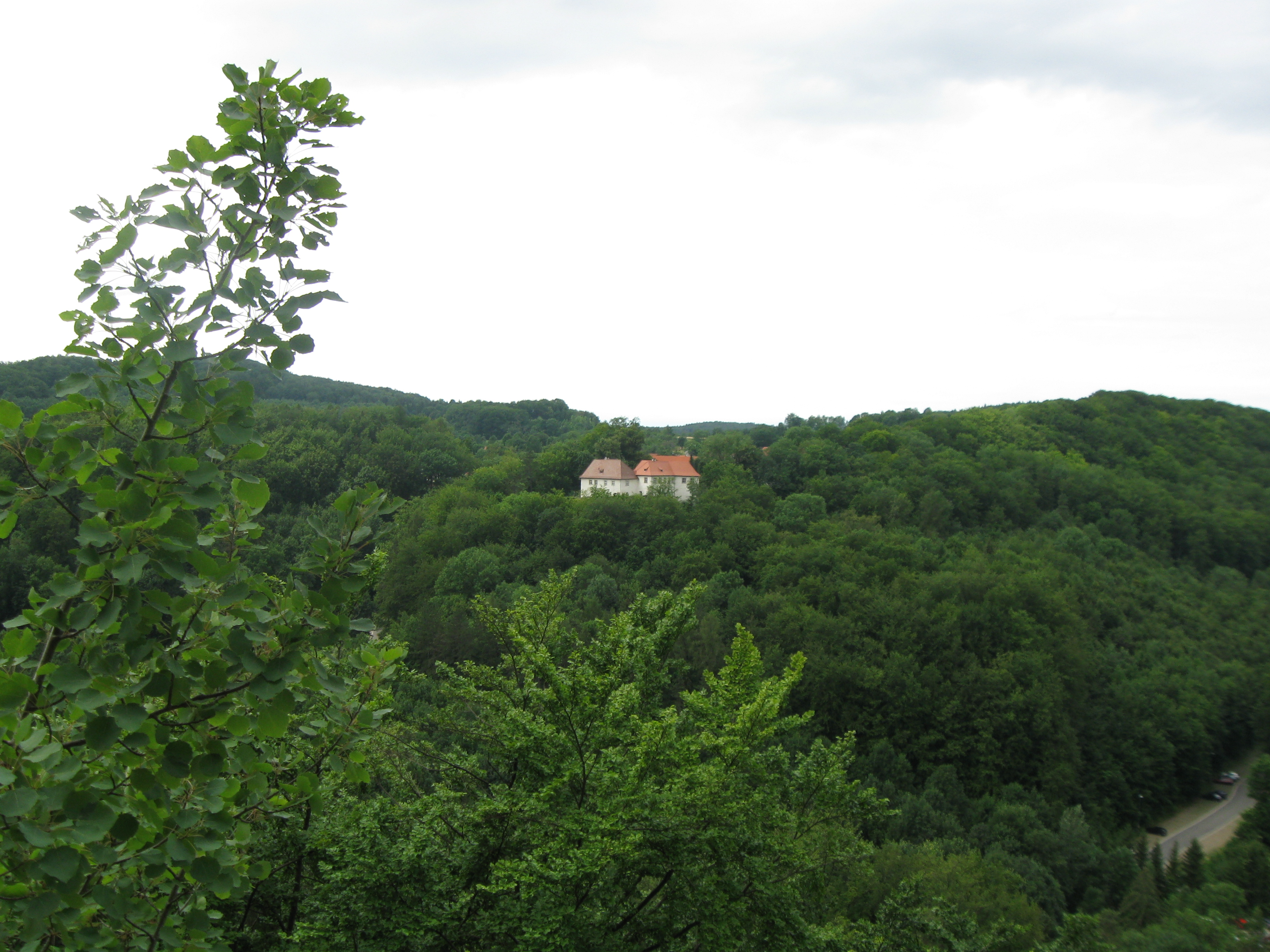
Schloss Hundshaupten

Schloss Hundshaupten is a quadrangular castle in the village of Hundshaupten in the municipality of Egloffstein in the German county of Forchheim.

== History ==
The castle is recorded for the first time in 1369 in the ownership of the Lords of Wiesenthau. It was, like almost all castles in Franconian Switzerland, built on a hill spur of the Franconian Jura plateau jutting out into the valley. Following its destruction in 1388 by Nuremberg during the War of the Cities, in 1412 by Burgrave Frederick VI of Nuremberg and in 1525 during the Peasants' War, then it was rebuilt in 1561.

In 1613, when the Wiesenthau line at Hundshaupten died out, the fief reverted to Michelsberg Abbey in the city of Bamberg. In 1661, after the Thirty Years' War, the abbey sold the castle to Hieronymus Christopher, Freiherr of Pölnitz, town commandant of Forchheim, who resided in Aschbach, now a village in the municipality of Schlüsselfeld. In the years that followed, work was carried out, but its castle character was not changed.

During 1991, part of the estate was gifted by Gudila, Freifrau of Pölnitz to the county of Forchheim, including Hundshaupten Wildlife Park.

Hieronymus Christopher Heinrich Freiherr von Pölnitz, great nephew and adoptive son of Götz Freiherr von Pölnitz and Gudila Freifrau von Pölnitz continue to live there.

== Meaning of the placename ==
The meaning of the placename of Hundshaupten can no longer be explained with certainty today. There are several possibilities that have been suggested and compared by Dorothea Fastnacht.

The names of the neighbouring villages of Hundshaupten and Hundsboden should be seen as connected. The suffix, '-haupten' probably refers to the hill spur on which, initially a castle and, later, the present schloss were built. By contrast, the suffix, '-boden', suggests a level field of fertile soil on the plateau that was cleared in the High Middle Ages as part of the expansion of cultivated land. The prefix 'Hund-' probably refers to the owner of the clearance and the castle, with the office of a Hunno (chief of a Hundertschaft). With the firm establishment of feudal lordship, this office became hereditary during the High Middle Ages and filled by local nobility. Originally, during the Migration Era and in the Early Middle Ages the leader of a community of free farmers was called a Hunno.

== Family cemetery ==
Below Schloss Hundshaupten in a stand of old beech trees between the rocks of the Jura lies a family cemetery. The first interment was in 1944 was of Geheimrat Paul Fridolin Kehr. Family members who had died earlier were transferred here. The following members of the Pölnitz family are buried here:

- Max Freiherr von Pölnitz, (born 29 April 1862, Bamberg; died 7 May 1936, Aschbach), Royal Bavarian Chamberlain, District Amtmann a. D., lord of an entailed estate (Fideicomissherr)
- Gisela Freifrau von Pölnitz, née Gräfin von Gatterburg, (born 9 September 1869, Pasing; died 7 August 1914, Munich)
- Ilona Freifrau von Pölnitz, née Gräfin Mikes von Zabola (born 28 June 1871, Zabola/Hungary, family seat of the Mikes family; died 21 December 1951, Munich)
- Hieronymus Christoph Franz Sigmund Maria Freiherr von Pölnitz (born 28 September 1901, Munich; died 23 April 1978, Bamberg), canon, honorary prelate, church historian, director of the Archives of the Archbishopric of Bamberg and Bamberg Diocesan Museum
- Hieronymus Christoph Jan Eugen Franz Gottfried (Götz) Freiherr von Pölnitz (born 11 December 1906, Munich; died 9 November 1967, Erlangen), professor at the University of Erlangen-Nuremberg and Regensburg, administrator and archives director of the Princely and Comital Fugger Foundations, estate owner, founding chancellor of the University of Regensburg
- Gudila Freifrau von Pölnitz, née Kehr (born 17 November 1913, Rome; died 11 January 2002, Ebermannstadt), member of the Bavarian Landtag from 1970 to 1982
- Paul Fridolin Kehr (born 28 December 1860; died 9 November 1944), Geheimrat, President of the Zentraldirektion of Monumenta Germaniae Historica, Professor in Marburg and Göttingen, head of the Prussian Historical Institute in Rome, Director General of the Prussian State Archives.
- Doris Kehr, née vom Baur (born 6 January 1885; died 27 February 1979)
- Ivo Kehr, memorial tablet (born 28 April 1911, Brüssel; died 17 April 1943, Nowovssisk)
- Romolus Kehr (born 18 August 1909, Brüssel; died 28 January 1924, Berlin)
- Franziska von Ballarini née Gräfin von Gatterburg (born 17 August 1863; died 17 January 1955), sister of Gisela Frfr. v. Pölnitz
- Franz Graf von Gatterburg, (born 6 November 1833, Retz, died 9 February 1898, Pasing), father of Gisela Frfr. v. Pölnitz
- Pauline Gräfin von Gatterburg, née Freiin von Beck-Peccoz (2 December 1841, Augsburg; died 18 September 1931, Pasing)
- Adam Friedrich Joseph Heinrich von Künsberg; (born 2 August 1821; died 26 August 1896) –previously interred in Bamberg
- Anna von Künsberg, née Freiin von Pölnitz (born 27 September 1825; died 7 January 1887), sister of Franz Frhr. v. Pölnitz
- Elvira von Künsberg, née Kleiner (born 7 April 1855, died 12 November 1936)
- Marietta Amanda Eugenie Amalie Anna von Sartor auf Gansheim (born 30 April 1892, Munich; died 7 June 1970, Munich). The male line died out. Marietta was the daughter of Eugen von Sartor and Amalie, née Freiin von Pölnitz, sister of Max Freiherr von Pölnitz
- Christian von Schmaltz, (born 22 November 1845, Germersheim; died 28 February 1927, Munich), son of the general and Greek minister of war, Heinrich Christian von Schmaltz
- Anna von Schmaltz née Freiin von Pölnitz, (born 1 April 1867, Aschbach; died 9 March 1935, Munich), sister of Max Frhr. v. Pölnitz
- Joseph Anton Freiherr von Pölnitz (born 4 February 1792, Würzburg; died 22 February 1865) Royal Bavarian Chamberlain, state commissar, brother of Heinrich Frhr. v. Pölnitz
- Charlotte Freifrau von Pölnitz, née von Fliesen (born 7 October 1805; died 28 July 1860)
- Walburga Freifrau von Pölnitz von und zu Egloffstein, née Gräfin von Preysing Lichtenegg-Moos, (born 28 April 1937, Biedenbach Ndb.; died 25 March 2010, Vilsbiburg)

Memorial tablet for:

- Franz Karl Ludwig Freiherr von Poelnitz, Royal Bavarian Rittmeister à la suite and lord of the manor (born 20 January 1827; died 19 April 1896, father of Gerhard von Poelnitz)
- Adolphine Emilie Adele Freifrau von Poelnitz née Freiin von Schaezler (born 4 July 1834; died 8 October 1878, mother of Gerhard von Poelnitz)
- Else Freifrau von Poelnitz née von Thiereck (born 13 November 1870; died 10 November 1917)
- Ludwig Freiherr von Poelnitz, Royal Bavarian Colonel a. D., Artillery Commander No. 23 1914/1918 (born 25 August 1863; died 9 May 1928, younger brother of Max von Poelnitz, his sister was Anna von Schmaltz)
- Ludwig Freiherr von Poelnitz, (born 15 December 1899; died 21 November 1908)
- Walter Freiherr von Poelnitz, Royal Prussian Lieutenant in the Life Dragoons. 20th Regiment, (born 13 July 1892 in Augsburg; fell 6 October 1914 in Frolinghien, Northern France)
- Elisabeth von Thiereck née Schmid, * 24 March 1850; died 19 February 1909
- Albin von Thiereck (born 10 April 1841; died 27 February 1929)
- Paul von Thiereck (born and died 26 February 1872)

== Literature ==
- Walter Heinz: Ehemalige Adelssitze im Trubachtal. Verlag Palm und Enke, Erlangen and Jena, 1996, ISBN 3-7896-0554-9, pp. 195–206.
- Hellmut Kunstmann: Die Burgen der südwestlichen Fränkischen Schweiz. Kommissionsverlag Degener & Co, Neustadt an der Aisch, 1990, pp. 248–260.
- Gustav Voit, Walter Rüfer: Eine Burgenreise durch die Fränkische Schweiz – Auf den Spuren des Zeichners A. F. Thomas Ostertag, 2nd edition, Verlag Palm & Enke, Erlangen, 1991, ISBN 3-7896-0064-4, pp. 90–92.
- Toni Eckert, Susanne Fischer, Renate Freitag, Rainer Hofmann, Walter Tausendpfund: Die Burgen der Fränkischen Schweiz – Ein Kulturführer. Gürtler Druck, Forchheim, ISBN 3-9803276-5-5, pp. 74–78.
- Der immatrikulierte Adel in Bayern, Vol. 19, p. 397 (for all those named here)
- Handbuch der bayerischen Landtagsabgeordneten (for Gudila von Pölnitz)
- Historischer Vereinsbericht Nr. 114, pages VII-X (obituary of Sigmund von Pölnitz)
- Götz Reichsfreiherr von Pölnitz, Akademische Trauerfeier am 9. November 1967. Kallmünz, 1970
- Schematismen des Bistums Bamberg (for Sigmund von Pölnitz)
- Peter Jakob Kock: Der Bayerische Landtag, eine Chronik (for Gudila von Pölnitz)
- Dorothea Fastnacht, Der Ortsname Hundshaupten, pp. 87–106 (pdf; 1.1 MB) in: Namenkundliche Informationen, ed. by Ernst Eichler, Karlheinz Hengst, Dietlind Kremer, Leipziger Universitätsverlag, 2011, 98, ISSN 0943-0849.

== Archive documents ==
- Stadtarchiv Bamberg, D2033 No. 200.125
