= Egloffstein Castle =

Castle in Germany

- Egloffstein
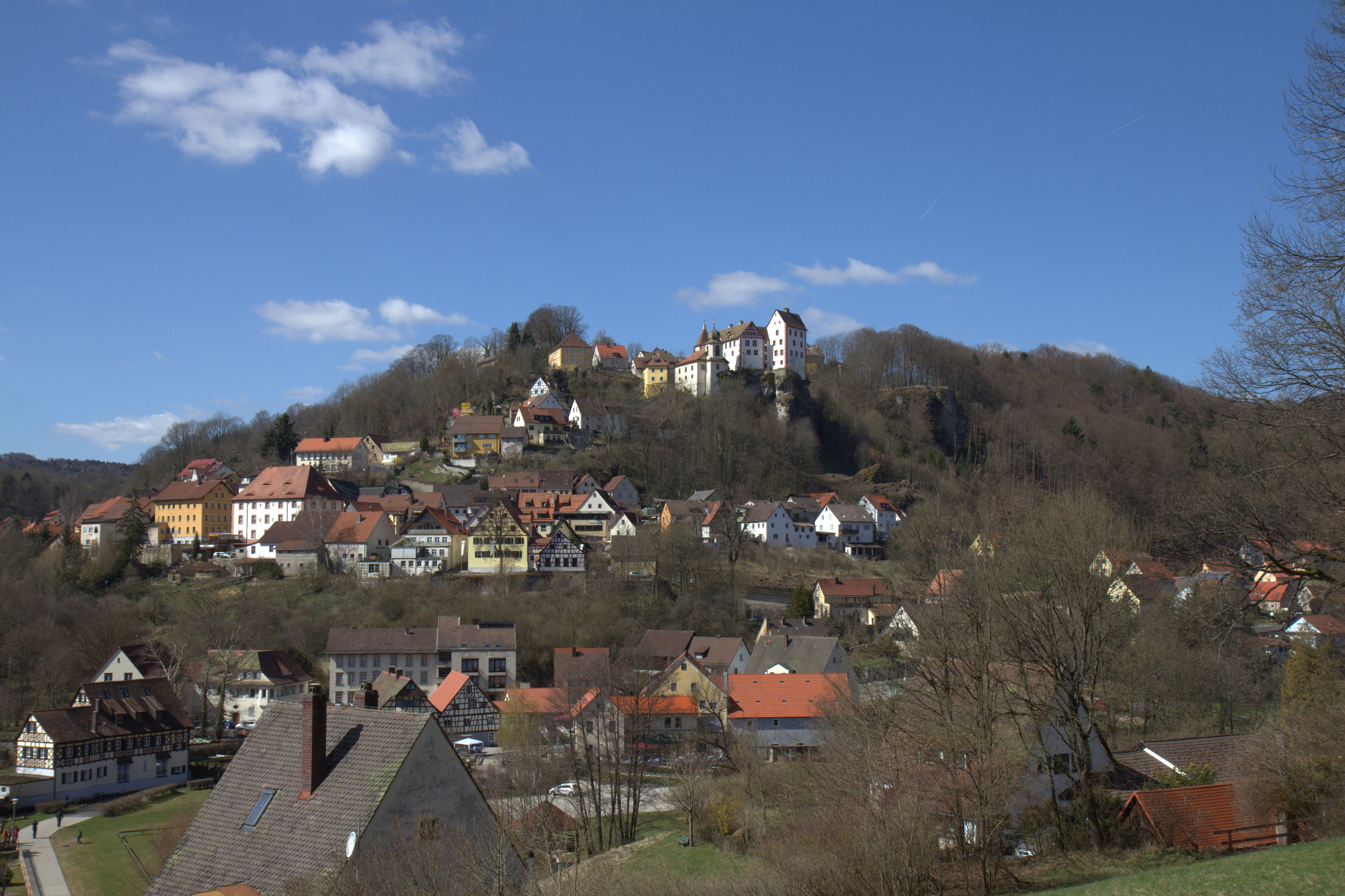
- Egloffstein Castle seen from the east (Mar 2012)

Site information
- Type: hill castle, spur castle
- Code: DE-BY
- Condition: preserved or largely preserved

Location
- Location within Bavaria Location within Germany
- Coordinates: 49°42′09″N 11°15′27″E
- Height: 443 m above sea level (NHN)

Site history
- Built: c. 1150

Garrison information
- Occupants: Freiherren (free nobles)

Egloffstein Castle (German: Burg Egloffstein) is a former high mediaeval, aristocratic castle, that stands immediately west of the eponymous village of Egloffstein in the Upper Franconian county of Forchheim in the German state of Bavaria.

The castle may be visited for an entrance fee.

== Location ==
The spur castle is located within the Franconian Switzerland-Veldenstein Forest Nature Park at a height of 443 metres on a rocky, eastwards-pointing promontory of the Rabenstein, about 80 metres above the village in the Trubach valley in the hill region of Franconian Switzerland.

In the vicinity are also the castles of Thuisbrunn, Hundshaupten and Wolfsberg. Other castles not far from Egloffstein include the Altes Schloss on the Altschlossberg hill near Affalterthal, the ruins of Dietrichstein near Lützelsdorf and the ruins on the Zaunsbacher Berg and Thüngfelderstein as well as the former castle by Heidhof on the Schlossberg.

== History ==
The earliest record of the lords of Egloffstein dates from 1180. The castle was first mentioned in 1358, when Albert II of Egloffstein and his brothers founded a chaplaincy there, but it is probably older than that. The lords of Egloffstein initially owned the castle as an allod.

In 1372, during a feud with the Bishop of Bamberg, Götz von Egloffstein returned to his family castle at Egloffstein after the destruction of Leienfels Castle, which also belonged to him. In order to avoid Egloffstein Castle being besieged by the Bishop of Bamberg, Götz was excluded from the family association in 1374.

In 1376 the Bishop of Bamberg, Lamprecht of Brunn (1374–1398) forced Seybot II von Egloffstein to grant Öffnungsrecht to the Bishopric in the majority of the castle.

During the First Margrave War in 1449/50 the castle was attacked unsuccessfully by troops of Margrave Albert Achilles on 8 April 1450, but it was nevertheless badly damaged. From 1482 to 1493 it was considerably remodelled.

In 1509, Jobst I of Egloffstein gave up his portion of the castle to the Prince-Bishopric of Bamberg as a fief. In 1516 Wolf I of Egloffstein gave up the last remaining freehold element of the castle in family hands to the Prince-Bishopric as a fief. The reason was probably to do with the financial plight of the lords of Egloffstein.

In spite of the constant reinforcement of its defences the castle was conquered by Nuremberg troops during the War of the Succession of Landshut in 1504 and partly razed. Scarcely had it been rebuilt when, in 1525, it became a victim of the German Peasants' War. Its rebuilding thereafter was only partial and very slow.

During the conflict between William III of Egloffstein and the Bishop of Bamberg, Veit II of Würtzburg (1561–1577), the latter had the castle occupied and ravaged in 1563.

When the village of Egloffstein was raided by the Swedes in 1632 and 1645 during the Thirty Years' War, the castle suffered severe damage necessitating comprehensive rebuilding work. In 1664, Albert Christopher of Egloffstein had a large battery tower (Geschützturm) built.

In 1703, the castle survived its last warlike occupation during the War of the Spanish Succession without great damage. Likewise, the castle suffered no destruction in the succeeding decades.

In 1750 the brothers, Albert Christopher Charles and Louis I of Egloffstein built the present parish church of St. Bartholomew in place of the lower cabinet and its old castle chapel. In 1800, the great battery tower collapsed and was carried away.

The so-called patrimonial courts (Patrimonialgericht) at Egloffstein Castle over which its free nobles presided continued until 1848. Today, the castle still belongs to the barons of Egloffstein who have also owned Kunreuth Castle since the 14th century.

== Description ==
Of the original castle site, only the main or upper ward remains. It mainly comprises the Old Cabinet (Alte Kemenate) and the Long Cabinet (Lange Kemenate). In the former are probably the oldest parts of the castle, which may date back to the 12th century. The parish church of St. Bartholomew was built in 1750 to replace the castle chapel.

Bilder der Burg

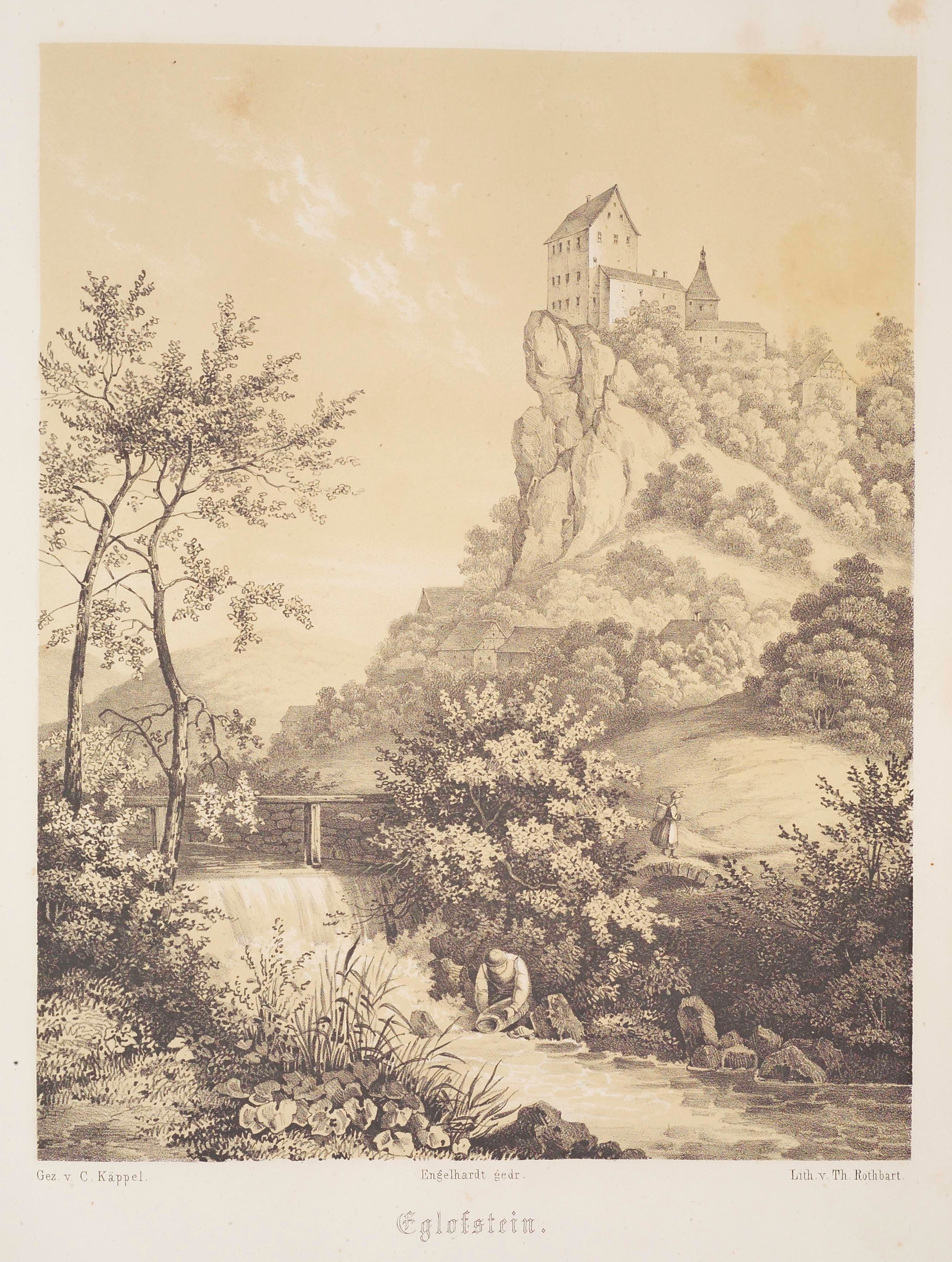
Egloffstein Castle, c. 1840 lithograph by Theodor Rothbarth based on a drawing by Carl Käppel

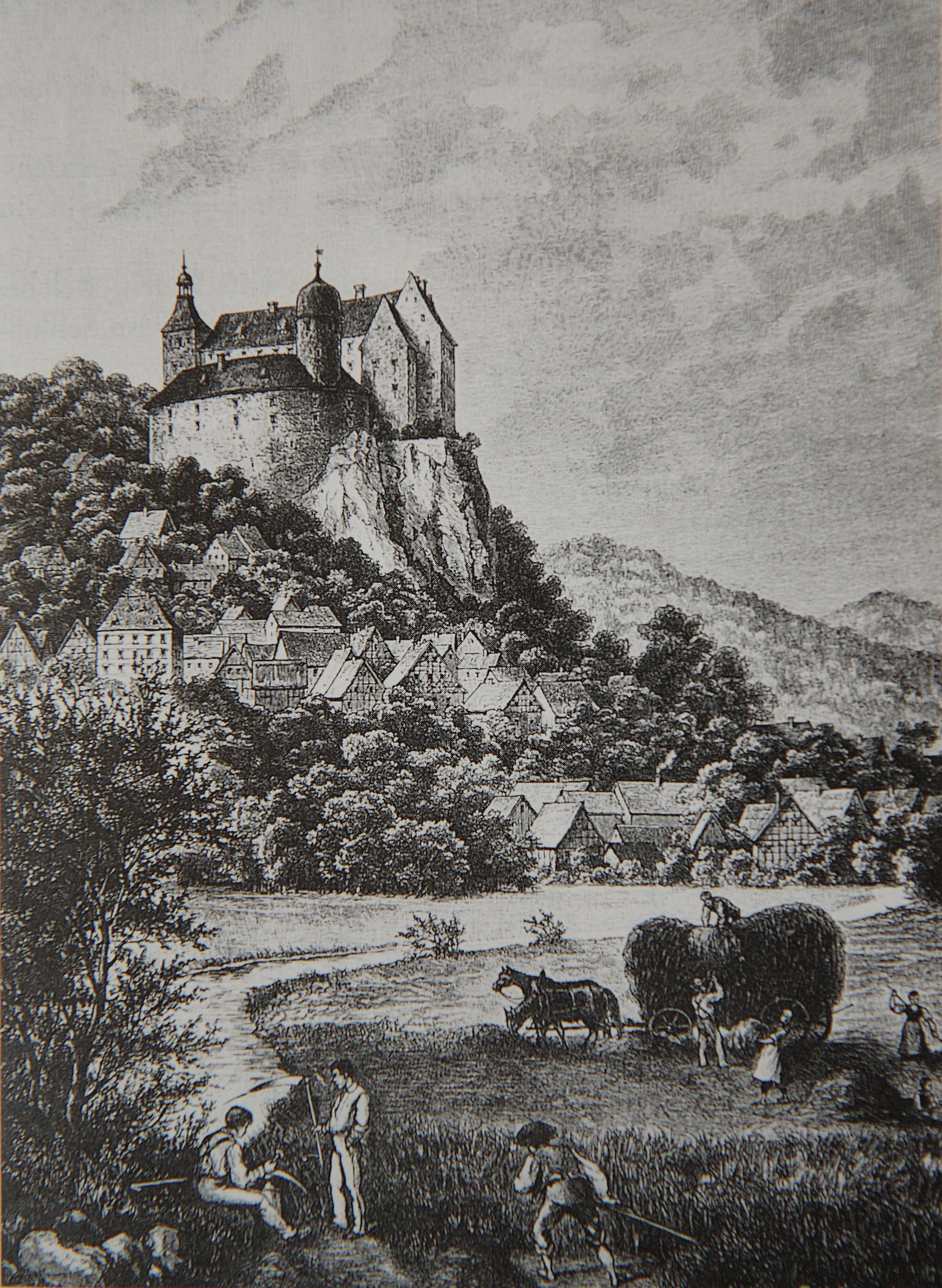
The castle and village of Egloffstein on a wood engraving by E. Hofmann (c. 1880)

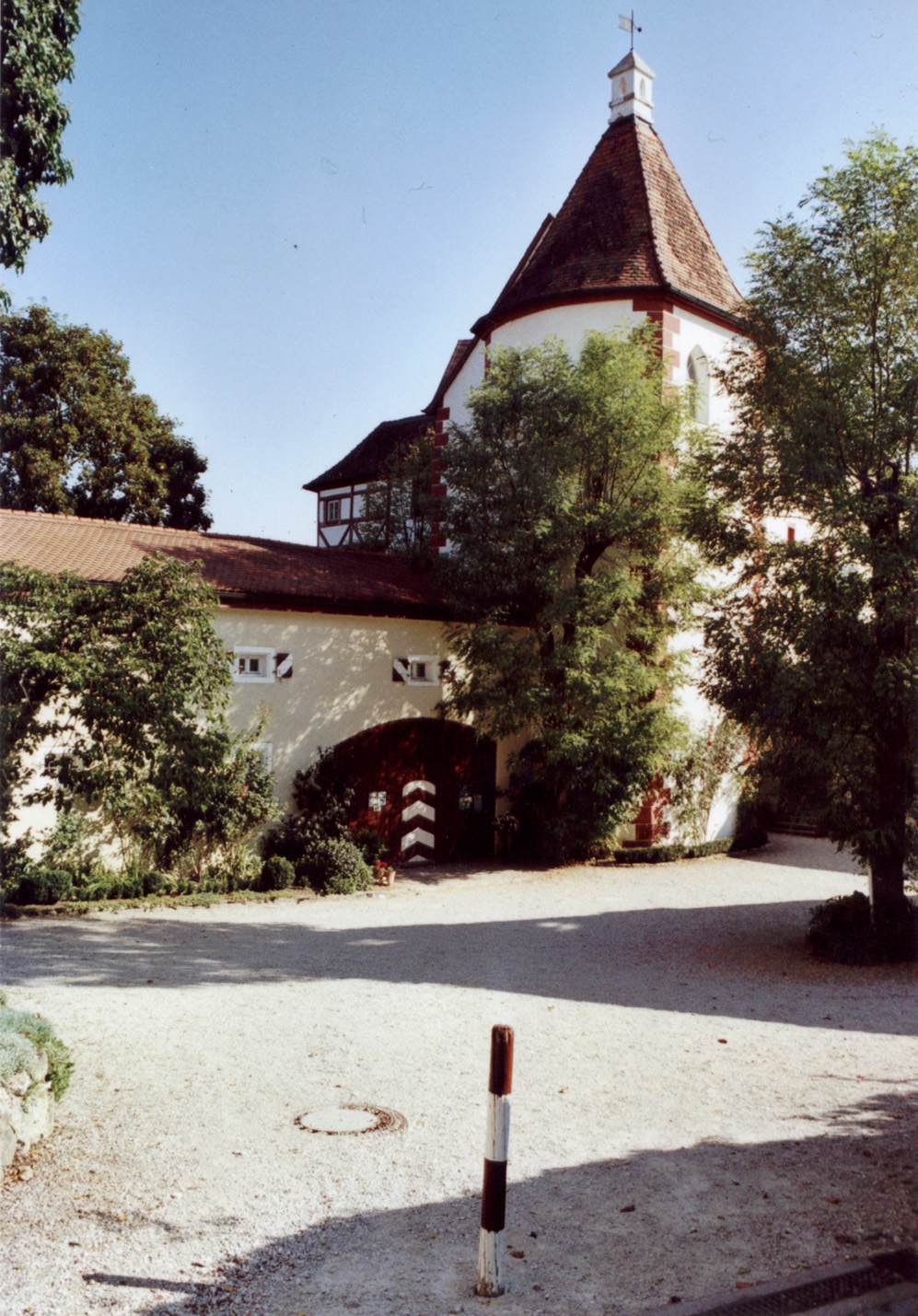
Livestock shed with gate in the old castle moat (2006)

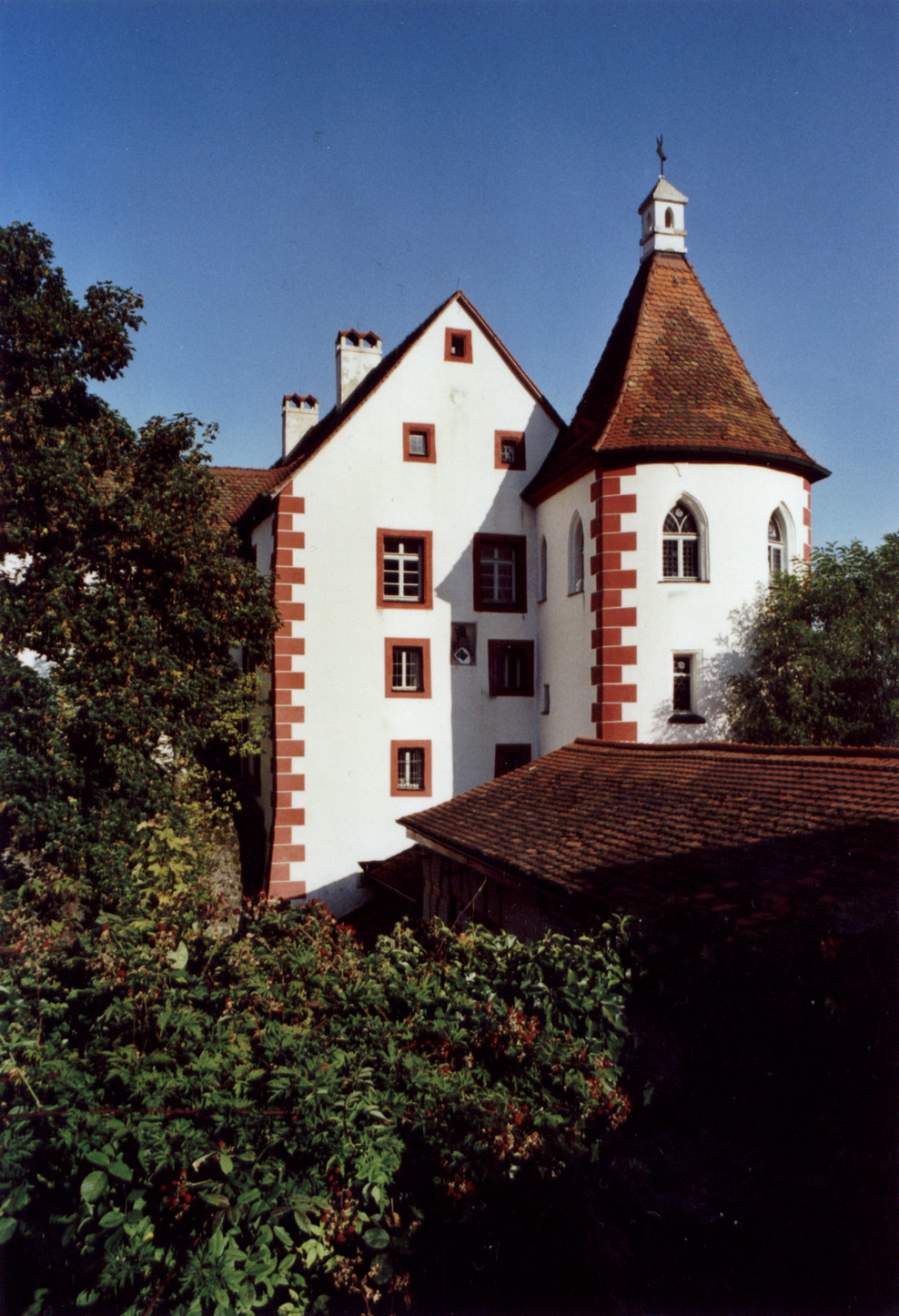
New or Long Cabinet with tower (2006)

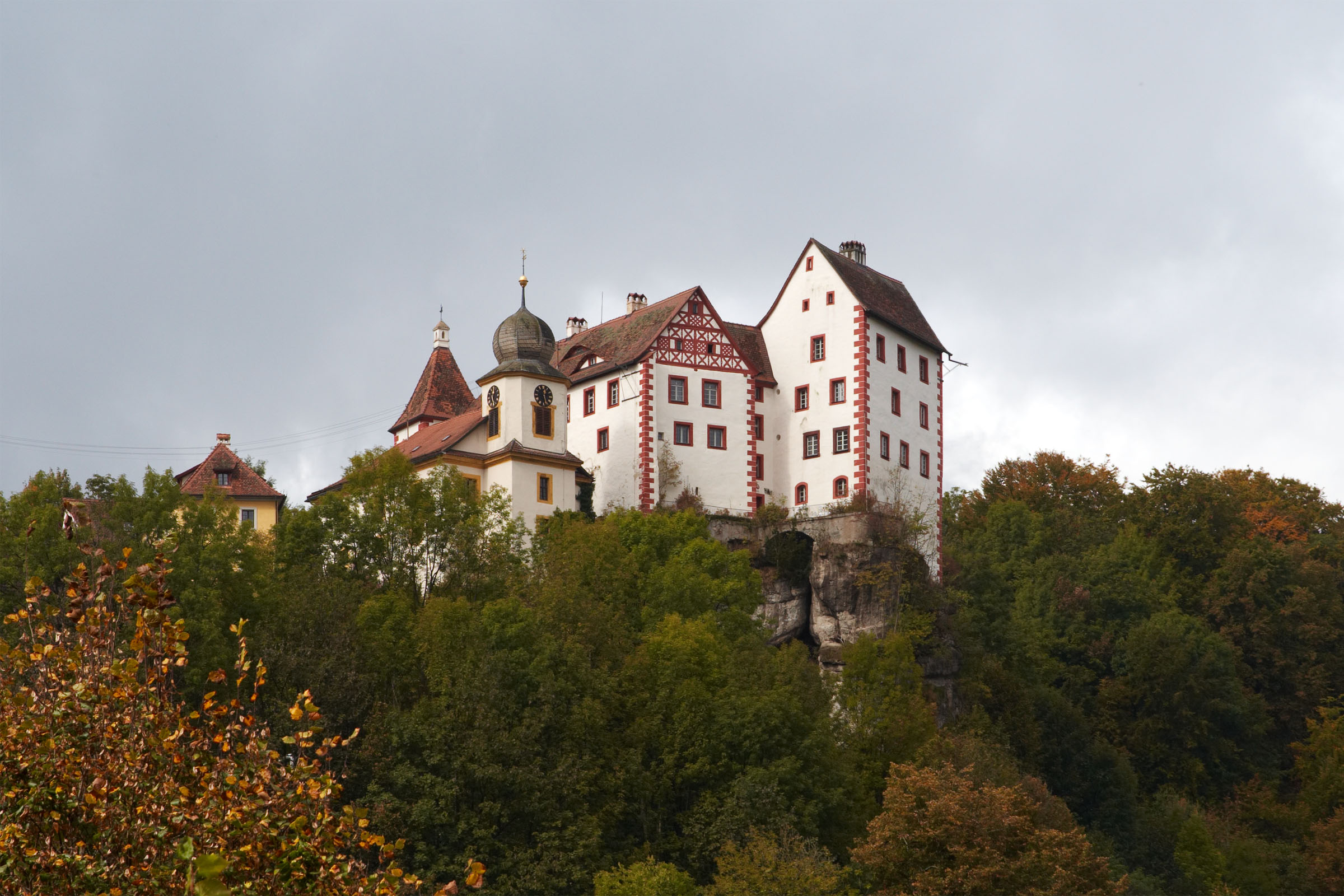
The castle seen from the west in the Trubach valley (2007)

== Literature ==
- Ursula Pfistermeister: Wehrhaftes Franken – Band 3: Burgen, Kirchenburgen, Stadtmauern um Bamberg, Bayreuth und Coburg. Fachverlag Hans Carl, Nuremberg, 2002, ISBN 3-418-00387-7, pp. 44–45.
- Walter Heinz: Ehemalige Adelssitze im Trubachtal. Verlag Palm und Enke, Erlangen und Jena, 1996, ISBN 3-7896-0554-9, pp. 130–180.
- Gustav Voit, Brigitte Kaulich, Walter Rüfer: Vom Land im Gebirg zur Fränkischen Schweiz - Eine Landschaft wird entdeckt. (Schriftenreihe des Fränkische-Schweiz-Vereins, Band 8) Verlag Palm und Enke, Erlangen, 1992, ISBN 3-7896-0511-5, pp. 99–103.
- Gustav Voit, Walter Rüfer: Eine Burgenreise durch die Fränkische Schweiz. Verlag Palm und Enke, Erlangen, 1991, ISBN 3-7896-0064-4, pp. 36–42.
- Hellmut Kunstmann: Die Burgen der südwestlichen Fränkischen Schweiz. Kommissionsverlag Degener und Co., Neustadt an der Aisch, 1990, pp. 218–229.
- Björn-Uwe Abels, Joachim Zeune, et al.: Führer zu archäologischen Denkmälern in Deutschland, Band 20: Fränkische Schweiz. Konrad Theiss Verlag, Stuttgart, 1990, ISBN 3-8062-0586-8, pp. 156–157.
- Karl Bosl [in German], ed. (1981). "Bayern". Handbuch der historischen Stätten Deutschlands [Handbook of historical sites in Germany]. Vol. 7 (3rd ed.). Stuttgart: Kröner. ISBN 3-520-27703-4.
- Toni Eckert, Susanne Fischer, Renate Freitag, Rainer Hofmann, Walter Tausendpfund: Die Burgen der Fränkischen Schweiz – Ein Kulturführer. Gürtler Druck, Forchheim o.J., ISBN 3-9803276-5-5, pp. 42–46.
