= Schlossberg Castle (Haidhof) =

Burgstall Schlossberg
- Burgstall auf der Flöss, Heidenstein
- Gräfenberg-Haidhof-Schlossberg
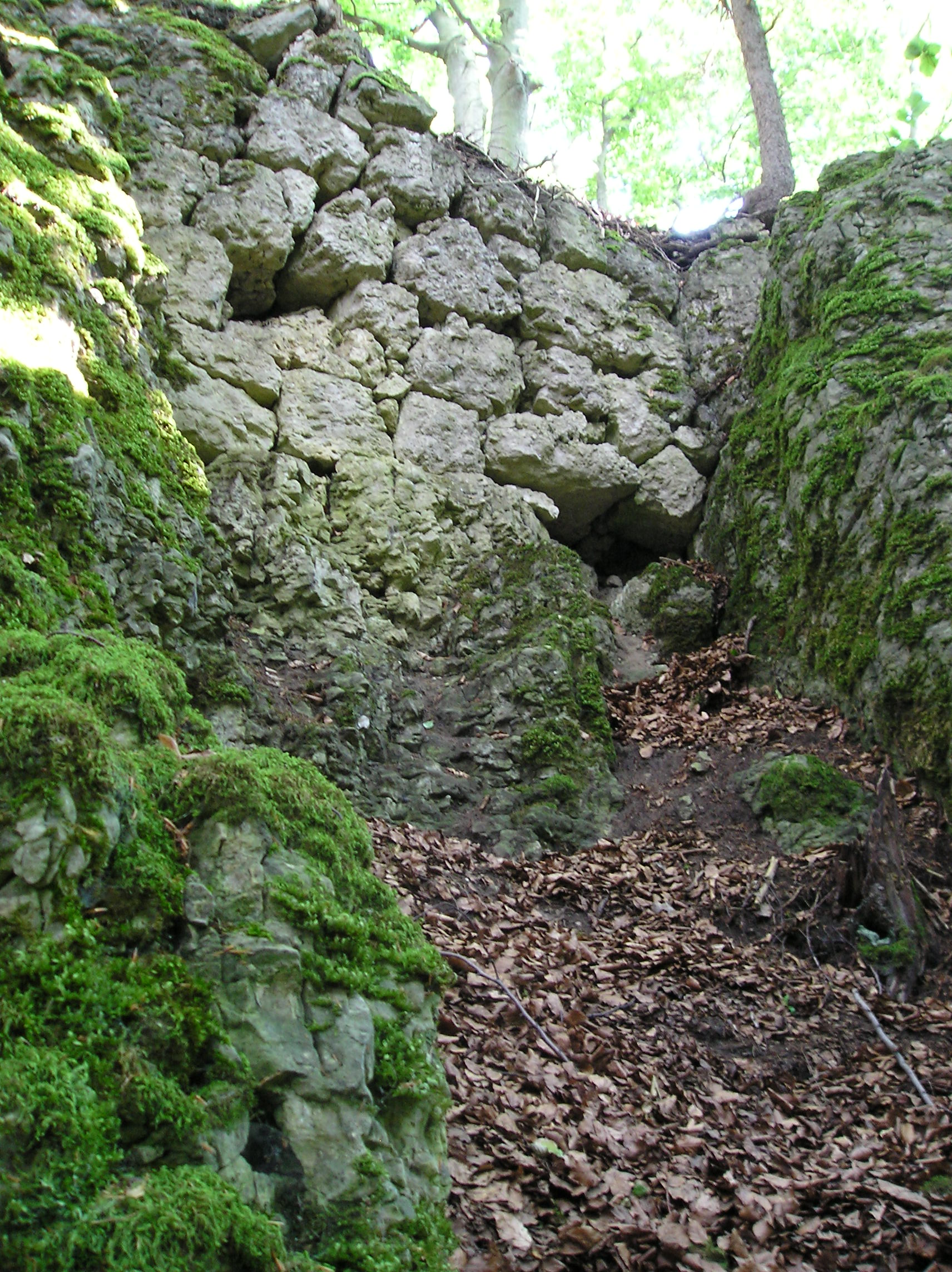
- Image 1: The last wall remains of the castle in a rock crevice

Site information
- Type: hill castle, spur castle
- Code: DE-BY
- Condition: burgstall, a few wall remains and ditches

Location
- Location within Germany
- Coordinates: 49°41′34″N 11°13′09″E
- Height: 560.1 m above sea level (NN)

Site history
- Built: probably 2nd half of the 12th C
- Materials: small ashlar construction

Garrison information
- Occupants: unknown

The burgstall of Schlossberg Castle (German: Burgstall Schlossberg), also called the Burgstall on the Flöss (Burgstall auf der Flöss) or the Heidenstein, is a now levelled, probably high mediaeval, nobleman's castle. It is situated above Haidhof, a village in the municipality of Gräfenberg in the Upper Franconian county of Forchheim in the south German state of Bavaria.

The burgstall of the old spur castle is freely accessible at all times and is used as a viewing point.

== Location ==
The burgstall is located in the Franconian Switzerland-Veldenstein Forest Nature Park at a height of 560.1 m above sea level (NN) on a rocky, southeast pointing hill spur known as the Flöss on the hill of Haidhofer Schloßberg (569 m above NN), which lies about three kilometres west-southwest of Egloffstein.

Close by are Egloffstein Castle, the ruins of Thuisbrunn Castle in the eponymous village, a possible burgstall east of Thuisbrunn and the site of Burgstein Castle on the eponymous hill of Burgstein near the village of Ortspitz.

== History ==
There are no records of the castle itself and its name is also unknown. The Nuremberg Castle researcher, Hellmut Kunstmann, dates its construction to the second half of the 12th century and it had probably fallen into decay by the early 13th century. It lay on an ancient, mediaeval road that ran from Eggolsheim via Weilersbach, Kirchehrenbach, Leutenbach, and Ortspitz, then past the castle and on to Haidhof, Thuisbrunn, and Dörnhof to join the Trubach valley road.

An indirect reference to the castle occurs in Gelegenhait der landschaft mitsampt den furten und helltten darinnen, a terrain reconnaissance by the Imperial City of Nuremberg before the Landshut War of Succession if 1504/05. This describes it as "a halt", i.e. a defensive position called an der Flöß.

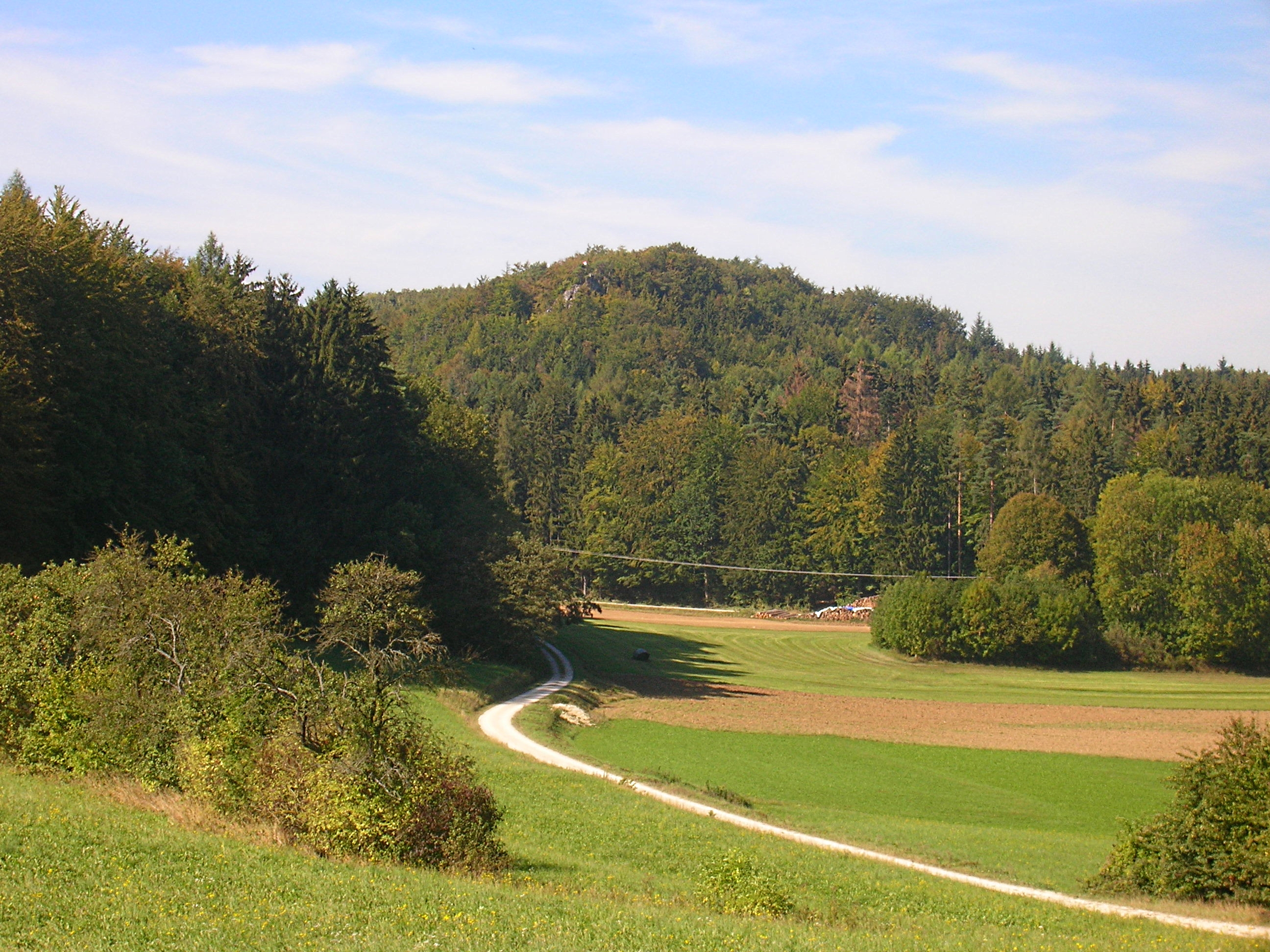
View of the Haidhofer Schloßberg with the castle rock seen from the east

The castle stood on the site of a prehistorical fortification, probably a hill settlement of the Urnfield culture of the late Hallstatt era or early La Tène period. Traces of it may be seen in the sector rampart and outer ditch west of the levelled castle.

The heritage site is described by the Bavarian State Office for Monument Protection as a "probable hill settlement of the Urnfield period and late Hallstatt or early La Tène period as well as a mediaeval burgstall". It bears monument number D-4-6333-0019.

== Description ==
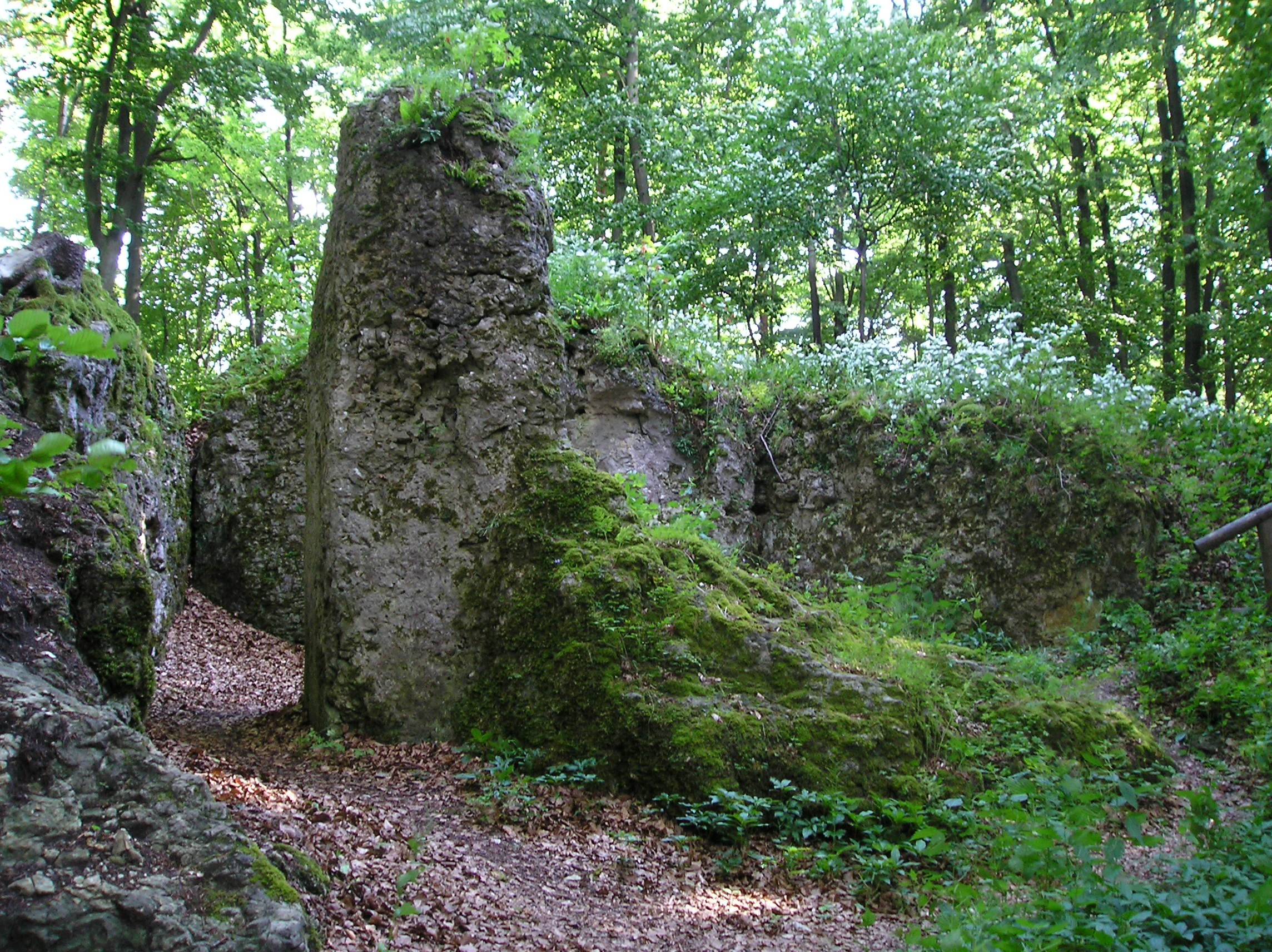
Image 2: the bridge post in the neck ditch

The old castle stood on a rocky ridge, 130 metres long but, in places, only 2 metres wide. For the first 30 metres, the ridge runs from west to east, and then bends towards the southeast. On the south is a steep hillside; the entire north side is a vertical rock face that drops for about 10 metres.

Before the castle site is a two to three-metre-deep and seven-metre-wide pit from which construction material was probably extracted for the castle.

The somewhat higher terrain of the castle was separated from the hill spur by a neck ditch that was probably not finished and into which steps descend. The ditch runs from north to south and ends after crossing about two thirds of the width of the spur; the remaining third is probably still in its natural state. It is four metres deep and about as wide. There is a similar situation in Ahorntal at the burgstall on the Kandelberg near Körzendorf. There, too, the neck ditch was started, albeit from both sides, but not completed. In the middle of the hill ridge a navigable section was left that facilitated the transportation of building material to the castle construction site. Between the ditch and the castle a terrace may still be seen that probably acted as a zwinger.

In the northern part of the neck ditch of the castle near Haidhof a rock pinnacle was left standing (Image 2). This pinnacle, sometimes called the Opferstein ("Sacrifice Rock") acted as a bridge pier. Up to the pinnacle there was probably a fixed bridge; beyond the pillar a sloping drawbridge would have led up to the castle entrance.

At the entrance to the castle, about 5.5 metres beyond the ditch in wooded terrain, is the outline of a square building with sides about 12 metres long. According to Kunstmann the wall thickness was about one metre. The southern half of the building was probably cellared, as is evinced by the vertically hewn rock face. The castle access ran over the bridge and then north past the probably tower-like building into the outer ward. The last remaining large section of surviving wall is in a rock crevice on the north side of the outer ward (Image 1). The three-metre-high retaining wall consists of five layers of hewn stone ashlars that are up to 50 centimetres wide.

On the rest of the terrain of the inner ward, apart from manmade markings on the rock, there are no other traces of buildings. The inner ward is separated from the main ward by a second neck ditch, four metres deep and three metres wide. It is crossed by a wooden footbridge where there was once probably a drawbridge. Immediately after the sector ditch, rock markings indicate that there was a gatehouse here. Beyond that are the collapsed wall remains of a roughly five-metre-wide building.

The last section of the castle at the tip of the spur consisted of a plateau, 5 by 12 metres in area, on which not a single trace of any walls can be seen and which is now a viewing point.

== Literature ==
- Walter Heinz: Ehemalige Adelssitze im Trubachtal. Verlag Palm und Enke, Erlangen/Jena, 1996, ISBN 3-7896-0554-9, pp. 120-129.
- Hellmut Kunstmann: Die Burgen der südwestlichen Fränkischen Schweiz. Kommissionsverlag Degener & Co., Neustadt an der Aisch, 1990, ISBN 3-86652-928-7, pp. 236-238.
