= Burggraf (fortification) =

Ancient German sector fortification

- Burggrafenstein, Furchste
- Gräfenberg-Thuisbrunn-"Burggraf"
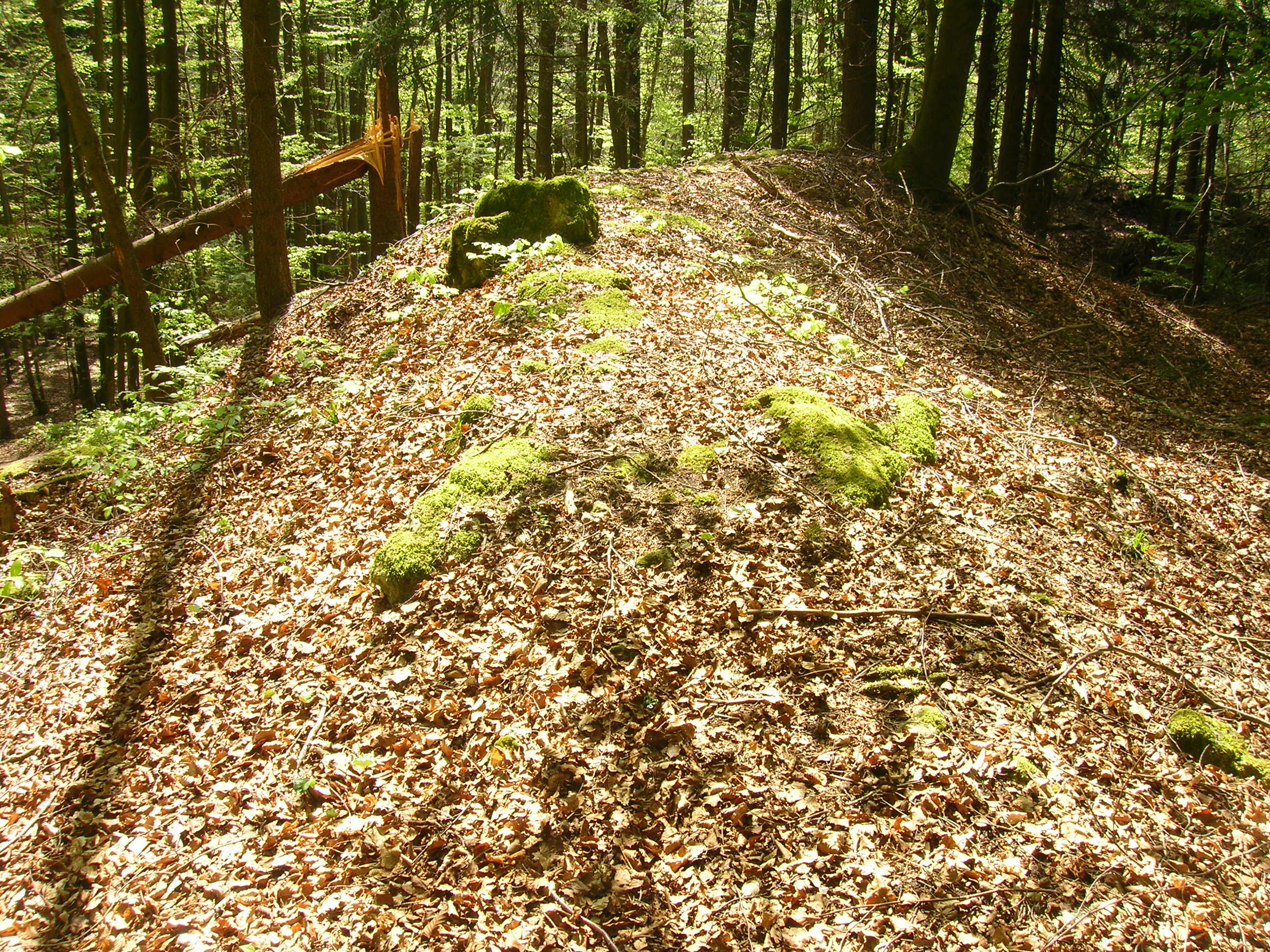
- The Burggraf

Site information
- Type: hill castle, spur castle
- Code: DE-BY
- Condition: burgstall (no above-ground ruins)

Location
- Location within Germany
- Coordinates: 49°40′54″N 11°16′56″E
- Height: Height missing, see template documentation

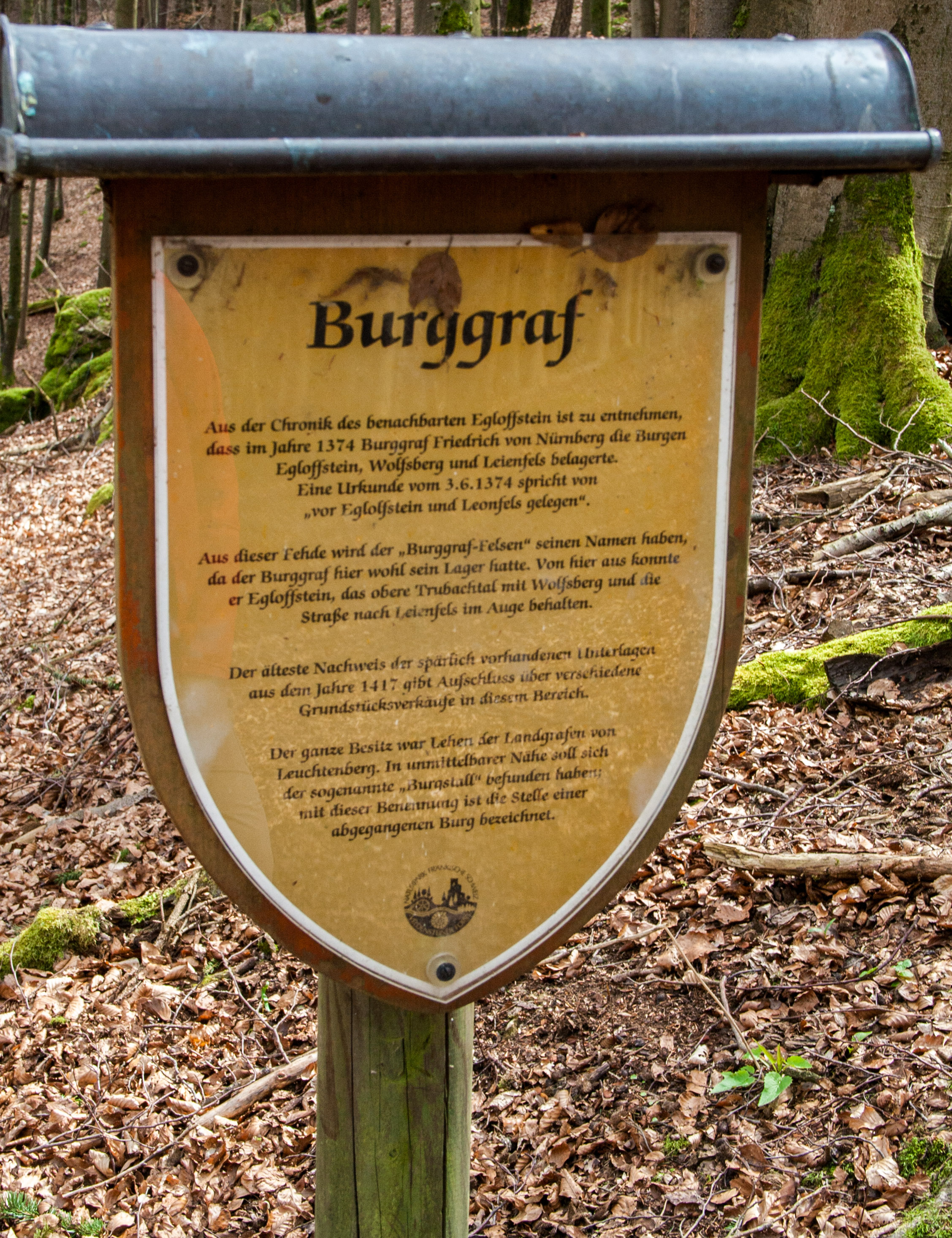
Burggraf information board

The fortification of Burggraf (German: Abschnittsbefestigung Burggraf), also called the Burggrafenstein or Furchste, is a levelled prehistorical or early medieval sector fortification on a hill spur between Untertrubach and Dörnhof near Gräfenberg in the county of Forchheim in the south German state of Bavaria.

The fortification was recorded in 1417 as a burgstall. It consisted of ramparts and an entrance passage at the southwest corner and probably a second on the southeast side. Only the remains of two sector ramparts have survived.

== Literature ==
- Walter Heinz: Ehemalige Adelssitze im Trubachtal. Verlag Palm und Enke, Erlangen und Jena, 1996, ISBN 3-7896-0554-9
