= War of the Cities (1387–1389) =

War in South Germany

War of the cities
Date	1387–1389
Location	South Germany
Result	Victory of the nobility, Landfrieden of Eger: Dissolution of the Swabian League of Cities; Hostilities resume in 1390 with a new league of cities

Belligerents
Duchy of Bavaria Holy Roman Empire	Swabian League of Cities Holy Roman Empire

The War of the Cities (German: Städtekrieg) began as a war between the Swabian League of Cities and the Bavarian dukes 1387−1389. It evolved into a war of influence between the nobility and free cities.

== Background ==
The Free imperial cities in the south of the Holy Roman Empire aimed towards defending their liberties against the territorial expanding states of Bavaria, Austria and Württemberg. The trigger for the war was a pact between the Swabian League of Cities and the archbishop of Salzburg, Pilgrim von Puchheim, both antagonists of Bavaria. This pact would have surrounded Bavaria from two sides. Bavaria took the Bishop captive and demanded the dissolution of the pact. German king Wenceslaus IV of Bohemia declared a Reichskrieg (ger. war of the realm) against Bavaria.

== Aftermath ==
Originating from a regional conflict, the war developed into a decision of the future role of king, nobility and cities in the Holy Roman Empire. The war featured two major battles at Döffingen on August 23, 1388 and Worms on November 3, 1388. The Swabian League was defeated in both battles.

After three years of brutal war, which included south Germany in its entirety, the war ended with the Landfrieden of Eger on 5. May 1389 at the expense of the cities. The Swabian League of Cities was forbidden and dissolved. The cities had to pay war reparations and take other drawbacks. The conflicts couldn't be settled by this unjust peace and 1390 a new league of cities was founded.
