= Götz Freiherr von Pölnitz =

German social historian, economic historian and archivist

Hieronymus Christoph Jan Eugen Franz Gottfried Maria Freiherr von Pölnitz, known as Götz Freiherr von Pölnitz (11 December 1906 in Munich – 9 November 1967 in Erlangen) was a German social historian, economic historian and archivist.
