= Swabian League of Cities =

14th-century military alliance

Swabian League
- Schwäbischer Städtebund
- Named after: Swabia
- Formation: July 4, 1376
- Founder: Free Imperial City of Ulm
- Dissolved: May 5, 1389
- Type: Military alliance
- Location: Holy Roman Empire
- Region served: Southern Germany
- Official language: German

The Swabian League of Cities (German: Schwäbischer Städtebund) was a political and military alliance formed in 1376, initially of 14 Swabian imperial cities under the leadership of Ulm that lasted until 1389. Through alliances with the Rhenish League of Cities and Swiss imperial cities and the admission of other Swabian and Franconian imperial cities, the league grew to 40 members. The purpose of the alliance was primarily to secure imperial city rights.

== Origins ==
As early as the 13th century, cities in the empire had been forming alliances with one another, often involving princes, counts or knights. While these were initially temporary protection and assistance agreements to safeguard security and economic interests, these city alliances increasingly developed a decidedly autonomous stance vis-à-vis the imperial authorities. The Esslingen League of Cities, founded by 22 southern German cities in 1331, was formed as a means of imperial peace policy with the express consent of Louis IV. After Louis's death, cities in Swabia agreed that in future they would only decide jointly on the recognition of a newly elected king and that they would support one another if a new ruler tried to mortgage a city. With these were agreements to jointly defend against royal attacks on the urban imperial freedom and to reach a consensual decision on the legitimacy of the monarchy.

== History ==
=== Formation ===
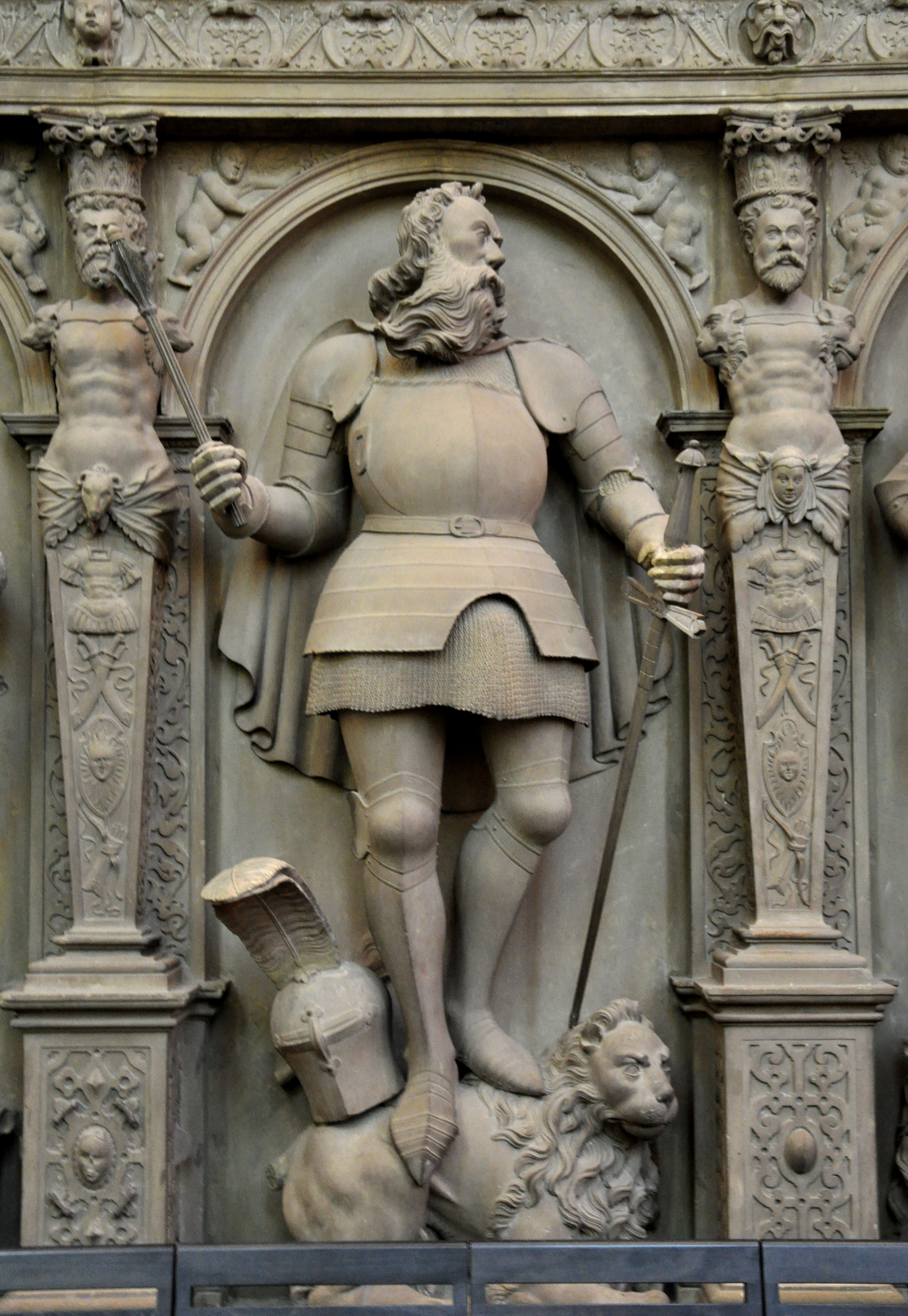
Ulrich von Württemberg tried to crush the League at Reutlingen.

The defeat of the city league by Eberhard II, Count of Württemberg, in 1372, the murder of the captain of the league, and the breach of his obligations by Charles IV led to the formation of a new league of 14 Swabian cities on 4 July 1376. These were led by Ulm. The others were Biberach, Buchhorn, Isny, Constance, Leutkirch, Lindau, Memmingen, Ravensburg, Reutlingen, Rottweil, St. Gallen, Überlingen, and Wangen. The alliance of the 14 held together for four years from 1376. In August 1377, they were joined by Dinkelsbühl, an imperial city on the edge of Franconia, to the north-east of the Swabian region. Dinkelsbühl was followed by cities from the Franconian heartland such as Rothenburg ob der Tauber and Windsheim.

=== Battle of Reutlingen ===
The emperor refused to recognise the newly revitalised Swabian League, seeing it as a rebellion. This led to an "imperial war" against the league. The renewed league triumphed at the Battle of Reutlingen on 14 May 1377 over an army led by Ulrich von Württemberg. Ulrich was the son of Eberhard II of Württemberg, who was an enthusiastic backer of the emperor's confrontational approach to the Swabian League of Cities. The emperor now became more conciliatory. On 31 May 1377, he lifted the ban he had imposed on the League and set up an arbitration court, which was rapidly extended over the Rhineland, Bavaria, and Franconia.

The power and extent of the Swabian League peaked during the first half of the 1380s, with the number of member cities reaching 32 by 1385. After a couple of decades when things had begun to stabilize a little after the outbreak of plague that had devastated populations and abruptly distorted economic relationships through most of western Europe during the first half of the 1350s, old tensions were again becoming more apparent.

=== Merger ===
On 20 March 1381, the Rhenish league of cities (der Rheinischer Städtebund), another alliance of cities in the area, came into being. Its member cities were located west of the core Swabian League members. They included some of the largest and most powerful independent cities on and near to the banks of the Rhine, including Frankfurt, Mainz, Worms, Speyer, and Strasbourg. This alliance came into being to counter the threat of the “Löwenbund”, an association of princes and lesser nobility.

On 17 June 1381, the Rhenish league of cities and the Swabian League of Cities came together to create the South German league of cities (der Süddeutscher Städtebund), a military alliance bound by pledges of mutual assistance. The South German league had additional members such as Basel and Wil. The warlords reacted six days later with the creation of the Rhenish Alliance of Prince-Electors, and set about obtaining royal recognition of it. In 1381, the League of Cities conducted a war against the Löwenbund in Franconia. Augsburg, Ulm, and Schwäbisch Hall meanwhile undertook a military push into the nobles' territories.

=== Dissolution ===
Württemberg struck back and, uniting with the forces of Elector Palatine Rupert I and the Nuremberg Burgrave Frederick V of Hohenzollern, defeating the Swabian League of Cities in 1388 at Döffingen. On 5 May 1389, the league disbanded according to the resolutions of the Reichstag at Eger.

== Charter members ==
- Biberach
- Buchhorn
- Constance
- Isny
- Leutkirch
- Lindau
- Memmingen
- Ravensburg
- Reutlingen
- Rottweil
- St. Gallen
- Überlingen
- Ulm
- Wangen
