= Thuisbrunn =

Coordinates: 49°41′18″N 11°14′58″E

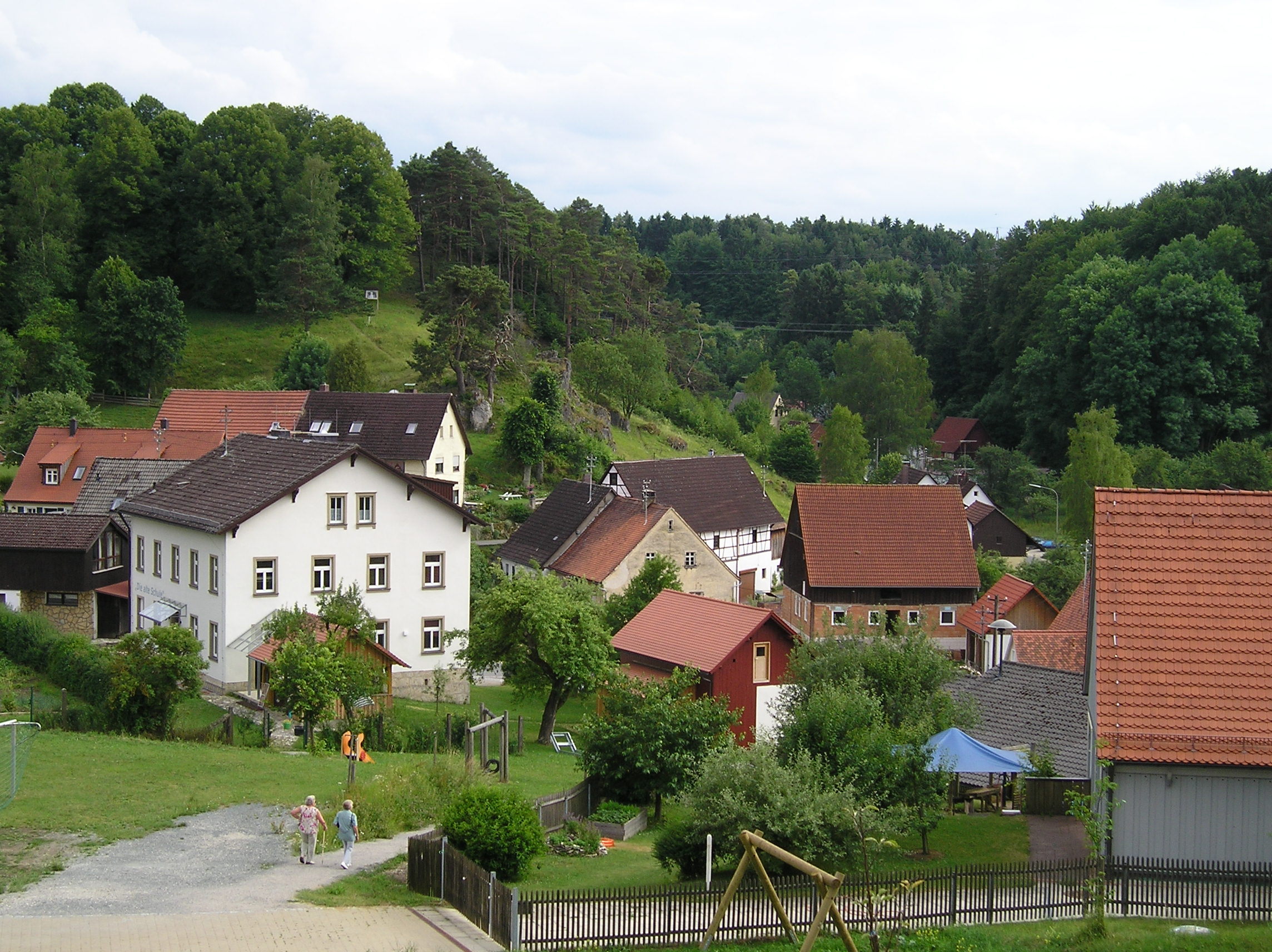
View from the church in Thuisbrunn over the valley to Pinselleite

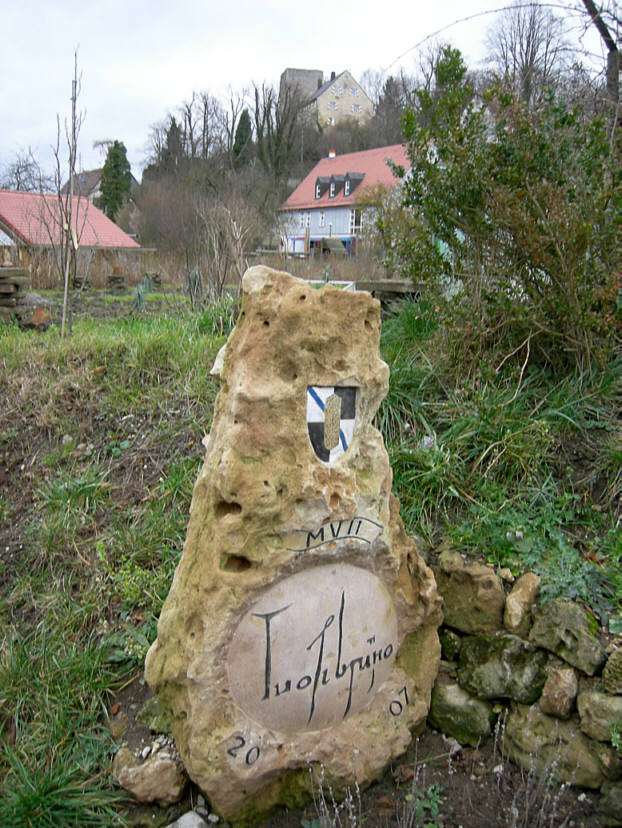
1000 year anniversary monument in Thuisbrunn

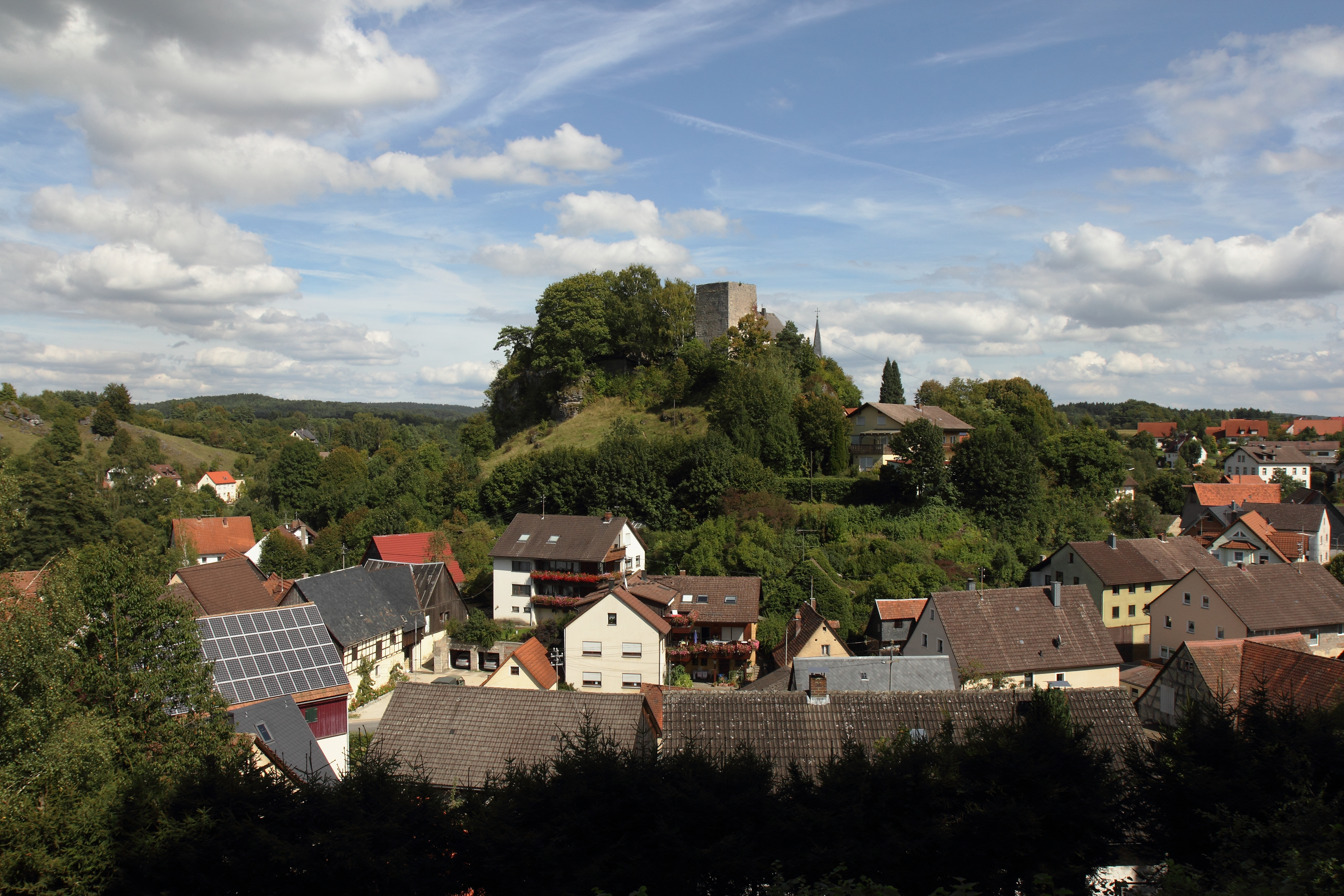
Thuisbrunn Castle ruins

Thuisbrunn is a village in the municipality of Gräfenberg and lies in the region of Franconian Switzerland in Germany.

== History ==
In 1007 Emperor Henry II gifted the town of Forchheim and its surrounding villages to the Bishopric of Bamberg. Among the outlying villages was Tuosibruno, present-day Thuisbrunn. The village thus has a thousand-year-old history. In 1403 it was promised to the Nuremberg burgrave, John III.

From 1403 to 1803 Thuisbrunn belonged to the Principality of Brandenburg-Culmbach-Bayreuth. In 1449, during the First Margrave War, the village and castle were largely burned down. In 1450 the village came under the rule of the noble family of the Egloffsteins. After the Reformation the village became Protestant. In the First and Second Margrave Wars the village and castle were destroyed again. Since then the castle has been a ruin, only one building was used as a vogtei. In 1803 Thuisbrunn went to the Electorate of Bavaria. The Vogt's house became a state forestry office.

On 1 May 1978, the formerly independent parish was incorporated as part of the district reform into Gräfenberg, along with the villages of Haidhof, Hohenschwärz, Neusles, Höfles and Dörnhof. The remaining element of the parish went to Obertrubach.

The former coat of arms was approved in 1971 and designed by herald, Karl Haas of Kronach. It is described as follows: Geviert von Silber und Schwarz mit einem schmalen blauen Wellbalken, belegt mit einem goldenen Quaderturm.

== Sights ==
The sights of Thuisbrunn include its neogothic church dating to 1857 and the ruins of Thuisbrunn Castle.

The valley of Todsfelder Tal to the west.

== Brewery ==
The village is home to the Elchbräu private brewery which re-opened in 2007.

=== Five Seidla Trail ===
The Five Seidla Trail (Fünf-Seidla-Steig) ends here. This is a hiking trail, opened in 2008, between the four breweries of the municipality of Gräfenberg and Weißenohe Abbey Brewery. It is named after the Franconian beer mug, the Seidla. The breweries produce 21 different beers between them.

== Literature ==
- Hans Vollet und Kathrin Heckel: Die Ruinenzeichnungen des Plassenburgkartographen Johann Christoph Stierlein. 1987.
