= Thuisbrunn Castle =

- Gräfenberg-Thuisbrunn
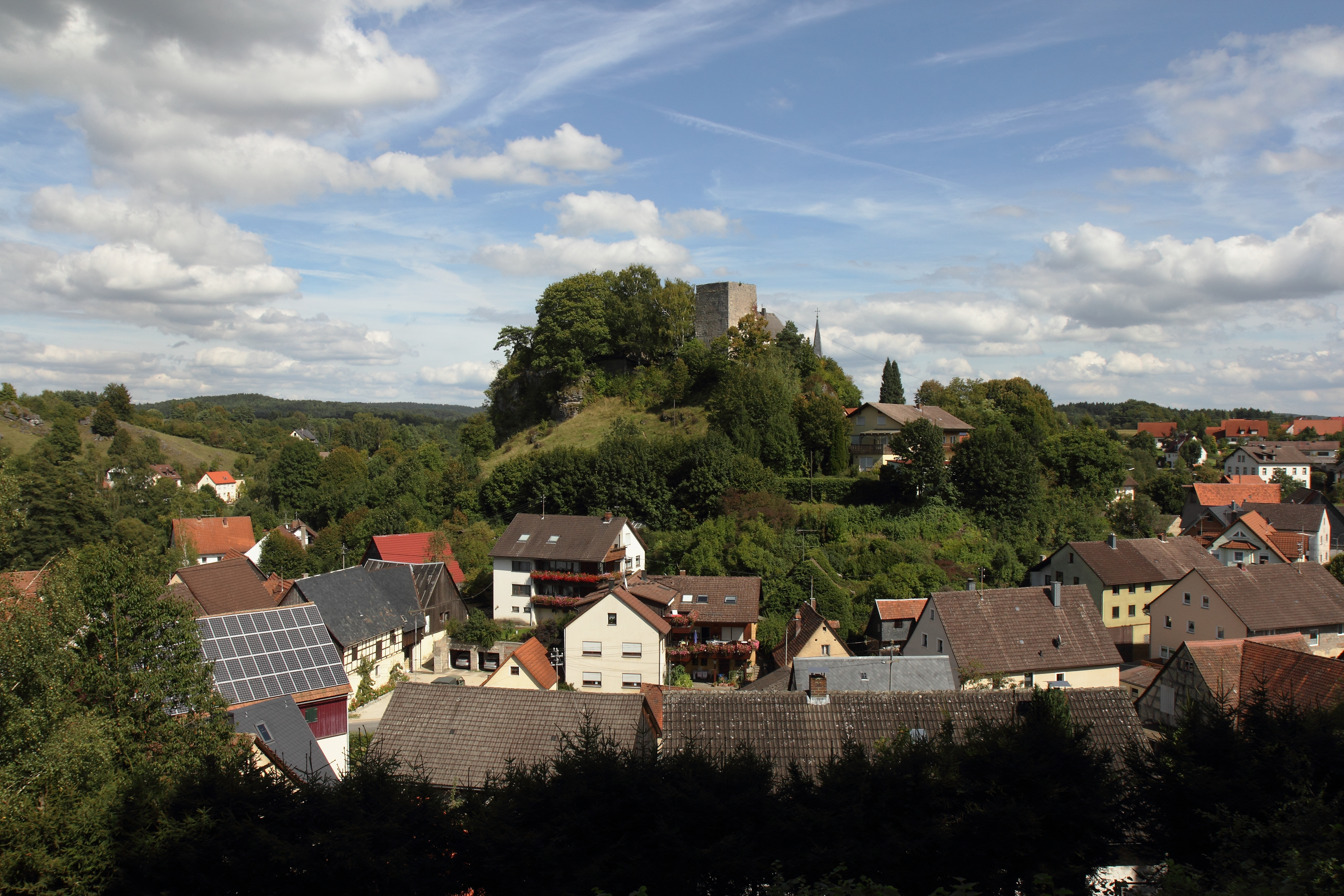
- View of the ruins including the bergfried from the west (Aug 2014)

Site information
- Type: Hill castle, summit site
- Code: DE-BY
- Condition: ruin

Location
- Location within Bavaria Location within Germany
- Coordinates: 49°41′18″N 11°14′51″E
- Height: 470 m above sea level (NN)

Site history
- Built: Before 1348
- Materials: Ashlar walls

Garrison information
- Occupants: Imperial ministeriales

Thuisbrunn Castle (German: Burg Thuisbrunn) is located centrally within the parish of Thuisbrunn in the municipality of Gräfenberg in the Bavarian province of Upper Franconia. After having been destroyed and rebuilt several times, the castle is now in private ownership.

== History ==
The spur castle was first mentioned in 1348 and Lord Hiltpolt of Mayenthal named as the castle lord (Burgherr) of Thuisbrunn. In 1388, during the South German War of the Cities, it was destroyed by Nuremberg troops and thereafter given to the burgraves of Nuremberg as a fief. In 1420 the castle was again wrecked during the Bavarian War by troops of Duke Louis of Ingolstadt. However, when the village of Thuisbrunn was destroyed in July 1449 by Nuremberg soldiers and again in 1460 during the Princes' War, the castle remained undamaged. In 1553, during the Second Margrave War, the castle was once more destroyed by Nuremberg troops. By 1558 only the district office (Amtshaus) and the bergfried had been rebuilt. During the Thirty Years' War and thereafter, Thuisbrunn and the castle were plundered seven times by Imperial, Swedish and Bavarian soldiers. In 1667, the Vogtei office was probably built in place of the old district office; apart from this house and the bergfried the castle remained a ruin. In 1816, the cartographer, Johann Christoph Stierlein, made for the first time a very precise map of the castle area and its surviving buildings. Following the seizure of the estates by the Kingdom of Bavaria in 1806 during the Napoleonic Era, the Vogtei office was used as a forestry office. Towards the end of the Second World War the castle was shelled by American troops. In 1961 it was sold into private ownership.

== Gallery ==
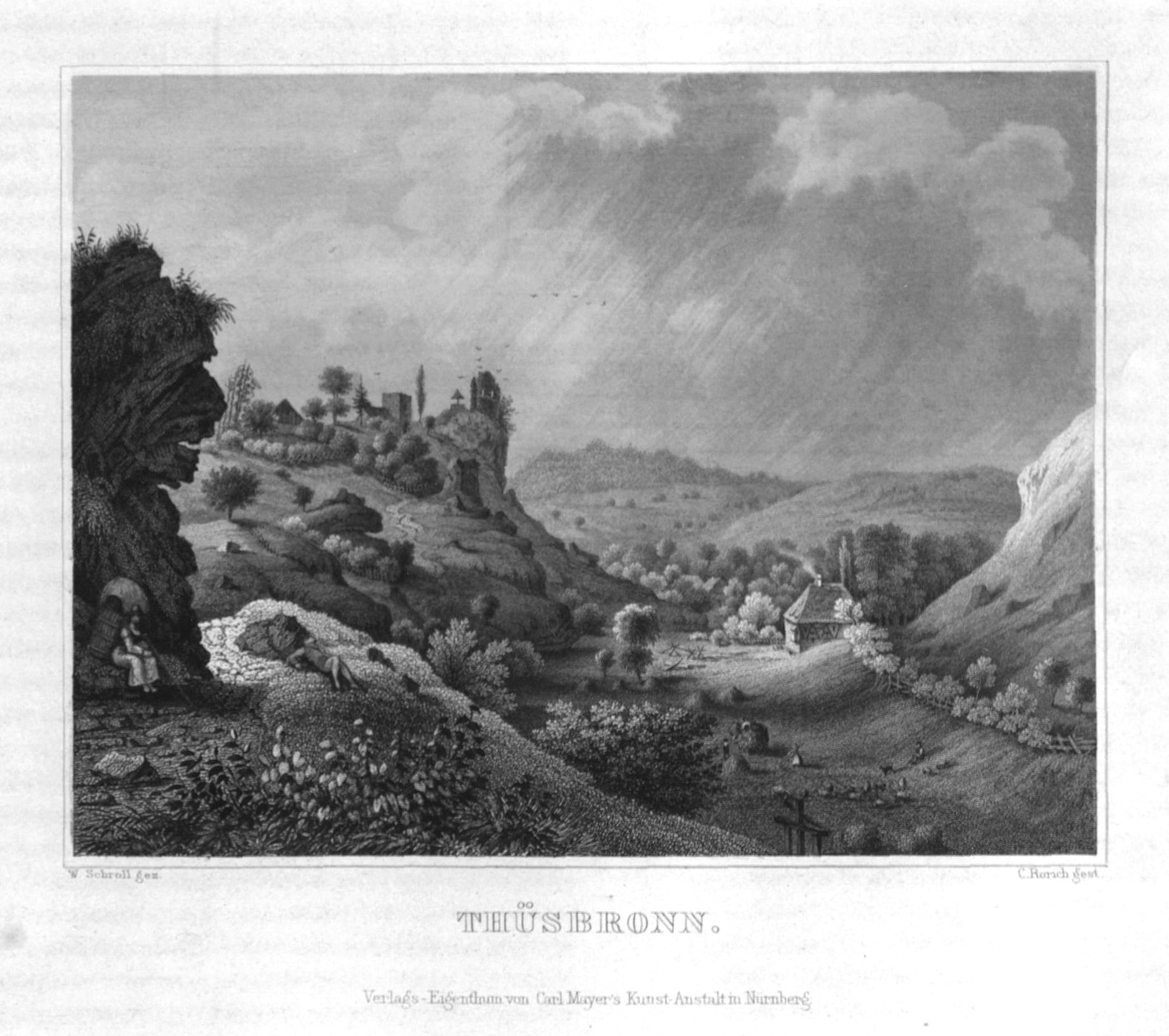
Thuisbrunn and its castle. 1858 steel engraving

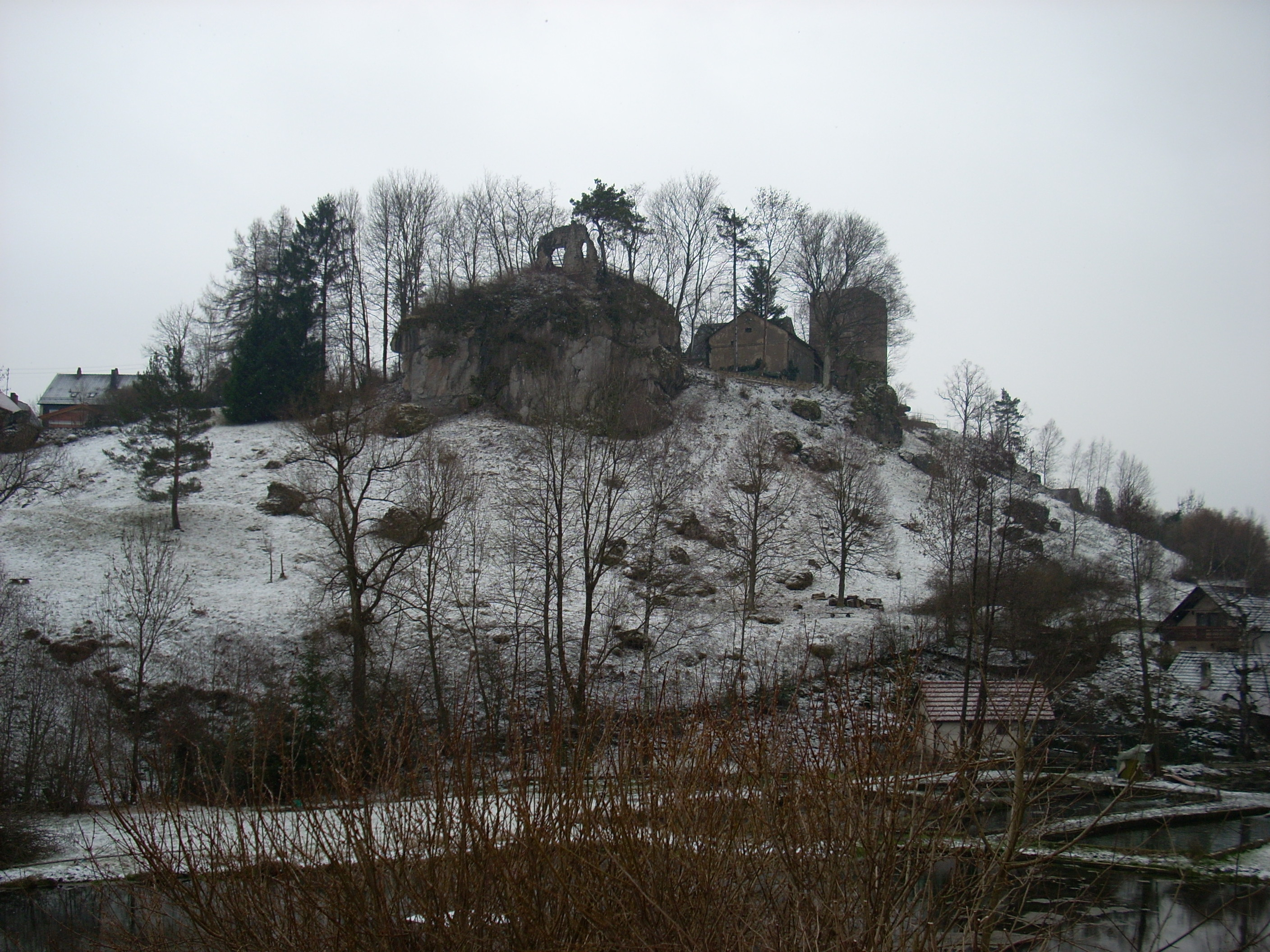
View of the ruins from the north. On the rocks, the wall remains of a castle building are visible (Apr 2009)

== Literature ==
- Walter Heinz: Ehemalige Adelssitze im Trubachtal. Verlag Palm und Enke, Erlangen and Jena, 1996, ISBN 3-7896-0554-9, pp. 99–112.
- Björn-Uwe Abels, Joachim Zeune, et al.: Führer zu archäologischen Denkmälern in Deutschland. Band 20: Fränkische Schweiz. Konrad Theiss Verlag, Stuttgart, 1990, ISBN 3-8062-0586-8, p. 224.
- Hellmut Kunstmann: Die Burgen der südwestlichen Fränkischen Schweiz. Kommissionsverlag Degener & Co., Neustadt/Aisch, 1990, pp. 229–235.
- Gustav Voit, Walter Rüfer: Eine Burgenreise durch die Fränkische Schweiz. Verlag Palm und Enke, Erlangen, 1991, ISBN 3-7896-0064-4, pp. 184–187.
- Toni Eckert, Susanne Fischer, Renate Freitag, Rainer Hofmann, Walter Tausendpfund: Die Burgen der Fränkischen Schweiz: Ein Kulturführer. Gürtler Druck, Forchheim o. J., ISBN 3-9803276-5-5, pp. 148–151.
