= Egloffstein =

- Municipality
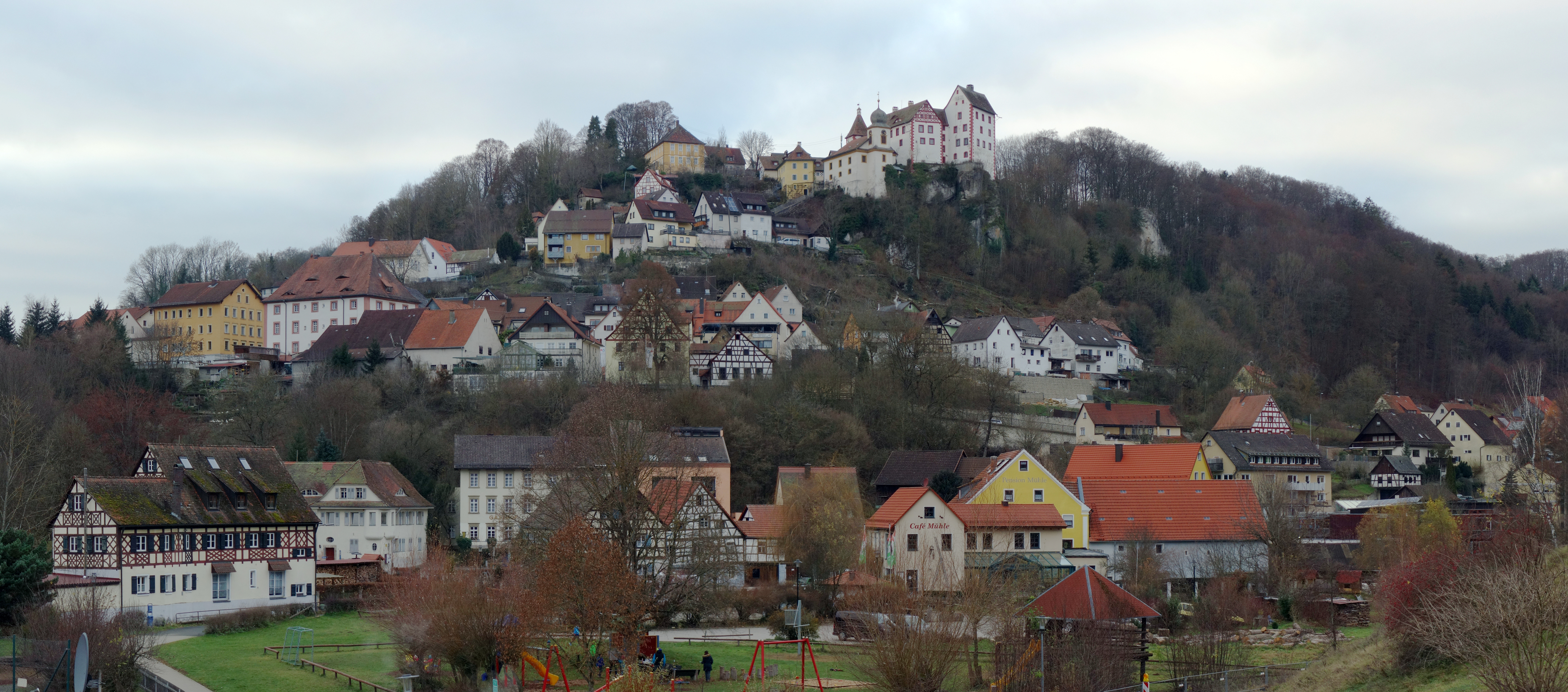
- View from the east

- Coat of arms

- Location of Egloffstein within Forchheim district
- Interactive map of Egloffstein
- Location within Germany Location within Bavaria
- Coordinates: 49°42′N 11°15′E
- Country: Germany
- State: Bavaria
- Admin. region: Oberfranken
- District: Forchheim
- Subdivisions: 8 Ortsteile

Government
  - Mayor (2020–26): Stefan Förtsch

Area
  - Total: 28.04 km^{2} (10.83 sq mi)
- Elevation: 350–450 m (1,150–1,480 ft)

Population (2025-12-31)
  - Total: 2,064
  - Density: 73.61/km^{2} (190.6/sq mi)
- Time zone: UTC+01:00 (CET)
  - Summer (DST): UTC+02:00 (CEST)
- Postal codes: 91349
- Dialling codes: 09197
- Vehicle registration: FO
- Website: www.egloffstein.de

Egloffstein is a municipality in the district of Forchheim in Bavaria in Germany.

== Geography ==
=== Location ===
The village of Egloffstein is a state-recognised climatic spa and lies in the valley of the Trubach river on the hillside beneath the eponymous castle.

=== Neighbouring communities ===
Its neighbouring communities (clockwise from the north) are:

Gößweinstein, Obertrubach, Gräfenberg, Leutenbach, Pretzfeld

=== Administrative subdivisions ===
Egloffstein is divided into 16 parishes:

- Affalterthal
- Äpfelbach
- Bärenthal
- Bieberbach
- Dietersberg
- Egloffstein
- Egloffsteinerhüll
- Hammerbühl
- Hammermühle
- Hammerthoos
- Hundsboden
- Hundshaupten
- Mostviel
- Rothenhof
- Schlehenmühle
- Schweinthal
- Affalterthal above Egloffstein in the upper part of the Mostvieler valley.
- Bieberbach is well known for its great Osterbrunnen. In 2005, however, it had to concede its title as the "Greatest Osterbrunnen in the World" to Sulzbach-Rosenberg. The village is first recorded in 1225.
- Hundshaupten is known for its wildlife enclosure and petting zoo, and for the castle of Hundshaupten.

== Attractions ==
Above the village stands the former mediaeval Egloffstein Castle of the lords of Egloffstein.

There is an open-air swimming pool that dates to before the war.
