= Ehrenbürg =

Butte in Bavaria, Germany

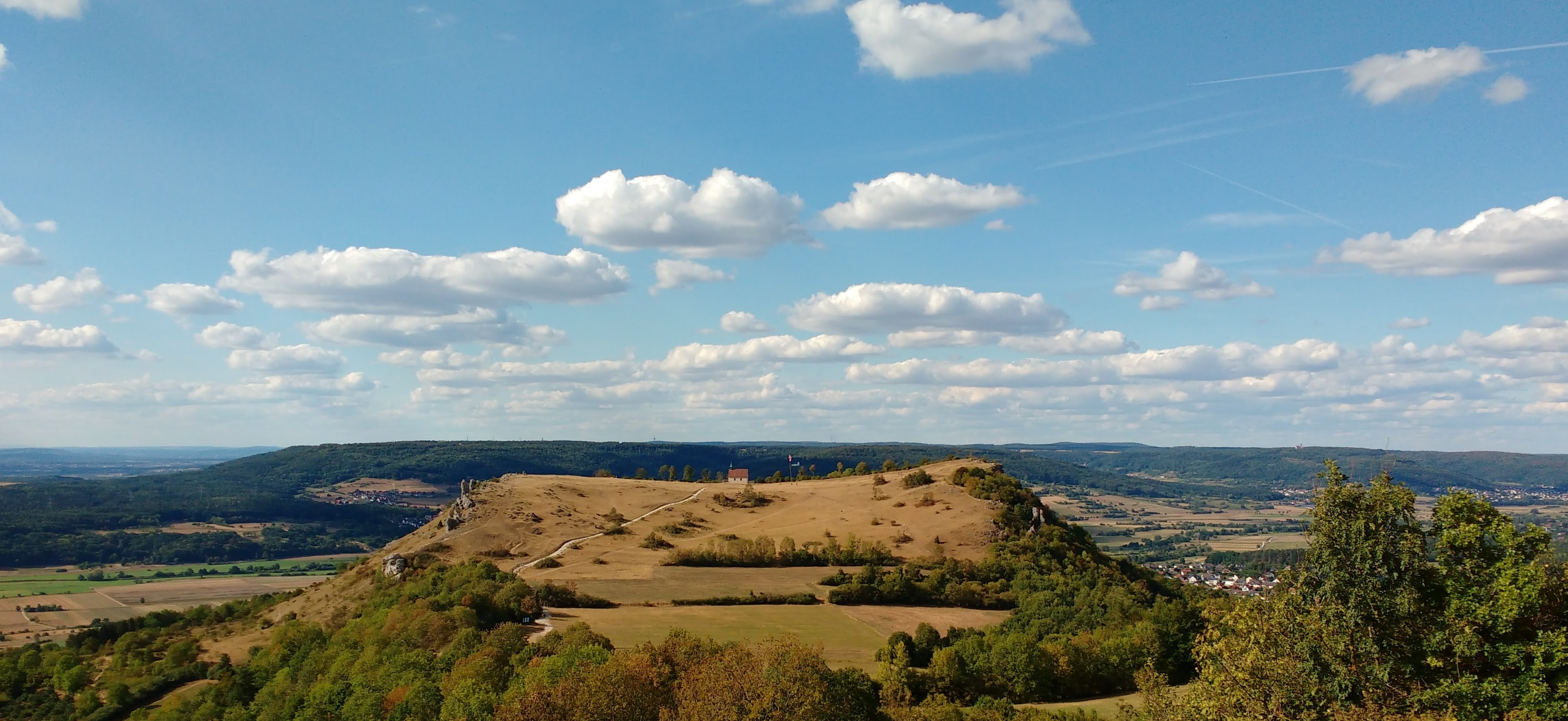
- View of the Walberla elevation (left) and the subpeak of Ehrenbürg (right) from its main peak Rodenstein.

Highest point
- Elevation: 531.7 m (1,744 ft)
- Prominence: 181 m (594 ft)
- Parent peak: Reckenberg (line parent)
- Isolation: 1.93 to hill (537 m above NHN) to the northeast
- Coordinates: 49°43′N 11°09′E

Geography
- Location within Bavaria
- Location: Bavaria, Germany

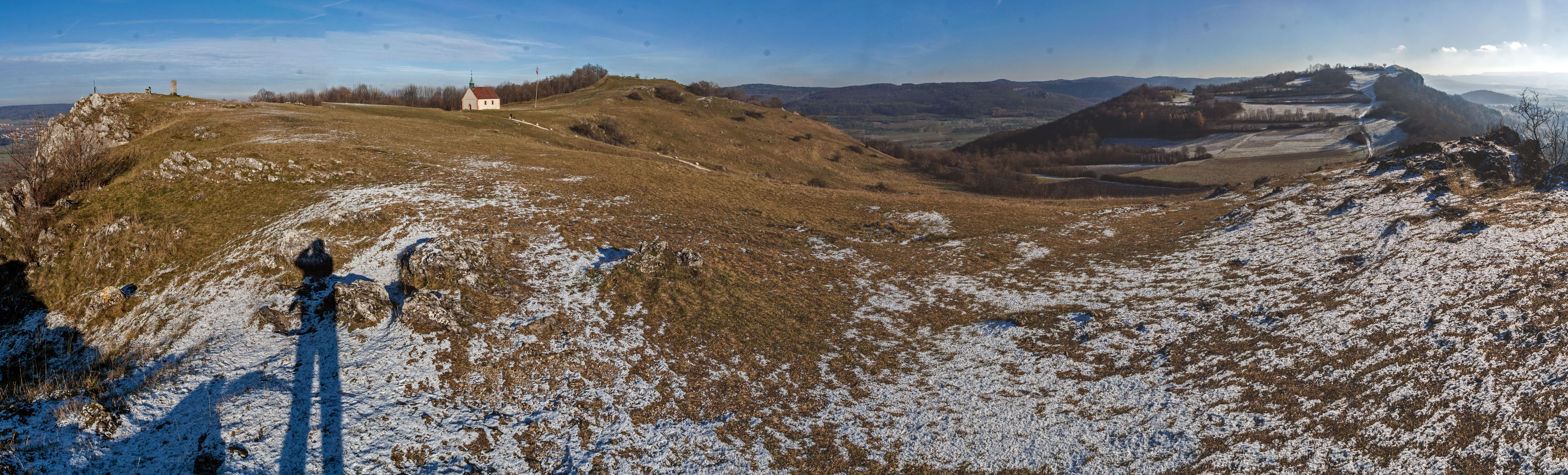
Ehrenbürg, Walberla and Rodenstein

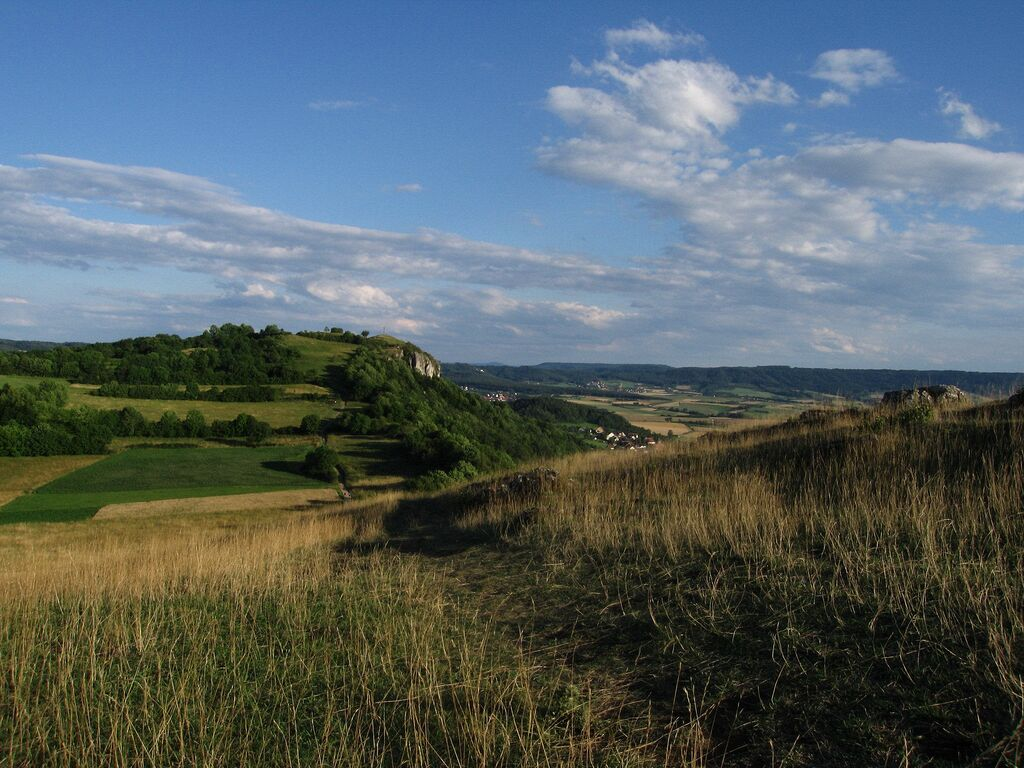
View of the Rodenstein from the Walberla

The Ehrenbürg (German pronunciation: [ˈeːʁənˌbʏʁk]) is a double-peaked butte on the edge of the Franconian Jura in Bavaria, Germany. It is located in the district of Forchheim in Upper Franconia, in the municipalities of Kirchehrenbach, Leutenbach and Wiesenthau. The northern peak is 522 m above NHN high. The well-known Walberla (513.9 m above NHN) is a subordinate elevation with a topographic prominence of 6 metres located to its west. The southern peak is the 531.7 m above NHN high Rodenstein (previously known as the Bodenstein). The outlier is popularly known as the Walberla.

== Geography ==
=== Location ===
The Ehrenbürg is located in the foothills of Franconian Switzerland, which is the northern part of the Franconian Jura, which in turn forms part of the South German Scarplands. It lies within the Franconian Switzerland and Veldenstein Forest Nature Park, approximately 2 km south-southeast of Kirchehrenbach, 1.4 km northwest of Leutenbach and 1.6 km east-northeast of Wiesenthau. Dietzhof, part of Leutenbach, and Schlaifhausen, part of Wiesenthau, lie south of the hill; Reuth, an eastern part of the town of Forchheim, lies west of it.

The hill is approximately 1.5 km long and 300 or 350 m wide at its widest. Its two peaks are 750 m apart, with a broad "saddle" between them. The Ehrenbach flows past the hill to the east; in Kirchehrenbach it joins the Wiesent-Mühlbach, a tributary of the Wiesent, which flows to the west.

=== Protected areas ===
The Ehrenbürg is located in the west of the twin natural protected areas of Ehrenbürg and Katzenköpfe, designated under the Habitats Directive of the European Union, and which are coterminous with the local extent of the bird protection area (Important Bird Area) Felsen- und Hangwälder in der Fränkischen Schweiz (cliffs and forested slopes of Little Switzerland). In addition, it is part of the western section of the Protected area Little Switzerland and Veldenstein Forest, which was founded in 2001 and comprises 1,021.64 km^{2}. The dry grassland habitat and rare plants, particularly orchids, caused the hill, in particular its higher parts, to be designated in 1987 as the Ehrenbürg Nature Protection Area, which is 1.55 km^{2} in area, extending a maximum of approximately 2.3 km from north to south and 1 km from east to west.

== Geology ==
=== Overview ===
The Ehrenbürg is an outlier that is separated by the Ehrenbach stream from the high plateau of the Franconian Jura. The roughly 1,500-metre-long and 300-metre-wide hill rises up to 250 metres above the plain of the Lower Wiesent Valley. It may be roughly divided into three areas: in the south is the Rodenstein with its summit (532 m) and the Schlaifhausener Kopf (512 m), in the centre is a broad saddle and in the north is the Walberla, including the Denkmalfels (514 m) and the Geierswandkopf (523 m).

At the start of the Jurassic, about 200 million years ago, a sea covered almost all of south Germany. During the Lower Jurassic (Lias) the region was initially still on the edge of the sea. Rivers transported sand from the mainlandinto the sea basin and the coast moved further southeast as a result. There in the still waters dark clays and marls were deposited.

The Ehrenbürgfelsen is designated a geotope by the Bavarian Department of the Environment.

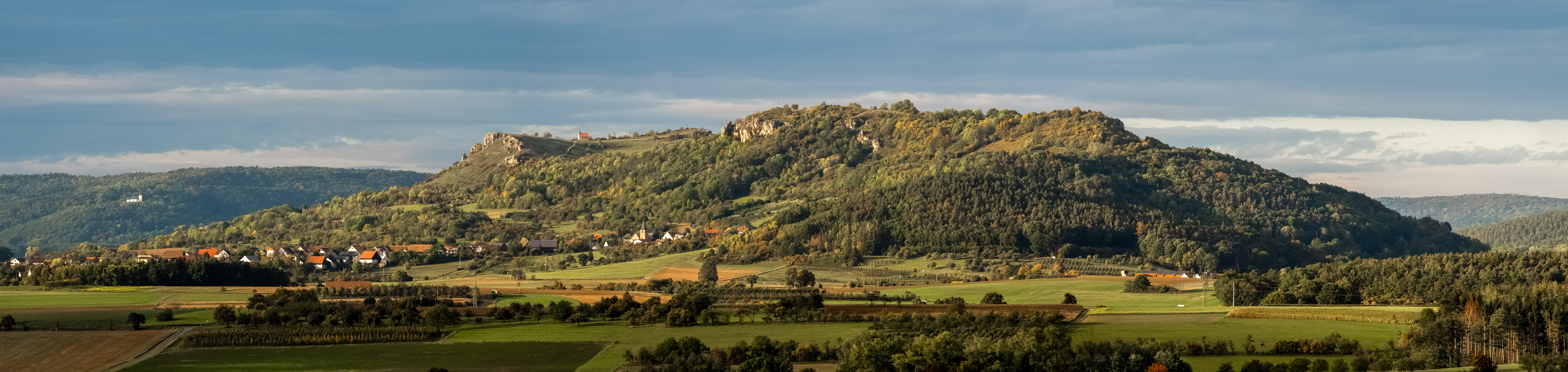
Ehrenbürg Panorama

=== Steinerne Frau on the Walberla ===
The Steinerne Frau ("Stone Woman") on the Walberla is a prominent rock formation on the western hillside of the Walberla. Weathering has resulted in erosion, especially of the vertical joints in the dolomite strata. Over time these crevices have become so extensively eroded that individual rock towers have been created. This rock tower has not been fully separated from the rock face in its lower section. The Steinerne Frau has been designated as a geotope, which was incorporated in September 2005 into the list of the most beautiful geotopes in Bavaria.

=== Wiesenthauer Nadel ===
About 100 metres south of the Steinerne Frau is the rock tower known as the Wiesenthauer Nadel ("Wiesenthau Needle"). This rock has been completed separated from its parent rock and is already tilting towards the valley.

=== Zwillingsfelsen ===
On the eastern edge of the Walberla are the Zwillingsfelsen ("Twin Rocks"). This rock pinnacle is also entirely independent of the neighbouring rock face and will probably collapse. It is designated as a geotope.

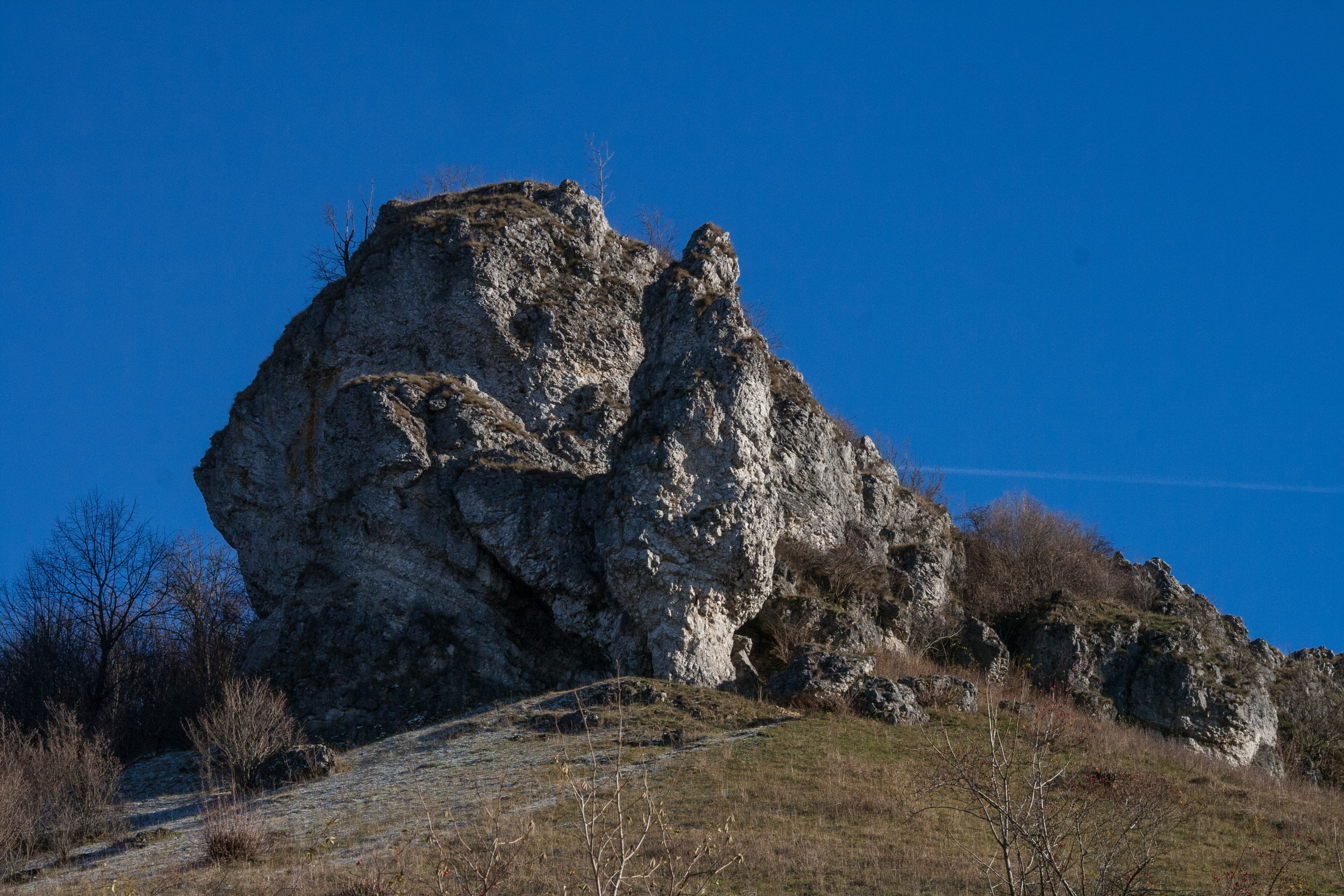
The Steinerne Frau

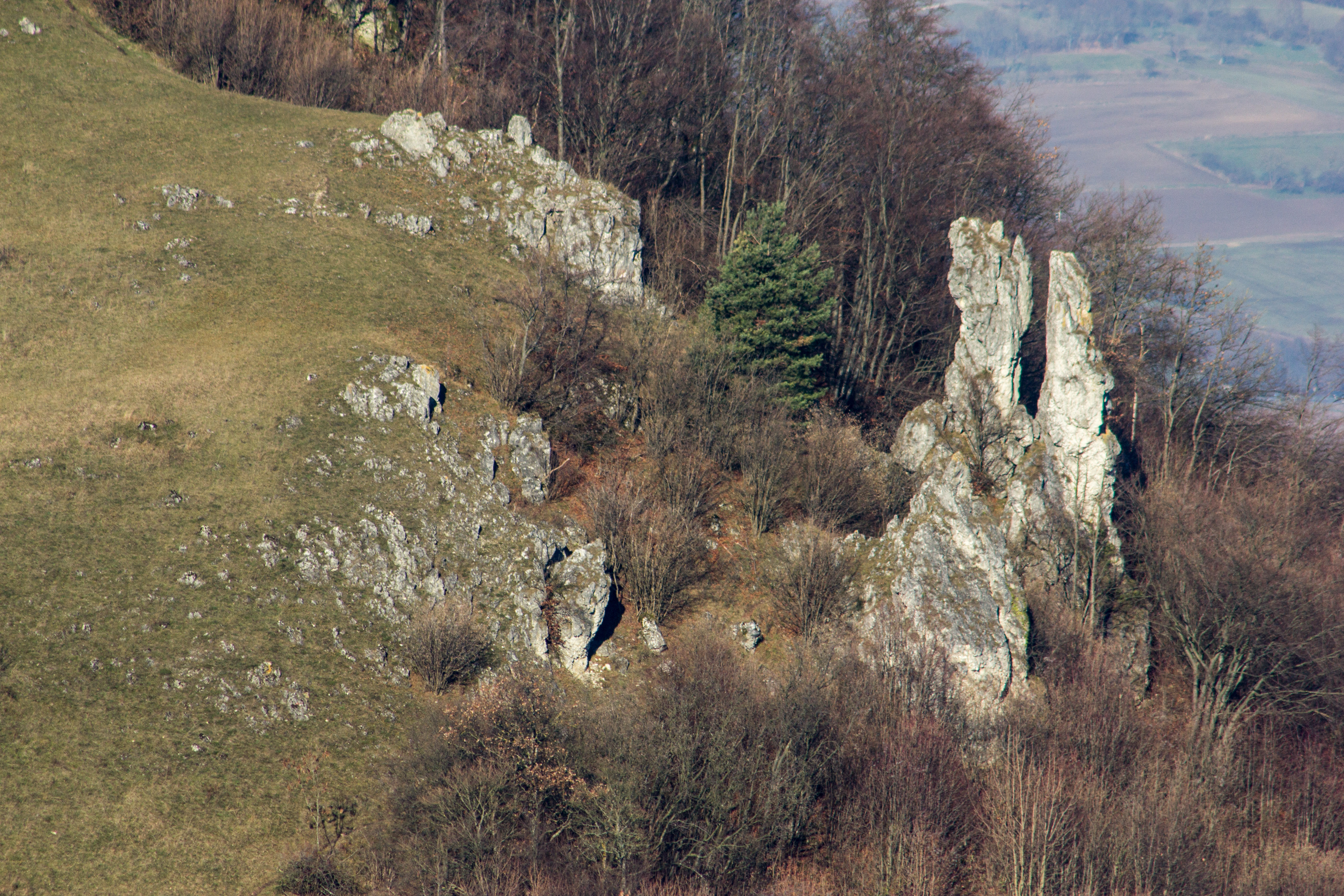
Zwillingsfelsen

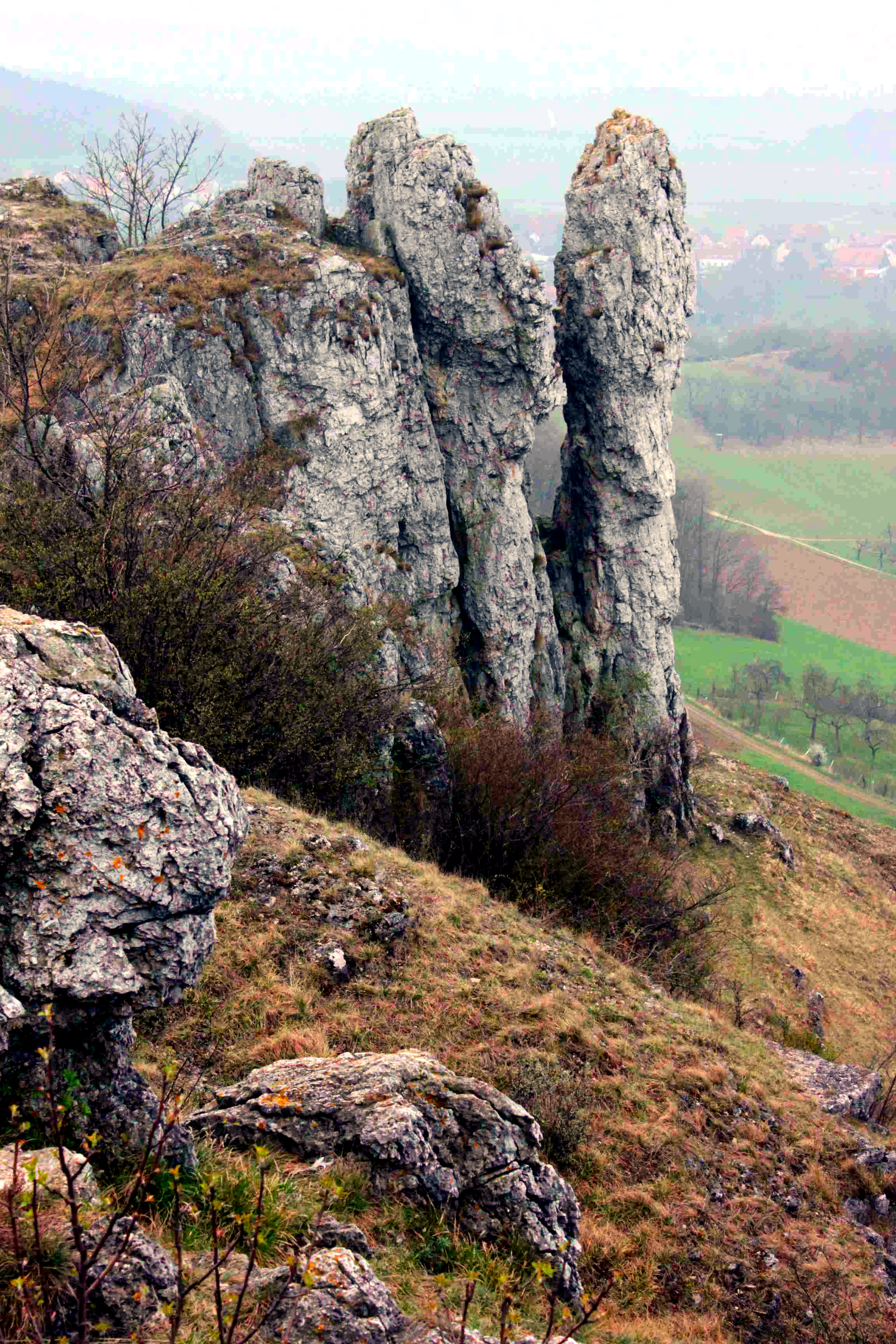
Wiesenthauer Nadel

== Names and history ==
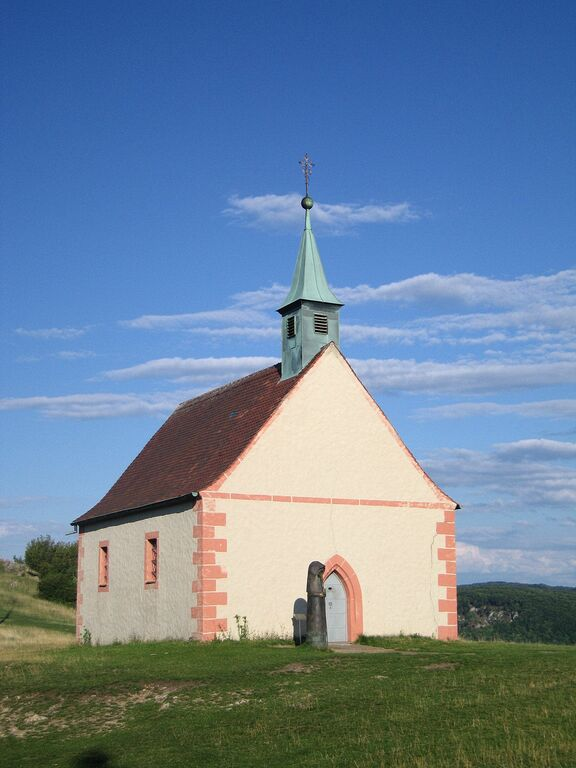
Chapel of St Walburga

The name Walberla is first recorded in an 18th-century document referring to students from Erlangen going up the mountain and is presumably derived from St Walburga. A 16th–17th-century chapel dedicated to her stands on the north peak; the first recorded mention of such a chapel is dated 1360.

The name Ehrenbürg appears to be earlier and has been variously interpreted. One interpretation derives it from Latin arca (protection) and German Burg (fortification), to mean "protective area" or "fort which is a safe retreat", another from Celtic *Ariacon or *Arika; and another from the Ehrenbach and the devices used to catch fish there. There are two local stories about fish. The chapel used to have a statue of the Virgin Mary with a water-filled crown in which a fish swam, and according to legend if the fish slapped its tail against the side of the crown, there would be a flood; also according to legend, an underground lake beneath the hill contains a fish so large that it must swallow its own tail, and if it released it, all the nearby settlements would be inundated by the resulting overflow.

The hill is also the subject of numerous legends about witches and hidden treasure, and the tale of a fabulous town which once stood at the foot of the hill, an accursed castle which stood where the chapel is now, and an evil woman who was turned to stone and became a rocky outcropping, the "steinerne Jungfrau" (stone virgin).

The hill was a settlement site from the early Neolithic (approximately 4000 BCE) until the end of the Roman period in the 5th century CE. In the late 14th century BCE, it became a hill fort; in the early Iron Age (approximately 550–380 BCE), under the Celtic Hallstatt and early La Tène cultures, it was a strongly fortified regional centre, with two gates and a citadel, and finds originating from Mediterranean cultures indicate far-flung trade. Remnants of these fortifications are still discernible. However, in the late Iron Age, during the late La Tène period (approximately 150–30 BCE) the hill was only lightly settled; instead, a large unfortified town grew up nearby at Altendorf. The defensive role of the Ehrenbürg appears to have been taken over by the Staffelberg. After an interruption, there was then possible occupation by Germanic people during the late Roman period, around 400 CE; unlike the Celtic settlement, only on the Rodenstein.

Archaeological finds indicate that during the Hallstatt and La Tène periods, the hill was the site of human sacrifices, possibly including cannibalism. Some human bones, such as a woman's skeleton which was unnaturally bent and buried under boulders, appear to be sacrifices for the luck of a building; some skulls have been cut up and had holes bored in them for use as amulets; the armless and legless skeleton of a baby, and discarded fragments of human bones with cut marks, both suggest cannibalism. Nine skeletons of newborn babies were also found to have been buried against the eastern foundation of the chapel in the 17th or the 18th century.

The first archaeological investigations of the Ehrenbürg were conducted beginning in 1903 by Hans Räbel (1872–1941), a teacher in Forchheim who founded the local historical society and was responsible for the foundation of the local museum. He succeeded in both saving Forchheim Castle and preventing development of the hill. Between 1989 and 1995, Björn-Uwe Abels of the Bayerisches Landesamt für Denkmalpflege (Bavarian State Department of Preservation) conducted extensive excavations. In 2005, a tranche was then taken through the wall to reveal the phases of development. Finds from the site, and from the Staffelberg, are now on display at the Archäologiemuseum Oberfranken (Archaeology Museum of Upper Franconia), a branch of the Bavarian State Archaeological Collection housed in Forchheim Castle.

An early 16th-century wooden statue of St. Walburga by Hans Nußbaum used to stand in the chapel, flanked by statues of her brothers, but was stolen; on 1 May 2000, a new bronze statue in front of it, by Ernst Steinacker, was dedicated.

== Modern uses ==
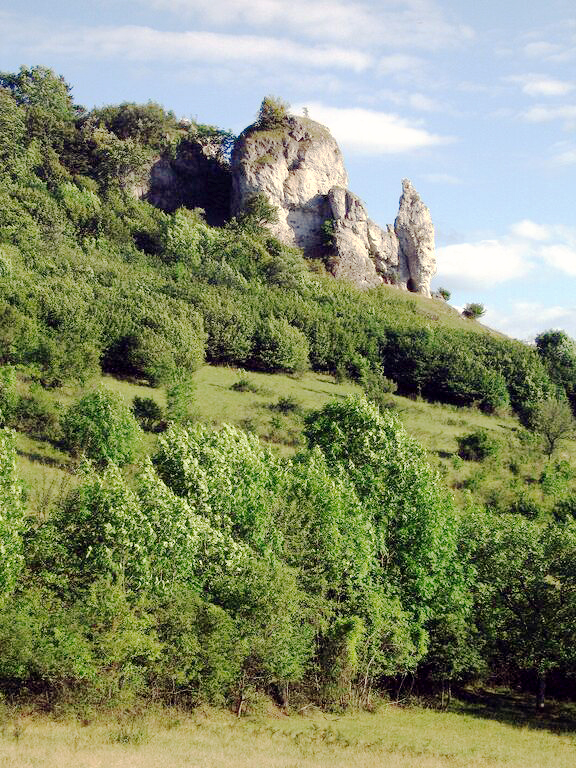
Rockface on the hill

=== Walberla-Fest ===
The Walberla-Fest in honour of St. Walburga is the oldest spring festival in Germany; pilgrimages associated with the Walberla-Kärwa are attested as early as the 9th century. It supposedly derives from an ancient heathen festival. It grew from a pilgrimage into a widely attended fair. In 1801, geographer J. B. Koppelt described it as "a famous market ... attended by merchants from Saxony, Bayreuth, the Palatinate and Nuremberg and where every imaginable class of merchandise is offered, especially shoes." It became particularly popular with students from the University of Erlangen; a student's account of attending the fair in 1798 is preserved. The poet Joseph Victor von Scheffel writes in his 1863 poem Exodus Cantorum – Bambergischer Domchorknaben Sängerfahrt:

Ob Vorchheim bei Kirchehrenbach

Woll'n wir zu Berge steigen.
Dort schwingt sich am Walburgistag
Der Franken Maimarktreigen.
Der ist seit grauer Heidenzeit
Noch allem Landvolk theuer,
Schatzkind, halt Gürtel fest und Kleid,

Wir springen durch die Feuer!

Above Forchheim at Kirchehrenbach

Let's go up on the hilltop
There on St. Walburga's Day
The Franconian May-market dance is in full swing
Since dim days of heathendom
It has been dear to all people of the land
Darling, hold your belt and your dress tight

We're jumping through the fire!

Until 1910, the fair took place on the saint's day, 1 May; since then it has been held on the first Sunday in May.

=== Climbing ===
Climbing the Walberla has been forbidden since 1991. On the Rodenstein, only established routes may be climbed. There are 44 of these, up to UIAA grade VIII+. Major climbing routes are the Schlaifhausen Face, the Frankenschnellweg (Franconian Shortcut) and the Edelweiß Face.

== Sources ==
- G. Böhner. "Das Walberla - eine Attraktion seit 100 000 Jahren". Die Fränkische Schweiz 4 (1983) 109–11 (in German)
- Björn-Uwe Abels. "Kannibalismus auf der Ehrenbürg". Das archäologische Jahr in Bayern 1990. pp. 68–70 (in German)
- Georg Schwarz. Die Ehrenburg (Walberla). Heimatbeilage zum Amtlichen Schulanzeiger des Regierungsbezirks Oberfranken 207. Bayreuth: Regierung von Oberfranken, 1994 (in German)
- Björn-Uwe Abels. "Überblick über die Besiedelung der Ehrenbürg in vorgeschichtlicher Zeit". Bericht der Bayerischen Bodendenkmalpflege 30/31 (1994) 103–22 (in German)
- Hermann Schmidt-Kaler. Das Walberla - Ein Weißjura-Zeugenberg vor der Frankenalb. Wanderungen in die Erdgeschichte 15. Munich: Pfeil, 2004. ISBN 978-3-89993-749-7 (in German)
- Björn-Uwe Abels, Günter Dippold, Wolfgang Schirmer and Ermelinda Spoletschnik, eds. Die Ehrenbürg. Geologie - Archäologie - Volkskunde. Proceedings of the symposium Die Ehrenbürg - neue Forschungsergebnisse, 7 October 2006. Forchheim: Kulturamt des Landkreises Forchheim, 2009. ISBN 978-3-9811274-5-4 (in German)
