= Kalkach =

River in Germany

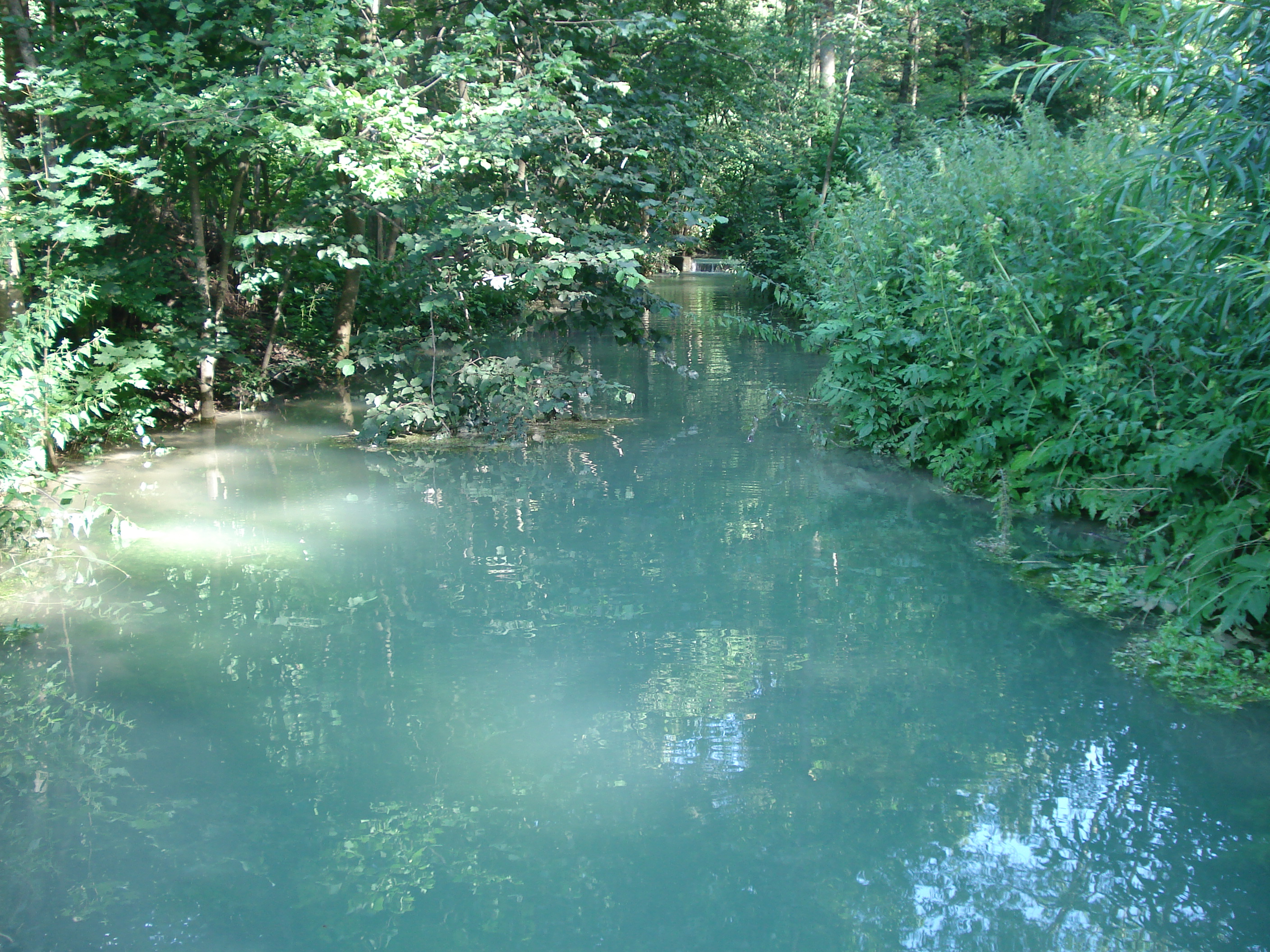
- The Kalkach shortly after its origin

Location
- Country: Germany
- States: Bavaria

Physical characteristics
- Mouth
  - location: Aubach
  - coordinates: 49.6272°N 11.2501°E

Basin features
- Progression: Aubach→ Schwabach→ Regnitz→ Main→ Rhine→ North Sea

The Kalkach is a river in Bavaria, Germany. It flows into the Aubach in Weißenohe.

== See also ==
- List of rivers of Bavaria
