= Dietzhof Castle =

- Leutenbach-Dietzhof

Site information
- Type: lowland castle and settlement
- Code: DE-BY
- Condition: burgstall, remains built into new building

Location
- Coordinates: 49°42′05″N 11°09′48″E
- Height: Height missing, see template documentation

Site history
- Built: recorded in 1433

Dietzhof Castle (German: Burg Dietzhof) was a high medieval water castle on the site of House No. 42 in the village of Dietzhof, in the municipality of Leutenbach in the county of Forchheim in the south German state of Bavaria.

The castle appears in the records in 1433, its owners being named as the lords of Stiebar. All that is left today are two barrel vaulted rooms in the barn of the house. In the south wall there are arrow slits and to the west of them are the remains of a circular moat.

== Literature ==
- Hellmut Kunstmann: Die Burgen der südwestlichen Fränkischen Schweiz. Darstellungen aus der Fränkischen Geschichte 28, Veröffentlichungen der Gesellschaft für Fränkische Geschichte Reihe IX, Insingen, 1990.
