= Trainmeusel =

- Village of Wiesenttal
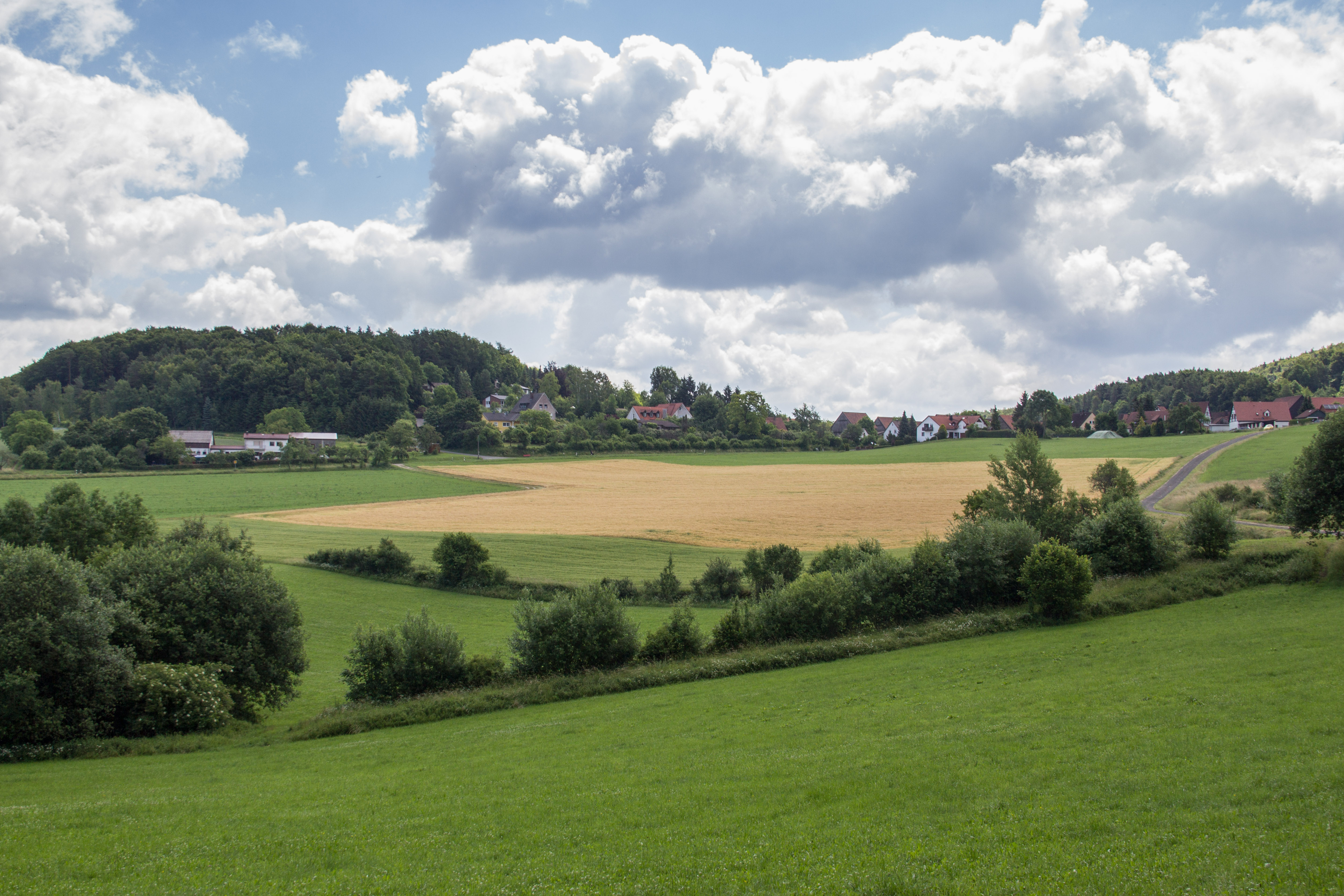
- View of the village
- Interactive map of Trainmeusel
- Location within Germany Location within Bavaria
- Coordinates: 49°47′43″N 11°14′50″E
- Country: Germany
- State: Bavaria
- Municipality: Wiesenttal
- Elevation: 445 m (1,460 ft)

Population (1987)
  - Total: 90
- Time zone: UTC+01:00 (CET)
  - Summer (DST): UTC+02:00 (CEST)
- Postal codes: 91346
- Dialling codes: 09196

Trainmeusel is a village in the Upper Franconian market municipality of Wiesenttal in the district of Forchheim in the German state of Bavaria.

== Location ==
The village lies within the Franconian Switzerland-Veldenstein Forest Nature Park, about 1.3 kilometres southwest of Muggendorf on a Jurassic plateau of the Franconian Jura. The village may be reached by car from Muggendorf on the Kreisstrasse FO35. Its neighbouring villages in clockwise order are Muggendorf, Wohlmannsgesees, and Birkenreuth.

== History ==
Trainmeusel was probably founded in the 9th century. The village was first mentioned in 1137. Its name is derived from the Slavic Dragomysl and means "Dragomysl's place".

== Today ==
The village is rural in character, has no shops and one inn.

Near Trainmeusel is the Trainmeusel Spring, a spring formed between two layers of rock (Schichtquelle) which is protected as a natural monument.
