= Unterleinleiter Castle =

- Unterleinleiter

Site information
- Type: lowland castle, motte and bailey?
- Code: DE-BY
- Condition: lost or levelled

Location
- Height: Height missing, see template documentation

Site history
- Built: mentioned 1380

Unterleinleiter Castle (German: Burg Unterleinleiter) is a now-levelled, medieval lowland castle near the village of Unterleinleiter in the county of Forchheim in the south German state of Bavaria.

Walter VI of Streitberg is mentioned as the occupant castle referred to in 1380 as Leinlewter Fortress and which was destroyed in 1409 due to a breach of the Landfrieden.

Of the former fortification, which could have been a motte and bailey castle, nothing has survived. In 1536 the site was still described as Wale, i.e. a motte.

== Literature ==
- Gustav Voit, Walter Rüfer: Eine Burgenreise durch die Fränkische Schweiz – Auf den Spuren des Zeichners A. F. Thomas Ostertag. 2nd edn., Verlag Palm & Enke, Erlangen, 1991, ISBN 3-7896-0064-4, p. 204.
