= Dörnhof Castle =

Castle in Germany

- Gräfenberg-Dörnhof
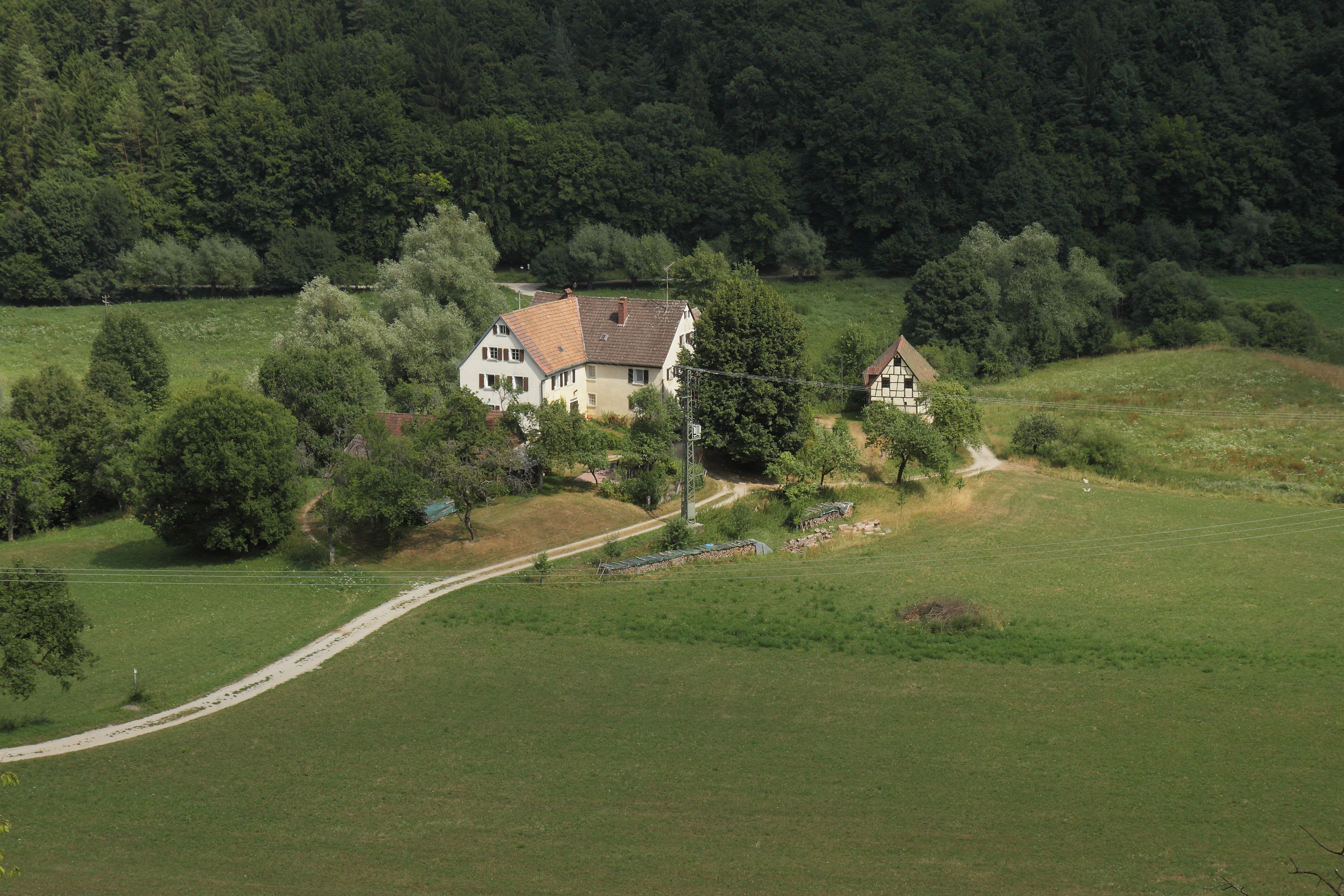
- Dörnhof farm on the site of the old castle

Site information
- Type: lowland castle
- Code: DE-BY
- Condition: burgstall (no above-ground ruins)

Location
- Location within Germany
- Coordinates: 49°40′54″N 11°16′41″E
- Height: 400 m above sea level (NHN)

Site history
- Built: recorded in 1502–1503

The burgstall of Dörnhof Castle is the site of a demolished, medieval lowland castle situated at a height of 400 m above sea level (NHN) in the vicinity of Dörnhof Farm near the village of Dörnhof, part of Gräfenberg in the county of Forchheim in the German state of Bavaria.

In 1502 the castle is mentioned as Dürnhoff in an uncompleted deed of purchase between Nuremberg citizens, Hans Helchner and Sebald Tucher. On 13 December 1505 Durnhof was sold by Hans Helchner jun. as a freehold possession with its estate to the city of Nuremberg. The seat was last mentioned in 1547. It was probably destroyed in 1553 during the Second Margrave War.

Of the former castle, which was laid out on a triangular site, the only surviving remains are high retaining walls on the downhill side of the smallholding and traces of a neck ditch on the uphill side.

== Literature ==
- Robert Giersch, Andreas Schlunk, Berthold von Haller: Burgen und Herrensitze in der Nürnberger Landschaft – Ein historisches Handbuch nach Vorarbeiten von Dr. Gustav Voit. Selbstverlag der Altnürnberger Landschaft e. V., Lauf an der Pegnitz, 2006, ISBN 978-3-00-020677-1, p. 72.
- Walter Heinz: Ehemalige Adelssitze im Trubachtal – Ein Wegweiser für Heimatfreunde und Wanderer. Verlag Palm und Enke, Erlangen und Jena, 1996, ISBN 3-7896-0554-9, pp. 93–98.
- Hellmut Kunstmann: Die Burgen der südwestlichen Fränkischen Schweiz. Aus der Reihe: Veröffentlichungen der Gesellschaft für Fränkische Geschichte Reihe IX: Darstellungen aus der Fränkischen Geschichte, Vol. 28. Kommissionsverlag Degener und Co., Neustadt/Aisch, 1990, p. 217.
