= Leutenbach =

Leutenbach may refer to two municipalities in Germany:

- Leutenbach, Baden-Württemberg
- Leutenbach, Bavaria
