= Muggendorf (disambiguation) =

Muggendorf is a municipality in Wiener Neustadt-Land, Austria.

Muggendorf may also refer to:

- Muggendorf, part of Stainz bei Straden, Styria, Austria
- Muggendorf (Wiesenttal), part of Wiesenttal, Germany
