= Masters M75 hammer throw world record progression =

Masters M75 hammer throw world record progression is the progression of world record improvements of the hammer throw M75 division of Masters athletics. Records must be set in properly conducted, official competitions under the standing IAAF rules unless modified by World Masters Athletics. The M75 division consists of male athletes who have reached the age of 75 but have not yet reached the age of 80, so exactly from their 75th birthday to the day before their 80th birthday. The M75 division throws a 4 kg implement.

Key

Incomplete information Pending

Distance	Athlete	Nationality	Birthdate.	Age	Location	Date	Ref
52.22	Arild Busterud	Norway	26 January 1948	75 years, 93 days	Tønsberg	29 April 2023	
51.88	Jerzy Jablonsky	Poland	23 April 1945	77 years, 339 days	Toruń	28 March 2023	
51.52	Jerzy Jablonsky	Poland	23 April 1945	75 years, 96 days	Toruń	28 July 2020	
51.51	Bob Ward	United States	1 July 1933	75 years, 32 days	Eugene	2 August 2008	
49.08	Bob Ward	United States	1 July 1933	75 years, 25 days	Coppell	26 July 2008	
47.67	Richard Rzehak	Germany	13 October 1929	75 years, 204 days	Effeltrich	5 May 2005	
45.92	Aarne Miettinen	Finland	27 March 1913	75 years, 48 days	Hyvinkaa	14 May 1988	
44.70	Olav Reppen	Norway	9 July 1911	75 years, 318 days	Bronnoysund	23 May 1987	
42.56	Karsten Brodersen	Germany	24 June 1907	76 years, 20 days		14 July 1983	
