= Schloss Unterleinleiter =

Coordinates: 49.8239°N 11.1888°E

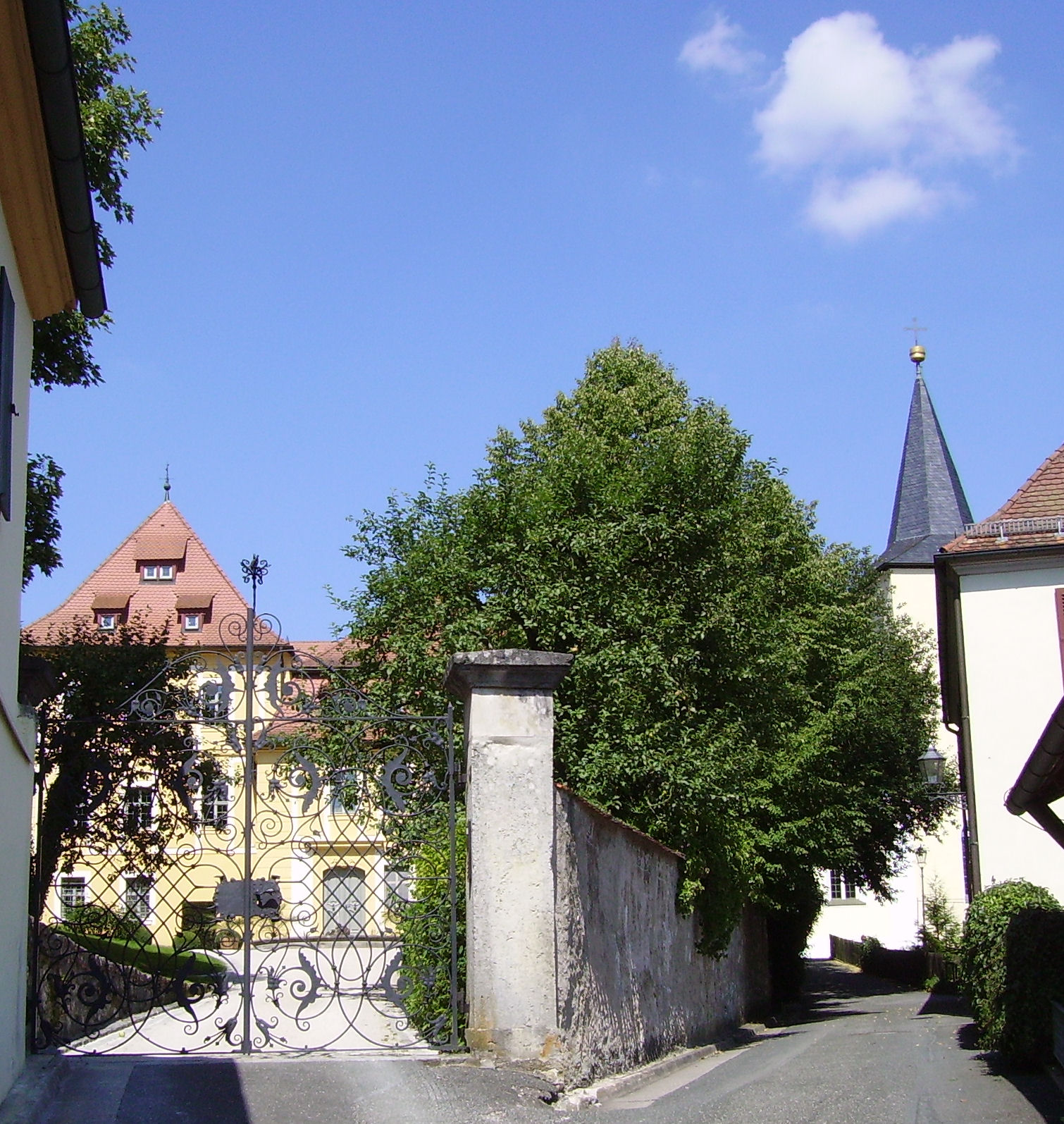
Schloss Unterleinleiter (left)

Schloss Unterleinleiter is a German schloss in Unterleinleiter in Upper Franconia. The building has 29 rooms and is privately owned.

== History ==
The schloss is mentioned in the records in 1372. After it had been rebuilt following its destruction in the Peasants' War in 1523, it lasted until 1690 when it was razed again by a conflagration and once more rebuilt. In 1757 it went to the Freiherren of Seckendorff and was given its present appearance around 1770. The family gave the residence up in 1952. In the period that followed up to the 1980s the whole area was run by the remedial children's home of Schloss Borgehnstein, whose successor community still exists at a new location on the hill of Störnhofer Berg in Unterleinleiter. From 1986 the schloss and its park were restored.

== Schlosspark ==
Schloss Unterleinleiter has a castle park, 17 hectares in area, which was laid out as a Baroque garden after the Thirty Years' War. After the schloss and park were transferred into private ownership in 1985, the park was partially reconstructed with the aid of old plans. In the park are numerous, mainly modern, works of art (including sculptures by Harro Frey) and a sandstone building that used to be used as a tea house. During the summer months the park is used for cultural events.

There is a deep well and pump house in the Schlosspark which supplies drinking water to the village.

== Literature ==
- Kai Kellermann: Herrschaftliche Gärten in der Fränkischen Schweiz - Eine Spurensuche. Verlag Palm & Enke, Erlangen and Jena, 2008, ISBN 978-3-7896-0683-0, pp. 242–259.
- Hellmut Kunstmann: Die Burgen der nordwestlichen und nördlichen Fränkischen Schweiz. Reprint of the 1972 edition. Kommissionsverlag Degener & Co, Neustadt an der Aisch, 2000, ISBN 3-7686-9265-5, pp. 33–43.
- Toni Eckert, Susanne Fischer, Renate Freitag, Rainer Hofmann, Walter Tausendpfund: Die Burgen der Fränkischen Schweiz – Ein Kulturführer. Gürtler Druck, Forchheim, 1997, ISBN 3-9803276-5-5, pp. 171–174.
