= Gosberg =

- Verwaltungsgemeinschaft
- Location of Gosberg within Forchheim district
- Interactive map of Gosberg
- Location within Germany Location within Bavaria
- Coordinates: 49°42′N 11°06′E
- Country: Germany
- State: Bavaria
- Admin. region: Upper Franconia
- District: Forchheim
- Seat: Pinzberg
- Subdivisions: 3 municipalities

Area
  - Total: 29.56 km^{2} (11.41 sq mi)

Population (2025-12-31)
  - Total: 4,939
  - Density: 167.1/km^{2} (432.7/sq mi)
- Time zone: UTC+01:00 (CET)
  - Summer (DST): UTC+02:00 (CEST)
- Website: www.vg-gosberg.de

Gosberg is a Verwaltungsgemeinschaft (municipal association) in the district of Forchheim in Bavaria, Germany. Its seat is in Pinzberg. It takes its name from the village Gosberg, part of the municipality Pinzberg.

It consists of the following municipalities:

1. Kunreuth
2. Pinzberg
3. Wiesenthau
