= Hetzles =

- Municipality
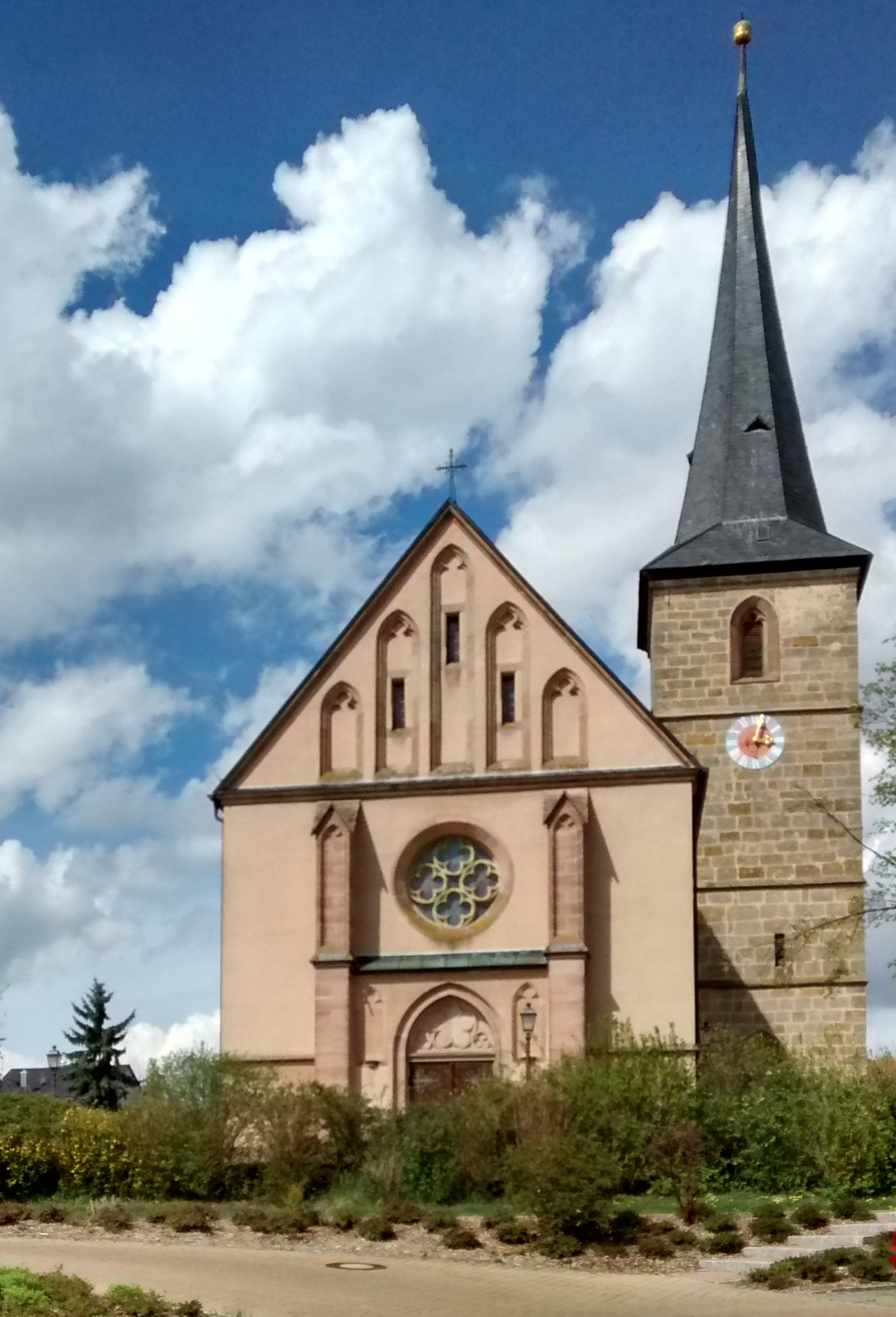
- Church of Saint Lawrence

- Coat of arms

- Location of Hetzles within Forchheim district
- Interactive map of Hetzles
- Location within Germany Location within Bavaria
- Coordinates: 49°38′N 11°8′E
- Country: Germany
- State: Bavaria
- Admin. region: Oberfranken
- District: Forchheim
- Municipal assoc.: Dormitz

Government
  - Mayor (2020–26): Michael Bayer

Area
  - Total: 11.74 km^{2} (4.53 sq mi)
- Elevation: 340 m (1,120 ft)

Population (2025-12-31)
  - Total: 1,376
  - Density: 117.2/km^{2} (303.6/sq mi)
- Time zone: UTC+01:00 (CET)
  - Summer (DST): UTC+02:00 (CEST)
- Postal codes: 91077
- Dialling codes: 09134
- Vehicle registration: FO
- Website: www.hetzles.de

Hetzles is a municipality in the district of Forchheim in Bavaria in Germany. The Municipality Hetzles includes the villages of Hetzles and Honings.
