= Gräfenberg (Verwaltungsgemeinschaft) =

- Verwaltungsgemeinschaft
- Location of Gräfenberg within Forchheim district
- Interactive map of Gräfenberg
- Location within Germany Location within Bavaria
- Coordinates: 49°39′N 11°15′E
- Country: Germany
- State: Bavaria
- Admin. region: Upper Franconia
- District: Forchheim
- Seat: Gräfenberg
- Subdivisions: 3 municipalities

Area
  - Total: 68.06 km^{2} (26.28 sq mi)

Population (2025-12-31)
  - Total: 6,828
  - Density: 100.3/km^{2} (259.8/sq mi)
- Time zone: UTC+01:00 (CET)
  - Summer (DST): UTC+02:00 (CEST)
- Website: www.verwaltungsgemeinschaft-graefenberg.de

Gräfenberg is a Verwaltungsgemeinschaft (municipal association) in the district of Forchheim in Bavaria, Germany. Its seat is in Gräfenberg.

It consists of the following municipalities:

1. Gräfenberg
2. Hiltpoltstein
3. Weißenohe
