= Ebermannstadt (Verwaltungsgemeinschaft) =

- Verwaltungsgemeinschaft
- Location of Ebermannstadt within Forchheim district
- Interactive map of Ebermannstadt
- Location within Germany Location within Bavaria
- Coordinates: 49°47′N 11°11′E
- Country: Germany
- State: Bavaria
- Admin. region: Upper Franconia
- District: Forchheim
- Seat: Ebermannstadt
- Subdivisions: 2 municipalities

Area
  - Total: 62.42 km^{2} (24.10 sq mi)

Population (2025-12-31)
  - Total: 7,931
  - Density: 127.1/km^{2} (329.1/sq mi)
- Time zone: UTC+01:00 (CET)
  - Summer (DST): UTC+02:00 (CEST)
- Website: www.ebermannstadt.de

Ebermannstadt is a Verwaltungsgemeinschaft (municipal association) in the district of Forchheim in Bavaria, Germany. Its seat is in Ebermannstadt.

It consists of the following municipalities:

1. Ebermannstadt
2. Unterleinleiter
