= Kirchehrenbach (Verwaltungsgemeinschaft) =

- Verwaltungsgemeinschaft
- Location of Kirchehrenbach within Forchheim district
- Interactive map of Kirchehrenbach
- Location within Germany Location within Bavaria
- Coordinates: 49°44′N 11°09′E
- Country: Germany
- State: Bavaria
- Admin. region: Upper Franconia
- District: Forchheim
- Seat: Kirchehrenbach
- Subdivisions: 3 municipalities

Area
  - Total: 36.23 km^{2} (13.99 sq mi)

Population (2025-12-31)
  - Total: 5,814
  - Density: 160.5/km^{2} (415.6/sq mi)
- Time zone: UTC+01:00 (CET)
  - Summer (DST): UTC+02:00 (CEST)
- Website: vg-kirchehrenbach.de

Kirchehrenbach is a Verwaltungsgemeinschaft (municipal association) in the district of Forchheim in Bavaria, Germany. Its seat is in Kirchehrenbach.

It consists of the following municipalities:

1. Kirchehrenbach
2. Leutenbach
3. Weilersbach
