= Kleinsendelbach =

- Municipality
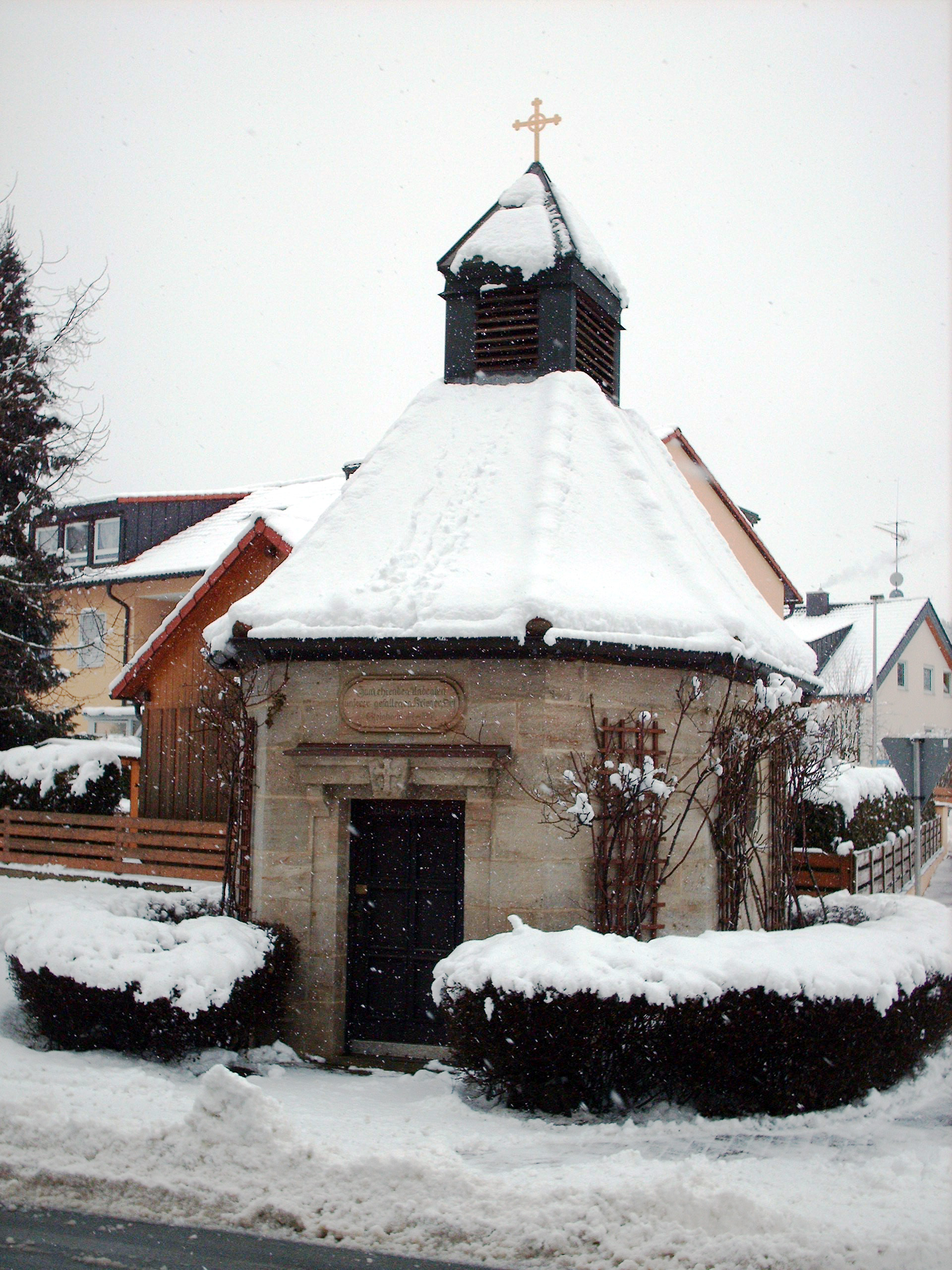
- Steinbach Chapel

- Coat of arms

- Location of Kleinsendelbach within Forchheim district
- Interactive map of Kleinsendelbach
- Location within Germany Location within Bavaria
- Coordinates: 49°37′N 11°10′E
- Country: Germany
- State: Bavaria
- Admin. region: Oberfranken
- District: Forchheim
- Municipal assoc.: Dormitz
- Subdivisions: 2 Ortsteile

Government
  - Mayor (2020–26): Gertrud Werner

Area
  - Total: 7.50 km^{2} (2.90 sq mi)
- Elevation: 312 m (1,024 ft)

Population (2025-12-31)
  - Total: 1,448
  - Density: 193/km^{2} (500/sq mi)
- Time zone: UTC+01:00 (CET)
  - Summer (DST): UTC+02:00 (CEST)
- Postal codes: 91077
- Dialling codes: 09126
- Vehicle registration: FO
- Website: www.kleinsendelbach.de

Kleinsendelbach is a municipality in the district of Forchheim in Bavaria in Germany. It is located about 17 Kilometers south of the town of Forchheim and 15 Kilometers to the east of the city of Erlangen, and is part of the administration community Dormitz.

== History ==
Kleinsendelbach was first mentioned in 1062. It was part of the Prince-Bishopric of Bamberg and therefore from 1500 onward part of the Franconian Circle during the Holy Roman Empire. After 1803 the village was ceded to Bavaria where it was declared a municipality in 1818. Despite its comparably small size as a municipality, Kleinsendelbach's independence was untouched by the territorial reforms of 1972 and 1978 though it has joined the administrative community Dormitz along with two neighboring municipalities.

== Politics ==
The presiding mayor is Gertrud Werner since 2008 along with the second mayor Josef Elsinger. The regional council consists of 12 members and the mayor, none of which are part of a major party.

=== Coat of arms ===
Kleinsendelbach's coat of arms consists of a silver wolf's head on a blue background, a black lion head on a yellow background, and white and red stripes in the middle.

== Sights ==
In 1982, Kleinsendelbach was awarded with the title of the most beautiful village in the Forchheim district. There is one church (St. Heinrich, built 1952) and three chapels. Around the municipality are many lakes which are typical for the region and bank on nature protection zones.

== Organizations ==
Kleinsendelbach is home to multiple organizations for elderly care, traditional singing and dancing, culture preservation, fishing, and a local group of the scout association Pfadfinderbund Weltenbummler.
