= Pinzberg =

- Municipality
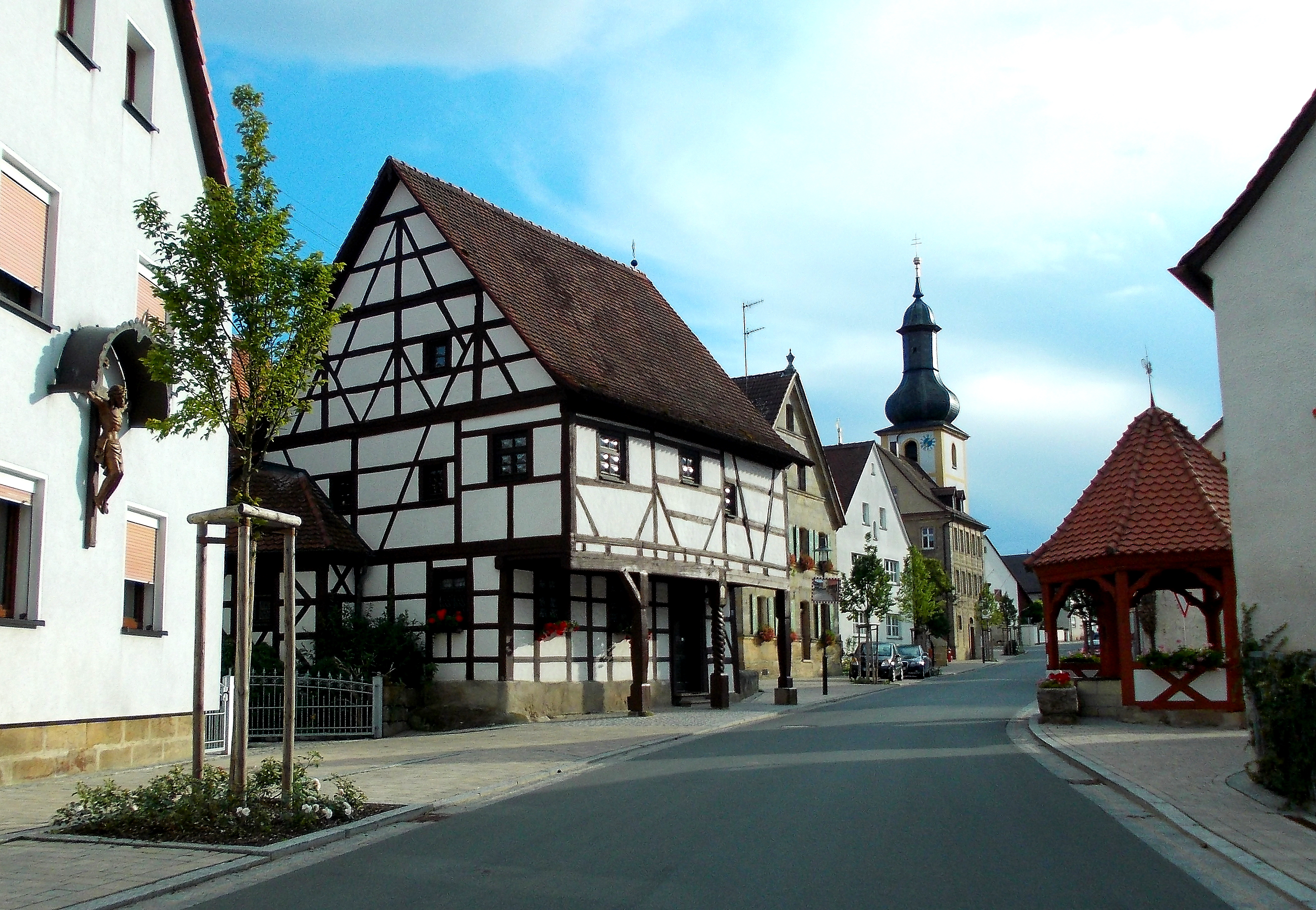
- Center of the village

- Coat of arms

- Location of Pinzberg within Forchheim district
- Interactive map of Pinzberg
- Location within Germany Location within Bavaria
- Coordinates: 49°42′N 11°6′E
- Country: Germany
- State: Bavaria
- Admin. region: Oberfranken
- District: Forchheim
- Municipal assoc.: Gosberg

Government
  - Mayor (2020–26): Elisabeth Simmerlein

Area
  - Total: 13.31 km^{2} (5.14 sq mi)
- Elevation: 336 m (1,102 ft)

Population (2025-12-31)
  - Total: 1,958
  - Density: 147.1/km^{2} (381.0/sq mi)
- Time zone: UTC+01:00 (CET)
  - Summer (DST): UTC+02:00 (CEST)
- Postal codes: 91361
- Dialling codes: 09191
- Vehicle registration: FO
- Website: https://www.pinzberg.de/

Pinzberg (German pronunciation: [ˈpɪntsbɛʁk]) is a municipality in the district of Forchheim in Bavaria in Germany.

Pinzberg lies in the region Upper Franconia west.

The following districts exist: Dobenreuth, Gosberg, Pinzberg, Elsenberg.

== History ==
Pinzberg belonged to the Prince-Bishopric of Bamberg. Since the realm deputation main conclusion of 1803, Pinzberg belongs to Bavaria. In the course of the administrative reforms in Bavaria, today's municipality developed with the municipality edict of 1818.

== Population ==
Population in the municipality in 1970 was 1,608, in 1987 was 1,696, and in the year 2000, 1,864 inhabitants were counted.

== Politics ==
Since 1996, there is a youth local council in Pinzberg. This was brought into being by the mayor at that time, Reinhardt Glauber. The current youth mayor (in German "Jugendbuergermeister") is Fabian Fridl.

The local council of Pinzberg has 13 members including the mayor.

== Coat of arms ==
The coat of arms reads: In gold an in-curved red point, therein a silver gate tower also on both sides following silver right parallelepiped wall; beseitet in front of a black three-blade clover sheet, in the back of a black grain flower bloom. Pinzberg consists of the villages Dobenreuth, Elsenberg, Gosberg and Pinzberg. All places are to be represented in the coat of arms. The tower is the landmark of Pinzberg and refers to the church tower, that at the same time serves as a gate tower of the cemetery attachment from the second half of the 15th century. The in-curved red point is the symbol of the Holy Trinity and stands for Gosberg and its branch church, which the Holy Trinity is dedicated. The clover sheet stands for Dobenreuth and symbolizes the rare Patrozinium of the holy family. Since the Middle Ages both the terrestrial and the Holy Trinity are often represented by nature forms such as clover sheets. The agriculture of Elsenberg is represented by the cornflower sheet on the coat of arms. The colors gold and black from the Pinzberg coat of arms remind of the long-lasting relationship with the diocese Bamberg. In the year 1062 Heinrich IV gave parts of today's territory of Pinzberg the diocese.

The emblem is used since 1988 on the legal base of a Resolution of the local council and the agreement of the government of Upper Franconia.
