= Dormitz =

- Municipality
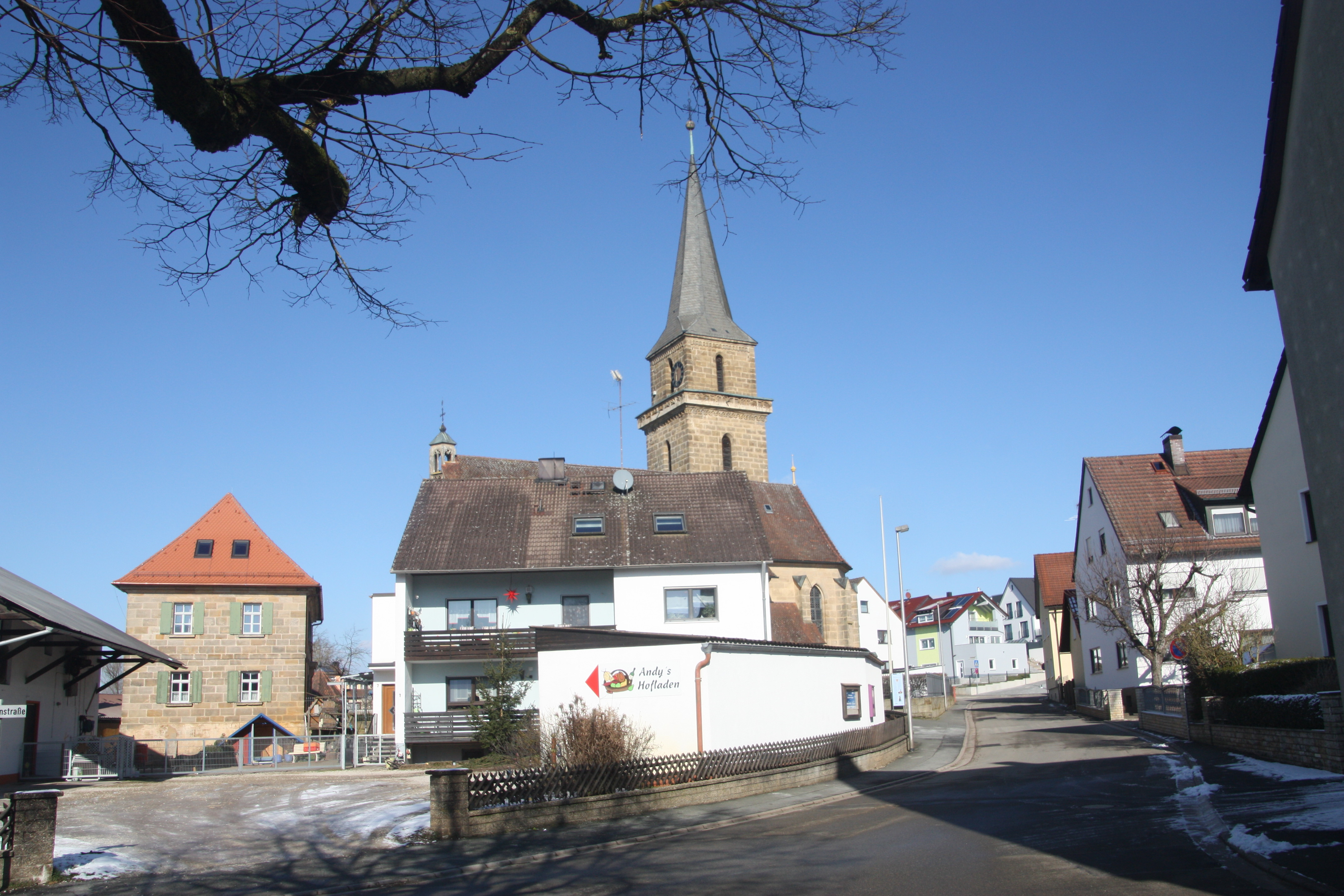
- Church of the Annunciation of the Virgin Mary

- Coat of arms

- Location of Dormitz within Forchheim district
- Interactive map of Dormitz
- Location within Germany Location within Bavaria
- Coordinates: 49°36′N 11°07′E
- Country: Germany
- State: Bavaria
- Admin. region: Oberfranken
- District: Forchheim
- Municipal assoc.: Dormitz

Government
  - Mayor (2020–26): Holger Bezold (FW)

Area
  - Total: 4.58 km^{2} (1.77 sq mi)
- Elevation: 305 m (1,001 ft)

Population (2025-12-31)
  - Total: 1,919
  - Density: 419/km^{2} (1,090/sq mi)
- Time zone: UTC+01:00 (CET)
  - Summer (DST): UTC+02:00 (CEST)
- Postal codes: 91077
- Dialling codes: 09134
- Vehicle registration: FO
- Website: www.dormitz.de

Dormitz is a Bavarian municipality in the district of Forchheim (Upper Franconia) and the administrative headquarters of the Dormitz community, which includes the parishes of Kleinsendelbach and Hetzles.

== History ==
Dormitz was first mentioned in 1142 and 1146 in two documents.
