= Effeltrich (Verwaltungsgemeinschaft) =

- Verwaltungsgemeinschaft
- Location of Effeltrich within Forchheim district
- Interactive map of Effeltrich
- Location within Germany Location within Bavaria
- Coordinates: 49°40′N 11°06′E
- Country: Germany
- State: Bavaria
- Admin. region: Upper Franconia
- District: Forchheim
- Seat: Effeltrich
- Subdivisions: 2 municipalities

Area
  - Total: 17.1 km^{2} (6.6 sq mi)

Population (2025-12-31)
  - Total: 4,006
  - Density: 234/km^{2} (607/sq mi)
- Time zone: UTC+01:00 (CET)
  - Summer (DST): UTC+02:00 (CEST)
- Website: vg-effeltrich.de

Effeltrich is a Verwaltungsgemeinschaft (municipal association) in the district of Forchheim in Bavaria, Germany. Its seat is in Effeltrich.

It consists of the following municipalities:

1. Effeltrich
2. Poxdorf
