= Wiesenttal =

- Municipality
- Coat of arms

- Location of Wiesenttal within Forchheim district
- Interactive map of Wiesenttal
- Location within Germany Location within Bavaria
- Coordinates: 49°47′N 11°16′E
- Country: Germany
- State: Bavaria
- Admin. region: Oberfranken
- District: Forchheim
- Subdivisions: 21 Ortsteile

Government
  - Mayor (2020–26): Marco Trautner

Area
  - Total: 45.89 km^{2} (17.72 sq mi)
- Elevation: 310 m (1,020 ft)

Population (2025-12-31)
  - Total: 2,524
  - Density: 55.00/km^{2} (142.5/sq mi)
- Time zone: UTC+01:00 (CET)
  - Summer (DST): UTC+02:00 (CEST)
- Postal codes: 91346
- Dialling codes: 09196
- Vehicle registration: FO
- Website: www.wiesenttal.de

Wiesenttal (German pronunciation: [ˈviːzɛntˌtaːl], lit. 'Wiesent Valley') is a municipality in the district of Forchheim in Bavaria in Germany.

== Municipal subdivisions ==
Wiesenttal is divided into 21 Gemeindeteile (quarters):

- Albertshof
- Birkenreuth
- Draisendorf
- Engelhardsberg
- Gößmannsberg
- Haag
- Kuchenmühle
- Muggendorf
- Neudorf
- Niederfellendorf
- Oberfellendorf
- Rauhenberg
- Schottersmühle
- Störnhof
- Streitberg
- Trainmeusel
- Voigendorf
- Wartleiten
- Wohlmannsgesees
- Wöhr
- Wüstenstein
