= Poxdorf =

- Municipality
- Coat of arms

- Location of Poxdorf within Forchheim district
- Interactive map of Poxdorf
- Location within Germany Location within Bavaria
- Coordinates: 49°40′N 11°04′E
- Country: Germany
- State: Bavaria
- Admin. region: Oberfranken
- District: Forchheim
- Municipal assoc.: Effeltrich

Government
  - Mayor (2020–26): Paul Steins

Area
  - Total: 5.16 km^{2} (1.99 sq mi)
- Elevation: 278 m (912 ft)

Population (2025-12-31)
  - Total: 1,565
  - Density: 303/km^{2} (786/sq mi)
- Time zone: UTC+01:00 (CET)
  - Summer (DST): UTC+02:00 (CEST)
- Postal codes: 91099
- Dialling codes: 09133
- Vehicle registration: FO
- Website: www.poxdorf.de

Poxdorf (German pronunciation: [ˈpɔksdɔʁf]) is a municipality in the district of Forchheim in Bavaria in Germany.
