= Dormitz (Verwaltungsgemeinschaft) =

- Verwaltungsgemeinschaft
- Location of Dormitz within Forchheim district
- Interactive map of Dormitz
- Location within Germany Location within Bavaria
- Coordinates: 49°36′N 11°07′E
- Country: Germany
- State: Bavaria
- Admin. region: Upper Franconia
- District: Forchheim
- Seat: Dormitz
- Subdivisions: 3 municipalities

Area
  - Total: 23.85 km^{2} (9.21 sq mi)

Population (2025-12-31)
  - Total: 4,743
  - Density: 198.9/km^{2} (515.1/sq mi)
- Time zone: UTC+01:00 (CET)
  - Summer (DST): UTC+02:00 (CEST)
- Website: www.vgdormitz.de

Dormitz is a Verwaltungsgemeinschaft (municipal association) in the district of Forchheim in Bavaria, Germany. Its seat is in Dormitz.

It consists of the following municipalities:

1. Dormitz
2. Hetzles
3. Kleinsendelbach
