= Aubach (Schwabach) =

River in Bavaria, Germany

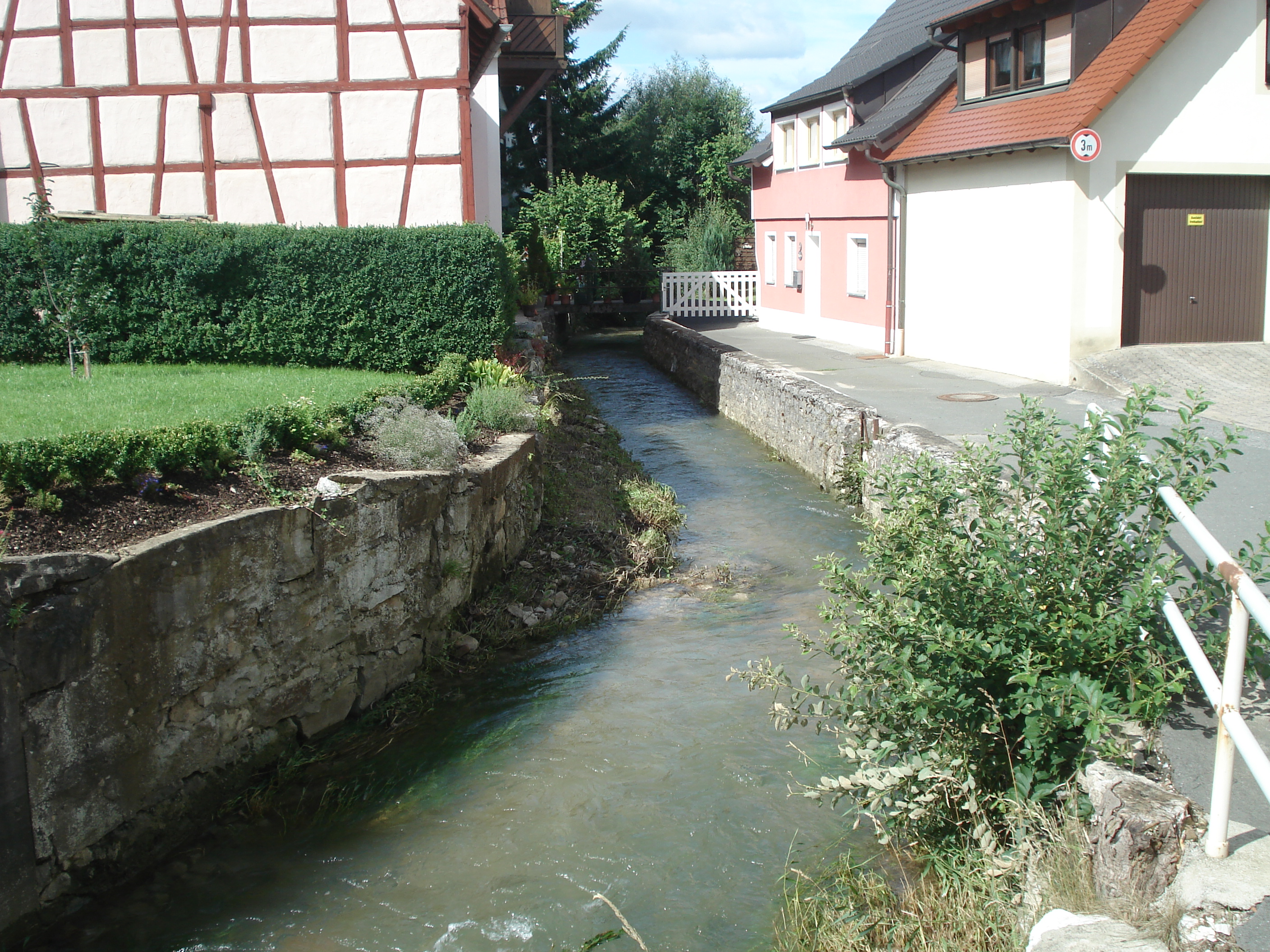
- The Aubach in Mitteldorf (part of Igensdorf)

- Location of mouth

Location
- Country: Germany
- State: Bavaria

Physical characteristics
- Mouth
  - location: Schwabach
  - coordinates: 49°36′31″N 11°13′47″E

Basin features
- Progression: Schwabach→ Regnitz→ Main→ Rhine→ North Sea

Aubach is a river in Bavaria, Germany. It is a left tributary of the Schwabach near Igensdorf.

== See also ==
- List of rivers of Bavaria
