= Effeltrich =

- Municipality
- Parish Church of Saint George

- Coat of arms

- Location of Effeltrich within Forchheim district
- Interactive map of Effeltrich
- Location within Germany Location within Bavaria
- Coordinates: 49°39′35″N 11°5′32″E
- Country: Germany
- State: Bavaria
- Admin. region: Oberfranken
- District: Forchheim
- Municipal assoc.: Effeltrich

Government
  - Mayor (2020–26): Peter Lepper (FW)

Area
  - Total: 11.92 km^{2} (4.60 sq mi)
- Elevation: 303 m (994 ft)

Population (2025-12-31)
  - Total: 2,441
  - Density: 204.8/km^{2} (530.4/sq mi)
- Time zone: UTC+01:00 (CET)
  - Summer (DST): UTC+02:00 (CEST)
- Postal codes: 91090
- Dialling codes: 09133
- Vehicle registration: FO
- Website: www.effeltrich.de

Effeltrich is a municipality in the district of Forchheim in Bavaria in Germany.

== See also ==
- Tanzlinde (Effeltrich)
