= Gräfenberg, Bavaria =

Gräfenberg
- Town
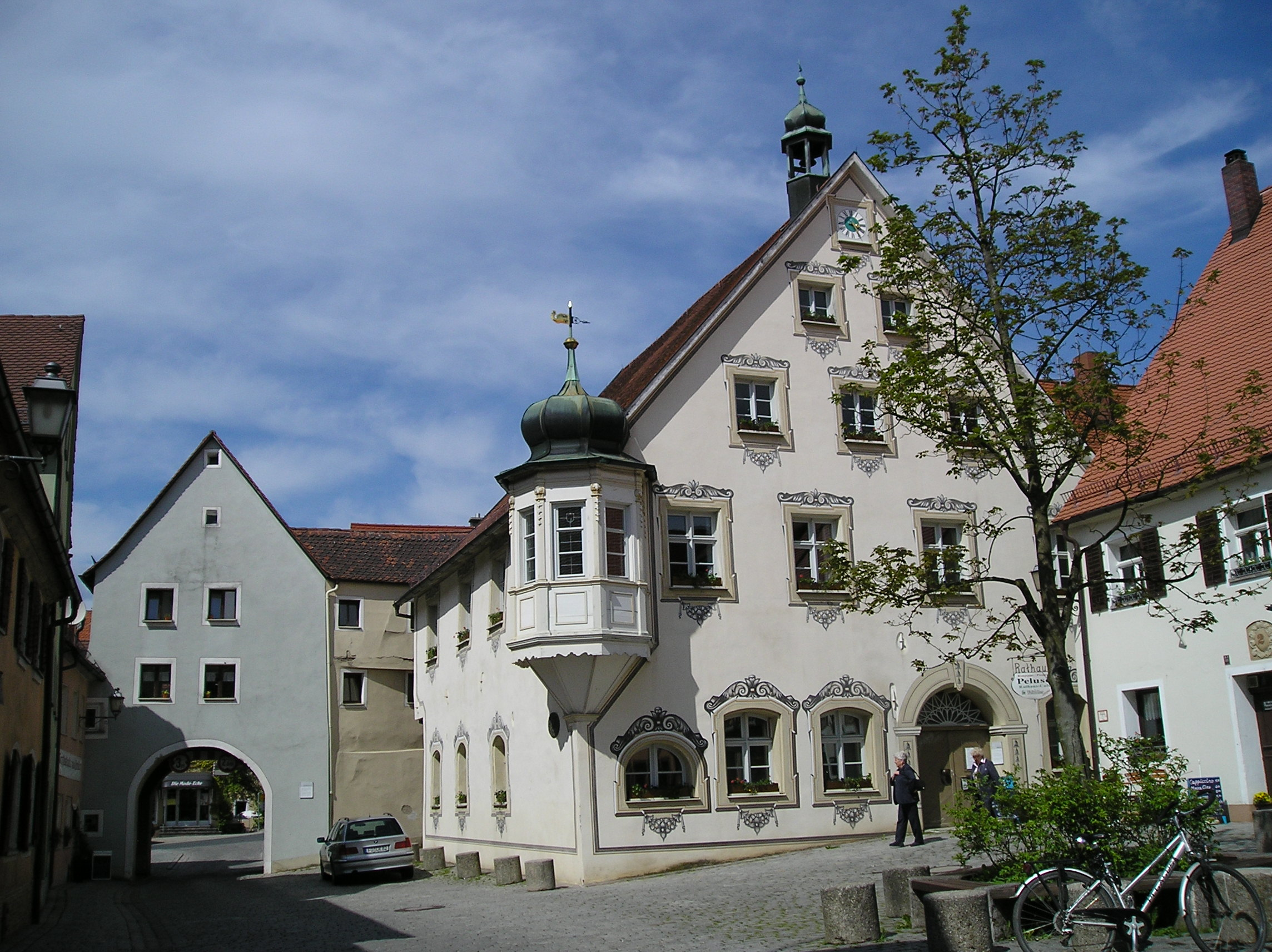
- Old town hall

- Coat of arms

- Location of Gräfenberg within Forchheim district
- Interactive map of Gräfenberg
- Location within Germany Location within Bavaria
- Coordinates: 49°38′N 11°15′E
- Country: Germany
- State: Bavaria
- Admin. region: Oberfranken
- District: Forchheim
- Municipal assoc.: Gräfenberg

Government
  - Mayor (2020–26): Ralf Kunzmann (FW)

Area
  - Total: 37.83 km^{2} (14.61 sq mi)
- Elevation: 433 m (1,421 ft)

Population (2025-12-31)
  - Total: 4,181
  - Density: 110.5/km^{2} (286.2/sq mi)
- Time zone: UTC+01:00 (CET)
  - Summer (DST): UTC+02:00 (CEST)
- Postal codes: 91322
- Dialling codes: 09192
- Vehicle registration: FO
- Website: www.graefenberg.de

Gräfenberg (German pronunciation: [ˈɡʁɛːfn̩bɛʁk]) is a Franconian town in the district of Forchheim, in Bavaria, Germany. It is situated 16 km southeast of Forchheim and 25 km northeast of Nuremberg.

== Location ==
Gräfenberg is located in the southern part of Little Switzerland. The town is characterised by a great range of elevation (from 400 to 550 metres). A brook, the Kalkach, flows through the town with a steep drop.

Gräfenberg is divided into 16 districts:

- The town Gräfenberg
- Lilling
- Hohenschwärz
- Kasberg
- Walkersbrunn
- Dörnhof
- Thuisbrunn
- Höfles
- Sollenberg
- Rangen
- Haidhof
- Schlichenreuth
- Guttenburg
- Neusles
- Lillinger Höhe
- Gräfenberger Hüll

== Pictures ==
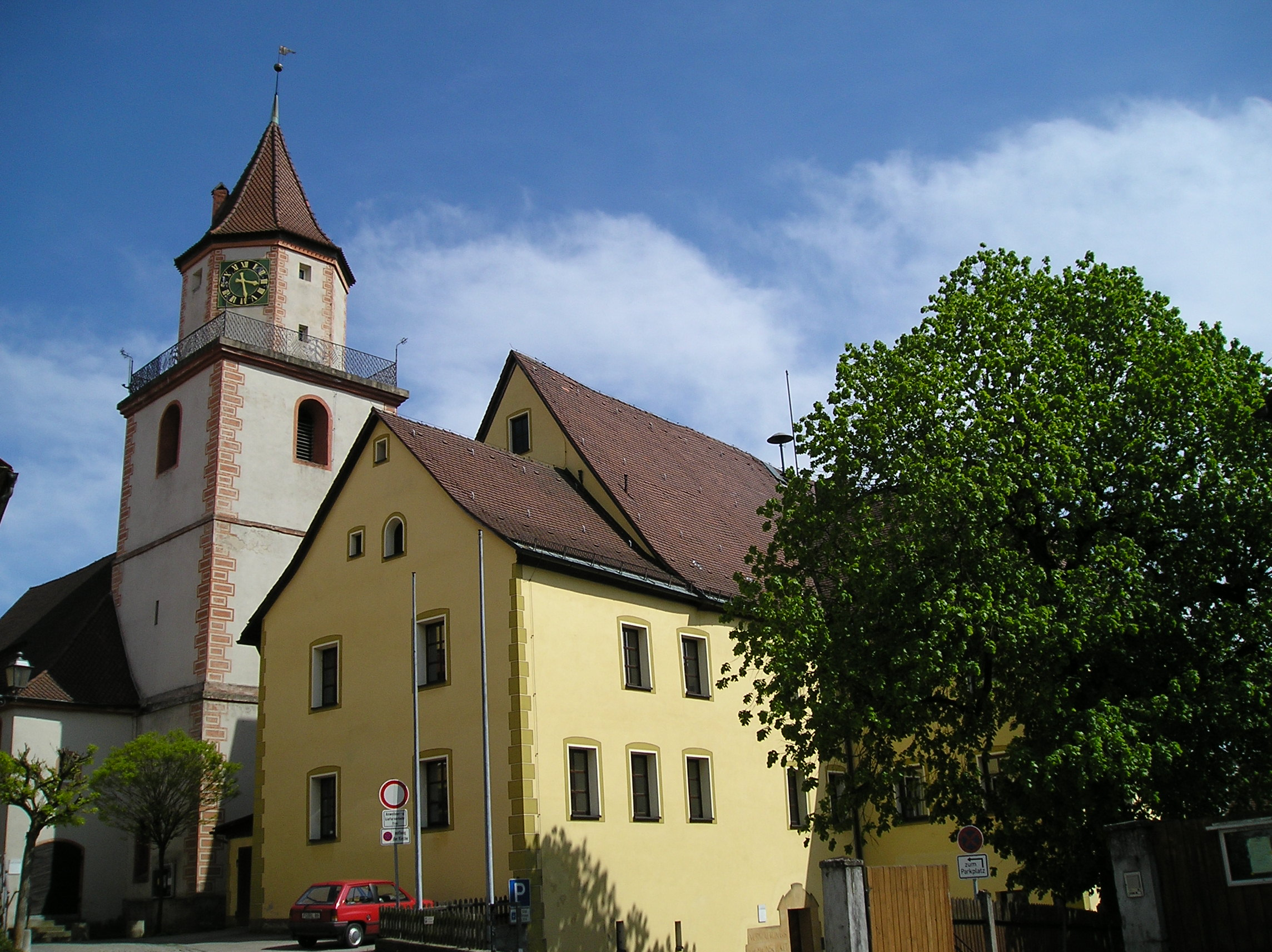
Town church and town hall

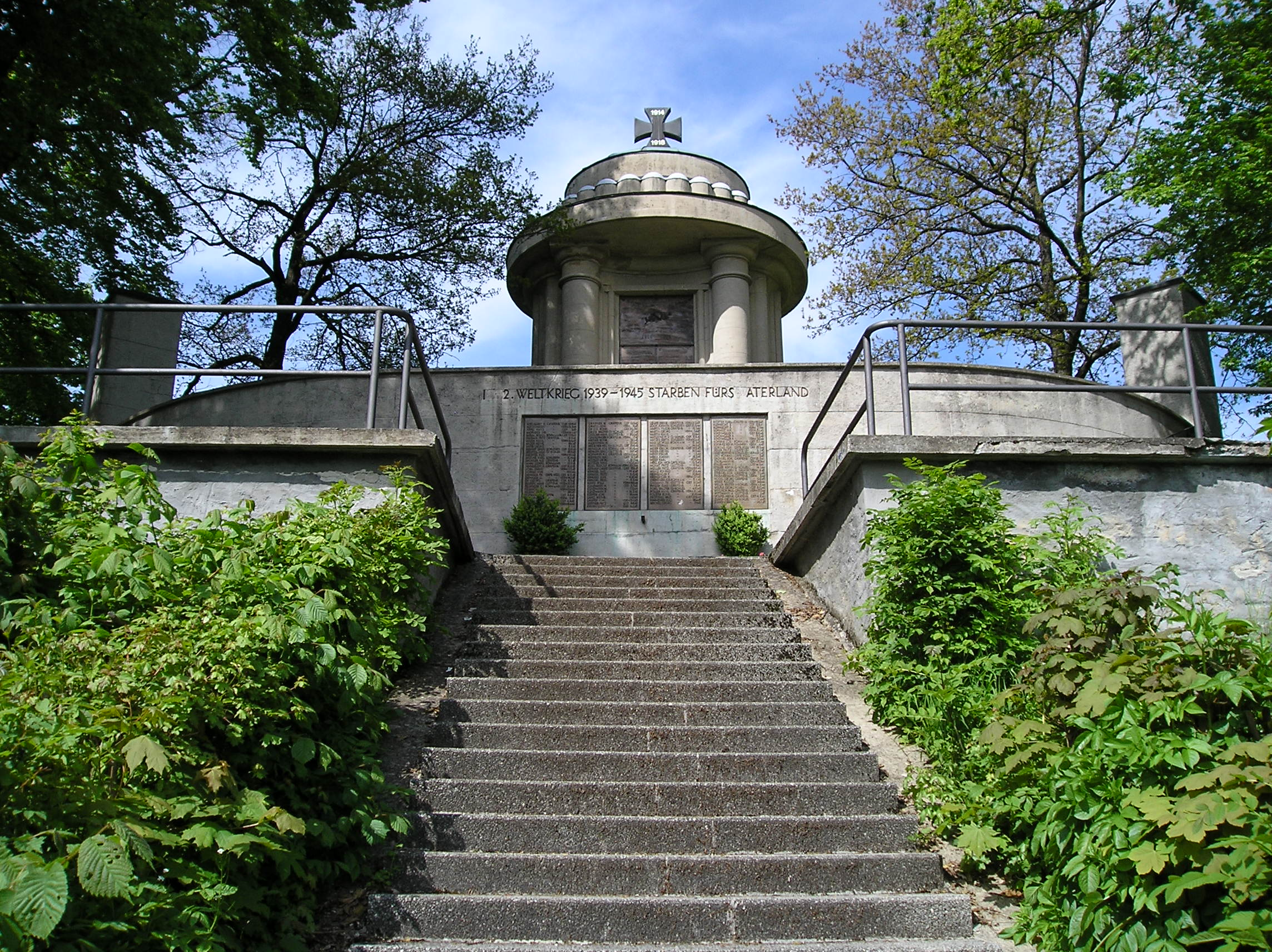
Memorial for the fallen of World War I and II above the town.

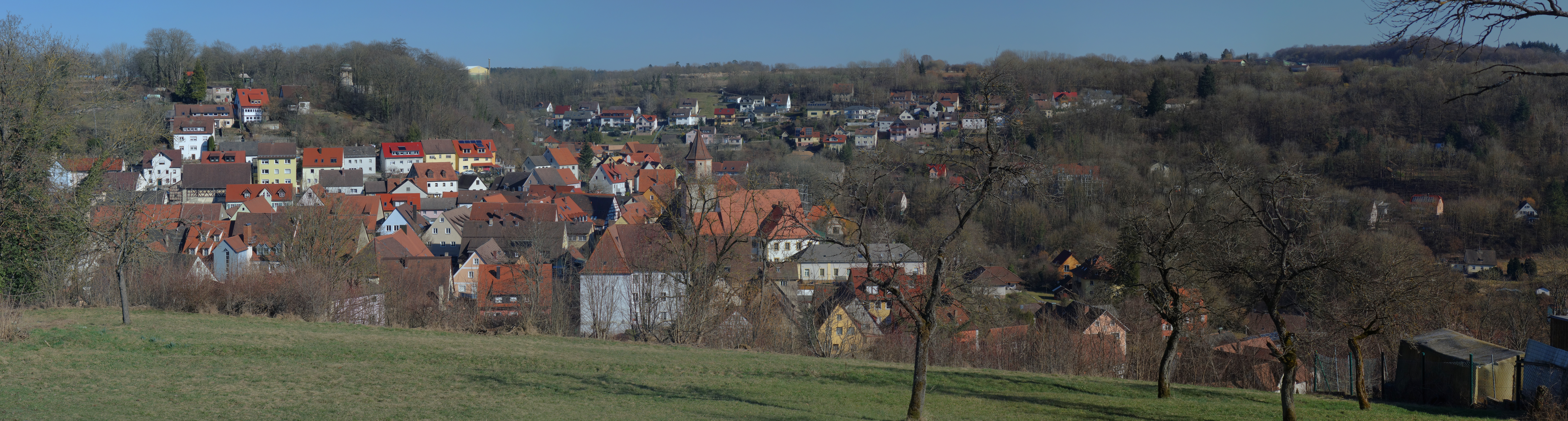
A panorama of the center and eastern part of Gräfenberg.

== Religion ==
Gräfenberg is a majority Protestant town; even so, some districts (Lilling, Sollenberg) are majority Catholic.

== History ==
Gräfenberg was first mentioned in the year 1172. From 1333 onward the patrician family Haller reigned in Gräfenberg. In 1371 King Karl IV granted the market municipal law. In 1567 a fire destroyed the parts of town located back of the walls. In 1778 a flood wave, resulting from heavy rainfalls, killed six people. With the Reichsdeputationshauptschluss in 1803 the town became part of Bavaria. In the Austro-Prussian War between the German Confederation (which included Bavaria), and Prussia and her allies, the town was the headquarters of the Prussian army at the time that the ceasefire between Bavaria and Prussia was declared in 1866.

In the 1960s and 1970s the other districts of Gräfenberg became part of the borough: for example Lilling (first mentioned 1205) and Thuisbrunn (first mentioned 1007).

== Local council ==
Local elections were held on March 15, 2020 with the following results:

- Christian Social Union in Bavaria 4 seats
- Alliance '90/The Greens 2 seats
- Free voters Bavaria 5 seats
- Social Democratic Party of Germany 3 seats
- Gräfenberg citizens (GBL) 2 seats

== Mayors ==
Ralf Kunzmann (Free Voters Bavaria) is the mayor since May 1, 2020. He won the election on March 29, 2020 against his predecessor Hans-Jürgen Nekolla (SPD) with 52,55 % of the vote.
