= Kirchehrenbach =

- Municipality
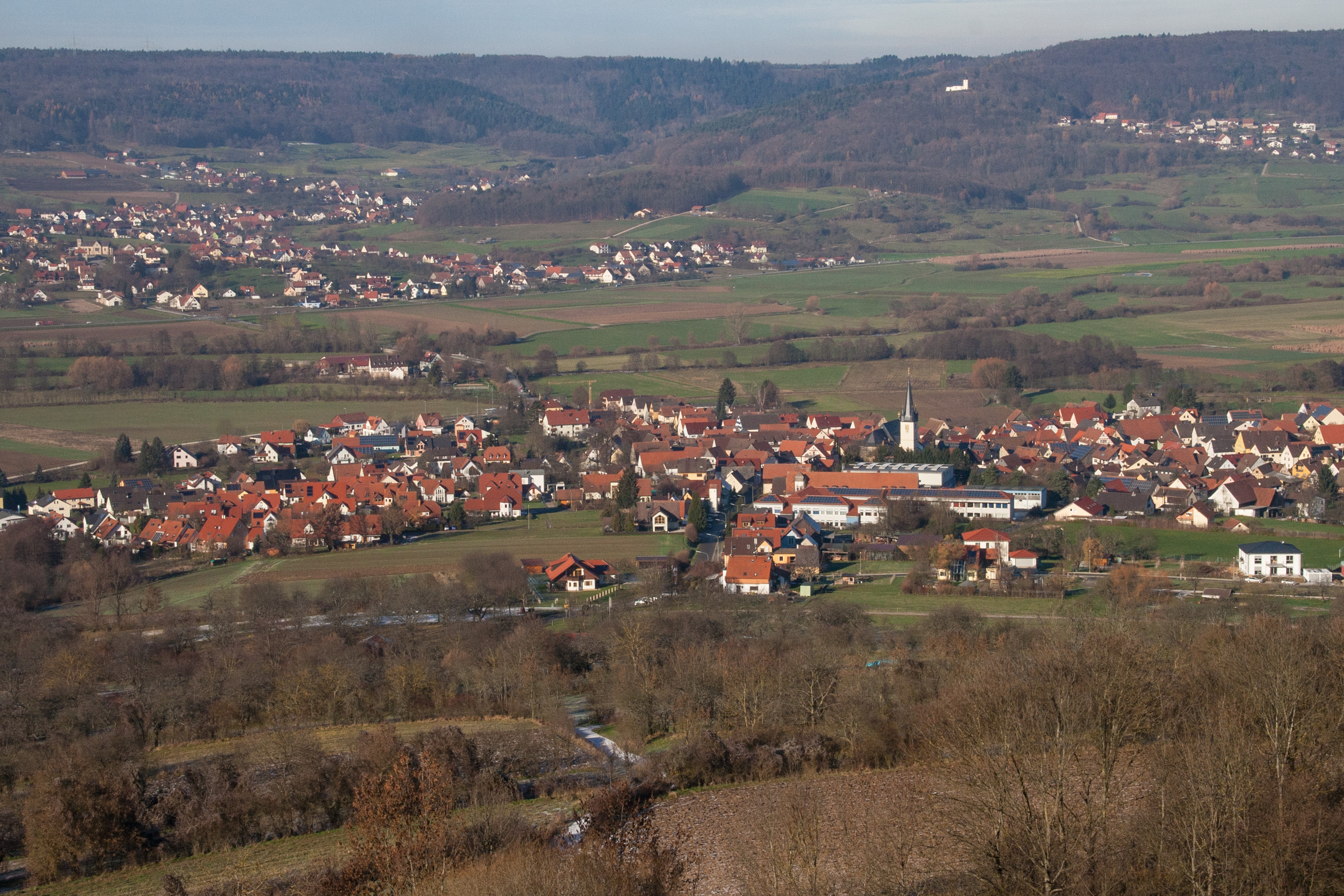
- Kirchehrenbach

- Coat of arms

- Location of Kirchehrenbach within Forchheim district
- Interactive map of Kirchehrenbach
- Location within Germany Location within Bavaria
- Coordinates: 49°44′N 11°09′E
- Country: Germany
- State: Bavaria
- Admin. region: Oberfranken
- District: Forchheim
- Municipal assoc.: Kirchehrenbach

Government
  - Mayor (2020–26): Anja Gebhardt (SPD)

Area
  - Total: 8.24 km^{2} (3.18 sq mi)
- Elevation: 282 m (925 ft)

Population (2025-12-31)
  - Total: 2,163
  - Density: 263/km^{2} (680/sq mi)
- Time zone: UTC+01:00 (CET)
  - Summer (DST): UTC+02:00 (CEST)
- Postal codes: 91356
- Dialling codes: 09191
- Vehicle registration: FO
- Website: www.kirchehrenbach.de

Kirchehrenbach is a municipality in the district of Forchheim in Bavaria in Germany.
