= Unterleinleiter =

- Municipality
- Coat of arms

- Location of Unterleinleiter within Forchheim district
- Interactive map of Unterleinleiter
- Location within Germany Location within Bavaria
- Coordinates: 49°49′N 11°11′E
- Country: Germany
- State: Bavaria
- Admin. region: Oberfranken
- District: Forchheim
- Municipal assoc.: Ebermannstadt

Government
  - Mayor (2020–26): Alwin Gebhardt

Area
  - Total: 12.48 km^{2} (4.82 sq mi)
- Elevation: 319 m (1,047 ft)

Population (2025-12-31)
  - Total: 1,239
  - Density: 99.28/km^{2} (257.1/sq mi)
- Time zone: UTC+01:00 (CET)
  - Summer (DST): UTC+02:00 (CEST)
- Postal codes: 91364
- Dialling codes: 09194
- Vehicle registration: FO
- Website: www.unterleinleiter.de

Unterleinleiter is a municipality in the district of Forchheim in Bavaria in Germany.
