= Weißenohe =

- Municipality
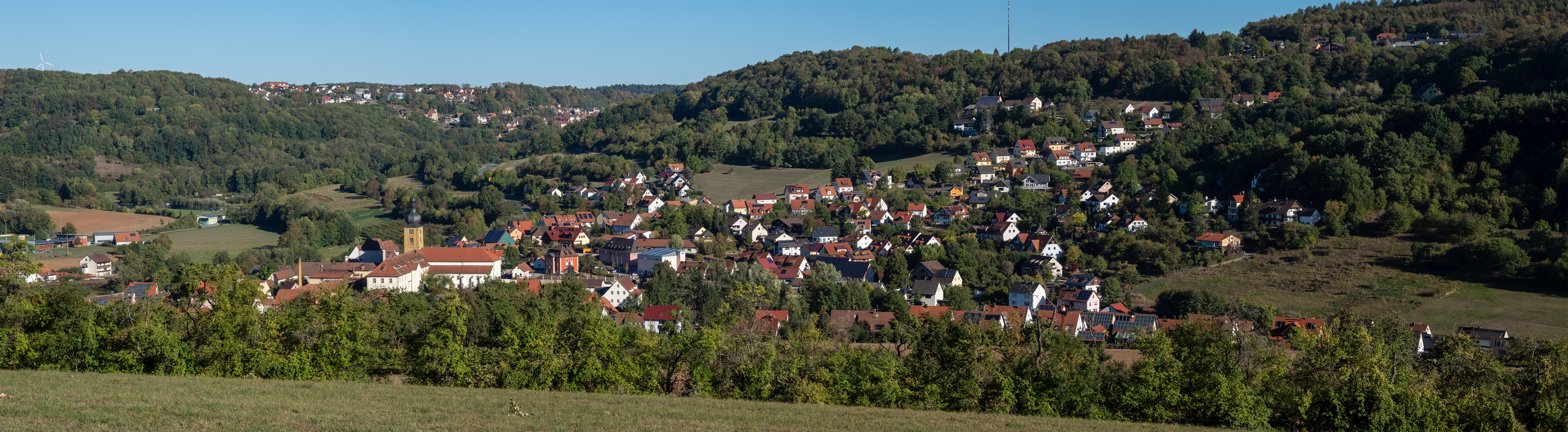
- Panorama of Weißenohe

- Coat of arms

- Location of Weißenohe within Forchheim district
- Interactive map of Weißenohe
- Location within Germany Location within Bavaria
- Coordinates: 49°37′N 11°15′E
- Country: Germany
- State: Bavaria
- Admin. region: Oberfranken
- District: Forchheim
- Municipal assoc.: Gräfenberg
- Subdivisions: 2 Ortsteile

Government
  - Mayor (2020–26): Rudolf Braun

Area
  - Total: 4.69 km^{2} (1.81 sq mi)
- Elevation: 358 m (1,175 ft)

Population (2025-12-31)
  - Total: 1,161
  - Density: 248/km^{2} (641/sq mi)
- Time zone: UTC+01:00 (CET)
  - Summer (DST): UTC+02:00 (CEST)
- Postal codes: 91367
- Dialling codes: 09192
- Vehicle registration: FO
- Website: www.weissenohe.de

Weißenohe (German pronunciation: [ˈvaɪsn̩ˌʔoːə]) is a municipality in the district of Forchheim in Bavaria in Germany.
