= Wiesenthau =

- Municipality
- Coat of arms

- Location of Wiesenthau within Forchheim district
- Interactive map of Wiesenthau
- Location within Germany Location within Bavaria
- Coordinates: 49°43′N 11°08′E
- Country: Germany
- State: Bavaria
- Admin. region: Oberfranken
- District: Forchheim
- Municipal assoc.: Gosberg
- Subdivisions: 2 Ortsteile

Government
  - Mayor (2020–26): Bernd Drummer

Area
  - Total: 6.41 km^{2} (2.47 sq mi)
- Elevation: 305 m (1,001 ft)

Population (2025-12-31)
  - Total: 1,577
  - Density: 246/km^{2} (637/sq mi)
- Time zone: UTC+01:00 (CET)
  - Summer (DST): UTC+02:00 (CEST)
- Postal codes: 91369
- Dialling codes: 09191
- Vehicle registration: FO
- Website: www.wiesenthau.de

Wiesenthau is a municipality in the district of Forchheim in Bavaria in Germany.
