= Muggendorf (Wiesenttal) =

Village in Bavaria, Germany

Coordinates: 49°48′8″N 11°15′41″E

A view of Muggendorf from a viewpoint

Muggendorf (German pronunciation: [ˈmʊɡn̩dɔʁf]) is a village in municipality Wiesenttal in Franconian Switzerland, Bavaria, Germany.

== Geography ==
The village is located on the river Wiesent 304 m above mean sea level.
