= Schwabach (Regnitz) =

River in Germany

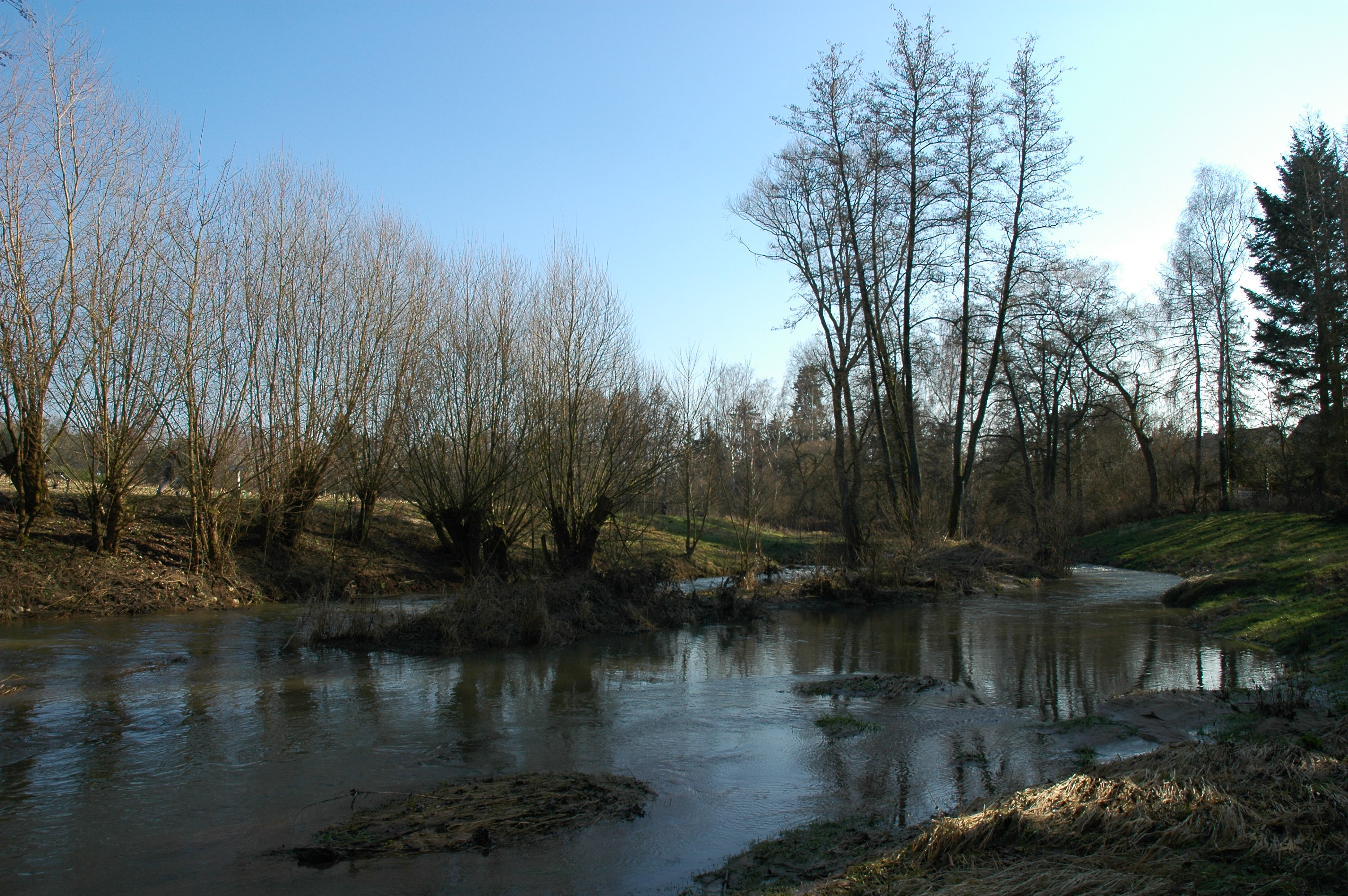
- The Schwabach in Erlangen

Location
- Country: Germany
- State: Bavaria

Physical characteristics
- Mouth
  - location: Regnitz
  - coordinates: 49.6086°N 10.9975°E
- Length: 32.4 km (20.1 mi)
- Basin size: 191 km^{2} (74 sq mi)

Basin features
- Progression: Regnitz→ Main→ Rhine→ North Sea

Schwabach is a river of Bavaria, Germany. It is a right tributary of the Regnitz in Erlangen.

== See also ==
- List of rivers of Bavaria
