= Leutenbach, Bavaria =

Leutenbach
- Municipality
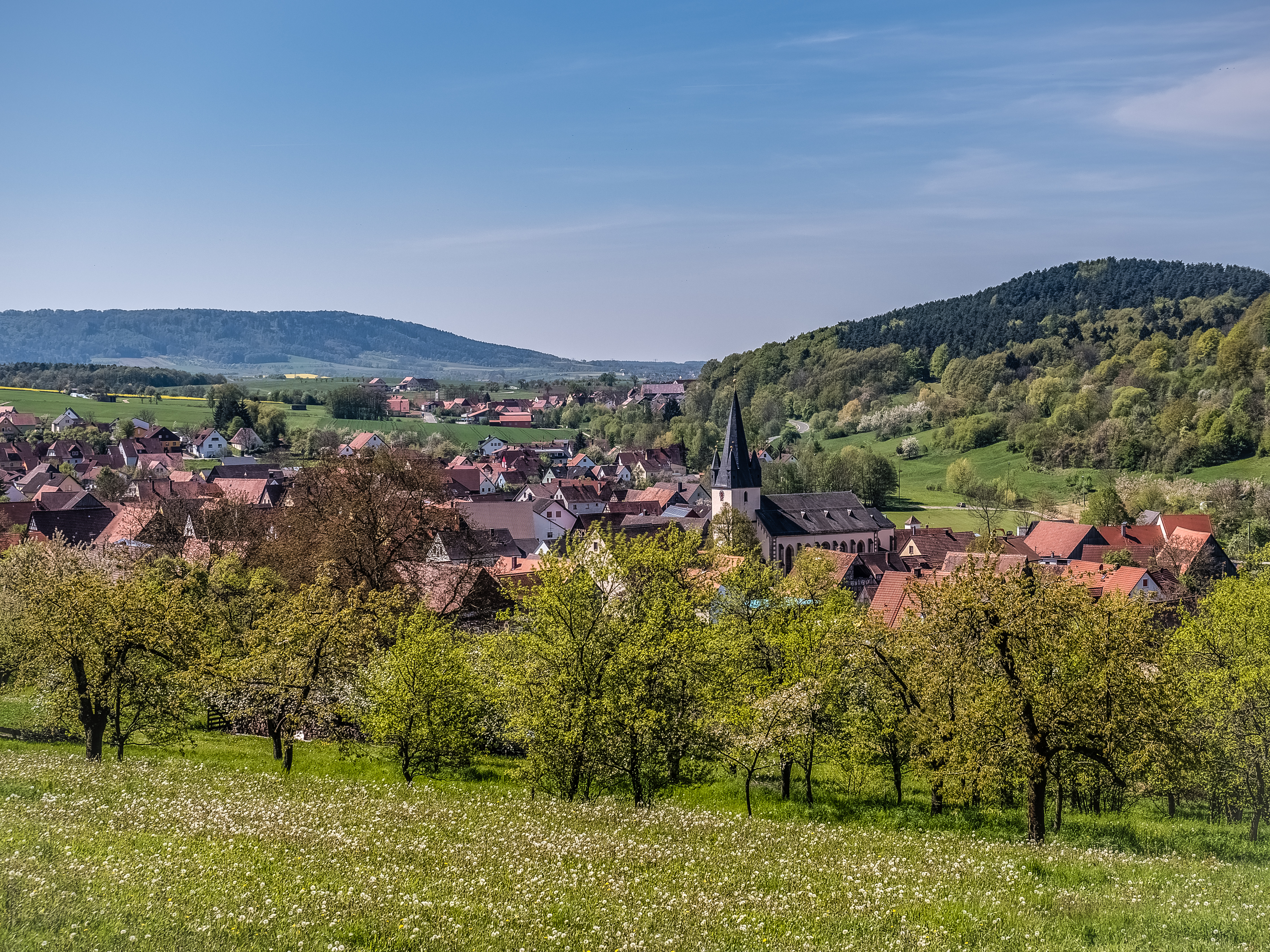
- General view of Leutenbach

- Coat of arms

- Location of Leutenbach within Forchheim district
- Interactive map of Leutenbach
- Location within Germany Location within Bavaria
- Coordinates: 49°42′47″N 11°10′20″E
- Country: Germany
- State: Bavaria
- Admin. region: Oberfranken
- District: Forchheim
- Municipal assoc.: Kirchehrenbach

Government
  - Mayor (2020–26): Florian Kraft (FW)

Area
  - Total: 19.41 km^{2} (7.49 sq mi)
- Elevation: 339 m (1,112 ft)

Population (2025-12-31)
  - Total: 1,660
  - Density: 85.5/km^{2} (222/sq mi)
- Time zone: UTC+01:00 (CET)
  - Summer (DST): UTC+02:00 (CEST)
- Postal codes: 91359
- Dialling codes: 09199
- Vehicle registration: FO
- Website: http://www.gemeinde-leutenbach.de/

Leutenbach (German pronunciation: [ˈlɔʏtn̩bax]) is a municipality in the district of Forchheim in Bavaria in Germany.
