= Forchheim (district) =

Coordinates: 49°45′N 11°05′E

- District
- Flag Coat of arms
- Country: Germany
- State: Bavaria
- Adm. region: Upper Franconia
- Capital: Forchheim

Government
  - District admin.: Hermann Ulm (CSU)

Area
  - Total: 643 km^{2} (248 sq mi)

Population (31 December 2025)
  - Total: 116,602
  - Density: 181/km^{2} (470/sq mi)
- Time zone: UTC+01:00 (CET)
  - Summer (DST): UTC+02:00 (CEST)
- Vehicle registration: EBS, FO
- Website: landkreis-forchheim.de

Forchheim is a Landkreis (district) in Bavaria, Germany. It is bounded by (from the north and clockwise) the districts of Bamberg, Bayreuth, Nürnberger Land and Erlangen-Höchstadt.

== History ==
Until 1803 the region was divided between the clerical state of Bamberg and the margravate of Brandenburg-Kulmbach centred in Bayreuth. Then it fell to Bavaria. The district in its present borders was established in 1972 by merging the former district of Forchheim with parts of the dissolved districts of Ebermannstadt and Pegnitz. The city of Forchheim lost its status as a district-free city and became the capital.

== Geography ==
The main river is the Regnitz, which runs from south to north through the western parts of the district. East of the river the land rises to the hills of the Frankish Alb.

== Coat of arms ==
The coat of arms displays:

- the lion of the clerical state of Bamberg
- the key is from the arms of the county of Schlüsselberg; these counts possessed many castles in the region, but their property was acquired by the bishops of Bamberg in the 14th century
- the trout symbolises the city of Forchheim (the word "Forchheim" literally could mean "home of the trouts" (=Forelle or old German Forche); however, most of the historians consider the name Forchheim coming more probably from "home of the pine trees" (= Föhre, which is the most frequent tree in this region).

== Towns and municipalities ==
Clickable map of towns and municipalities in the district

Towns
1. Forchheim
Märkte
1. Eggolsheim
2. Egloffstein
3. Gößweinstein
4. Igensdorf
5. Neunkirchen am Brand
6. Pretzfeld
7. Wiesenttal
Municipalities
1. Hallerndorf
2. Hausen
3. Heroldsbach
4. Langensendelbach
5. Obertrubach

Verwaltungsgemeinschaften
1. Dormitz; 1. Dormitz^{1}; 2. Hetzles; 3. Kleinsendelbach	2. Ebermannstadt; 1. Ebermannstadt^{1,2}; 2. Unterleinleiter; 3. Effeltrich; 1. Effeltrich^{1}; 2. Poxdorf	4. Gosberg; 1. Kunreuth; 2. Pinzberg^{1}; 3. Wiesenthau	5. Gräfenberg; 1. Gräfenberg^{1,2}; 2. Hiltpoltstein^{3}; 3. Weißenohe	6. Kirchehrenbach; 1. Kirchehrenbach^{1}; 2. Leutenbach; 3. Weilersbach
^{1}seat of the Verwaltungsgemeinschaft; ^{2}town; ^{3}Markt
