= Wolfsberg Castle (Obertrubach) =

Castle in Germany

- Burgruine Wolfsberg
- Obertrubach-Wolfsberg
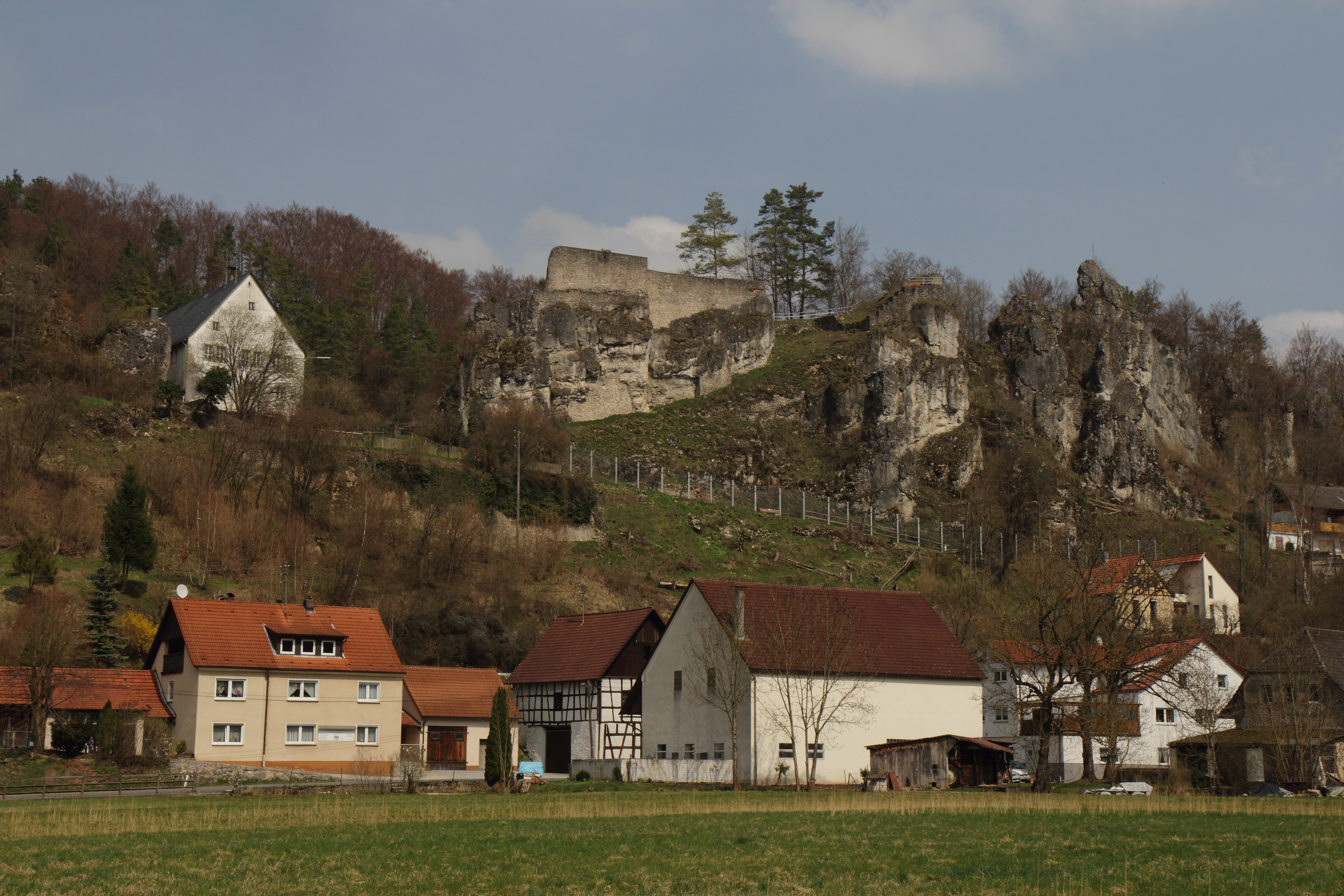
- The ruins of the Wolfsberg – view from the southwest

Site information
- Type: hill castle, spur castle
- Code: DE-BY
- Condition: restored ruins

Location
- Coordinates: 49°41′20″N 11°18′41″E
- Height: 436 m above sea level (NN)

Site history
- Built: c. 1150
- Materials: rubble stone walls

Garrison information
- Occupants: free knights; later, ministeriales

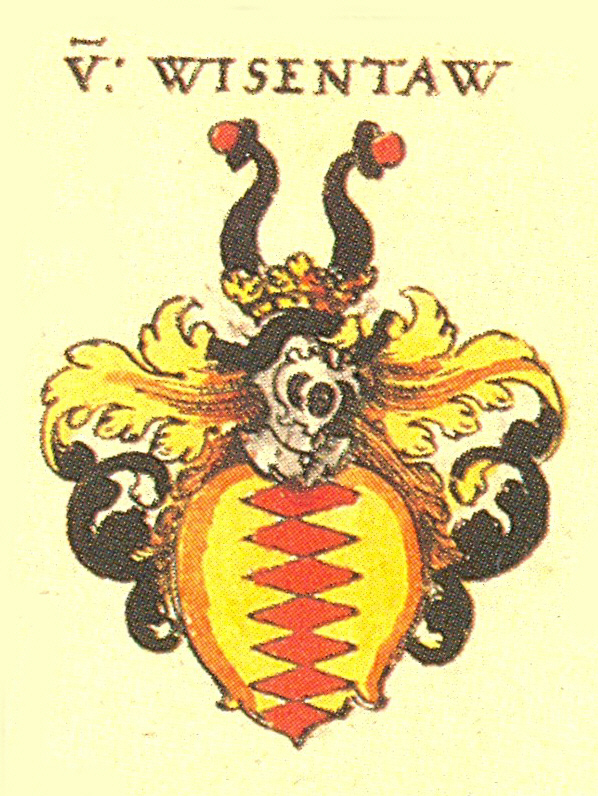
Wiesenthau coat of arms according to Siebmacher's armorial

The ruins of Wolfsberg Castle (German: Burgruine Wolfsberg) are the remains of a former high mediaeval, aristocratic, castle which stands high above the Trubach valley over the eponymous village of Wolfsberg. The village is part of the municipality of Obertrubach in the Upper Franconian county of Forchheim in the German state of Bavaria.

The upper bailey is permanently open to the public and serves as a viewing point; the lower bailey is partly in private ownership and is not accessible.

== Location ==
The ruins of this spur castle lie within the Franconian Switzerland-Veldenstein Forest Nature Park on an eastwards-pointing hill spur at a height of 436 metres. The spur is separated by a natural saddle from the plateau to the west. The spur sits between the Trubach valley to the south and a dry valley on the northern side of the spur that opens into the Trubach valley.

The ruins may be reached from the village of Wolfsberg.

Egloffstein Castle can be seen below in the Trubach valley; in the opposite direction is a burgstall in Obertrubach, the ruins of Bärnfels Castle and Leienfels Castle. To the south stands Hiltpoltstein Castle.

== History ==
Wolfsberg Castle was probably built around 1150 by the free knights of Wolfsberg. The lords of Wolfsberg are first recorded in 1169 when a certain Gozpold de Wolfesperch is mentioned. It is thought that they were descended from the family of free nobles of Schönfeld-Gößweinstein.

With the extinction of the lords of Wolfsberg around 1204 the castle went to the lords of Stein, ministeriales of the Bishops of Bamberg, who named themselves after the castle from 1244. Around 1333 the castle was sold to the lords of Egloffstein. In the deeds a Siboto of Egloffstein is mentioned as the occupier of the castle in 1358.

From 1383 the castle is mentioned among the estates of the Bishopric of Bamberg. It is unclear how this came about. The castle became the seat of an episcopal administrative office and was repeatedly enfeoffed from the 15th to the 17th centuries.

The castle was first destroyed in 1388 during the South German War of the Cities and was not rebuilt until 1408 under Amtmann Albert of Egloffstein. In the Peasants' War of 1525 the castle was wrecked again and rebuilt in 1547 under Philip of Egloffstein.

The last enfeoffee of the castle was William of Wiesenthau in 1568. Under him the castle became very neglected so that, at its reversion to the Bishopric in 1609, it was uninhabited and run down.

During the Thirty Years' War, further destruction was wrought by the Swedes in 1631 and 1632, and also in 1633 by Tilly's cavalry and Electoral Bavarian troops.

In 1803 the castle was seized by the Bavarian state, who let it stand empty. In 1823 it was sold for 50 guilders to the stonemason, Müller, from Brunn. He donated it to his son-in-law, who demolished the castle and sold it piecemeal.

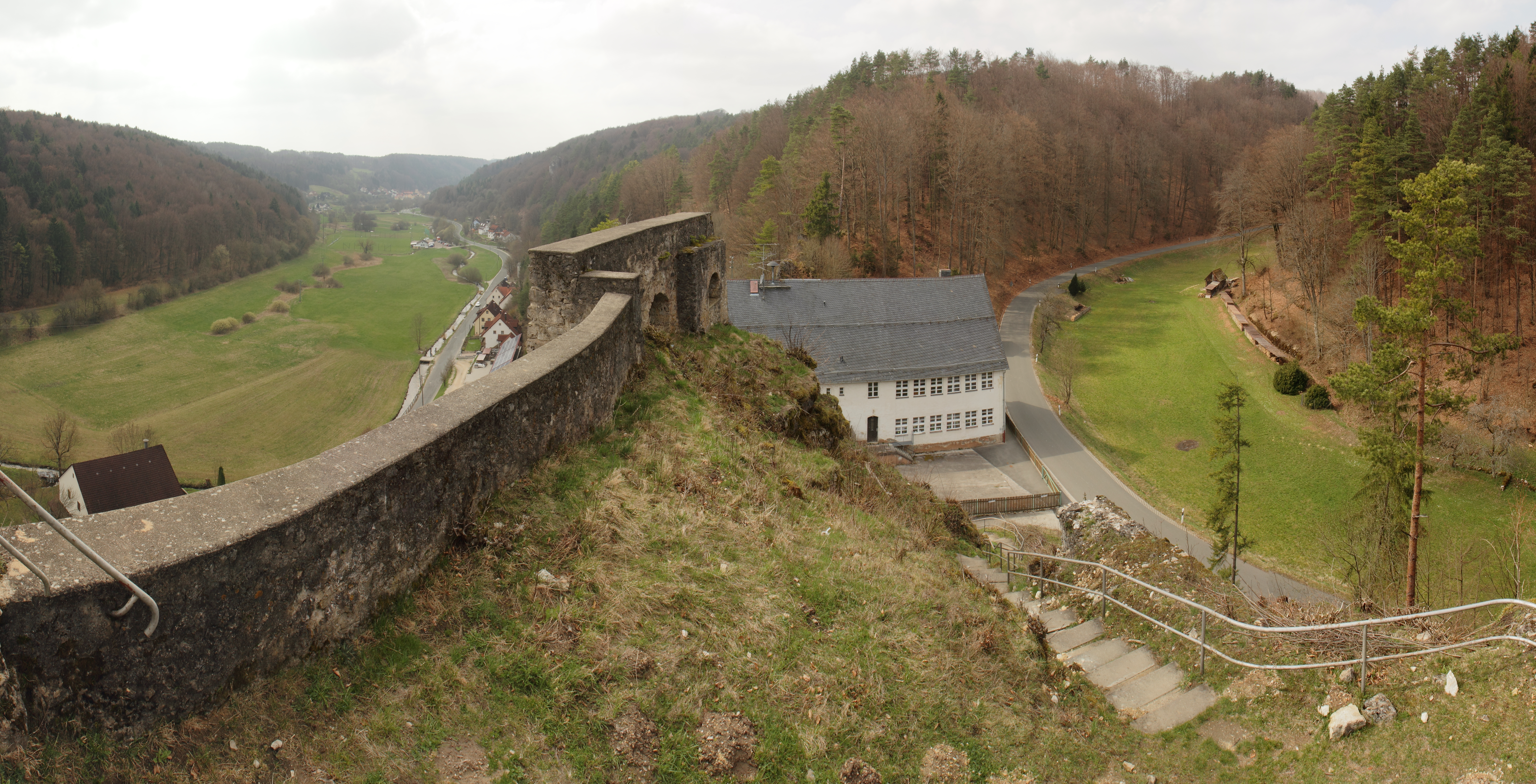
Location of the upper bailey between the Trubach valley (l) and a dry valley. (April 2013)

== Historical illustrations ==
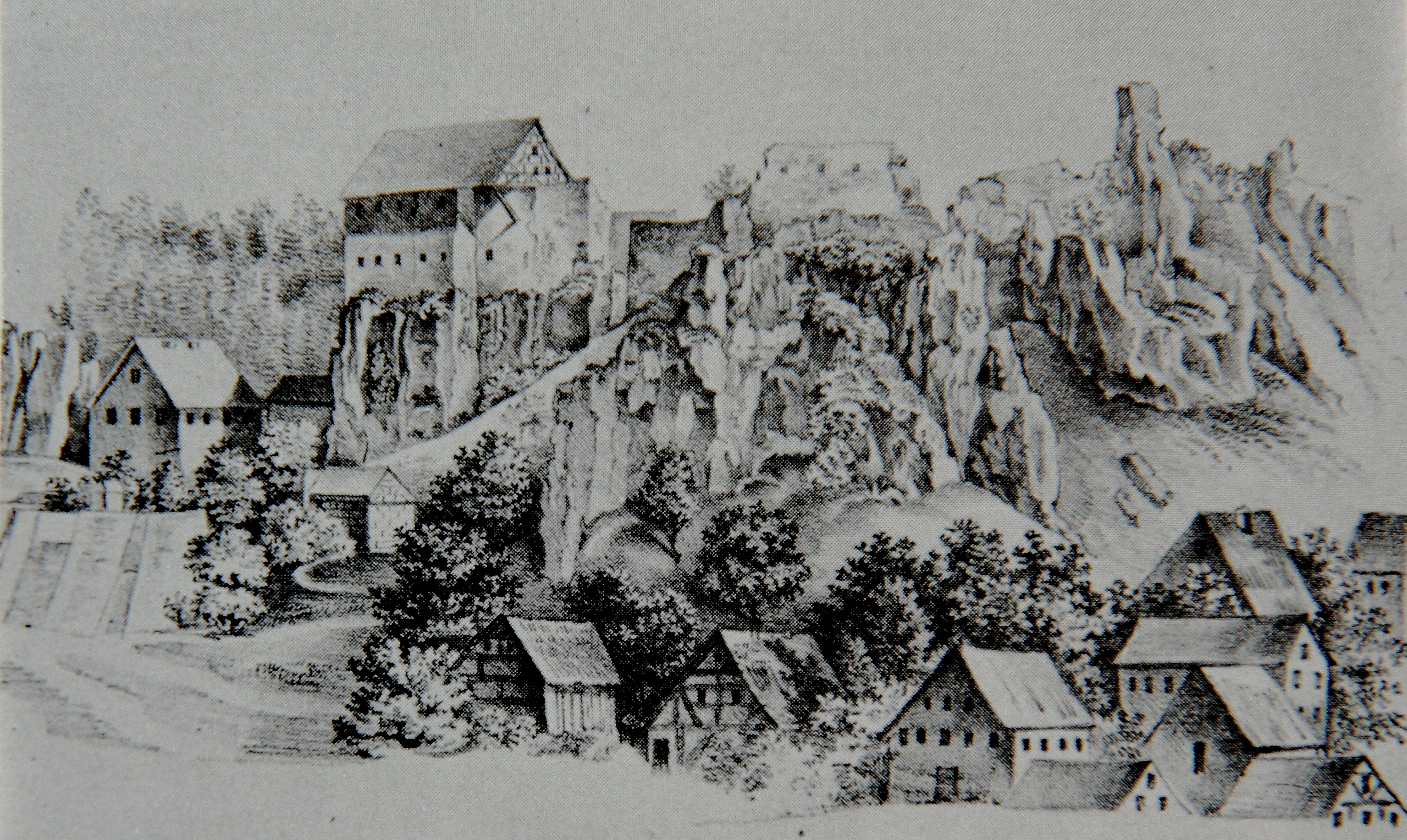
View of the Wolfsberg ruins from the south, c. 1809

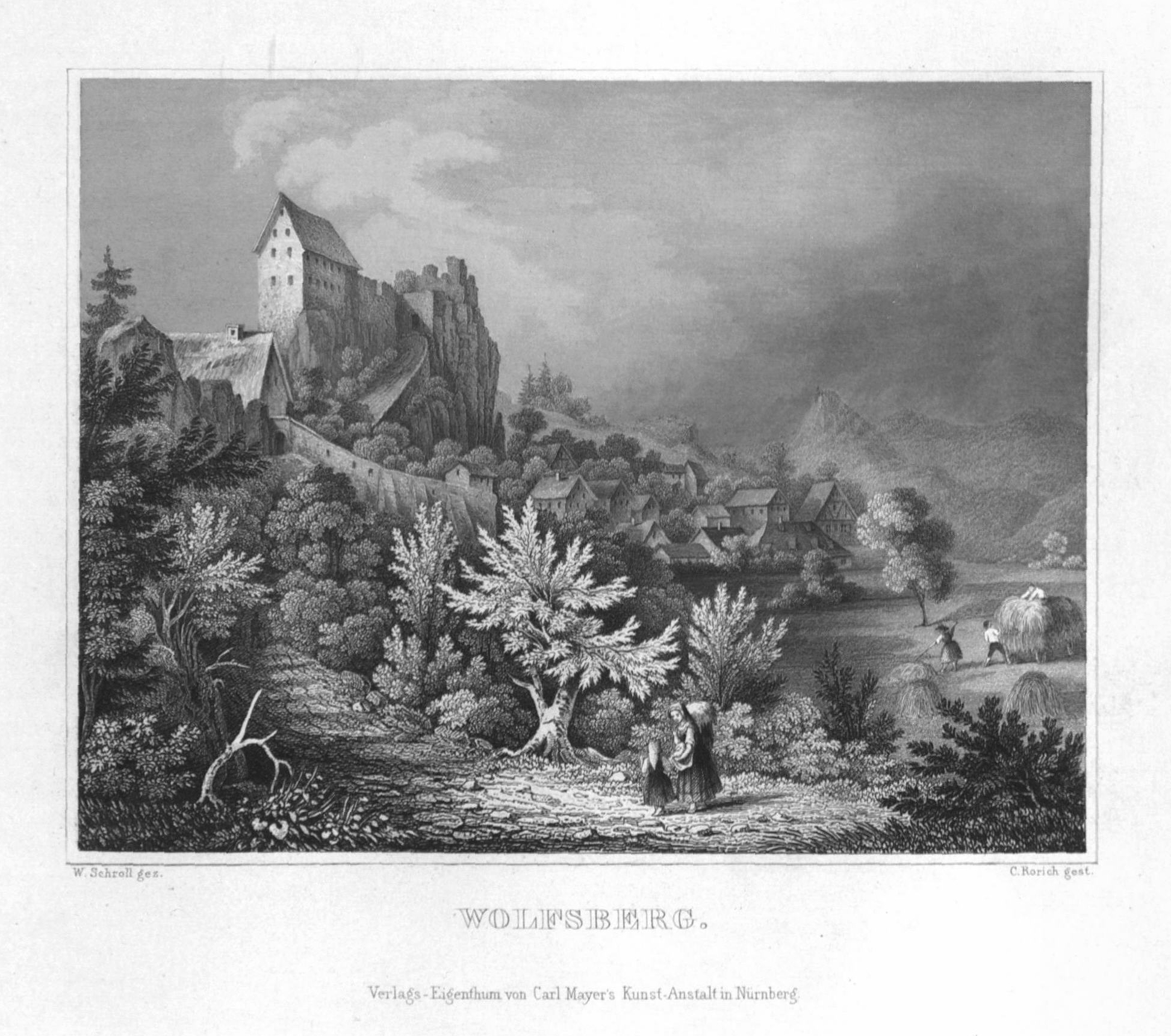
Wolfsberg Castle, 1858 steel engraving

== Literature ==
- Toni Eckert, Susanne Fischer, Renate Freitag, Rainer Hofmann, Walter Tausendpfund: Die Burgen der Fränkischen Schweiz. Gürtler Druck, Forchheim, 1997, ISBN 3-9803276-5-5, pp. 203–207.
- Walter Heinz: Ehemalige Adelssitze im Trubachtal. Verlag Palm und Enke, Erlangen und Jena, 1996, ISBN 3-7896-0554-9, pp. 58–78.
- Gustav Voit, Walter Rüfer: Eine Burgenreise durch die Fränkische Schweiz – Auf den Spuren des Zeichners A. F. Thomas Ostertag, 2nd edn., Verlag Palm & Enke, Erlangen, 1991, ISBN 3-7896-0064-4, pp. 234–238.
- Björn-Uwe Abels, Joachim Zeune, et al.: Führer zu archäologischen Denkmälern in Deutschland, Band 20: Fränkische Schweiz. Konrad Theiss Verlag, Stuttgart, 1990, ISBN 3-8062-0586-8, p. 201.
- Hellmut Kunstmann: Die Burgen der südwestlichen Fränkischen Schweiz. Kommissionsverlag Degener und Co, Neustadt an der Aisch, 1990, pp. 207–215.
- Karl Bosl: Handbuch der historischen Stätten Deutschlands, Band 7: Bayern. 3rd edition, Auflage, Alfred Kröner Verlag, Stuttgart, 1981, ISBN 3-520-27703-4.
