= House of Egloffstein =

Franconian house of nobility

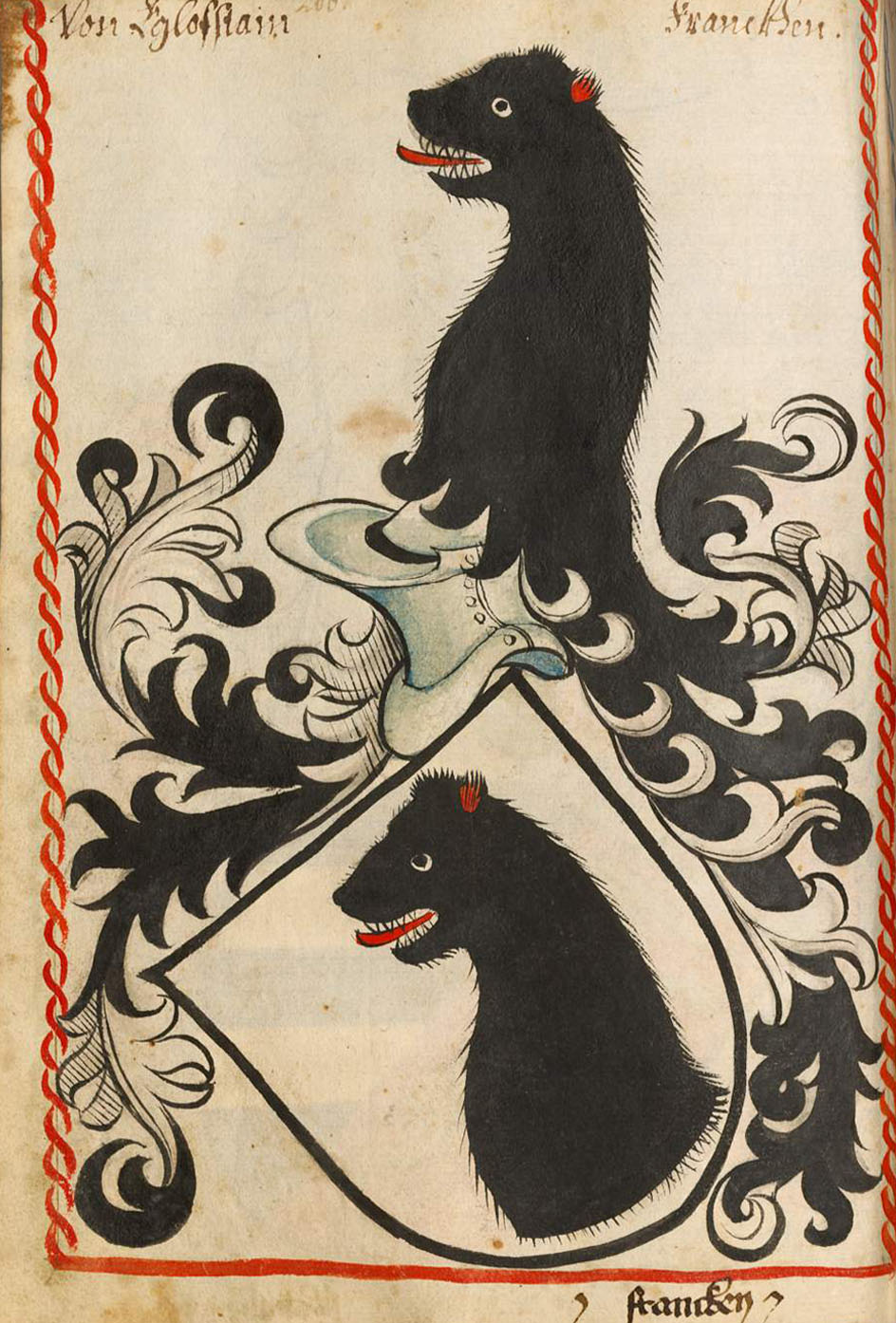
Egloffstein coat of arms

The House of Egloffstein is an ancient Franconian aristocratic family (Uradel) with an eponymous family home in the hill region of Franconian Switzerland in the Bavarian province of Upper Franconia. The family first appears in the records in 1187 with a Heinrich genannt Stuchs ("Henry, named Stuchs") who is also the progenitor. The house belongs to the brotherhood of Franconian Imperial Knights. Egloffstein Castle and Kunreuth Castle are to this day owned by the family.

== History ==
=== Franconia ===
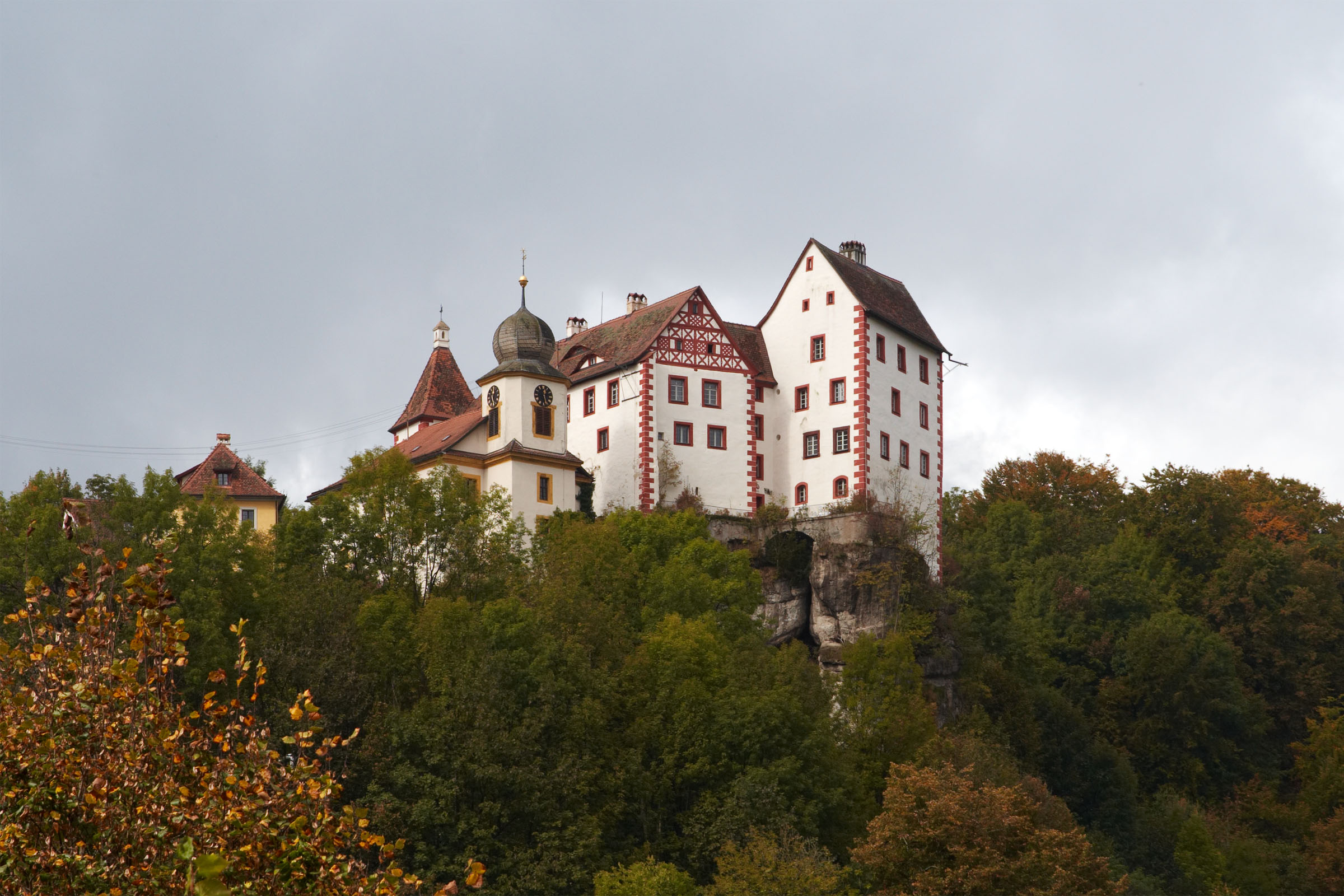
Egloffstein Castle

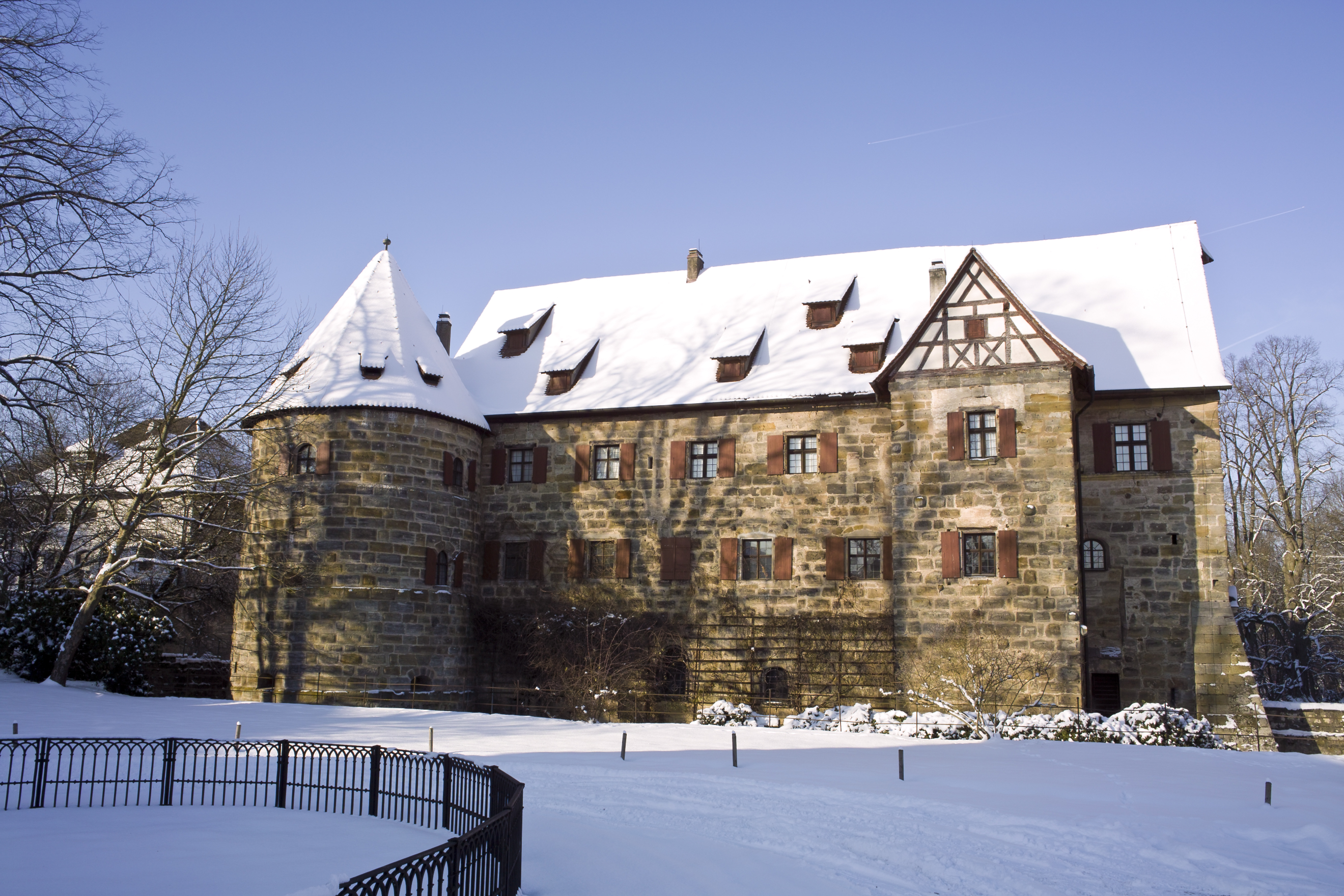
Kunreuth Castle

The Egloffsteins were a mighty, influential Franconian family of Imperial Knights with many branches. They belonged to the Knights' Cantons of Gebürg (Ritterkanton Gebürg) and Steigerwald (Ritterkanton Steigerwald), Gebürg being part of the old name for Franconian Switzerland.

In the 14th century, they not only had their own castles in Egloffstein, but also in Stolzenrode, Leienfels, Burggaillenreuth, Neuhaus an der Pegnitz, Lauterbach, Wolfsberg, Wadendorf, Neunkirchen am Brand, Löhlitz and Henfenfeld as well as a water castle in Kunreuth. The Egloffsteins used their own allodial estates to found the chaplaincy in Egloffstein.

They were related inter alia to the noble families of Lüchau and Rabensteiner zu Döhlau.

Family members engaged in numerous feuds with the Imperial City of Nuremberg.

=== Bavaria ===
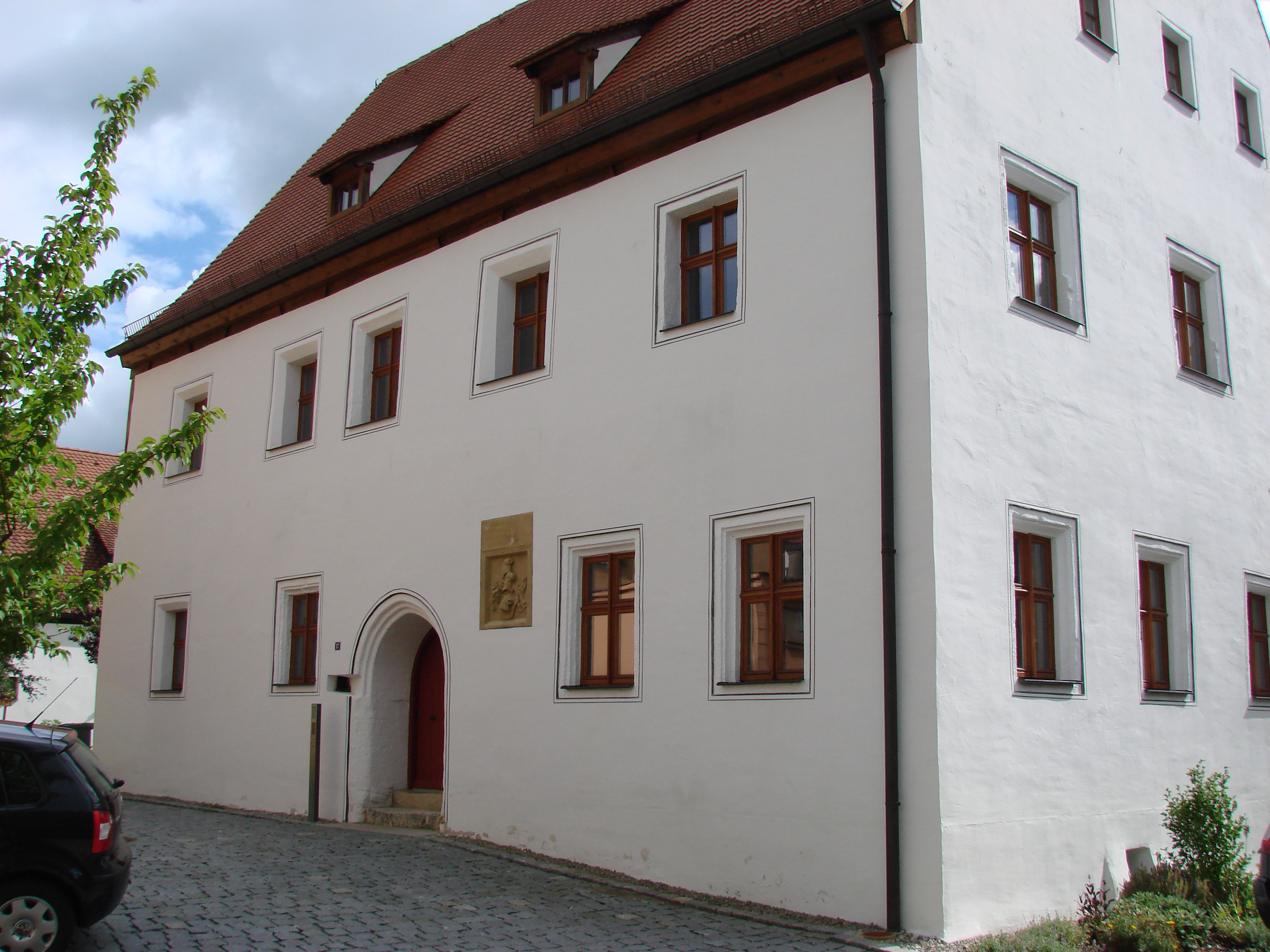
Egloffsteiner Palace in Sulzbach-Rosenberg – right, near the portal, a relief with the Egloffstein coat of arms

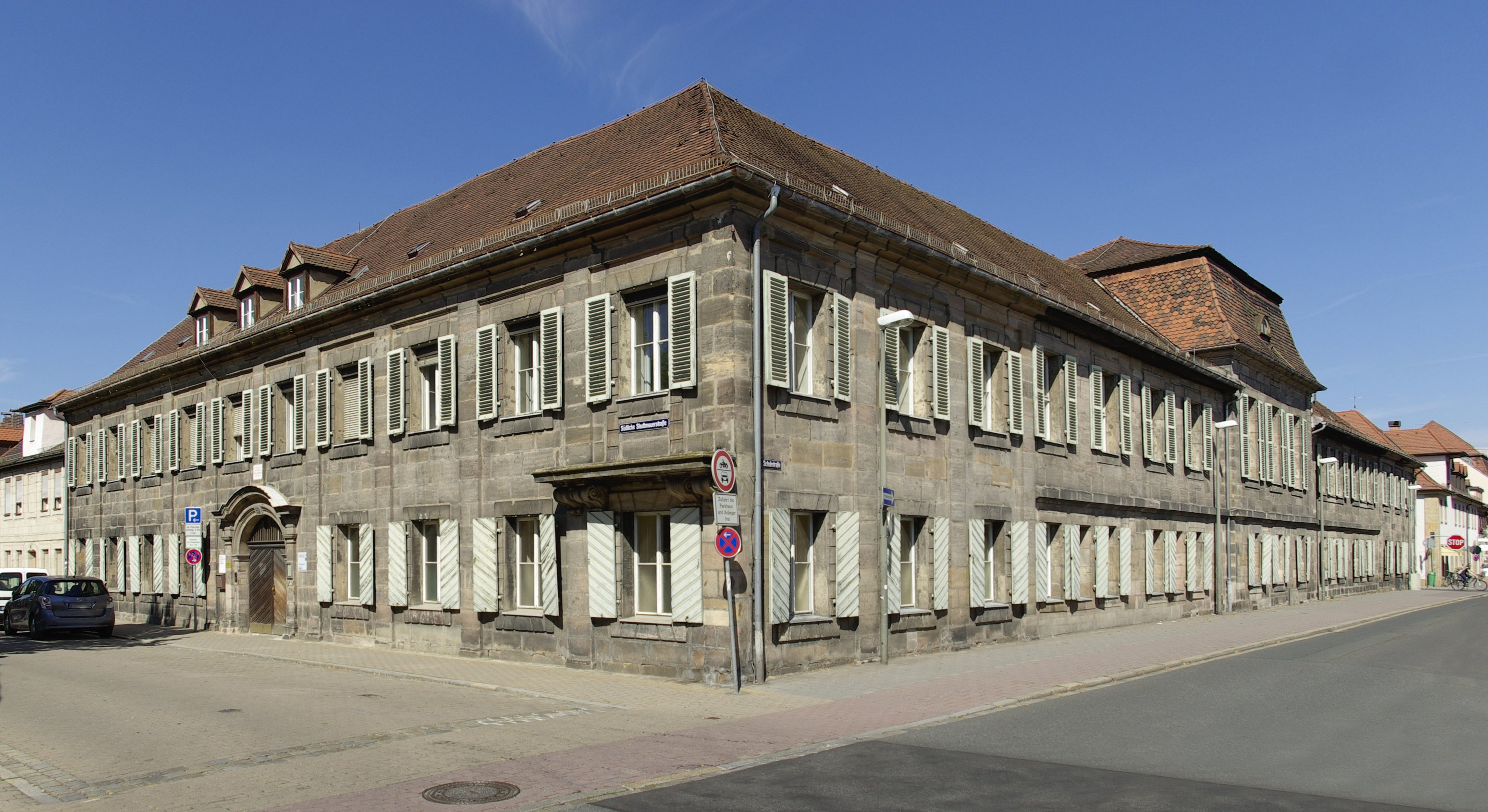
Egloffstein palaces in Erlangen

The Egloffsteins had wealthy possessions in Franconia; these included:

- pre 1180–today Egloffstein Castle
- 1348–today Kunreuth Castle
- 1369–1509 Winterstein Castle
- ????–1400/1422 the knight's estate of Ermreuth
- ????–1416 Renzenhof Manor near Röthenbach an der Pegnitz
- 1401–1410 Strahlenfels Castle near Simmelsdorf
- 1405–1530 Henfenfeld Castle (Pfinzingschloss)
- 1412–???? Steinhaus Manor in Dormitz
- 1415–1503 Hartenstein Castle
- 1416–1530 Altenstadt Castle
- 1447–1470 (ca.) Osternohe Castle near Schnaittach
- 1453–1510 (ca.) Artelshofen Manor
- 1470–???? Egloffstein Palace in present-day Sulzbach-Rosenberg
- 1718–1744 Egloffstein Palace in Erlangen, Frederickstraße 17
- 1744–1800/1830–1851 Seckendorff-Eggloffsteinsche Freihaus in Kornburg
- 1780–1802 Forth Manor near Eckental
- 1790–1819 Oberndorf Manor near Möhrendorf
- 1791–1814 Büg Manor near Eckental
- 1794–1808 Weigelshof Manor near Nuremberg

=== State of the Teutonic Order ===
The Egloffsteins had several estates in the State of the Teutonic Order, today Poland and the Russian exclave of Kaliningrad.

A village in Meistersfelde in present-day Poland was called Egloffstein (today: Główczyno) until 1945. Apparently Lagodzin (near Landsberg an der Warthe) also bore this name.

After the end of the Prussian War of the Cities, Deutschmeister, Conrad of Egloffstein, was given the town of Domnau as a fief and a reward for his military service. Conrad of Egloffstein built a new palace on an island in the river. The remains of the old castle were torn down in 1474.

Albert, Freiherr von und zu Egloffstein, had Arklitten Palace built in Arklitten between 1780 and 1782 in the Late Baroque style.

=== Arklitten ===
On 19 October 1786, Freiherr Albert Dietrich Gottfried von und zum Egloffstein, a Prussian major general and governor of East and West Prussia, and his brother, Otto Frederick Freiherr of Egloffstein, a Prussian major received the title of count, after the former had founded in 1783 the majorat of Arklitten in East Prussia. This title was confirmed on 8 May 1914 in the Kingdom of Bavaria in the comital class. Its estates included the fideicommissum of Arklitten, the county of Gerdauen, East Prussia, and, from 1889, the Upper Lusatian estates of Kromlau and Groß Düben.

Together with the line of free nobles, the counts of Egloffstein owned Schloss Kunreuth, the estates of Egloffstein, Schloss Schmölz and Schloss Theisenort. From the comital line come Counts Otto Dietrich, Albert Henry, Frederick-Eglolf, Albert and Frederick-Tassilo Rafael von und zu Egloffstein.

=== Family union ===
From 13 July 1358, a condominium (international law) foundation is mentioned in the records. This family union was re-established in 1505 by cathedral canon, Leonard of Egloffstein and became a registered society in 1911 as the Family Association of the Counts and Lords von und zu Egloffstein. A family day is held every six years in Kunreuth.

== Lords of Egloffstein and their lineage ==
- I (main) line

Progenitor: Charles Ludwig Ernest Franz of Egloffstein (1734–1773)

- 1st branch;

Progenitor: Christian of Egloffstein (1764–1834)
1st sub-branch
2nd sub-branch: male line died out in when the sons of William Freiherr von und zu Egloffstein (1853–1929) and Elisabeth, née Freiin von Rotenhan (born 2 May 1865 in Rentweinsdorf; died 29 October 1948 in Eisenach) died during the Second World War
3rd sub-branch: male line died out with Camil von und zu Egloffstein (born 18 December 1850 in Mühlhausen; died 5 December 1919 in Cincinnati, Ohio, USA)

- 2nd branch

Progenitor: Frederick Gottfried of Egloffstein (1769–1848)
1st sub-branch
Progenitor: Leonhard Berthold William Julius Freiherr von und zu Egloffstein (1842–1904)
2nd sub-branch
Progenitor: Paul Frederick August Freiherr von und zu Egloffstein (1856–1903)

- II (secondary) line

Progenitor: Ernest of Egloffstein (1748–1830)

- 1st branch:

Progenitor: William of Egloffstein (1803–1866)
male line died out with Camil Freiherr von und zu Egloffstein (born 28 July 1845 in Nuremberg; died 23 July 1924 in Kalksburg near Vienna).

- 2nd branch:

Progenitor: Camille Ernest Charles William Freiherr von und zu Egloffstein (1805–1868)

from this branch:

Maurice James Albert Maria Freiherr von und zu Egloffstein (see above)

- 3rd branch:

Progenitor: Charles of Egloffstein (born 24 January 1869 in Wunderburg; died 18 March 1929 in Bamberg), this 3rd branch died out with him.

- 4th branch:

Progenitor: Eugene, Freiherr von und zu Egloffstein (born 25 July 1863 in Bamberg) gave up his name and title in 1900 and wandered away.

- 5th branch:

Progenitor: Frederick Freiherr von und zu Egloffstein (born 18 May 1824 in Egloffstein; died 13 February 1885 in Dresden)

male line died out with Leonard Clarence Freiherr von und zu Egloffstein (born 9 May 1889; died 17 October 1966)

== Coat of arms ==
The family coat of arms (Stammwappen) with its right-facing, black bear's head with a red tongue on a silver shield is recorded since 1317. On the helmet with its black and silver mantle to the right and black and gold mantle to the left, the bear's head is seen again.

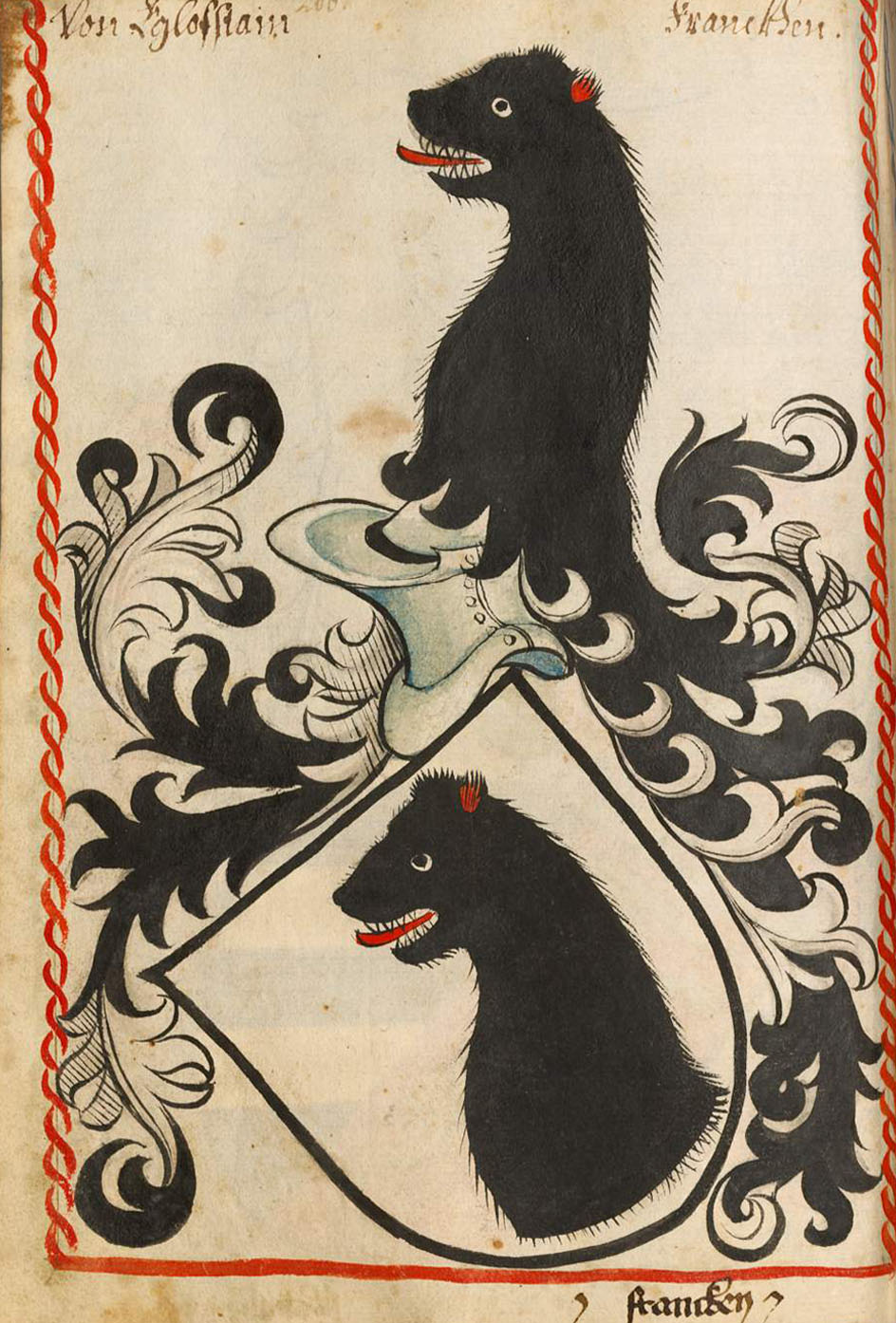
Coat of arms from Scheibler’s Armorial 1450–1480

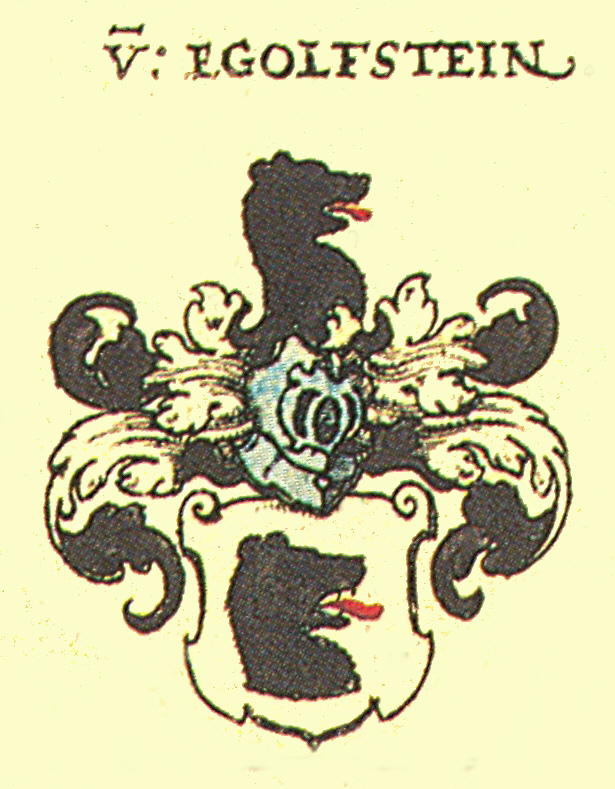
Coat of arms from Siebmacher's Armorial of 1605

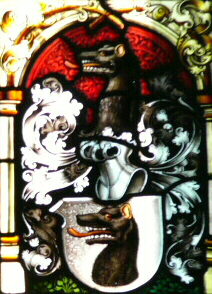
Painting on a church window, 1916

The heraldic device of the Egloffstein bears is recalled on the ruins of the Egloffstein's Bärnfels Castle and Bärenthal Mill on the River Trubach. The coat of arms of Egloffstein with reversed tinctures recalls this family.

Coat of arms of the municipality of Kunreuth

== Notable family members ==
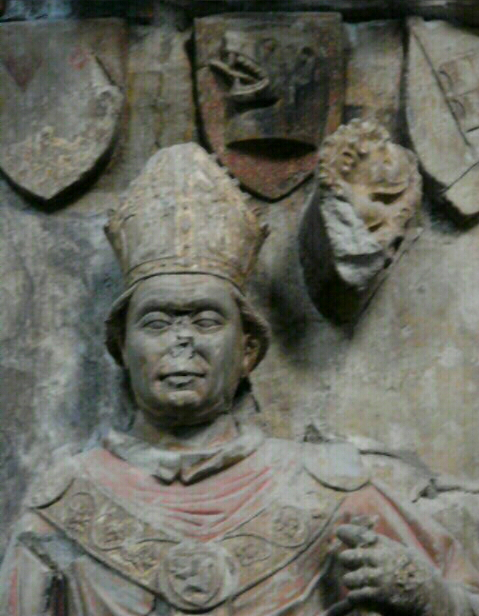
John I of Egloffstein, Prince-Bishop of Würzburg (1400–1411)

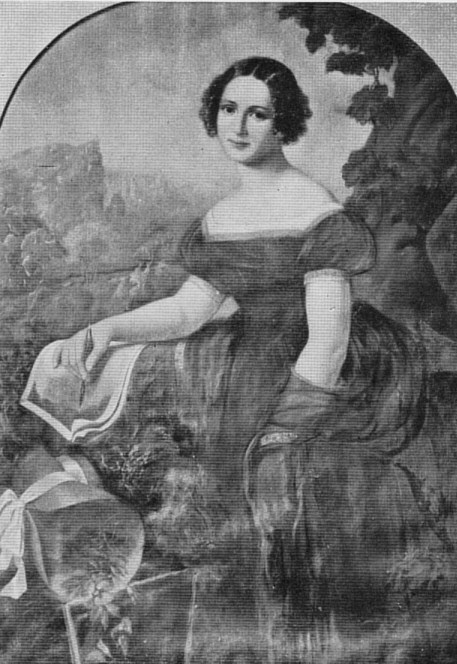
Julia, Countess of Egloffstein (1792–1869), artist (self-portrait)

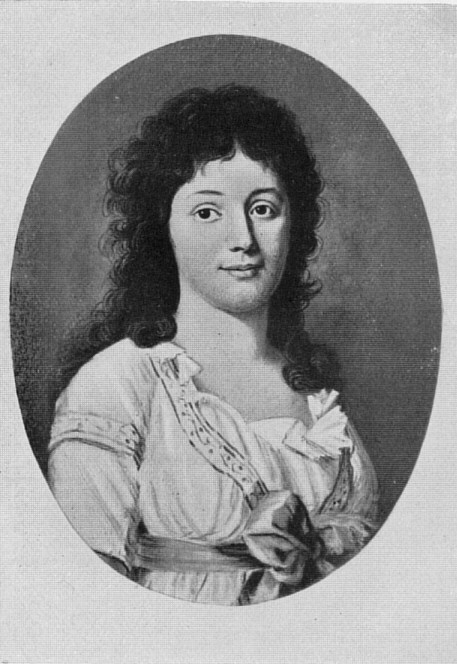
Henrietta, Countess of Egloffstein (1773–1864), writer

- Harthum of Egloffstein, commander of Nuremberg (Komtur zu Nürnberg) and Henry of Egloffstein (Franconia) as Teutonic Knights
- Leopold II of Egloffstein, Bishop of Bamberg (1336–1343)
- Konrad of Egloffstein, Deutschmeister of the Teutonic Order (1396–1416), brother of the Bishop of Würzburg John I of Egloffstein
- John I of Egloffstein, Prince-Bishop of Würzburg (1400–1411) and founder of Würzburg University
- Sigmund of Egloffstein (1425–1479), Imperial Sheriff (Reichsschultheiß) of Nuremberg
- Kunigunde of Egloffstein (1456–1479), Abbess of Obermünster
- Albert Dietrich Godfrey, Count von und zu Egloffstein (1720–1791), Prussian governor general of East and West Prussia
- Leopold III Count von und zu Egloffstein (1766–1830), Prussian senior cup-bearer and last Ritterhauptmann of the Canton of Steigerwald in the Franconian Imperial Knights Brotherhood
- August Charles von und zu Egloffstein (1771–1834), Saxe-Weimar major general * Henrietta, Countess of Egloffstein (1773–1864), writer
- Caroline von und zu Egloffstein (1789-1868), lady of court, writer and abbess
- Julia, Countess of Egloffstein (1792–1869), lady of court and artist
- Julius von und zu Egloffstein (1803–1861), chamberlain in the Grand Duchy of Oldenburg, Oldenburg lieutenant general and adjutant general
- Leonard of Egloffstein (1815–1900), Prussian major general
- Frederick von und zu Egloffstein (General) (1824–1885), American general
- Frederick William Freiherr of Egloffstein (1824–1898) was a topographic draughtsman, map artist and copper engraver
- Gustav von und zu Egloffstein (1831–1916), Prussian major general
- Leonard von und zu Egloffstein (1842–1904), Prussian major general
- William von und zu Egloffstein (1853–1929), Prussian General of Infantry
- Moritz Freiherr von und zu Egloffstein (1861–1942), Bavarian major general and commander in the Cavalry Division in the First World War
- Günter von und zu Egloffstein (1896–1938), NSKK Oberführer, 1933–1938 President of DDAC (see ADAC)
- Otto Dietrich von und zu Egloffstein (born 27 July 1940 in Gerdauen/East Prussia)
- Albrecht Heinrich von und zu Egloffstein (born 13 June 1946 in Gronau), provincial local historian for Upper Franconia, author
- Albrecht von und zu Egloffstein (born 5 November 1939 in Bamberg), brigadier general, owner of Egloffstein Castle
- Johannes Graf von und zu Egloffstein (born 14 January 1994 in Roth)

== Varia ==
Ludwig Robert Oerthel was born in 1894 in Dresden. In the 192 he operated as a con man under the name of Freiherr of Egloffstein:

- Freiherr of Egloffstein. novel from the series Außenseiter der Gesellschaft. Die Verbrechen der Gegenwart in the 1920s.

== Literature ==
- Genealogisches Handbuch des Adels. Vol. 61, 1975, Adelslexikon.
- Der in Bayern immatrikulierte Adel. Vol. 6 (1957), pp. 111, 195.
- Der in Bayern immatrikulierte Adel. Vol. 11 (1975), pp. 103, 196.
- Genealogisches Handbuch des Adels. Adelslexikon, Vol. III/1975.
- Gustav Voigt: Der Adel am Obermain. in: Die Plassenburg. Schriften für Heimatforschung und Kulturpflege in Ostfranken. Vol. 28, Kulmbach, 1969.
- Gothaisches genealogisches Taschenbuch der freiherrlichen Häuser auf das Jahr 1857. Siebenter Jahrgang, pp. 153ff.
