= Bärnfels Castle =

Castle in Germany

- Bärnfels
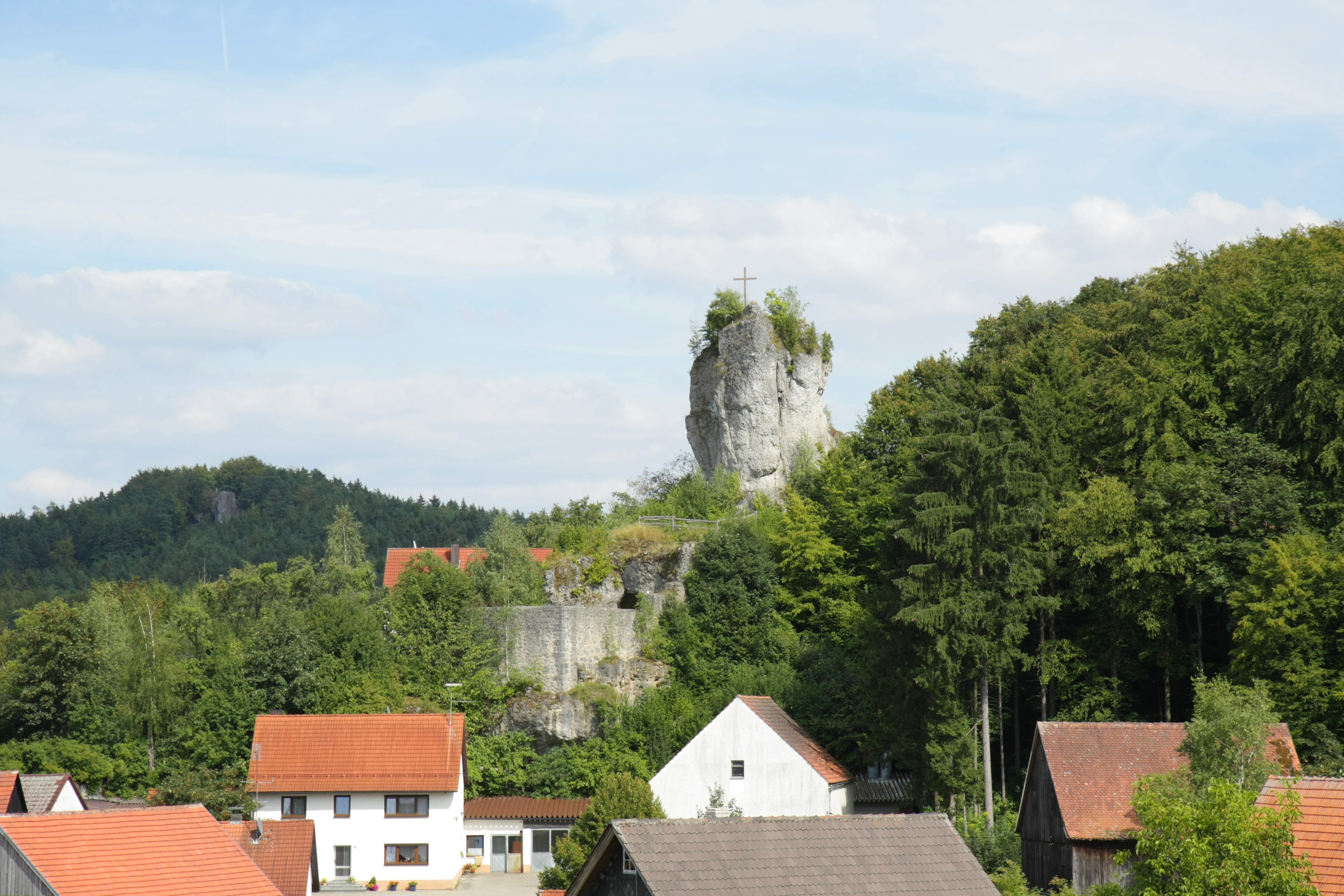
- Bärnfels Castle with its bergfried atop the rock pinnacle (August 2009)

Site information
- Type: hill castle, spur castle
- Code: DE-BY
- Condition: restored ruins

Location
- Coordinates: 49°42′52″N 11°20′37″E
- Height: 515 m above sea level (NN)

Site history
- Built: c. 1330
- Materials: rubble stone walls

Garrison information
- Occupants: Ministeriales

The ruins of Bärnfels Castle (German: Burg Bärnfels) are the remains of a late mediaeval aristocratic castle on the southern edge of the village of Bärnfels in the municipality of Obertrubach in the Upper Franconian county of Forchheim in Bavaria. The ruins of the spur castle are freely accessible.

== Location ==
The ruins of the castle stand on craggy hill spur at a height of 515 m above sea level (NN), the so-called Bergschmidtsknock, above the eponymous village in the Franconian Switzerland-Veldenstein Forest Nature Park, about 2.2 kilometres north of the church at Obertrubach.

The ruins may be reached from the village of Bärnfels by climbing up a number of steps.

In the vicinity are several other castles. Towards the east are the ruins of Leienfels Castle, to the southeast is the site of Leupoldstein Castle and to the south is another burgstall in Obertrubach. To the north is the still inhabited castle of Gößweinstein.

== History ==
Coat of arms of the lords of Egloffstein

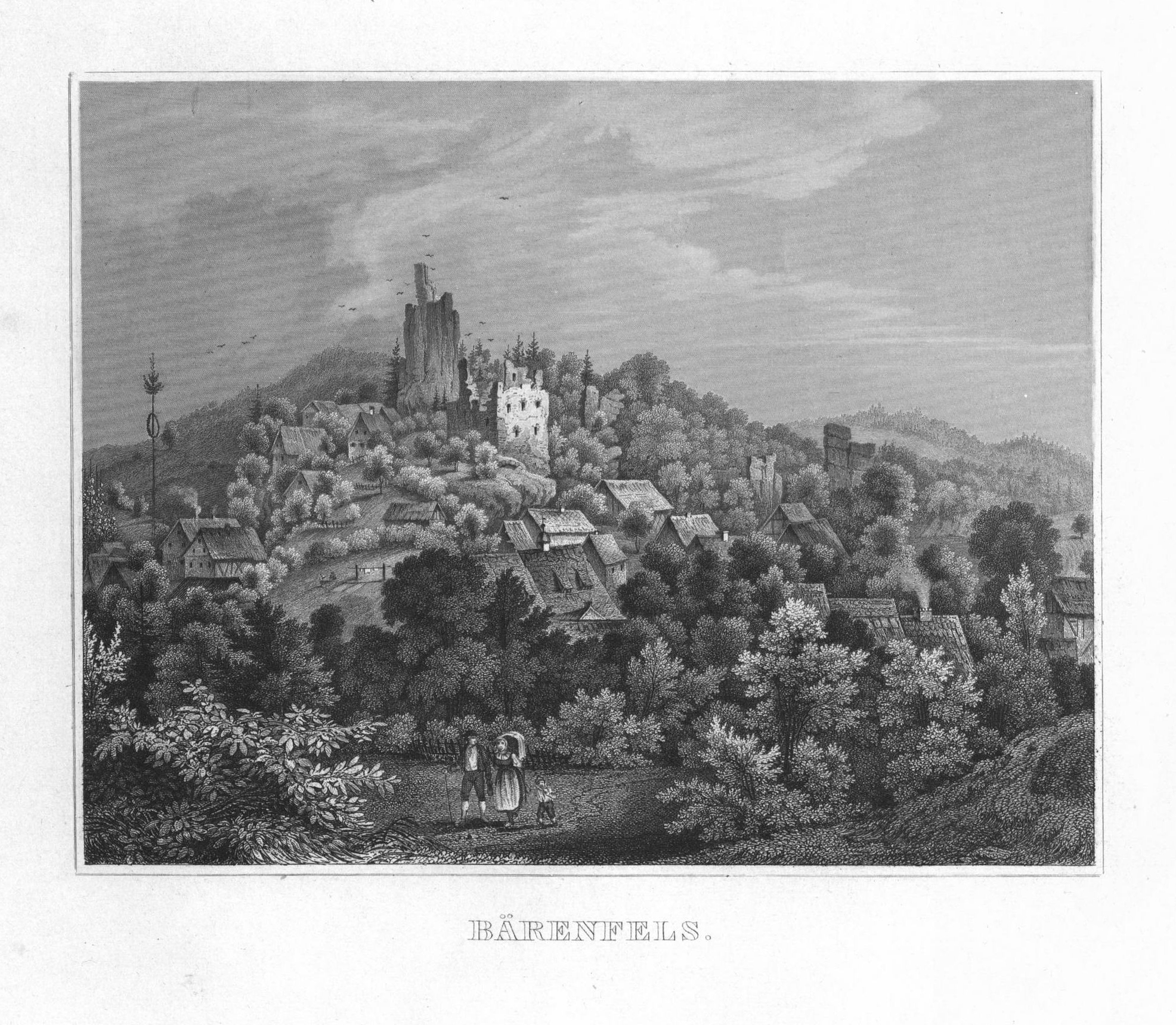
Bärnfels, steel engraving (1858)

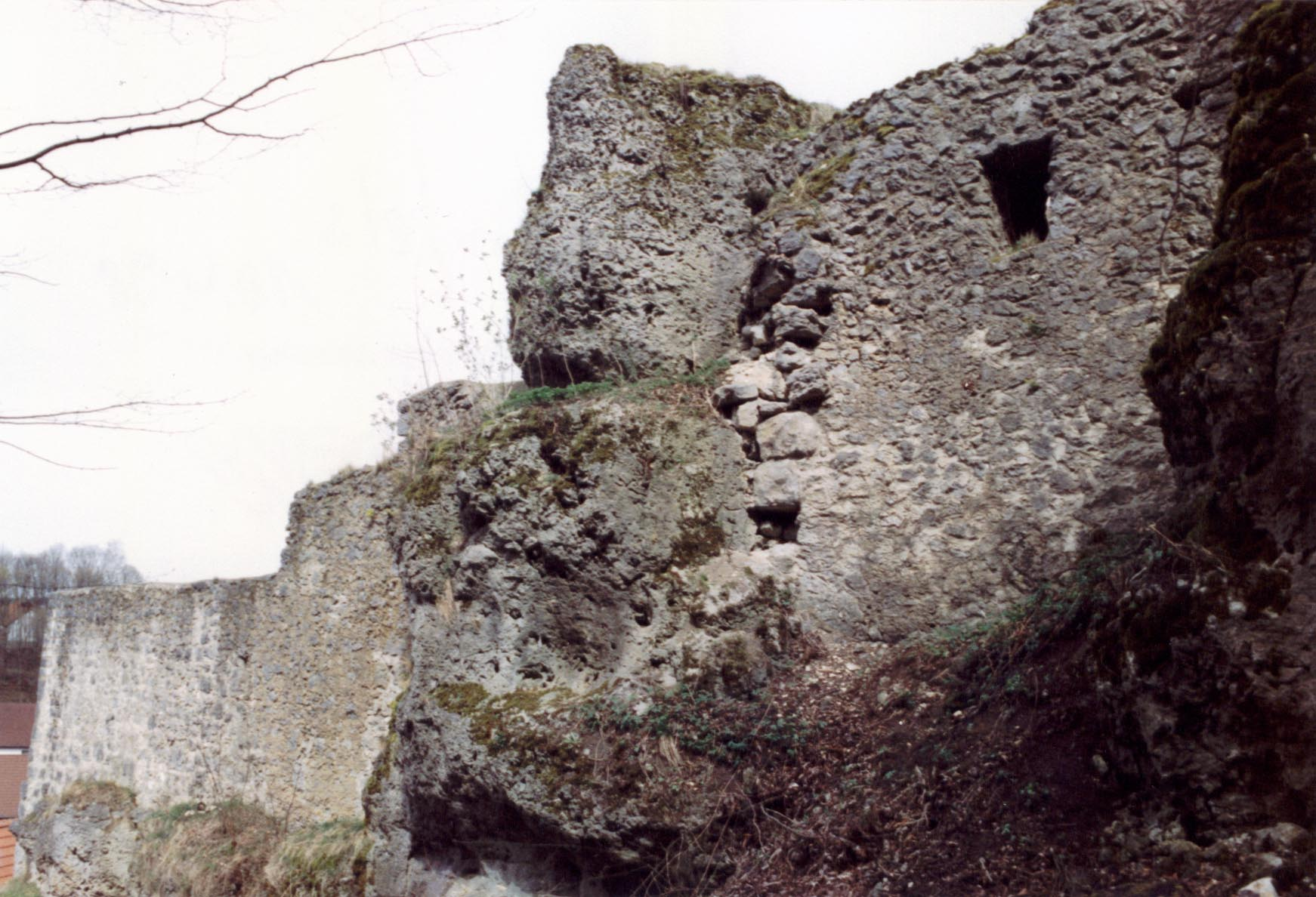
Bärnfels castle ruins (February 2008)

The first record of the castle is dated 2 August 1389, when its occupants, Conrad Hans and Ulrich of Egloffstein zu Bärenfels had to concede their outer bailey, the so-called Lower Fortress (niedere Veste), as a fief following a feud with the Landgraves of Leuchtenberg. The castle had, however, been built much earlier, probably in 1330 by Siboto I of Egloffstein, progenitor of the Bärenfels line of this family.

In 1483 the fief went to the Gaillenreuth line of the Egloffsteins, who did not hold it for long however, because in 1495 the last enfeoffment was granted by the Leuchtenberg landgrave.

After the castle had been razed in the Peasants' War in 1525 by Egloffstein's subjects, it was never completely repaired again.

In 1580 the Barony of Bärnfels together with its castle ruins was sold to the Bishopric of Bamberg and was seized by the Bavarian state in 1802 as part of the secularisation in Bavaria.

Because large parts of the castle were in danger of collapse, it was demolished in the 19th and 20th centuries. In 1877 Nuremberg chemist, Kleemann, bought the site and had the few surviving remains restored.

After a further renovation was carried out in 1969 by the municipality of Bärnfels it was able to be made accessible to visitors again.

Today the castle ruins of Bärnfels are once more owned by the Egloffstein family, whose ancestor probably once built the castle.

== Literature ==
- Friedrich-Wilhelm Krahe: Burgen des deutschen Mittelalters. Grundriss-Lexikon. Flechsig Verlag, Würzburg, 2000, ISBN 3-88189-360-1, p. 91.
- Ursula Pfistermeister: Wehrhaftes Franken. Band 3: Burgen, Kirchenburgen, Stadtmauern um Bamberg, Bayreuth und Coburg. Verlag Hans Carl, Nuremberg, 2002, ISBN 3-418-00387-7, pp. 24–25.
- Walter Heinz: Ehemalige Adelssitze im Trubachtal. Verlag Palm und Enke, Erlangen and Jena, 1996, ISBN 3-7896-0554-9, pp. 40–57.
- Gustav Voit, Brigitte Kaulich, Walter Rüfer: Vom Land im Gebirg zur Fränkischen Schweiz - Eine Landschaft wird entdeckt. (Schriftenreihe des Fränkische-Schweiz-Vereins, Vol. 8) Verlag Palm und Enke, Erlangen, 1992, ISBN 3-7896-0511-5, pp. 96–99.
- Gustav Voit, Walter Rüfer: Eine Burgenreise durch die Fränkische Schweiz. Verlag Palm und Enke, Erlangen, 1991, ISBN 3-7896-0064-4, pp. 28–32.
- Björn-Uwe Abels, Joachim Zeune, et al.: Führer zu archäologischen Denkmälern in Deutschland. Band 20: Fränkische Schweiz. Konrad Theiss Verlag, Stuttgart, 1990, ISBN 3-8062-0586-8, pp. 138.
- Hellmut Kunstmann: Die Burgen der östlichen Fränkischen Schweiz. Schöningh Verlag, Würzburg, 1965, pp. 404–411.
- Toni Eckert, Susanne Fischer, Renate Freitag, Rainer Hofmann, Walter Tausendpfund: Die Burgen der Fränkischen Schweiz. Gürtler Druck, Forchheim o.J., ISBN 3-9803276-5-5, pp. 24–27.
