= Kunreuth =

- Municipality
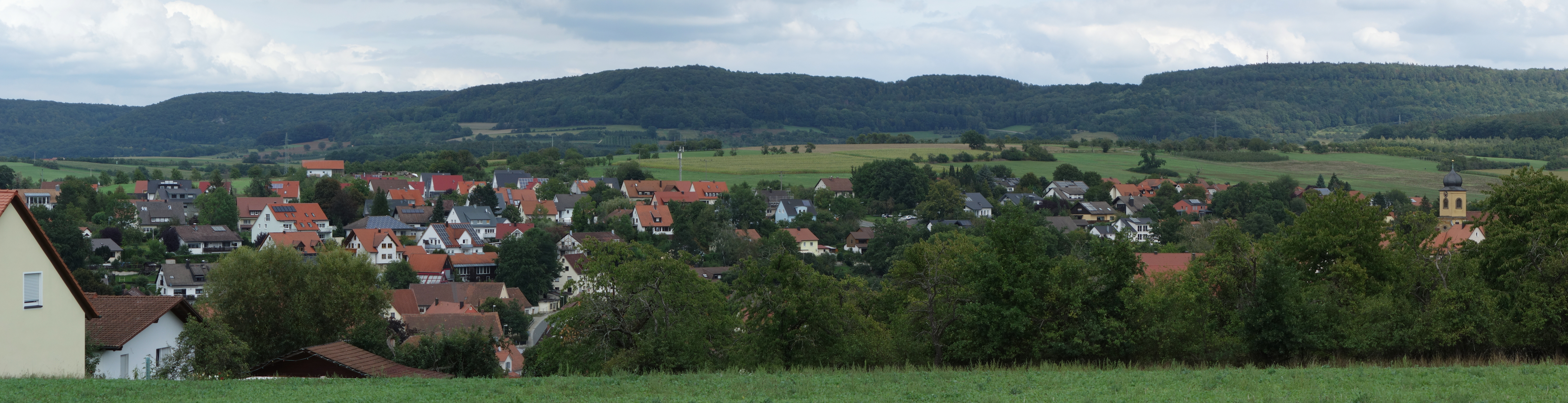

- Coat of arms

- Location of Kunreuth within Forchheim district
- Interactive map of Kunreuth
- Location within Germany Location within Bavaria
- Coordinates: 49°41′N 11°09′E
- Country: Germany
- State: Bavaria
- Admin. region: Oberfranken
- District: Forchheim
- Municipal assoc.: Gosberg

Government
  - Mayor (2020–26): Ernst Strian

Area
  - Total: 9.79 km^{2} (3.78 sq mi)
- Elevation: 313 m (1,027 ft)

Population (2025-12-31)
  - Total: 1,404
  - Density: 143/km^{2} (371/sq mi)
- Time zone: UTC+01:00 (CET)
  - Summer (DST): UTC+02:00 (CEST)
- Postal codes: 91358
- Dialling codes: 09199
- Vehicle registration: FO
- Website: www.gemeinde-kunreuth.de

Kunreuth is a municipality in the district of Forchheim in Bavaria in Germany.

The town is the location of Schloss Kunreuth. Since the 14th century the castle has belonged to the family of the Counts and Barons von Egloffstein who have also owned Egloffstein Castle since the 12th century.

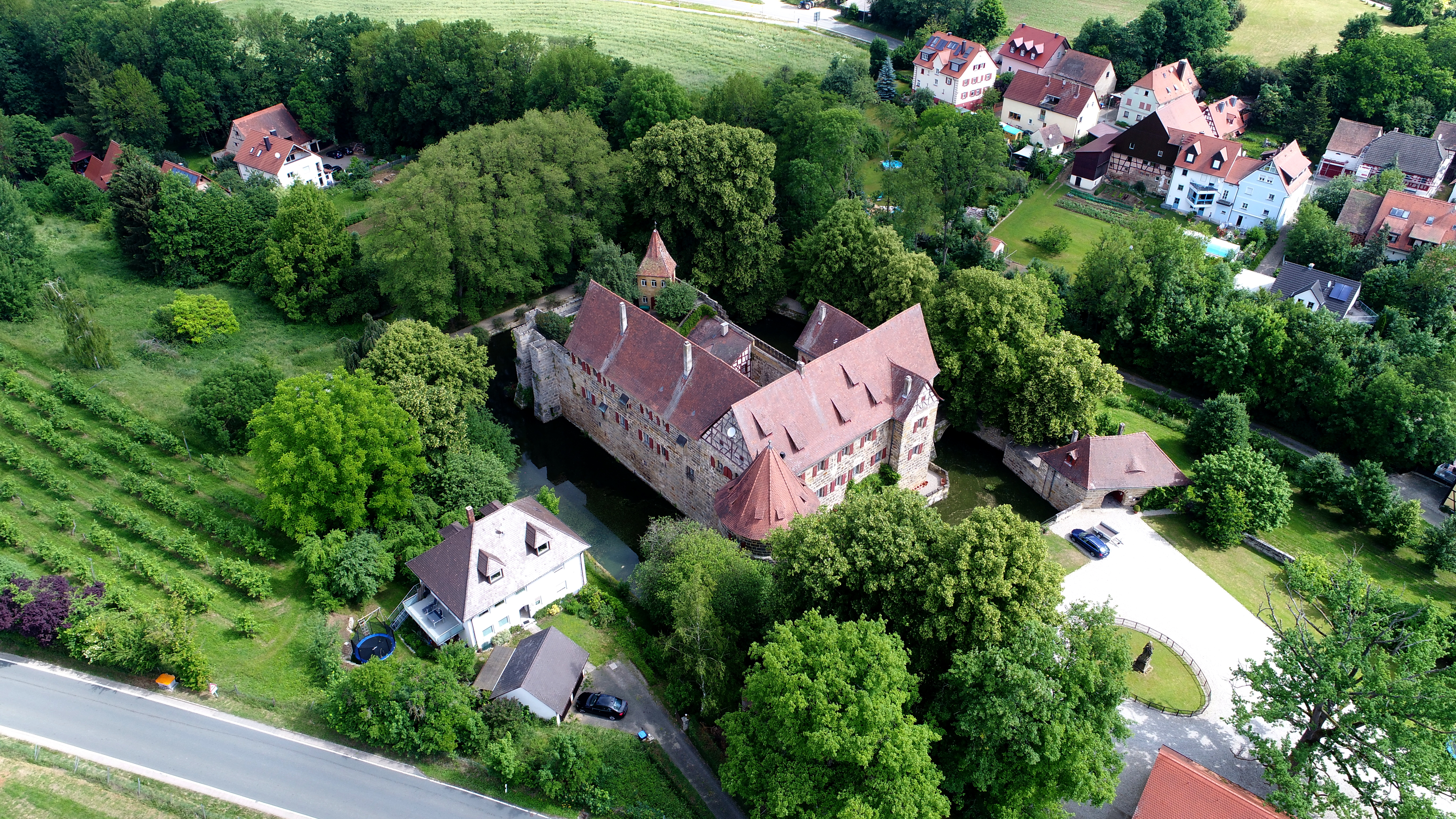
Kunreuth Castle
