= Schloss Kunreuth =

Castle in Germany

Coordinates: 49°40′59″N 11°08′26″E

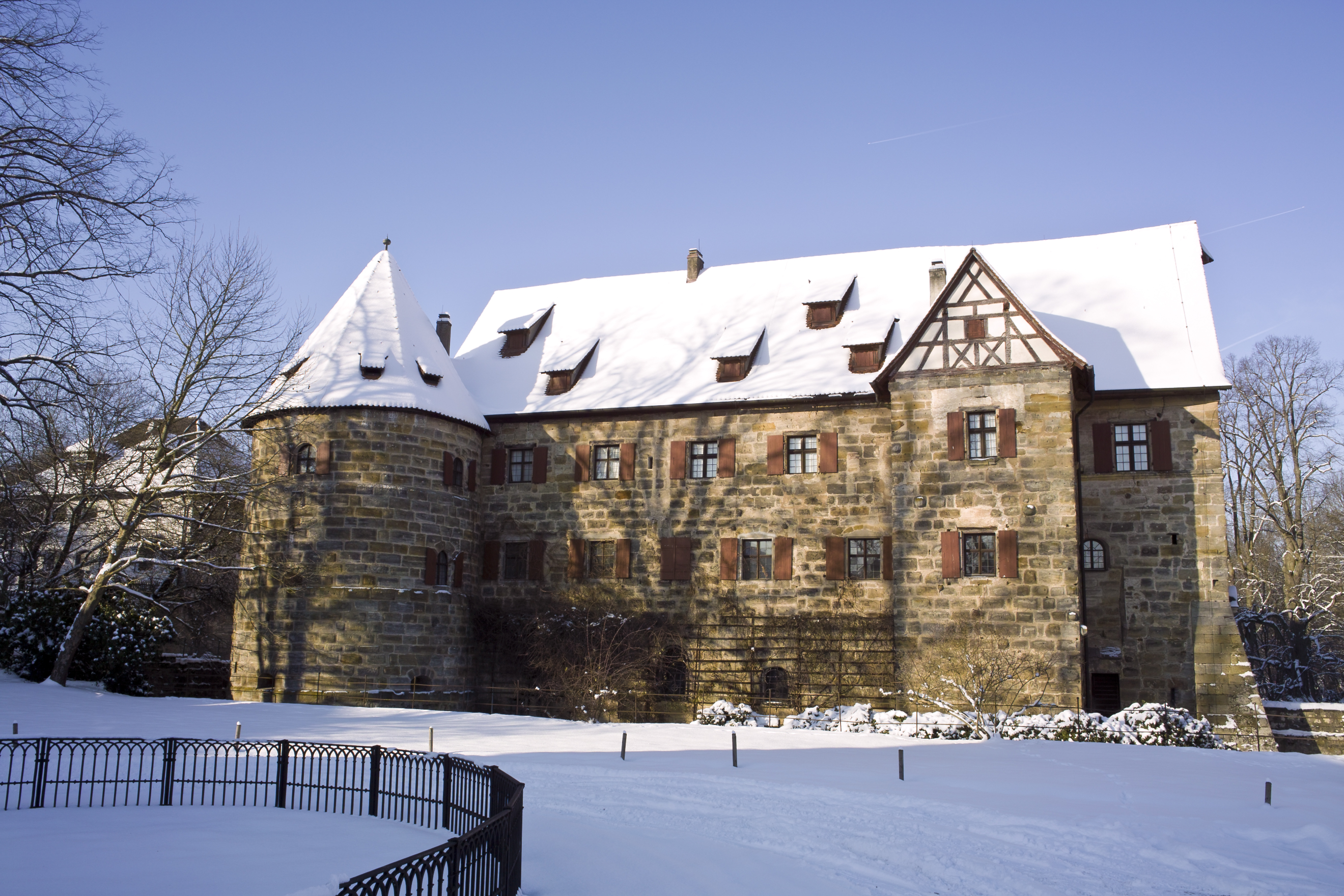
Schloss Kunreuth, south wing, December 2010

Schloss Kunreuth is situated on the northwestern edge of the eponymous village of Kunreuth which is part of the collective municipality of Gosberg in the county of Forchheim, in the province of Upper Franconia in the south German state of Bavaria.

== History ==
The village of Kunreuth had probably been mentioned in the founding document (Gründungsbuch) of the church of St. James at Bamberg which dates to 1109. Lords of Kunreuth are first recorded in 1308. What is unclear is whether there was already a castle in existence at that time.

The first record of a castle dates to 1409. At that time, the castle was a fief of the Bishopric of Bamberg, owned by the lords of Egloffstein.

In 1420 the castle was conquered and plundered during a feud between Margrave Frederick I of Brandenburg and Duke Louis VII of Bavaria-Ingolstadt.

In 1525, during the Peasants' War the castle was destroyed. It was immediately rebuilt by the lords of Egloffstein. In 1553 the castle was wrecked again: during the Second Margrave War by Margrave Albert Alcibiades. Despite the promise of free passage, the troops of the garrison were hanged on the trees around the castle.

From 1558 the castle, now a Ganerbenburg of the House of Egloffstein, was rebuilt as a schloss, whilst largely retaining its military character.

During the Thirty Years' War the schloss suffered severe damage during its frequent use for billeting soldiers.

This damage was repaired over time. The schloss is still owned by the counts and freiherren "von und zu Egloffstein". It was used to house their family archives, which now accommodates apartments as well as bureaus.

== Description ==
The former water castle – some of the moats were laid dry in 1827 – has a rectangular plan. It consists primarily of a west and a south wing. The south wing probably houses the oldest parts of the castle, which go back to the 14th century. The west wing was given its present appearance mainly in the period from 1611 to 1613. The gateway on the east side of the schloss was built in 1624. In 1746 the drawbridge was replaced by a stone bridge. On the north side is a wall with buttresses. Until its destruction in the Second Margrave War the so-called rear cabinet (Kemenate) was located here.

In the forecourt of the schloss is a monument to the first Count of Egloffstein, Count Albert Dietrich Godfrey of Egloffstein.

== Gallery ==
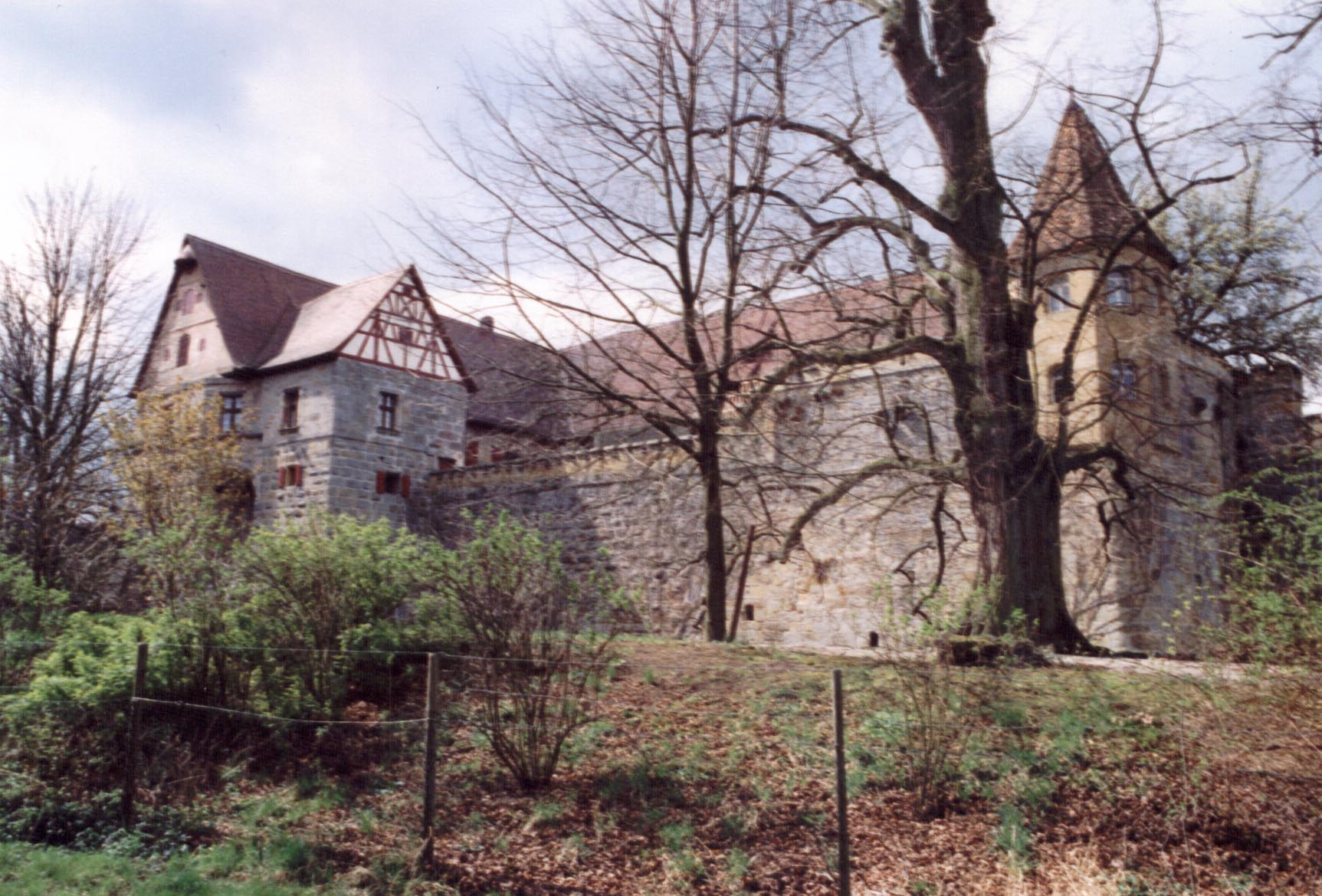
East side (1998)

Forecourt and south wing (2020)

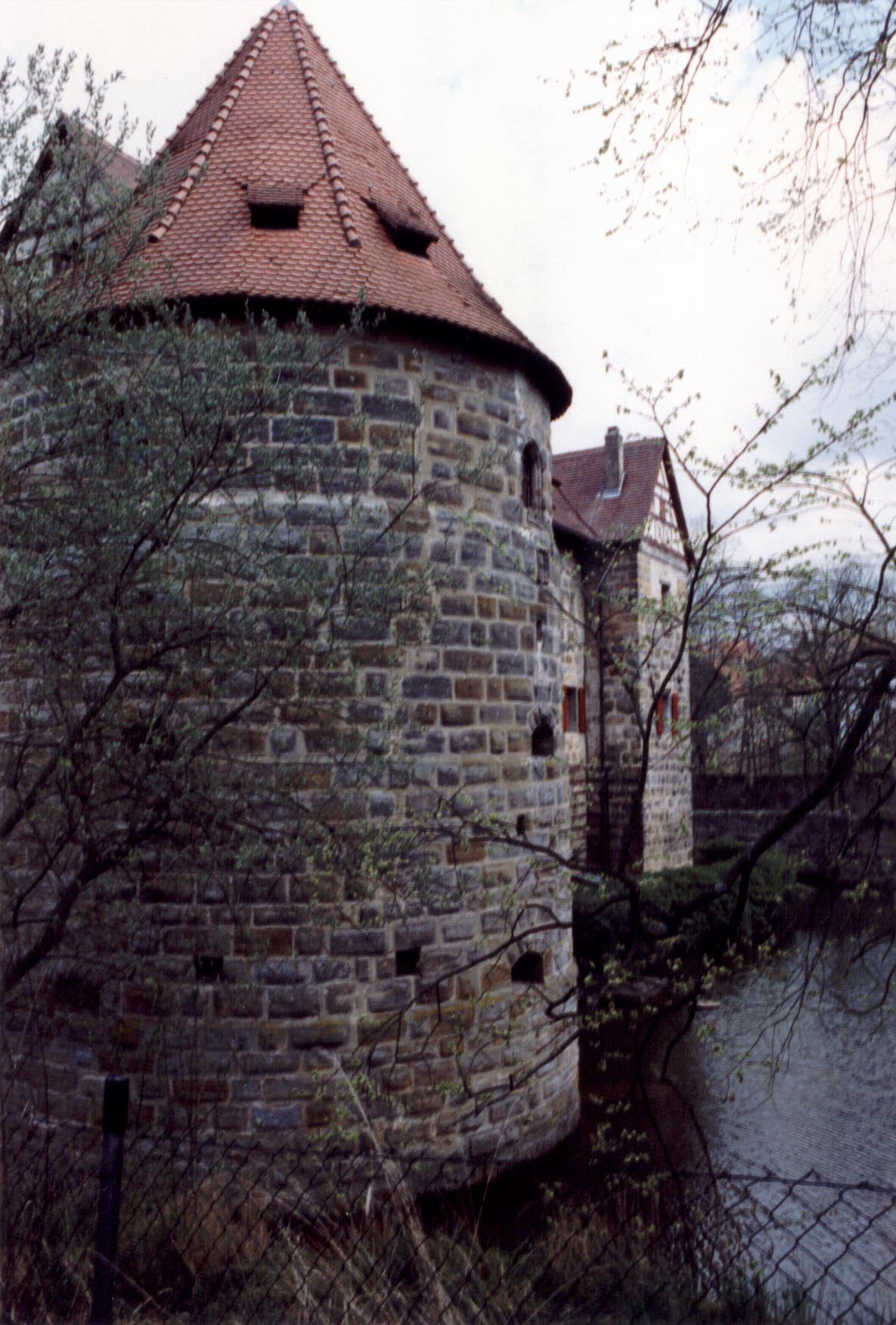
Round tower at the southwest corner (1998)

== Literature ==
- Kai Kellermann: Herrschaftliche Gärten in der Fränkischen Schweiz - Eine Spurensuche. Verlag Palm & Enke, Erlangen/ Jena, 2008, ISBN 978-3-7896-0683-0, pp. 130–137.
- Joachim Zeune: Kunreuth, Lkr. Forchheim: Schloss. In: Rainer Hofmann (Bearb.): Führer zu archäologischen Denkmälern in Deutschland. Vol. 20: Fränkische Schweiz. Konrad Theiss Verlag, Stuttgart, 1990, ISBN 3-8062-0586-8, pp. 195–196.
- Hellmut Kunstmann: Die Burgen der südwestlichen Fränkischen Schweiz. 2. Auflage. Kommissionsverlag Degener & Co, Neustadt an der Aisch, 1990, pp. 177–189.
- Toni Eckert, Susanne Fischer, Renate Freitag, Rainer Hofmann, Walter Tausendpfund: Die Burgen der Fränkischen Schweiz – Ein Kulturführer. Gürtler Druck, Forchheim, 1997, ISBN 3-9803276-5-5, pp. 88–92.
- Ursula Pfistermeister: Wehrhaftes Franken. Vol. 3: Burgen, Kirchenburgen, Stadtmauern um Bamberg, Bayreuth und Coburg. Verlag Hans Carl, Nuremberg, 2002, ISBN 3-418-00387-7, pp. 80–81.
- Hans-Michael Körner, Alois Schmid: Handbuch der historischen Stätten Deutschlands. Vol. 7/2: Bayern 2 (Franken). 4th edn. Alfred Kröner Verlag, Stuttgart, 2006, ISBN 3-520-32501-2, pp. 291–292.
- Albrecht von und zu Egloffstein: Burgen und Schlösser in Oberfranken: Ein Handbuch von Albrecht Graf von und zu Egloffstein. 1st edn. Verlag Weidlich, Frankfurt am Main, 1972, ISBN 3-426-04406-4, pp. 213–225.
