= Leienfels Castle =

Castle in Germany

- Pottenstein-Leienfels
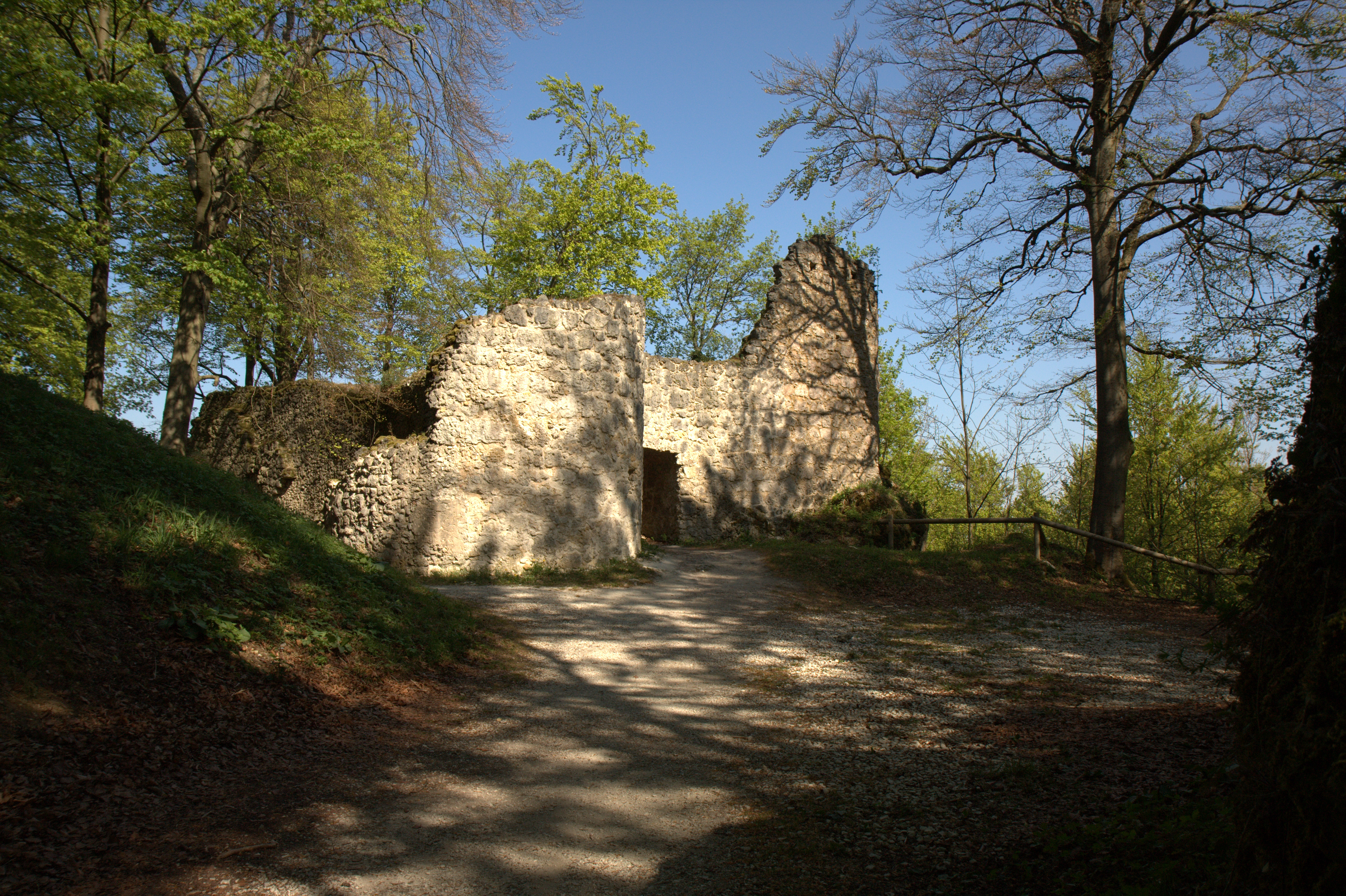
- Ruins of Leienfels Castle – view of the inner bailey with its entranceway and flanking round tower (April 2011)

Site information
- Type: hill castle, spur castle
- Code: DE-BY
- Condition: restored ruins

Location
- Coordinates: 49°42′34″N 11°22′11″E
- Height: 590 m above sea level (NN)

Site history
- Built: c. 1300
- Materials: rubble stone walls

Garrison information
- Occupants: ministeriales

Leienfels Castle (German: Burgruine Leienfels) was a late medieval aristocratic castle, immediately northwest of the eponymous village of Leienfels in the region of Franconian Switzerland in Germany. The village belongs to the borough of Pottenstein in the Upper Franconian county of Bayreuth in Bavaria.

The ruins of the hill castle are freely accessible and act as a viewing point.

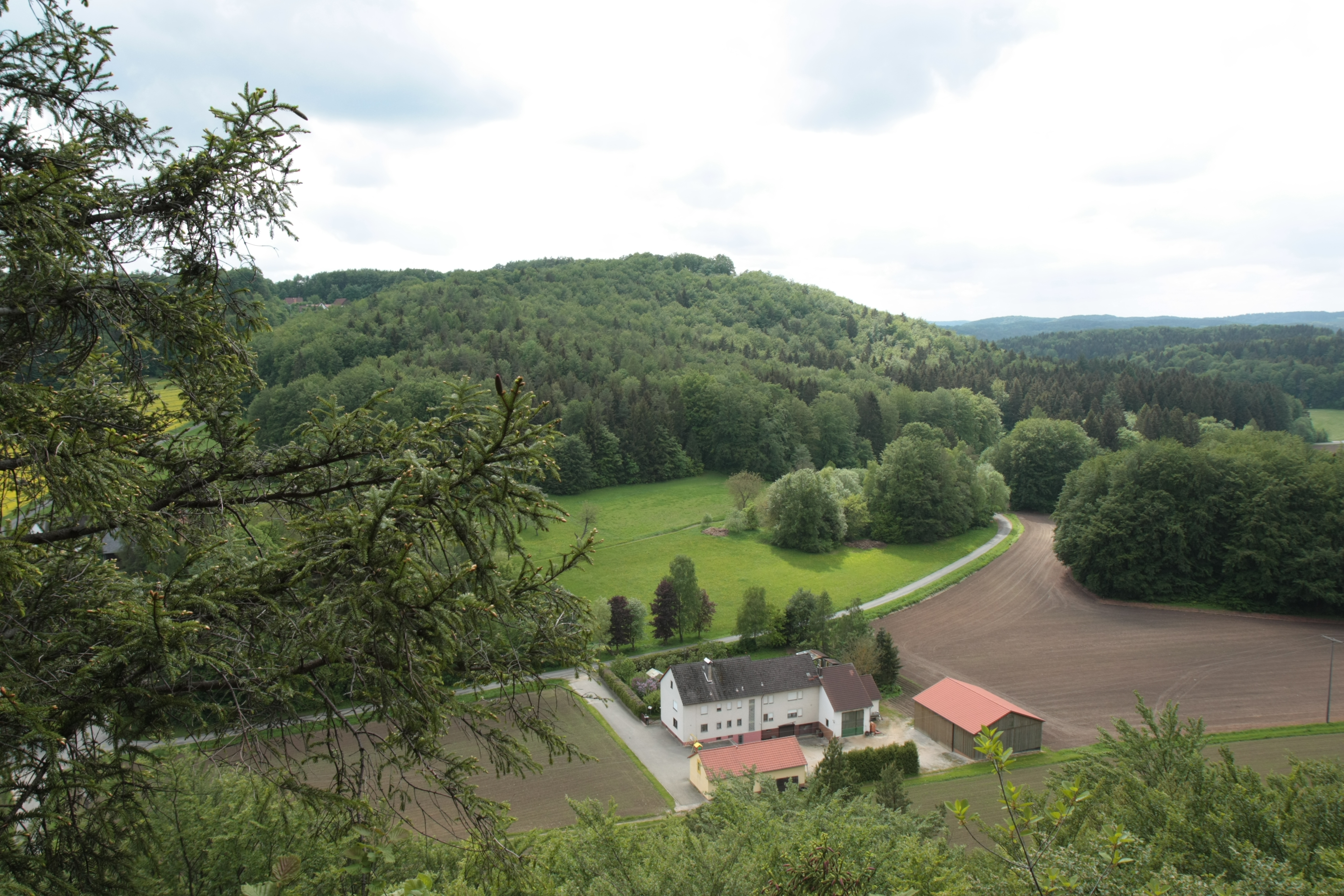
The Leienfelser Schlossberg with the ruins above the village of Graisch seen from the NE from the nearby site of Leuenstein Castle (May 2009)

== Location ==
The ruins lie within the Franconian Switzerland-Veldenstein Forest Nature Park on the 590-metre-high hill of Leienfelser Schlossberg immediately next to the village of Leienfels, about 4.6 kilometres northwest of the church at Betzenstein.

The castle may be reached from the village of Leienfels by heading in a northwesterly direction. The site of the castle begins at the edge of the village.

In the vicinity, towards the west, lie the ruins of Bärnfels Castle, to the north, on the Bleistein near Graisch, is the site of Leuenstein Castle. To the southeast is the site of Leupoldstein Castle and, to the southwest, in the valley of the Trubach, were other castles, of which ruins or foundations (Burgställe) still exist.

== History of the castle ==
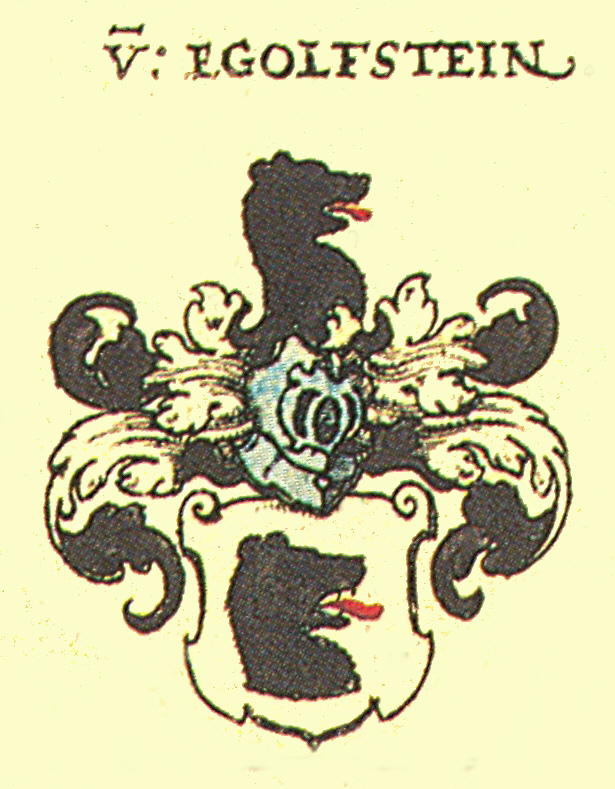
Coat of arms from Siebmacher's 1605 armorial

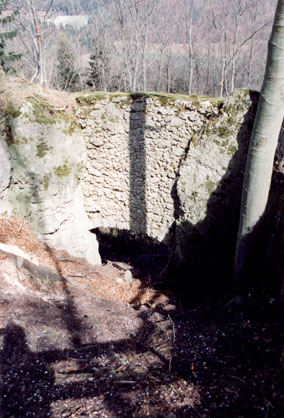
Remains of the wall closing off the ditch (January 2006)

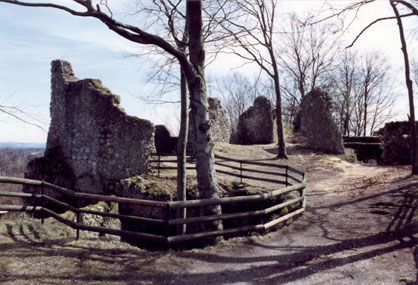
Remains of a building, the so-called Kalte Ecke ("Cold Corner") (January 2006)

The castle, whose name is probably derived from Löwenfels ("Lion Rock"), is one of the later castles to be built in Franconian Switzerland and may have been erected in the 14th century at the behest of Seibot I of Egloffstein, who is recorded between 1285 and 1332.

The castle itself is first mentioned in 1372. Lord Götz of Egloffstein had to give his part of the hitherto probably allodial castle to the Bishop of Bamberg after a feud.

In 1380 the castle was captured by troops of the Bishop of Bamberg and Burgrave Frederick V of Nuremberg. Götz of Egloffstein was taken prisoner and incarcerated in Nuremberg. His successor was also frequently involved in feuds. The castle was destroyed in 1397 on the orders of Emperor Wenceslaus.

1In 502 Jobst I of Egloffstein sold the castle to the Bishop of Bamberg and it became the seat of a small episcopal Amt.

In the Peasants' War the castle was badly damaged in 1525, but its garrison under Otto of Mengersdorf was able to prevent it being taken. The restoration of the castle was carried out immediately. In 1553, during the Second Margrave War, it was again seriously damaged. Its reconstruction was carried out more slowly this time. In 1594, Leienfels was incorporated into the episcopal Amt of Pottenstein. By 1610, the site was already being described as uninhabitable. In 1643, during the Thirty Years' War the repair of the castle was no longer considered to be worthwhile. In 1646, the bricks were of the surviving buildings were carried off and the site left to decay.

Today, the ruins have been designated by the Bavarian State Office for Monument Protection as listed site D-4-72-179-83 "Leienfels, formerly an almost triangular site, remains of the enceinte and the main building with corner tower, the core 14th century; wall of the former outer bailey, 14th century.", as well as ground monument D-4-6234-0068 "finds from the Middle Ages and early modern period in the area of the castle ruins of Leienfels"

== Literature ==
- Rüdiger Bauriedel, Ruprecht Konrad-Röder: Mittelalterliche Befestigungen und niederadelige Ansitze im Landkreis Bayreuth. Ellwanger Druck und Verlag, Bayreuth, 2007, ISBN 978-3-925361-63-0, p. 137.
- Ursula Pfistermeister: Wehrhaftes Franken - Band 3: Burgen, Kirchenburgen, Stadtmauern um Bamberg, Bayreuth und Coburg. Fachverlag Hans Carl, Nuremberg, 2002, ISBN 3-418-00387-7, pp. 84–85.
- Walter Heinz: Ehemalige Adelssitze im Trubachtal. Verlag Palm und Enke, Erlangen and Jena, 1996, ISBN 3-7896-0554-9, pp. 8–26.
- Gustav Voit, Walter Rüfer: Eine Burgenreise durch die Fränkische Schweiz. Verlag Palm und Enke, Erlangen, 1991, ISBN 3-7896-0064-4, pp. 117–120.
- Björn-Uwe Abels, Joachim Zeune, u.A.: Führer zu archäologischen Denkmälern in Deutschland, Band 20: Fränkische Schweiz. Konrad Theiss Verlag GmbH und Co., Stuttgart, 1990, ISBN 3-8062-0586-8, p. 217.
- Toni Eckert, Susanne Fischer, Renate Freitag, Rainer Hofmann, Walter Tausendpfund: Die Burgen der Fränkischen Schweiz – Ein Kulturführer. Gürtler Druck, Forchheim, ISBN 3-9803276-5-5, pp. 93–95.
- Hellmut Kunstmann: Die Burgen der östlichen Fränkischen Schweiz. Kommissionsverlag Ferdinand Schöningh, Würzburg, 1965, pp. 411–426.
