= Julie von Egloffstein =

German painter

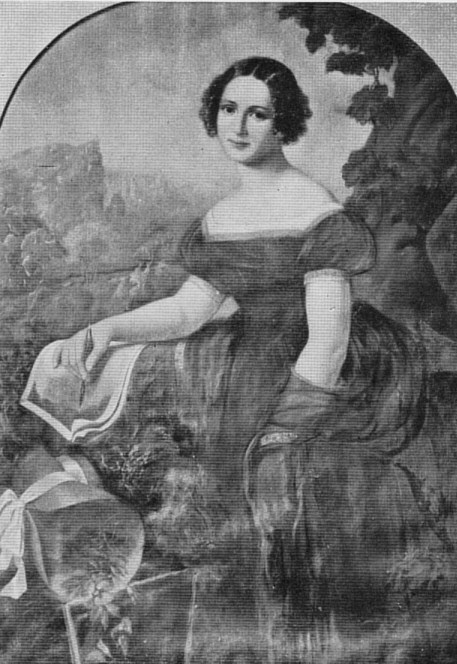
- Self portrait
- Born: 12 September 1792; Erlangen, Holy Roman Empire
- Died: 16 January 1869 (aged 76); Hildesheim, Germany
- Known for: Painting

Julie von Egloffstein (12 September 1792 – 16 January 1869), countess, canoness of Hildesheim, was a German artist, encouraged in her work by Johann Wolfgang von Goethe.

== Life ==
She was born in Erlangen, daughter of Gottfried Friedrich Leopold Graf von und zu Egloffstein and his wife Henriette.

She was one of the most beautiful and gifted women at the court of Weimar, and many of Goethe's poems bear witness to the lively interest which he took in her artistic development. She painted several portraits, including those of the Grand-Duchess of Saxe-Weimar and of Queen Theresa of Bavaria.

From 1829 to 1832 she toured Alsace, Switzerland and Italy, spending a considerable amount of time in Rome. She went to Italy again during 1838–1840, visiting Sorrento, Naples and Rome.

In addition to portraits, her works included Shepherds in the Roman Campagna (1835), Hagar in the Wilderness, The Exposure of Moses, Italian Popular Life and others, some of which were in the possession of the Emperor of Russia and of Queen Victoria.

She died on 16 January 16 1869, at Marienrode.

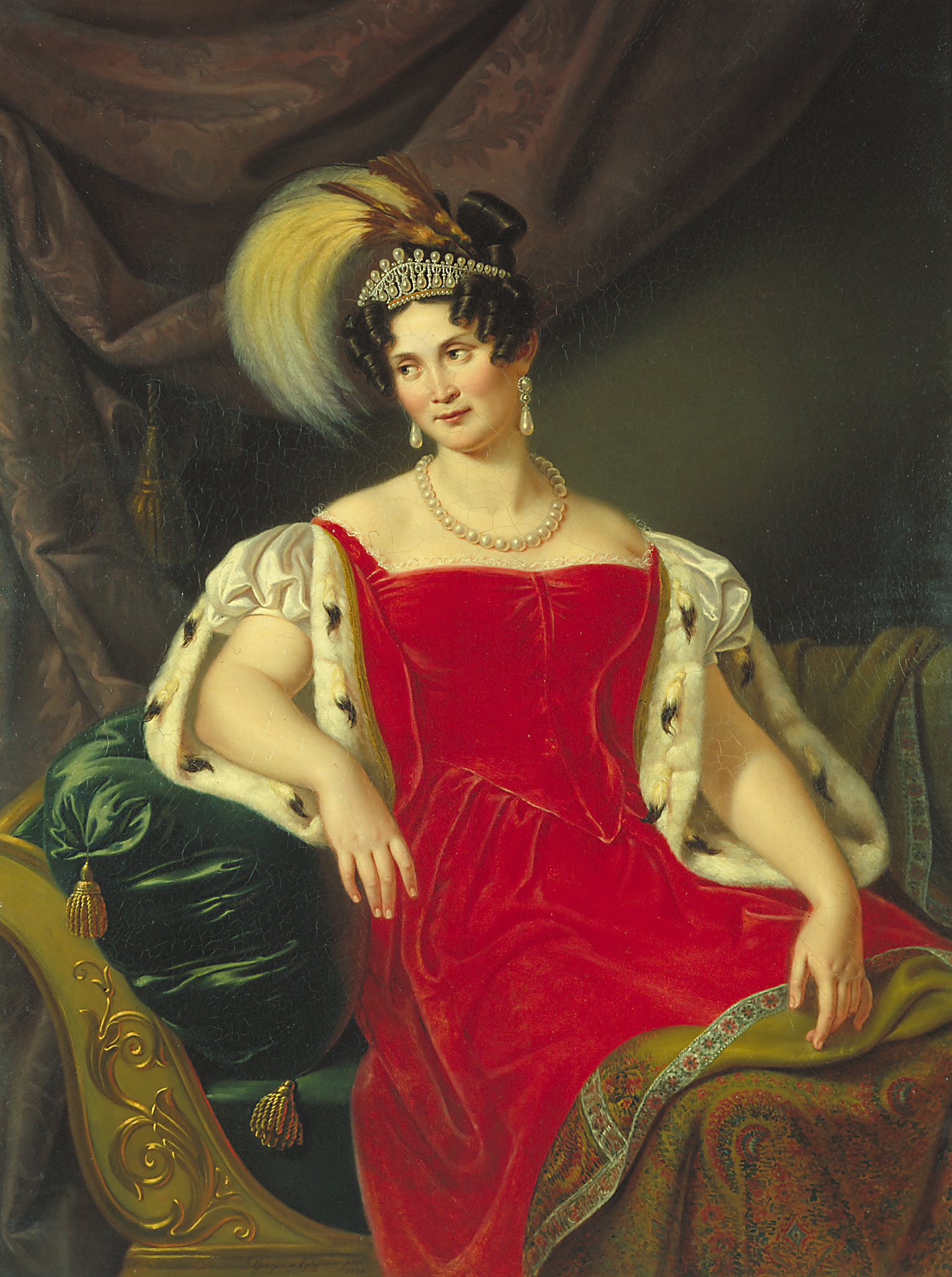
Therese of Saxe-Hildburghausen, queen of Bavaria, 1836

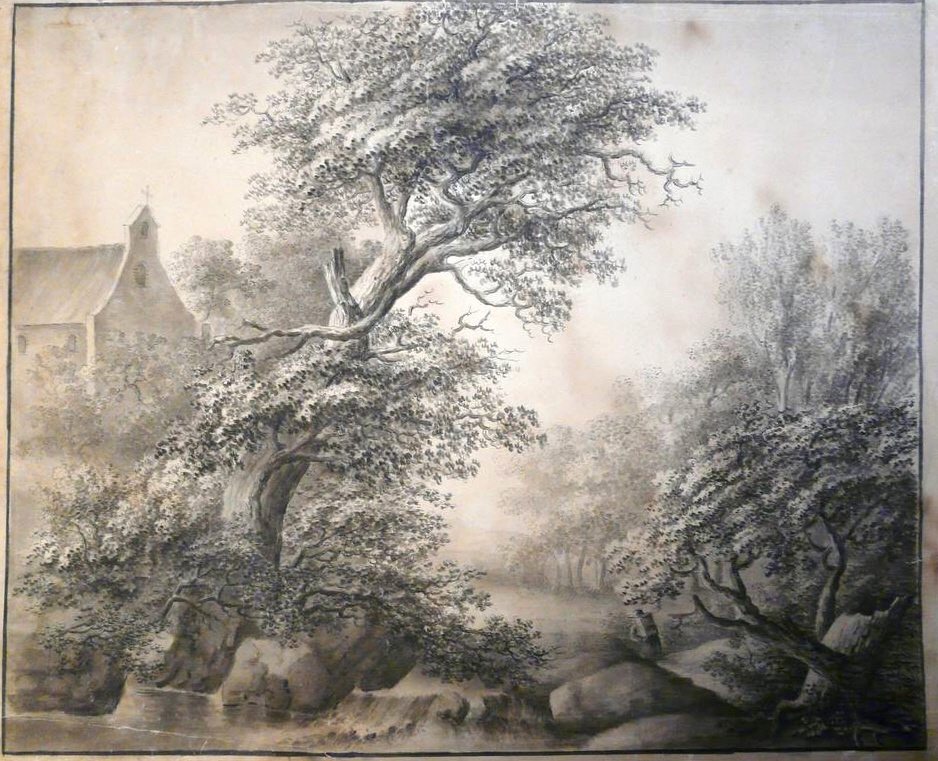
Landscape

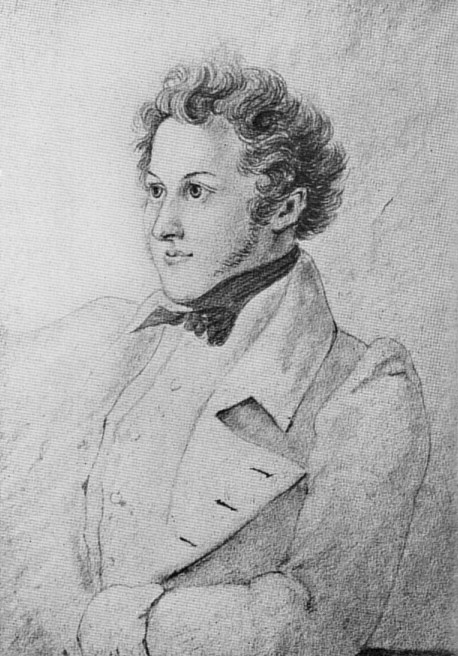
August von Goethe, son of Johann Wolfgang von Goethe.

== See also ==
- List of German painters
