= Obertrubach =

- Municipality
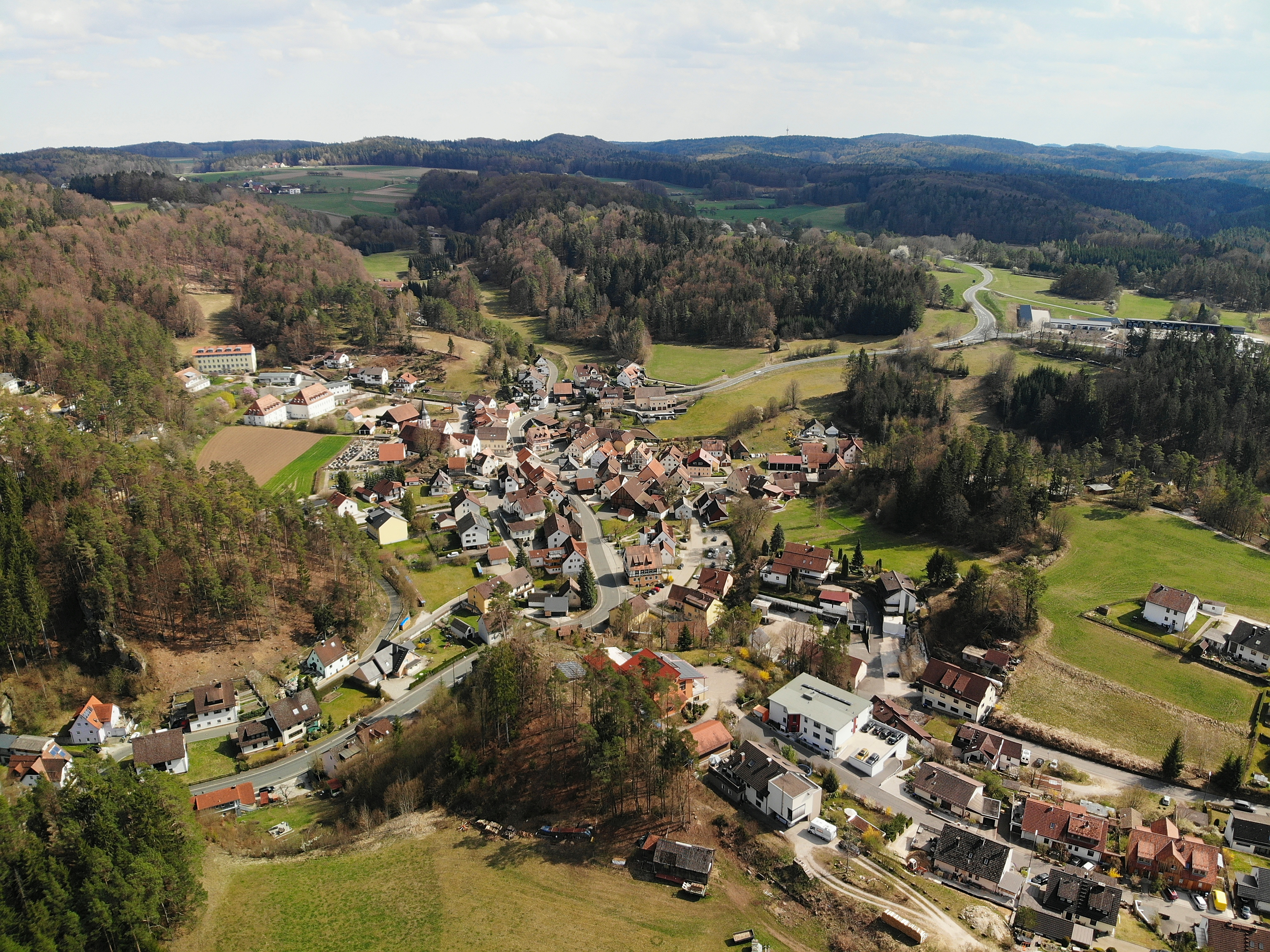
- Aerial view

- Coat of arms

- Location of Obertrubach within Forchheim district
- Interactive map of Obertrubach
- Location within Germany Location within Bavaria
- Coordinates: 49°41′42″N 11°20′58″E
- Country: Germany
- State: Bavaria
- Admin. region: Oberfranken
- District: Forchheim
- Subdivisions: 17 Ortsteile

Government
  - Mayor (2020–26): Markus Grüner (CSU)

Area
  - Total: 21.14 km^{2} (8.16 sq mi)
- Elevation: 434 m (1,424 ft)

Population (2025-12-31)
  - Total: 2,200
  - Density: 100/km^{2} (270/sq mi)
- Time zone: UTC+01:00 (CET)
  - Summer (DST): UTC+02:00 (CEST)
- Postal codes: 91286
- Dialling codes: 09245
- Vehicle registration: FO
- Website: www.obertrubach.de

Obertrubach is a municipality in the district of Forchheim in Bavaria in Germany.
