= Rüssenbach Castle =

- Ebermannstadt-Rüssenbach
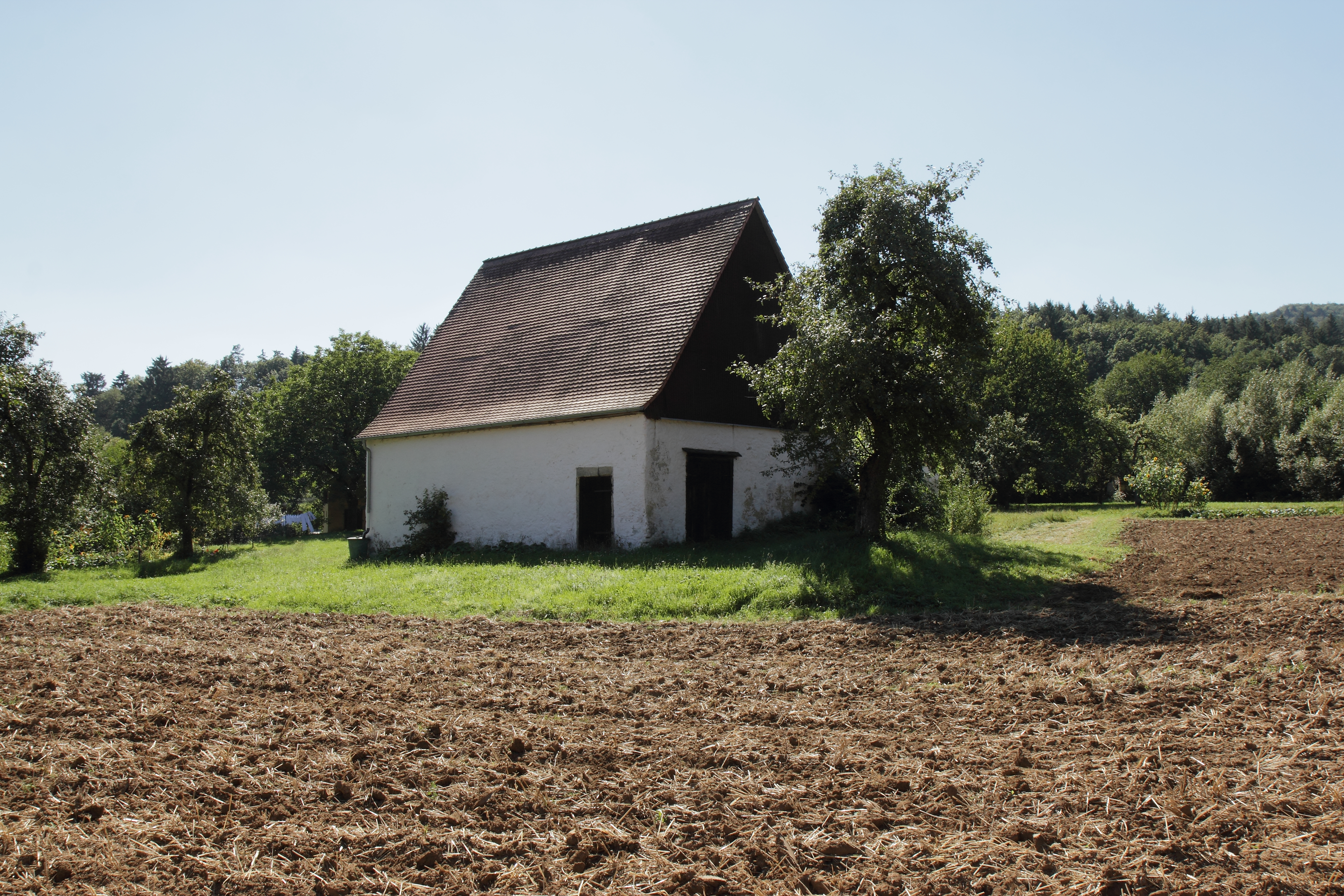
- The site of Rüssenbach Castle - view from the northeast (Sep 2013)

Site information
- Type: lowland castle, motte castle
- Code: DE-BY
- Condition: burgstall (no above-ground ruins)

Location
- Coordinates: 49°46′20″N 11°09′33″E
- Height: 310 m above sea level (NHN)

Site history
- Built: recorded 1129

Rüssenbach Castle (German: Turmhügel Rüssenbach) is a levelled water castle situated at a height of 310 m above sea level (NHN) on the northern edge of Rüssenbach, a village in the market borough of Ebermannstadt in the county of Forchheim in the south German state of Bavaria. It was built as a motte castle

The Stiebar von Buttenheim family are recorded as occupants of the castle which was mentioned in 1129 and destroyed in 1525 during the Peasants' Rebellion.

Nothing has survived of the former castle.

== Literature ==
- Denis André Chevalley (revision editor) (1986). "Oberfranken". In Michael Petzet, Bayerisches Landesamt für Denkmalpflege [in German] (ed.). Denkmäler in Bayern : Ensembles, Baudenkmäler, archäologische Geländedenkmäler [Monuments in Bavaria: ensembles, monuments, archaeological site memorials]. Denkmäler in Bayern (in German). Vol. IV (Various ed.). München: Oldenbourg. ISBN 3-486-52395-3.
- Hellmut Kunstmann. Die Burgen der südwestlichen Fränkischen Schweiz, Verlag Degener & Co., 1990.
