= Niedermirsberg Castle =

- Steinhaus
- Ebermannstadt-Niedermirsberg-Flur "Buchholz"

Site information
- Type: lowland castle, motte
- Code: DE-BY
- Condition: burgstall (no above-ground ruins)

Location
- Coordinates: 49°46′52″N 11°08′23″E
- Height: Height missing, see template documentation

Niedermirsberg Castle (German: Turmhügel Niedermirsberg), also called the Steinhaus ("Stone House"), is a levelled motte castle which is situated 780 metres west of the village church of Niedermirsberg, in the borough of Ebermannstadt in the county of Forchheim in the south German state of Bavaria.

Of the former motte nothing has survived above ground.

== Literature ==
- Denis André Chevalley (revision editor) (1986). "Oberfranken". In Michael Petzet, Bayerisches Landesamt für Denkmalpflege [in German] (ed.). Denkmäler in Bayern : Ensembles, Baudenkmäler, archäologische Geländedenkmäler [Monuments in Bavaria: ensembles, monuments, archaeological site memorials]. Denkmäler in Bayern (in German). Vol. IV (Various ed.). München: Oldenbourg. ISBN 3-486-52395-3.
- Hellmut Kunstmann: Die Burgen der südwestlichen Fränkischen Schweiz. Verlag Degener & Co., 1990.

== See also ==
- List of German motte and bailey castles
