= Alter Schlossberg (Ebermannstadt) =

- Ebermannstadt-Burggaillenreuth-"Schlossberg"
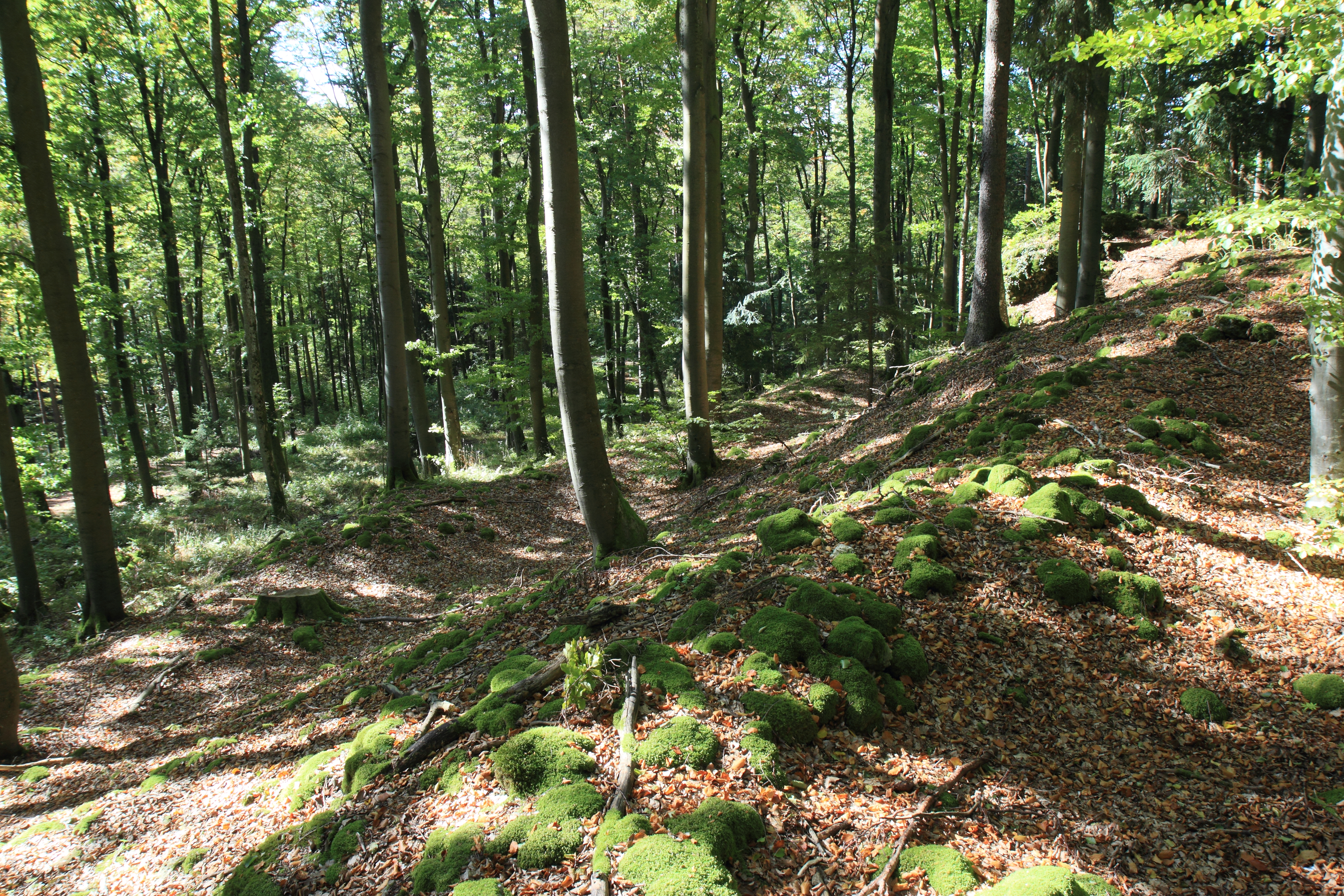
- The circular rampart of the Schlossberg

Site information
- Type: Hill castle, spur castle
- Code: DE-BY
- Condition: burgstall, a few rampart remains

Location
- Coordinates: 49°46′29″N 11°17′29″E
- Height: 482 m above sea level (NN)

Site history
- Built: Late Hallstatt and early La Tène periods

The burgstall of Alter Schlossberg (German: Burgstall Alter Schlossberg) is the site of an old castle located on a plateau-like hilltop, the so-called Schlossberg ("castle hill"), about 500 metres southeast of Burggaillenreuth, a village in the borough of Ebermannstadt in the county of Forchheim, in the south German state of Bavaria.

The medieval burgstall is the site of a spur castle, of which only a few rampart remains have survived. It appears to have been a circular rampart probably from the late Hallstatt period and early La Tène period.

== Literature ==
- Rainer Hofmann (rev.): Fränkische Schweiz. Führer zu archäologischen Denkmälern in Deutschland 20. Stuttgart, 1990
