= Ebermannstadt Castle =

Building in Upper Franconia, Germany

- Ebermannstadt-"Wacht Knock"
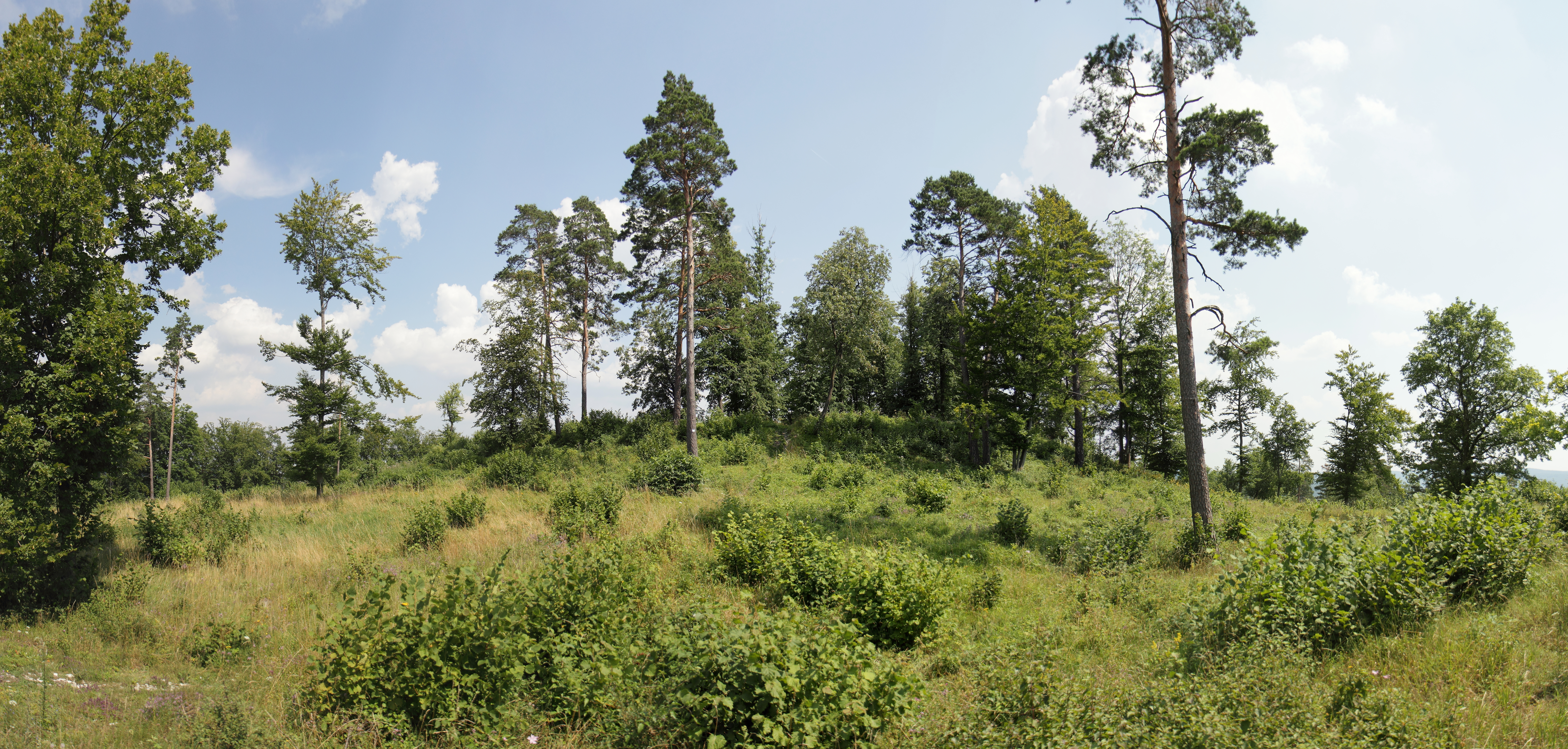
- View of the motte

Site information
- Type: hill castle, motte
- Code: DE-BY
- Condition: burgstall, motte and ramparts

Location
- Coordinates: 49°46′47″N 11°10′06″E
- Height: 470 m above sea level (NHN)

Site history
- Built: 11th century

Ebermannstadt Castle (German: Burgstall Ebermannstadt) is a levelled medieval motte castle on the heights of the Franconian Jura at Wacht Knock (470 m above sea level (NHN)), west of the town of Ebermannstadt in the county of Forchheim in the south German state of Bavaria. It is one of the mightiest motte and bailey castles.

The fortification dates to the 11th century and was probably a refuge castle. It has an area of about 2.5 hectares and occupies a hill plateau with a diameter of over 30 metres and is surrounded by the bailey which measures 120 by 100 metres. The motte, which has been levelled, is oval in shape and was up to five metres in height. It is surrounded at a distance of 22 metres by a horseshoe-shaped outer rampart.

== Literature ==
- Hellmut Kunstmann: Die Burgen der südwestlichen Fränkischen Schweiz. Veröffentlichungen der Gesellschaft für Fränkische Geschichte Reihe IX: Darstellungen aus der Fränkischen Geschichte, Vol. 28. 2. Auflage. Kommissionsverlag Degener & Co., Neustadt/Aisch, 1990, pp. 96–97.
- Denis André Chevalley (revision editor) (1986). "Oberfranken". In Michael Petzet, Bayerisches Landesamt für Denkmalpflege [in German] (ed.). Denkmäler in Bayern : Ensembles, Baudenkmäler, archäologische Geländedenkmäler [Monuments in Bavaria: ensembles, monuments, archaeological site memorials]. Denkmäler in Bayern (in German). Vol. IV (Various ed.). München: Oldenbourg. ISBN 3-486-52395-3.
- Klaus Schwarz: Die vor- und frühgeschichtlichen Geländedenkmäler Oberfrankens. (Materialhefte zur bayerischen Vorgeschichte, Series B, Vol. 5). Verlag Michael Lassleben, Kallmünz, 1955, p. 74.
