= Landsöhr Castle =

- Burg Landsöhr, Burg Landseer, Bertaburg
- Bad Boll
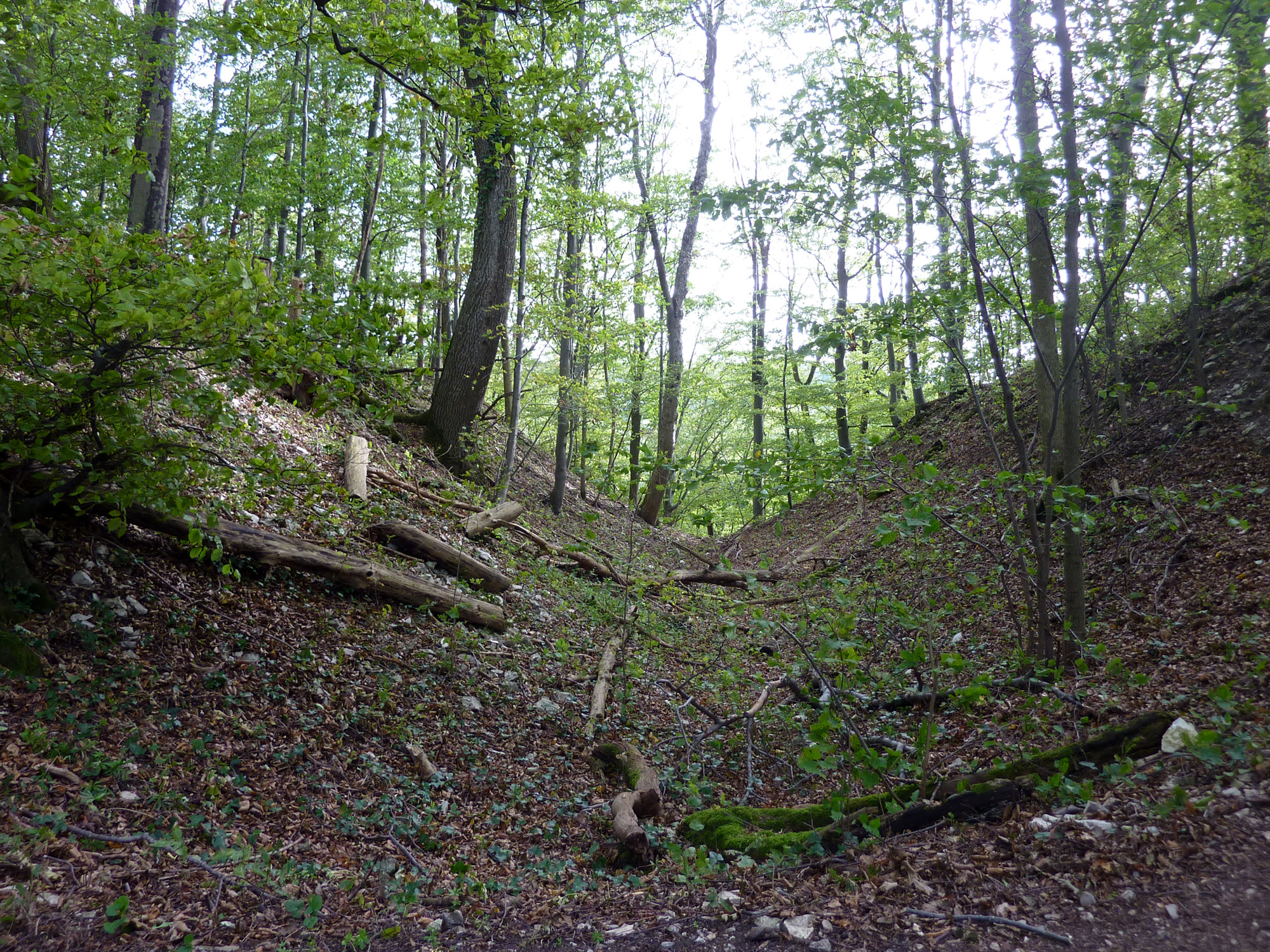
- The hollows on the hill spur

Site information
- Type: hill castle, spur castle
- Code: DE-BW
- Condition: burgstall (no above-ground ruins)

Location
- Coordinates: 48°37′24″N 9°37′38″E
- Height: 739.2 m above sea level (NHN)

Site history
- Built: first recorded in 1502

Landsöhr Castle (German: Burg Landsöhr), also called Landseer Castle (Burg Landseer) or Bertaburg, is a lost spur castle on a northern spur, 739.2 m above sea level (NHN), of the Kornberg near Bad Boll in the county of Göppingen in Baden-Württemberg.

The castle was probably built during the Celtic period as a refuge castle. The present burgstall only consists of two hollows between which the castle was probably located.

In the 12th century Berta von Boll, a sister of King Conrad III, is supposed to have had her dower seat here.

== Literature ==
- Konrad Albrecht Koch: Burgenkundliche Beiträge zum Oberamt Göppingen. In: Blätter des Schwäbischen Albvereins. 1926.
- Hartwig Zürn: Boll. In: Die vor- und frühgeschichtlichen Geländedenkmale und die mittelalterlichen Burgstellen der Kreise Göppingen und Ulm. 1961.
- Günter Schmitt: Landsöhr (Bertaburg). In: Derselbe: Burgenführer Schwäbische Alb, Band 1 – Nordost-Alb: Wandern und entdecken zwischen Aalen und Aichelberg. Biberacher Verlagsdruckerei, Biberach an der Riß, 1988, ISBN 3-924489-39-4, pp. 321–326.
