= Kornberg =

Kornberg may refer to:

== Places ==
- Kornberg (Gruibingen), a mountain in the district of Göppingen, Baden-Württemberg, Germany
- Kornberg (mountain), in the Fichtel Mountains of Bavaria, Germany
- Kornberg bei Riegersburg, a municipality in Styria, Austria
- Kornberg (Lichtenau im Waldviertel), Lichtenau im Waldviertel, a municipal division in Krems-Land District, Austria
- Kornberg (Neuhofen an der Ybbs), Neuhofen an der Ybbs, a municipal division in Amstetten District, Austria
- Schloss Kornberg, a castle near Riegersburg, Styria, Austria

== Other uses ==
- Kornberg (surname)

== See also ==
- Kronberg (disambiguation)
