= Kersbach Castle =

Kersbach Castle (Turmhügel Kersbach)
- Forchheim-Kersbach

Site information
- Type: lowland castle, motte
- Code: DE-BY
- Condition: burgstall (no above-ground ruins)

Location
- Coordinates: 49°40′49″N 11°04′10″E
- Height: 260 m above sea level (NN)

Kersbach Castle (German: Turmhügel Kersbach) is a levelled medieval motte castle in the area of Pfarrgartenstraße 1 in the village of Kersbach, in the borough of Forchheim in the eponymous county in the south German state of Bavaria.

Nothing of the old motte castle has survived above ground.

== See also ==
- List of German motte and bailey castles
