= Burk Castle =

- Forchheim-Burk-Flur Beim Schanzbach

Site information
- Type: lowland castle, motte and bailey
- Code: DE-BY
- Condition: burgstall (no above-ground ruins)

Location
- Coordinates: 49°42′38″N 11°02′32″E
- Height: Height missing, see template documentation

Site history
- Built: recorded 1127

Burk Castle (German: Turmhügel Burk) is a levelled medieval motte and bailey castle in the area known as Beim Schanzbach, about 550 metres south-southwest of the church in Burk, a village in the borough of Forchheim in the county of Forchheim in the south German state of Bavaria.

Nothing has survived of the castle which was mentioned in the records in 1127.

== Literature ==
- Denis André Chevalley (revision editor) (1986). "Oberfranken". In Michael Petzet, Bayerisches Landesamt für Denkmalpflege [in German] (ed.). Denkmäler in Bayern : Ensembles, Baudenkmäler, archäologische Geländedenkmäler [Monuments in Bavaria: ensembles, monuments, archaeological site memorials]. Denkmäler in Bayern (in German). Vol. IV (Various ed.). München: Oldenbourg. ISBN 3-486-52395-3.

== See also ==
- List of German motte and bailey castles
