= Ebermannstadt War Memorial Chapel =

Memorial building

Coordinates: 49°46′26″N 11°11′10″E

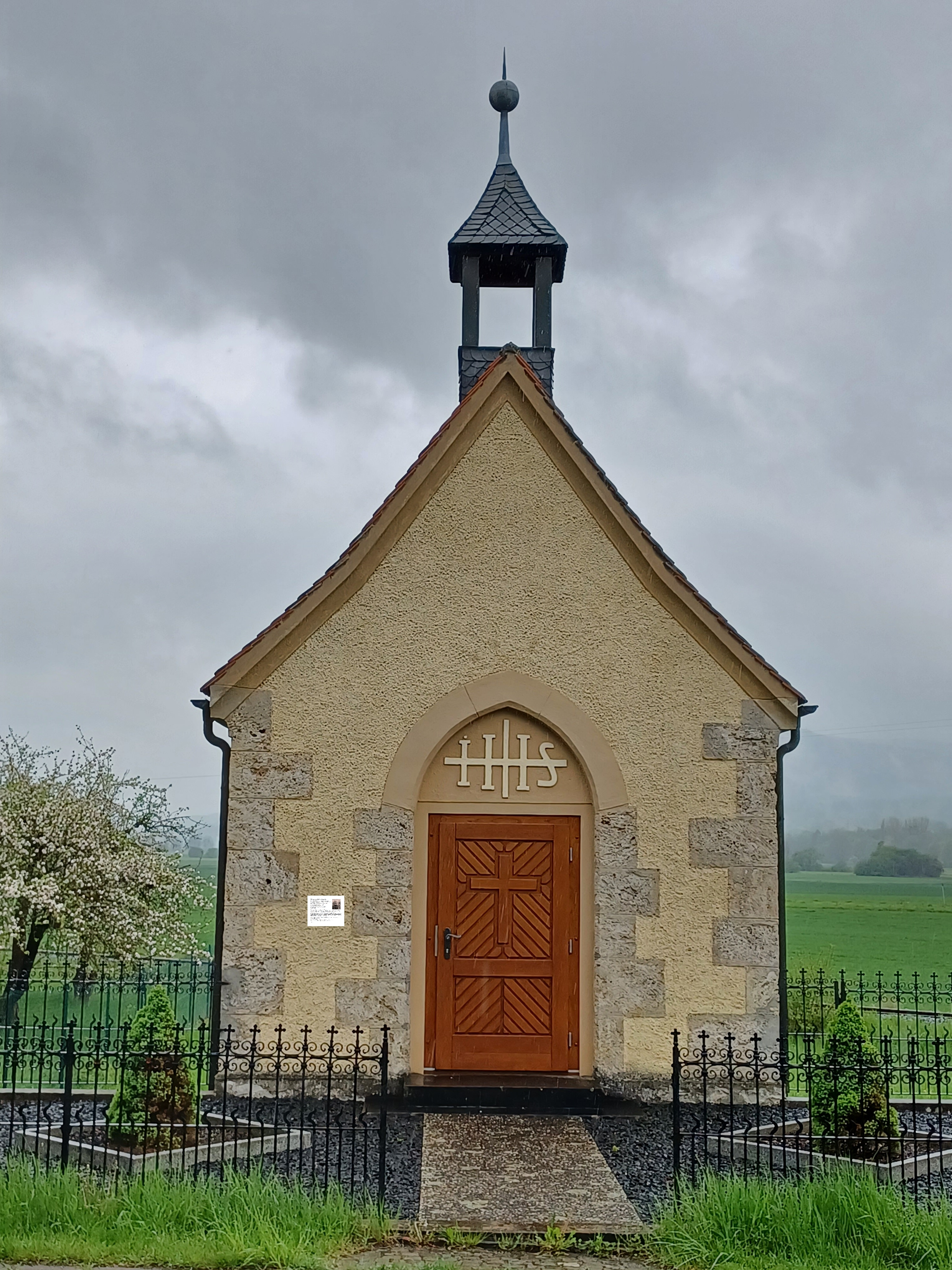
war memorial chapel Ebermannstadt

The Ebermannstadt War Memorial Chapel (German: Kriegergedächtniskapelle Ebermannstadt) is a war memorial chapel in Pretzfelder Straße on the outskirts of Ebermannstadt, in Bavaria, Germany.

== History ==
The chapel was donated by farmer Peter Martin (1851–1930), who came from a family that had already lived in Ebermannstadt in the 17th century, where he ran a farm together with his siblings.

During the First World War, Peter Martin made a promise in 1915: He wanted to build a chapel in the event that his siblings and he himself survived the war unharmed and healthy. It was to be a chapel in thanksgiving and in honor of God. The chapel was completed after Peter Martin's death by his brother Georg, with the help of his siblings and nephews. It is still privately owned today and is maintained by descendants of the founder.

The chapel was consecrated on May 31, 1931 by the then parish priest Weber.

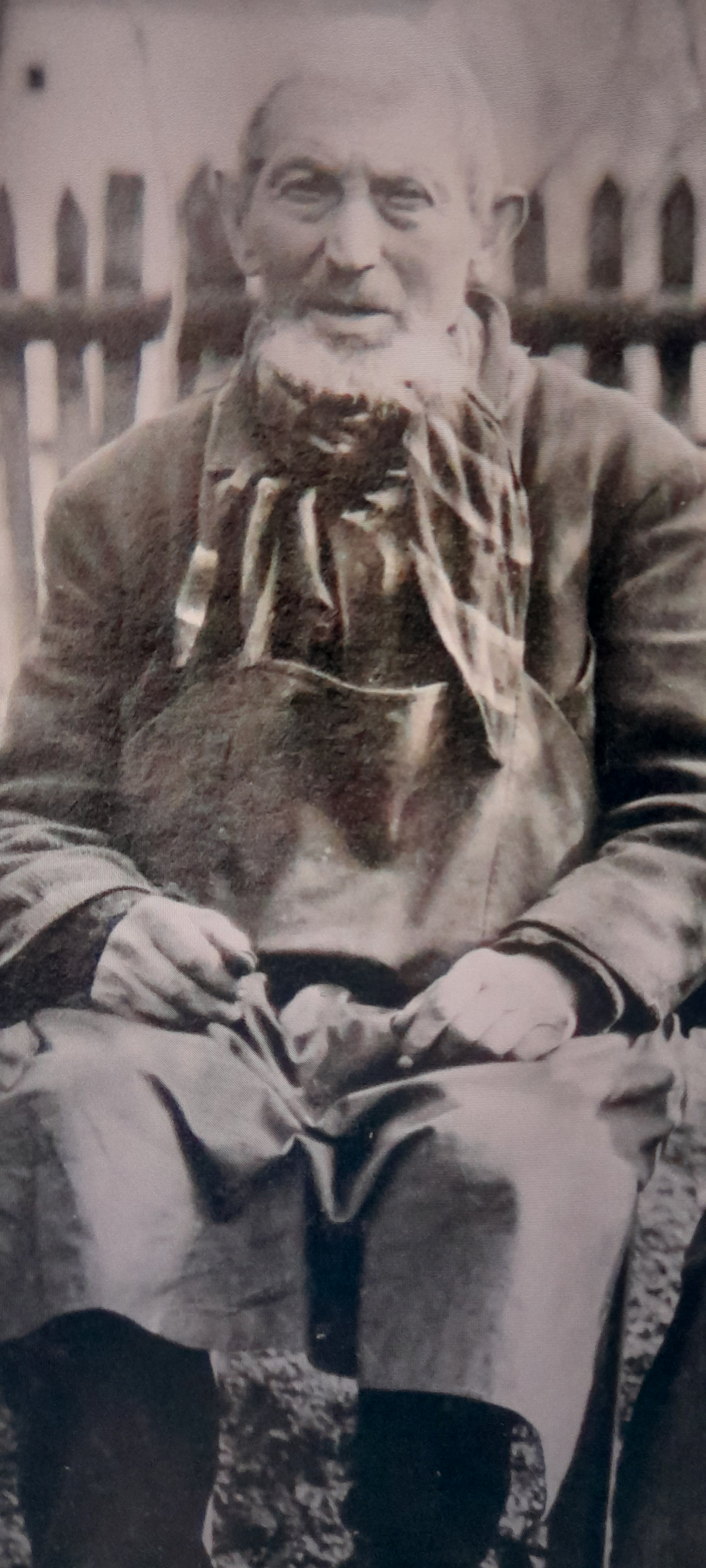
Peter Martin (donor)

Peter Martin was buried in the Ebermannstadt cemetery, together with his siblings Georg and Anna, among others. The gravestone is still preserved today.

== Building ==
The Bavarian State Office for the Preservation of Monuments lists the field chapel under the number D-4-74-121-61. The chapel is a "small hall building closed on three sides with a gabled roof and ridge turret, partially plastered solid construction on a high limestone ashlar base, neo-Gothic, after 1915; at the same time a brick forecourt base with cast-iron enclosure".

The bell was melted down for war purposes during the Second World War.

== Interior decoration ==
The four stained glass windows in the chapel are each decorated with symbols for faith, hope, love and peace. The Holy Trinity is depicted on the altar, created by the sculptor Bauer-Bamberg.
