= Kronberg (disambiguation) =

Kronberg im Taunus is a town in the Hochtaunuskreis district, Hesse, Germany.

Kronberg may also refer to:

- Kronberg (Lower Bavaria), a mountain of Bavaria, Germany
- Kronberg (mountain), a mountain of the Swiss Appenzell Alps
- Kronberg (Taunus) station, a railway station in Kronberg im Taunus, Germany
- Kronberg (Taunus) Süd station, a railway station in Kronberg im Taunus, Germany
- Kronberg Academy, a chamber music academy in Kronberg im Taunus, Germany
- Kronberg Castle, a High Middle Ages Rock castle in Kronberg im Taunus, Germany
- Kronberg Park, a park in Milwaukie, Oregon, United States
- Kronberg Railway, connects Langen, Frankfurt am Main and Kronberg im Taunusin, Hesse, Germany

== People ==
- Claes Kronberg (born 1987), Danish footballer
- Eric Kronberg (born 1983), American soccer player
- Jan Kronberg (born 1947), Australian politician
- Johann Schweikhard von Kronberg (1553–1626), Archbishop-Elector of Mainz
- Julius Kronberg (1850–1921) Swedish artist
- Juris Kronbergs (1946–2020), Latvian-Swedish poet and translator
- Kenneth Kronberg (1948–2007), American businessman and long-time member of the LaRouche movement
- Larisa Kronberg (1929–2017), Soviet Russian actress and KGB agent
- Louis Kronberg (1872–1965), American artist
- Ninni Kronberg (1874–1946), Swedish physiologist
- Robert Kronberg (born 1976), Swedish male hurdler

== See also ==
- Kornberg (disambiguation)
