= Burgstall Schlosshügel =

- Gurtstein?
- Weidenberg-Sophienthal-"Schlosshügel"
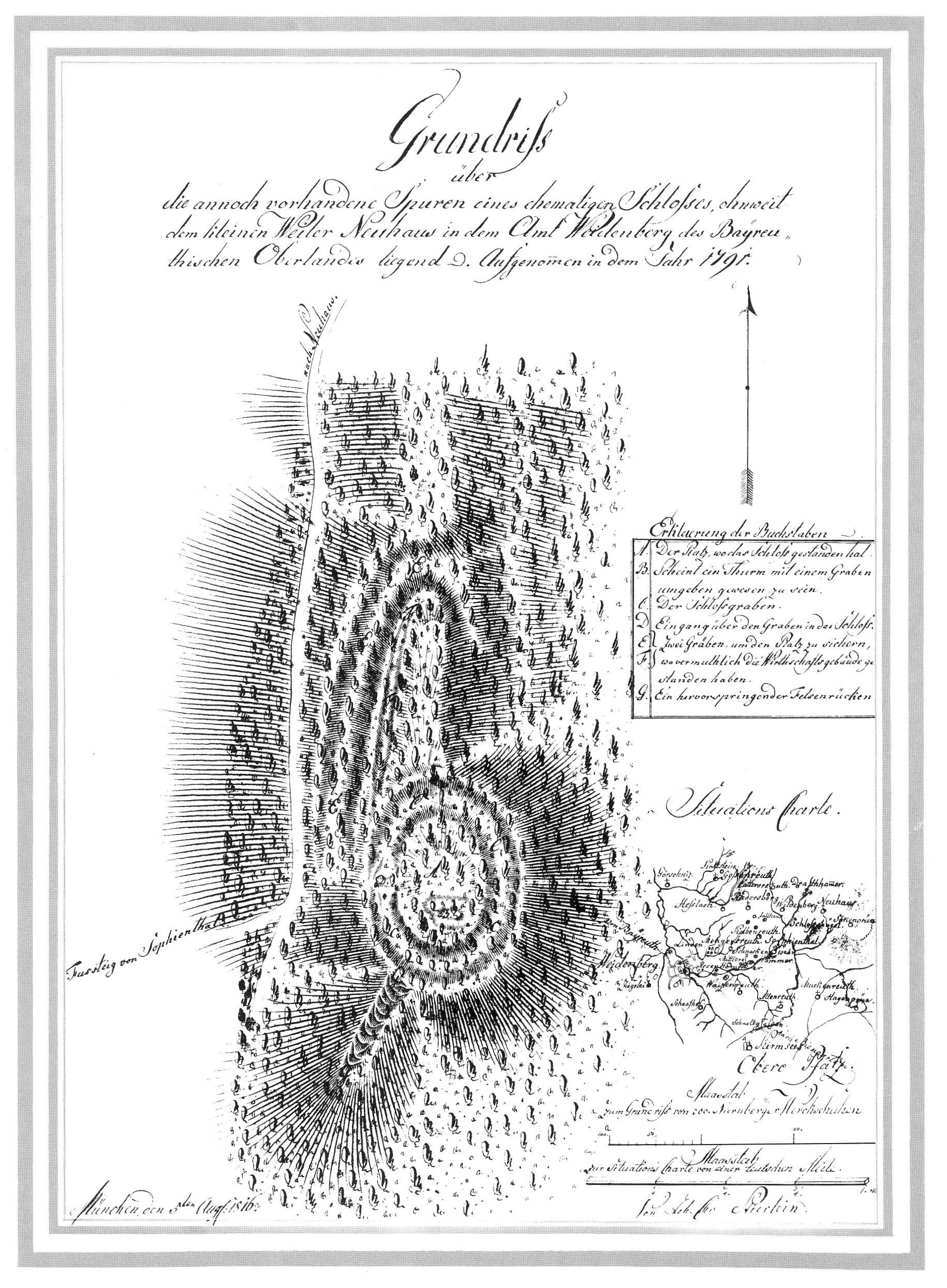
- 1791 plan of the castle site by Stierlein

Site information
- Type: hill castle, spur castle, motte
- Code: DE-BY
- Condition: burgstall with recognisable ditches and ramparts

Location
- Coordinates: 49°57′13″N 11°46′16″E
- Height: 699 m above sea level (NN)

Site history
- Built: presumably during the 11th century
- Materials: wooden palisades, log construction

Garrison information
- Occupants: unknown

The Burgstall of Schlosshügel near Weidenberg is a lost hill castle or circular rampart site of the type known as a motte from the Early Middle Ages. It lies on the southern perimeter of the Fichtel Mountains at a height of 699 metres above sea level (NN) above the village of Sophienthal, which is part of the market borough of Weidenberg in the Upper Franconia county of Bayreuth in Bavaria. The burgstall or lost castle site was partly investigated by means of an archaeological test excavation and was also mapped several times in the past.

== History ==
No records of the castle site have been found and nor is its name known. It could be the fortress listed as "Gurtstein mitsamt dem Walde" ("Gurtstein including the woods") mentioned from 1412 in deeds of enfeoffment. What is known is that a tower was built on strategically favourable high ground in order to observe the surrounding area with line-of-sight visibility to other signal or beacon hills in the Weidenberg valley, in the upper Steinach valley and in the northern part of the Upper Palatinate (with its large castle on the Rauher Kulm). Over the course of time this motte tower was expanded to form an enclosure with a circular rampart.

The local historian, Joachim Kröll, wrote about it thus:

The remains are especially easy to make out; they show how originally a tower motte stood by itself on the hill and that other parts of a fortification were built by it and protected by ditches and ramparts. The site is dated to the Romanesque period, which in comparison with other tower mottes would be no later than the early 11th century.

—

== Role and use ==
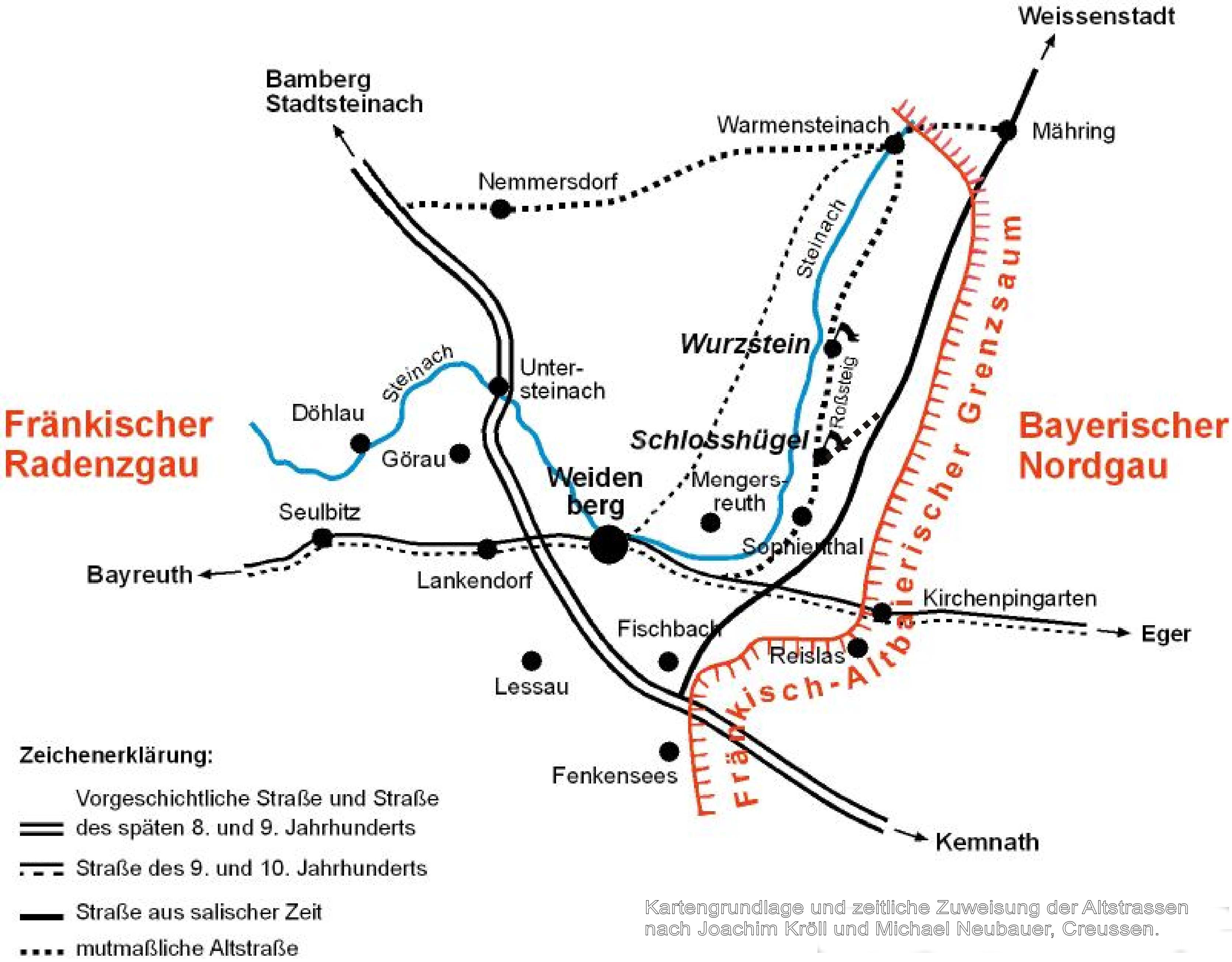
The network of old roads around Weidenberg guarded by the castle

The castle originally acted as a motte castle to monitor and guard the historic roads and to serve as a base for military escorts. It also probably fulfilled the function of a border fortress in this Franconian-Bavarian border region. For that it was extended with the construction of several defensive ramparts, in order to create room for troops to be quartered. Traces of these outer ramparts are still visible. The provision of these troops could have come from the hamlet of Neuhaus, to which a water ditch was laid from the area of the Kreuzstein which has survived into the present day.

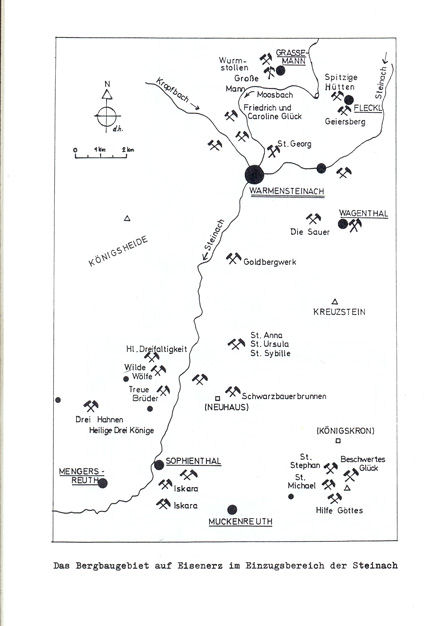
Iron mining in the upper Steinach valley.

Because of its location the castle could have been the administrative base mentioned in the records as Gurtstein mitsamt dem Walde and been used to support the royal forestry industry and medieval iron ore extraction, smelting and processing in the Steinach valley, which was later moved to Weidenberg. The charcoal needed for the production of iron was produced in the densely forested Fichtel Mountains in charcoal piles. A so-called bloomery to extract pig iron was found in the area of the present day Sophienthal. The processing of this iron was carried out in iron hammer mills on the Warme Steinach.

== Description of the site ==
The site consists of an oval-shaped, central mound measuring 30×40 metres, which is surrounded by a 6 to 10 metre wide, outer rampart with a ditch. On the uphill side there are two more rows of ramparts and ditches. This system forms two separate areas within the defensive ramparts whose common entrance lay on the west side. In the upper, inner area stood the tower. The whole site covers an area of 200×90 metres.

The earth ramparts could, have been made even higher by the use of rows of palisades filled with loose rock, as was then usual. In the inner area there is a pit, where excavations were conducted by the History Society of Upper Franconia (Historischer Verein für Oberfranken) in 1888/89. At a depth of 3 metres on the rocky base they came across a staircase of eight steps hewn out of the mica schist. This may have been the site of the tower. In the inner and northern external area there were probably domestic buildings. These buildings and the tower were made of wood.

The size of the site suggest it had pan-regional significance. It lay on a wooded, domed hilltop whose view into the Weidenberg valley is obscured today, Weidenberger Tal, in the northern Upper Palatinate (Rauher Kulm) and to the Bocksleite opposite, a hill ridge over which a trade and military road ran in the late 8th and 9th centuries. This ran from Bamberg and the Upper Mainland into the Egerland. Other historic roads ran from north to south into the interior of the Fichtel Mountains and from east to west towards Eger (now Cheb).

In the archives of the History Society of Upper Franconia were several finds from test excavations on the Schlosshügel in the years 1846 and 1888/89. Amongst the artefacts found were shards of earthenware jars decorated with wavy lines, coal, bones and iron objects. The associate professor (Privatdozent) at the University of Bamberg, Hans Losert, published photographs of pieces of pottery that had been found on the Schlosshügel.

== Illustrations of the ground plan ==
The first sketch of the burgstall was made by Johann Christoph Stierlein in 1791 and is now held in the Bavarian State Library at Munich (Bayerischen Staatsbibliothek München). There are also location sketches by Erich von Guttenberg from 1921 and Joachim Kröll from 1966 in his book Geschichte des Marktes Weidenberg ("History of the Market Town of Weidenberg"). A geodetic survey of the site was carried out in 1989 by Hermann Kerscher of the Bavarian State Office for Heritage Conservation (Bayerisches Landesamt für Denkmalpflege).

In his work on heritage site surveys Hermann Kerscher compares the 1791 drawing of the circular rampart by Stierlein with the modern survey of 1989.

The burgstall of Schlosshügel was described by Bavarian State Office for Heritage Conservation as a "medieval burgstall" and as a heritage site with the index no. 171622 and document no. D-4-6036-0002.

== Viewing the site ==
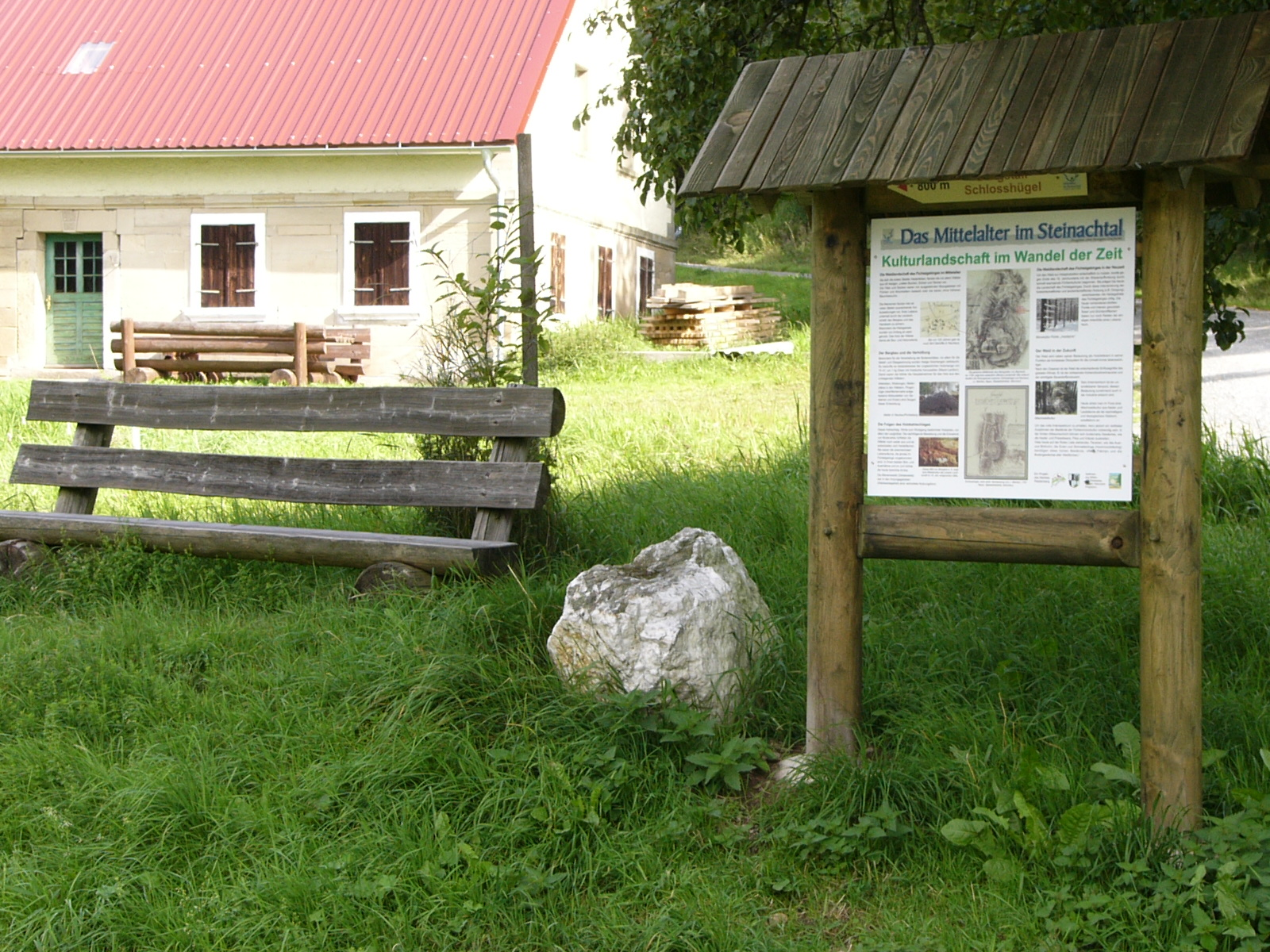
Information board near the abandoned hamlet of Neuhaus on the way to the burgstall

Access to the castle site is possible on foot and by bicycle. There is a suitable hikers' car park, the Wanderparkplatz Sophienthal, on Sophienthal Circular Walk 5 by the Weidenberg Branch of the Fichtelgebirge Club. After 3 kilometres the route reaches the abandoned settlement of Neuhaus. This is a ruined hamlet, which formerly had five farmhouses, set in a secluded forest clearing. Today the only building left is one used by the forestry commission.

At the information board on the circular path, a waymarked path branches off and runs for about 500 metres southwards following the contours to the burgstall on the left of the path.

From Neuhaus the nearby ruins of Wurzstein Castle can also be visited on a direct route over the so-called Rosssteig path. In addition there is another path to the abandoned hamlet of Sonnengrün.

Under the title Mittelalter im Steinachtal ("Middle Ages in the Steinach Valley") the Association of the Fichtel Mountain Nature Park have erected information boards at the car park (Wanderparkplatz Sophienthal), in Neuhaus and on the Schlosshügel hill itself.

== Gallery ==
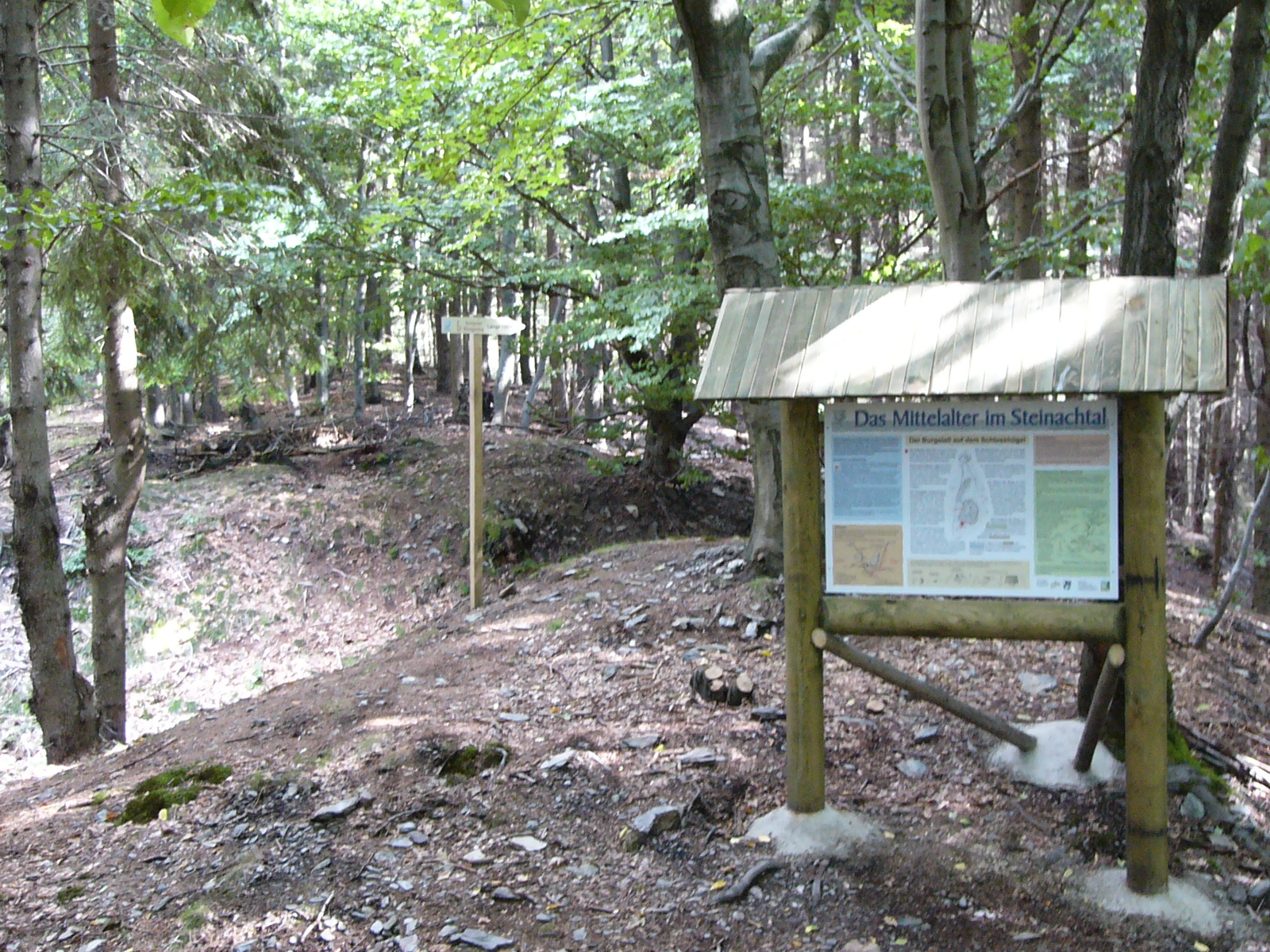
Information board at the burgstall

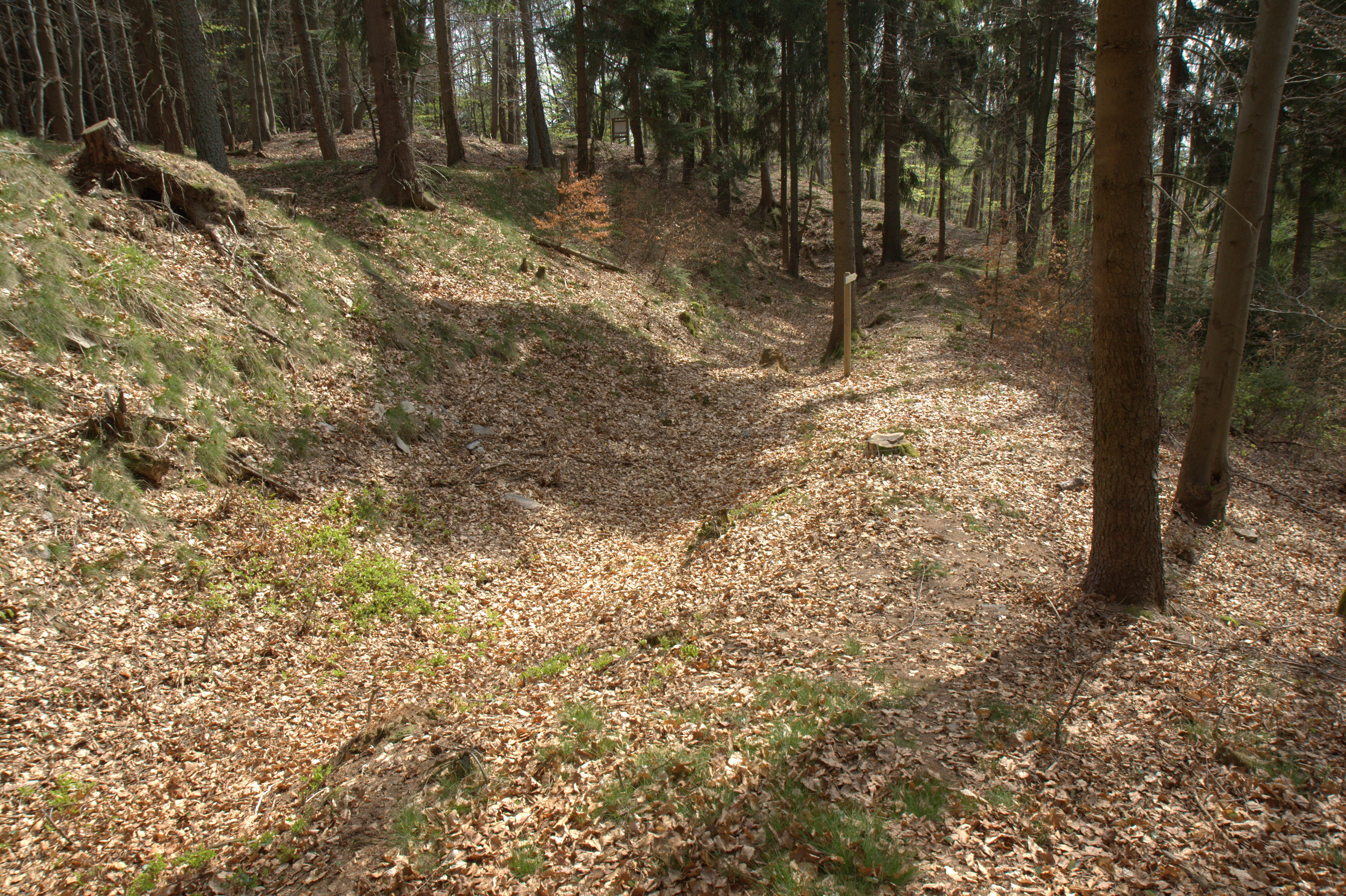
Area of the entrance on the western side of the site

== Literature ==
- Historischer Verein für Oberfranken: Jahresbericht der Jahre 1846/47; Beschreibung einer Begehung der Ringwallanlage am Schlosshügel durch eine Kommission des Vereins im Jahre 1843.
- Joachim Kröll: Geschichte des Marktes Weidenberg. Verlag Marktgemeinde Weidenberg, Gesamtherstellung Julius Steeger & Co. GmbH, Bayreuth, 1967.
- Hermann Kerscher (Landesamt für Denkmalpflege): Zweihundert Jahre topografische Denkmalvermessung in Bayern. Anmerkungen zu frühen archäologisch-topographischen Plänen des Ruinenkartographen Johann Christoph Stierlein, Archäologisches Jahr Bayern, Stuttgart, 1989.
- Rüdiger Bauriedel, Ruprecht Konrad-Röder: Mittelalterliche Befestigungen und niederadelige Ansitze im Landkreis Bayreuth. Ellwanger Druck und Verlag, Bayreuth, 2007, ISBN 978-3-925361-63-0, pp. 98 and 104.
- Werner Schamel: Geheimnisse des Schlosshügels, In: "Seinerzeit…". Heimatkundliche Serie im Amtlichen Mitteilungsblatt der Verwaltungsgemeinschaft Weidenberg Nummer 14, 30 September 2008.
