= Altraderach Castle =

Castle in Baden-Württemberg, Germany

- Burg Altraderach, Weiherberg, Heidenschlösschen, Tannenburg
- Friedrichshafen-Kluftern-"Weiherberg"
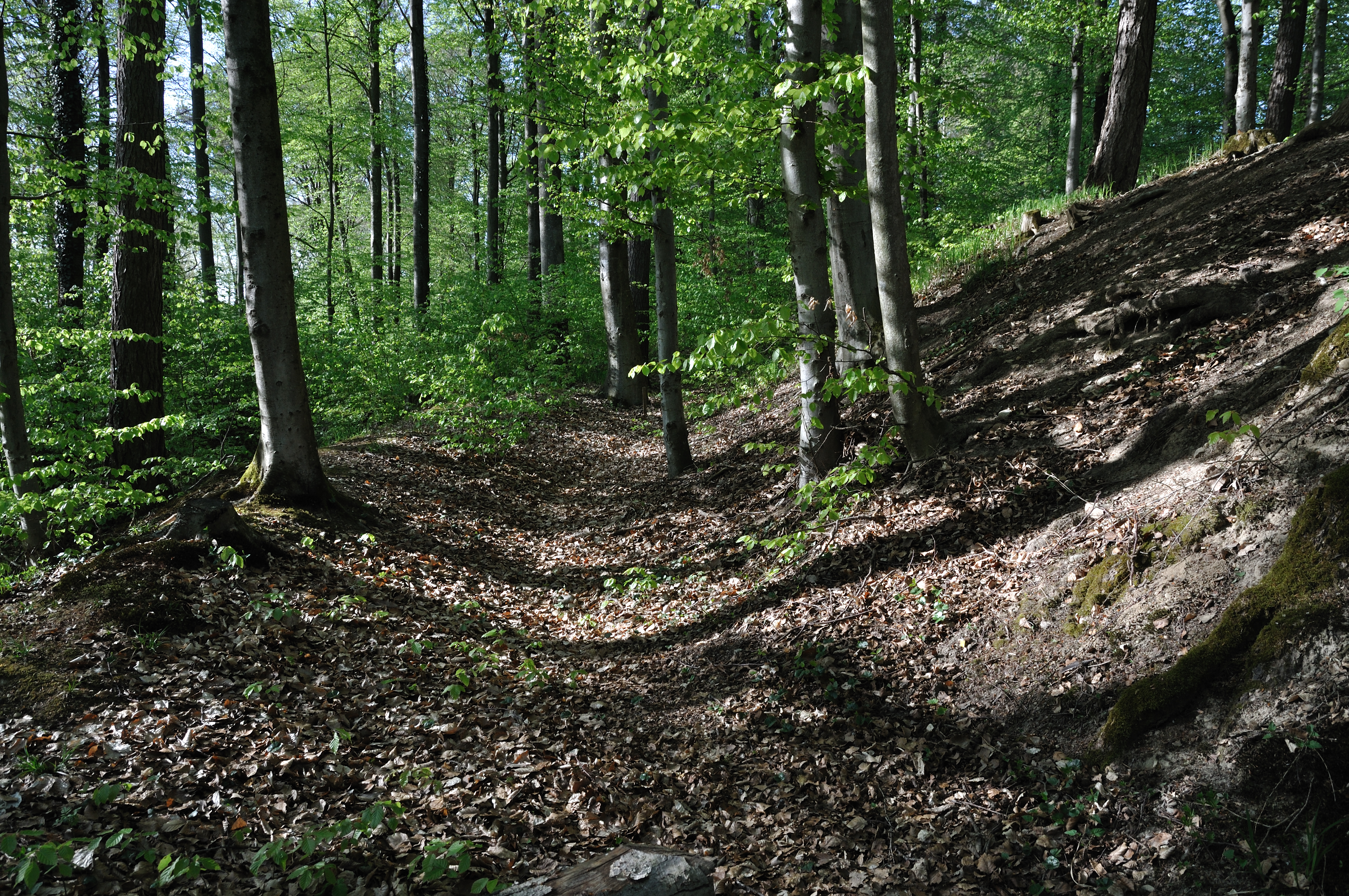

Site information
- Type: lowland castle
- Code: DE-BW
- Condition: lost or levelled

Location
- Coordinates: 47°41′30″N 9°26′00″E
- Height: 472.4 m above sea level (NN)

Site history
- Built: 12th century

Altraderach Castle (German: Burg Altraderach), also called the Old Castle (Alte Burg) or Little Heathen Palace (Heidenschlösschen), is a levelled castle in the area between Unterraderach and Raderach. The still easily visible burgstall lies in the parish of Kluftern in the borough of Friedrichshafen in the county of Bodenseekreis in the German state of Baden-Württemberg.

== History ==
The castle was built in the 12th century by the lords of Raderach and first mentioned in 1160, when Werner of Raderach witnessed the transfer of serfs to St. Blaise Abbey, and was abandoned around 1250.

== Description ==
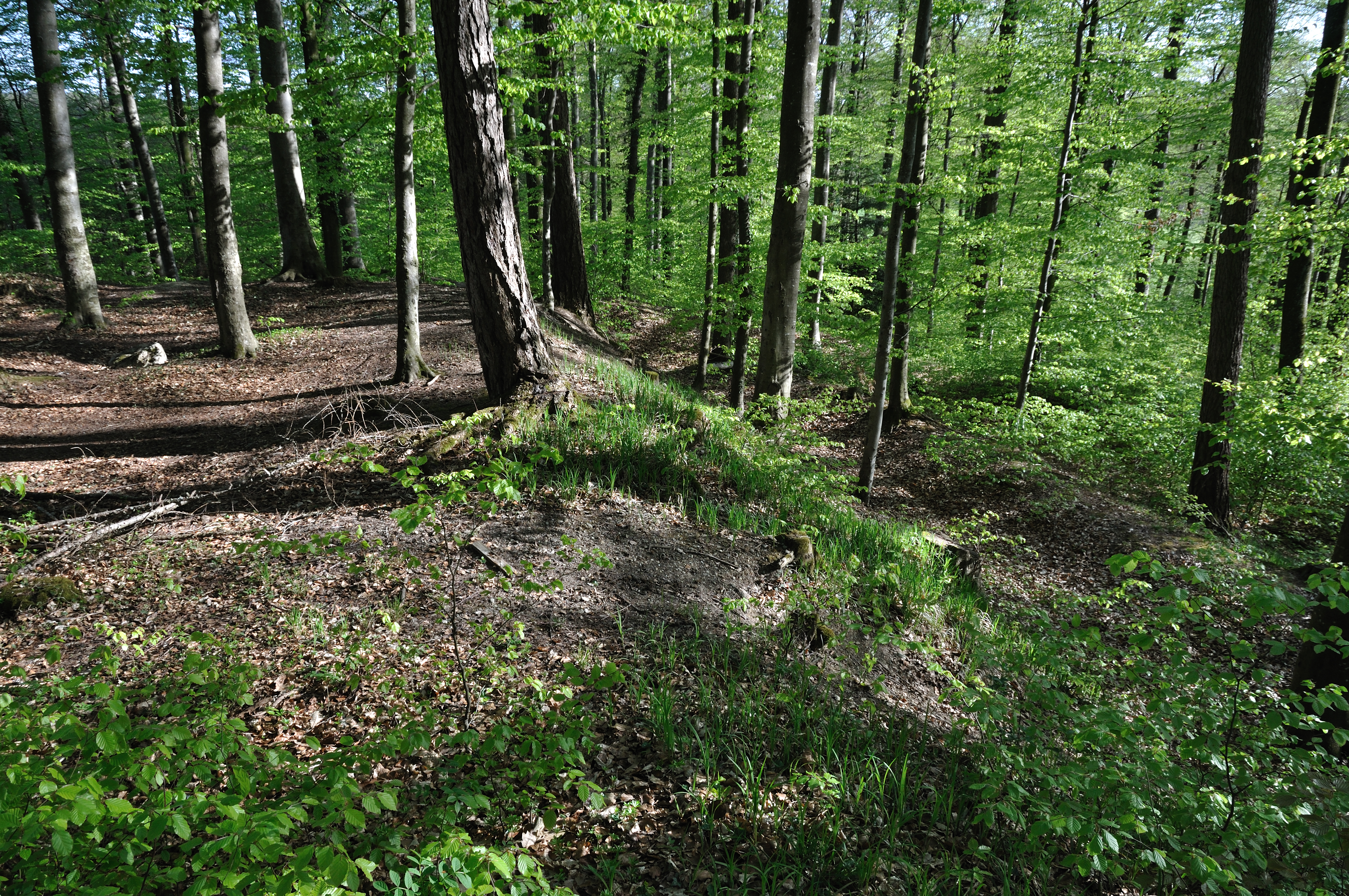
The burgstall with its ditches and western rampart

The main area of the castle measures about 20 by 21 metres and is surrounded today by an easily recognisable, circular ditch, whose outer boundary is marked by an outer rampart or embankment (Wallrippe). On the steep eastern hillside, the circular ditch transitions directly into the slope; on the other sides, the remnants of an outer bank can still be made out. The flat northern side of the site is guarded by a high embankment and a roughly 2.5 metre deep ditch, which is interrupted at the northwestern corner of the site. Clearly there was a (probably more recent) entrance between this corner and the western section of embankment. On the western side the embankment is markedly lower, but still easy to make out, on the south side it has slipped to form a terrace with a slight eminence.

Local accounts locate the story of Christoph von Schmid's Rosa von Tannenburg (the Old Castle representing the Tannenburg) and the demolished New Castle (Fichtenburg) in Raderach. As a result there is a road called the Fichtenburgstraße in Raderach and a Tannenburgstraße in nearby Unterraderach.

== Literature ==
- Alois Schneider: Burgen und Befestigungen im Bodenseekreis. In: Landesdenkmalamt Baden-Württemberg (publ.): Fundberichte aus Baden-Württemberg. Vol. 14. 1st edn., E. Schweizerbart'sche Verlagsbuchhandlung, Stuttgart, 1989, ISBN 3 510 49114 9, ISSN 0071-9897, pp. 552–555.
