= Weidenberg =

- Municipality
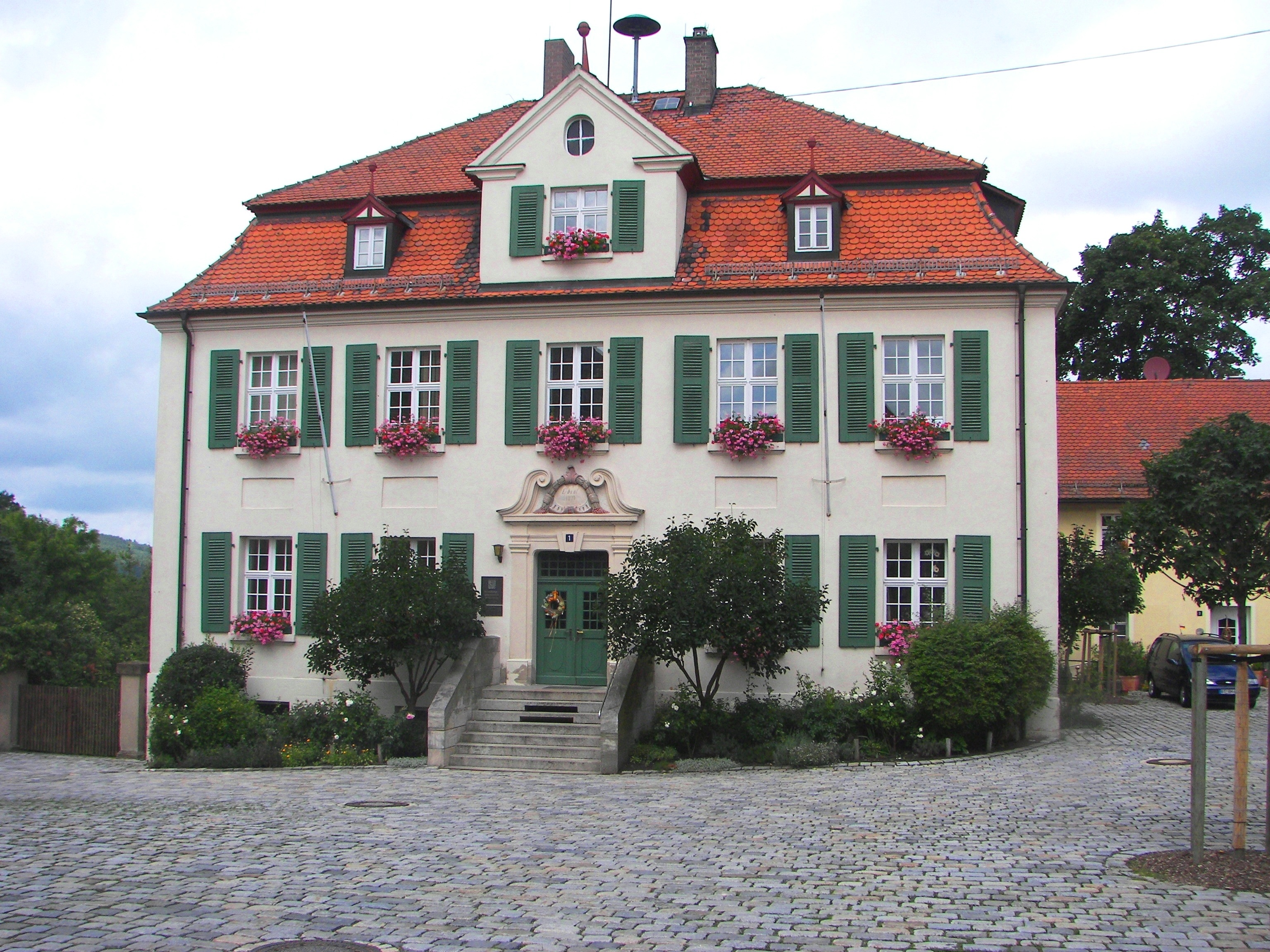
- Town hall

- Coat of arms

- Location of Weidenberg within Bayreuth district
- Interactive map of Weidenberg
- Location within Germany Location within Bavaria
- Coordinates: 49°56′32″N 11°43′13″E
- Country: Germany
- State: Bavaria
- Admin. region: Oberfranken
- District: Bayreuth
- Municipal assoc.: Weidenberg
- Subdivisions: 52 Ortsteile

Government
  - Mayor (2020–26): Hans Wittauer (FW)

Area
  - Total: 68.91 km^{2} (26.61 sq mi)
- Elevation: 357–853 m (1,171–2,799 ft)

Population (2025-12-31)
  - Total: 5,811
  - Density: 84.33/km^{2} (218.4/sq mi)
- Time zone: UTC+01:00 (CET)
  - Summer (DST): UTC+02:00 (CEST)
- Postal codes: 95466
- Dialling codes: 09278 / 09209 / 0921
- Vehicle registration: BT
- Website: www.weidenberg.de

Weidenberg is a municipality in the district of Bayreuth in Bavaria in Germany. The Ölschnitz river discharges near Weidenberg-Neunkirchen into the Red Main.

Nearby is the site of a medieval castle, known as Burgstall Schlosshügel.
