= Kornberg (Gruibingen) =

Mountain in Germany

- Location within Germany

Highest point
- Elevation: 779 m (2,556 ft)
- Coordinates: 48°37′11″N 9°38′01″E

Geography
- Location: Baden-Württemberg, Germany

Kornberg (Gruibingen) is a mountain located in the Gruibingen municipality of the Göppingen district, Baden-Württemberg, Germany. It is 778.2 m high and part of the Northern rim of the Swabian Jura.

Not far north of Kornberg, the ruins of Landsöhr Castle are situated, colloquially also known as Bertaburg. The long-distance Swabian Jura North Rim hiking trail (HW 1) leads past Kornberg. Southeast of the mountain top the Kornberg Cottage is located, erected in 1922.

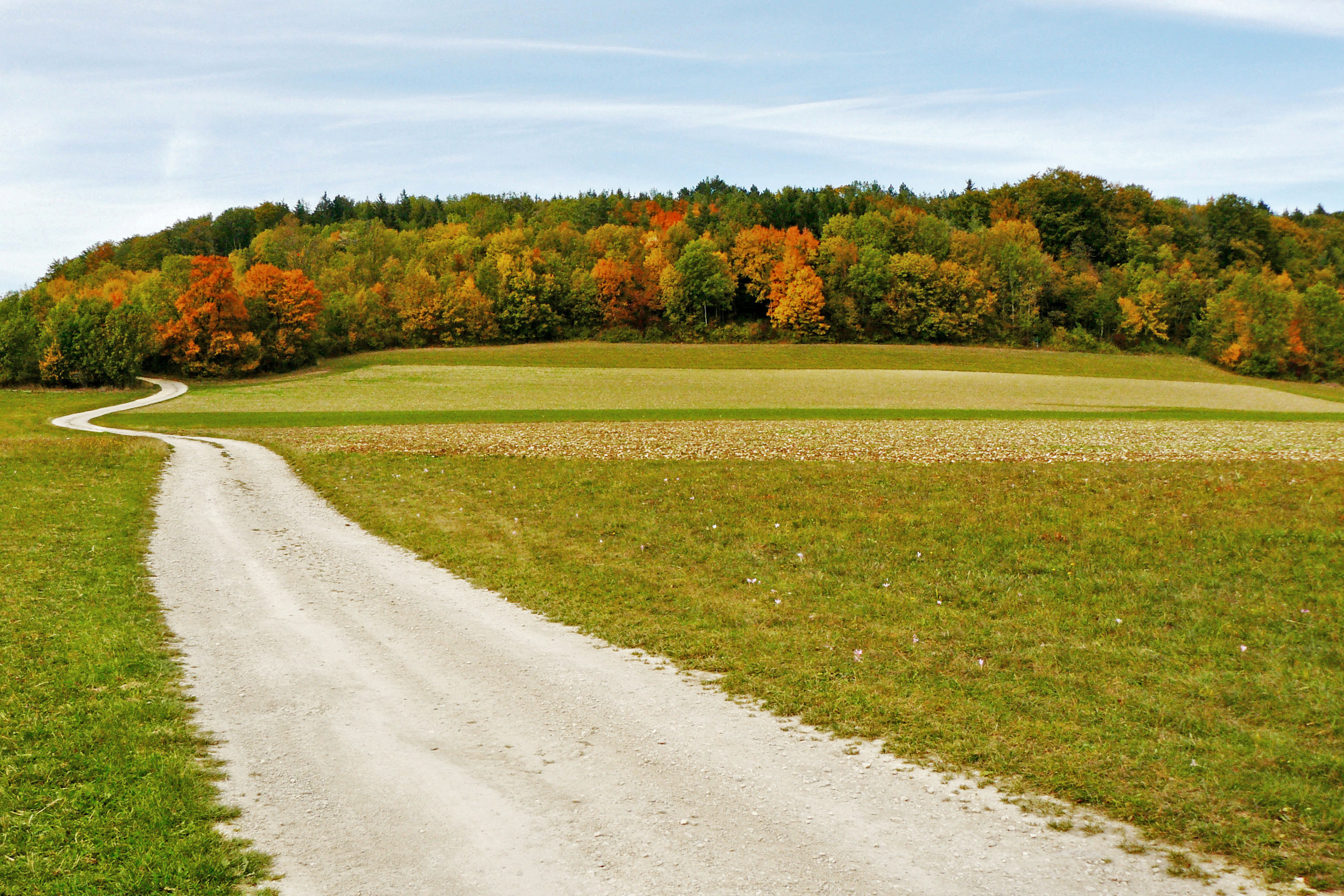
Kornberg Gruibingen

== Kornberg Nature Reserve ==
In 2004, Kornberg and its southern foothills Barn were recorded as the nature reserve Kornberg. The reserve covers an area of 189.8 ha. Protective purpose is the preservation and promotion of ecologically diverse, small-scale and interlinked landscape elements with juniper heath, succession areas, hedges, extensively farmed species-rich meadows, some economic fields and natural deciduous forests with their typical animal and plant species. The preservation of a cultural landscape as a witness partly historical use patterns, in particular the conservation of juniper heathland and extensively farmed meadows.
