= Ebermannstadt =

- Town
- Coat of arms

- Location of Ebermannstadt within Forchheim district
- Interactive map of Ebermannstadt
- Location within Germany Location within Bavaria
- Coordinates: 49°46′N 11°10′E
- Country: Germany
- State: Bavaria
- Admin. region: Upper Franconia
- District: Forchheim
- Municipal assoc.: Ebermannstadt
- Subdivisions: 14 districts

Government
  - Mayor (2020–26): Christiane Meyer

Area
  - Total: 49.95 km^{2} (19.29 sq mi)
- Elevation: 292 m (958 ft)

Population (2025-12-31)
  - Total: 6,692
  - Density: 134.0/km^{2} (347.0/sq mi)
- Time zone: UTC+01:00 (CET)
  - Summer (DST): UTC+02:00 (CEST)
- Postal codes: 91316–91320
- Dialling codes: 09194
- Vehicle registration: FO (old: EBS)
- Website: www.ebermannstadt.de

Ebermannstadt (German pronunciation: [ˈeːbɐmanʃtat]; East Franconian: Ärmaschdood) is a town in the district of Forchheim, in Bavaria, Germany. It is situated 10 km northeast of Forchheim and 25 km southeast of Bamberg.

== Districts ==
- Breitenbach
- Ebermannstadt
- Gasseldorf
- Niedermirsberg
- Rüssenbach
- Neuses-Poxstall
- Wohlmuthshüll
- Buckenreuth
- Moggast
- Wolkenstein
- Thosmühle
- Burggaillenreuth
- Windischgaillenreuth
- Eschlipp
- Kanndorf

== History ==
The place on which Ebermannstadt is located today was already named imperial "villa Ebermarstad" in 981. At one point later it became the possession of the Schlüsselberger family. In 1430, the Hussites destroyed the place. Again, Ebermannstadt faced destructions during the Second Margrave War in 1552, the Thirty Years' War and finally in 1796 when the French army passed through the town. Albrecht Dürer stayed in Ebermannstadt in 1515 and painted an oil-painting of the town.

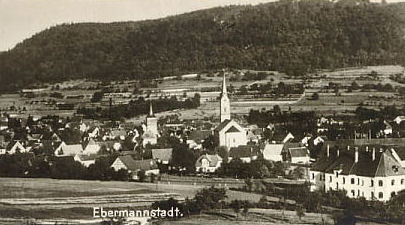
Ebermannstadt in 1928

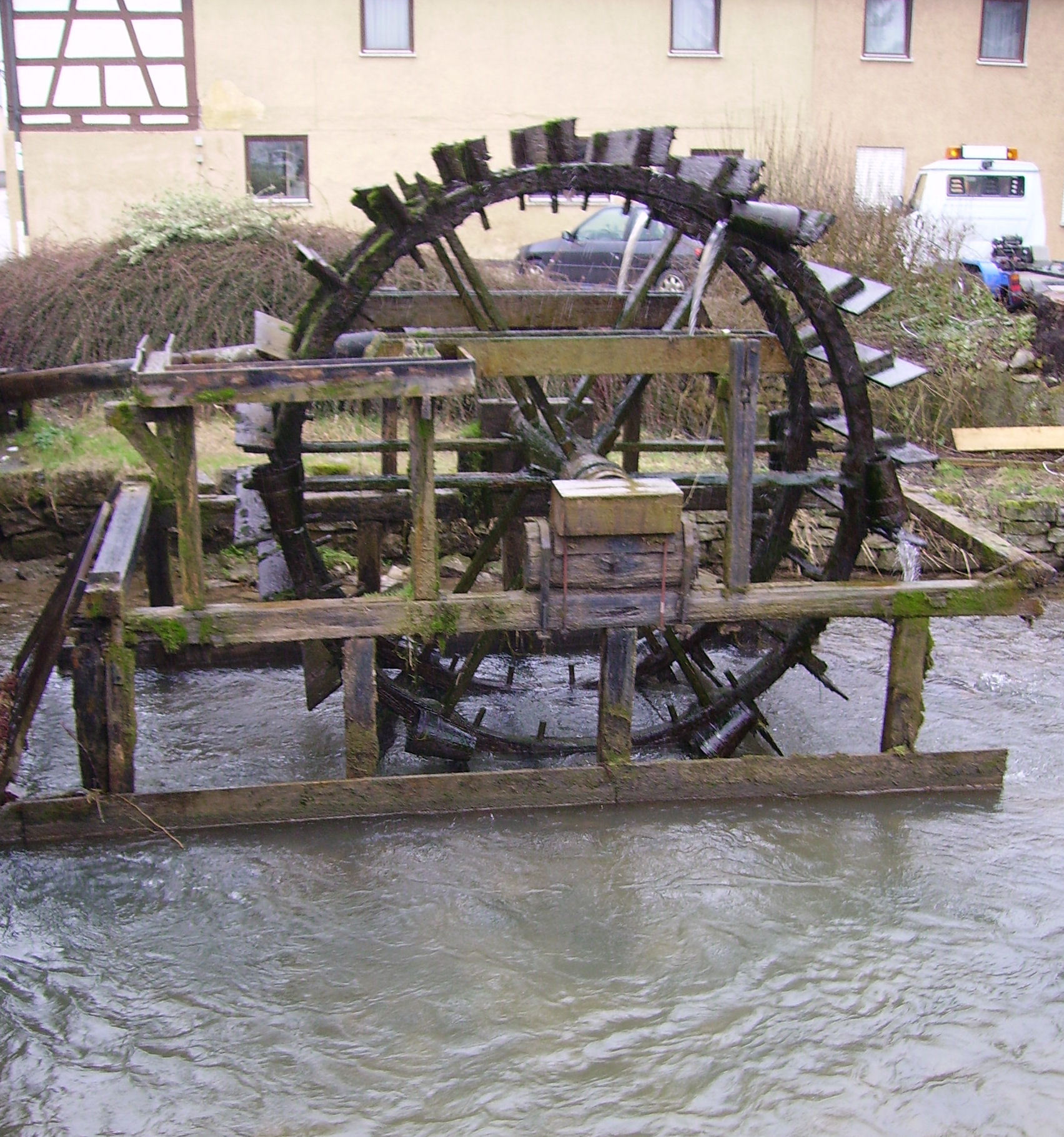
Scoop wheel on the Wiesent

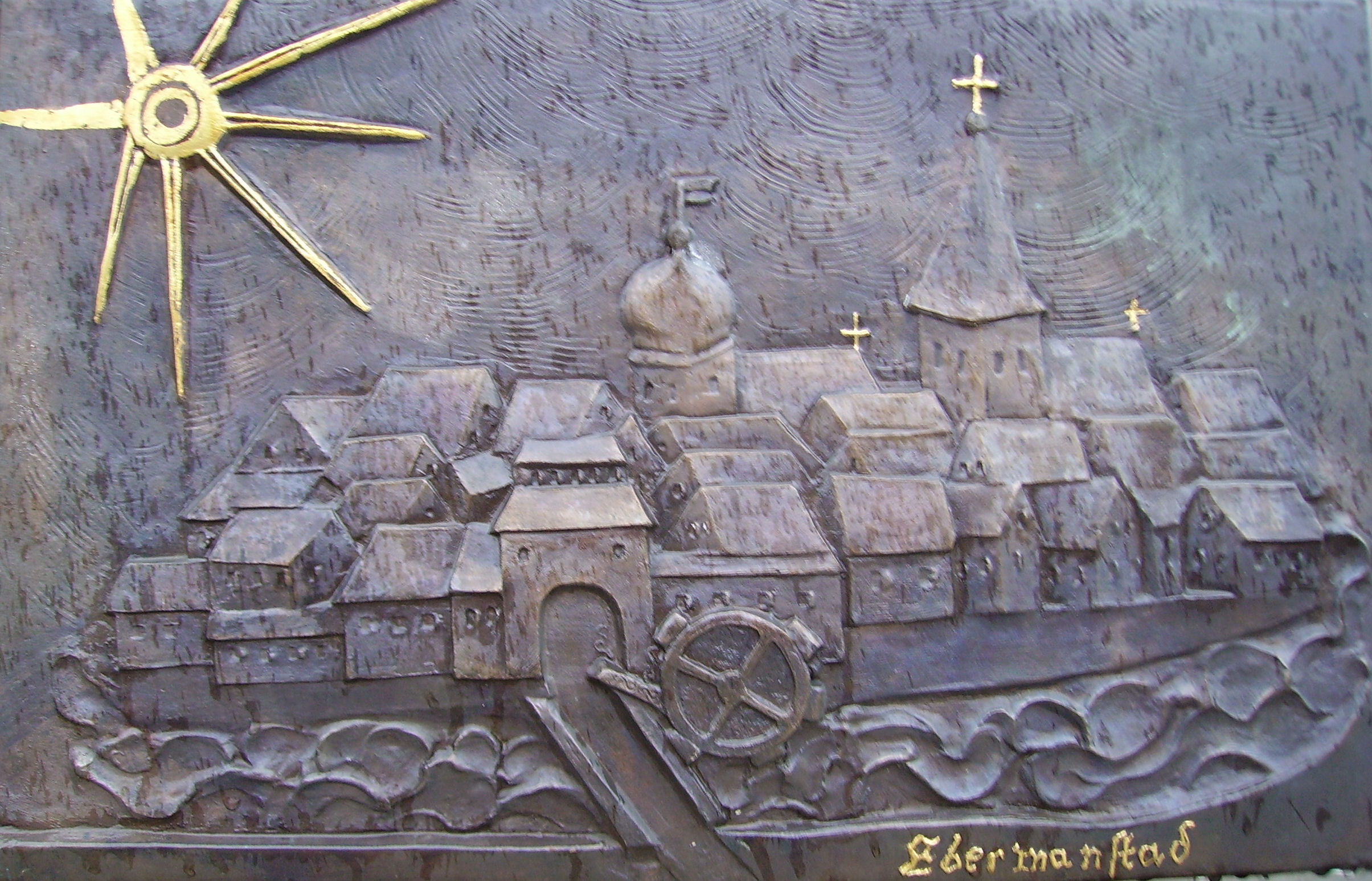
Relief

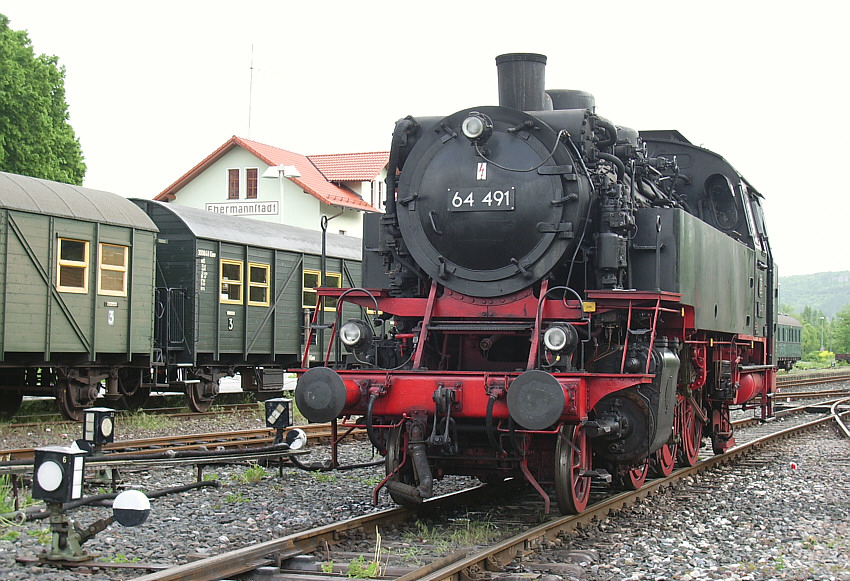
64 491 of the steam railroad, Dampfbahn Fränkische Schweiz, May 2006

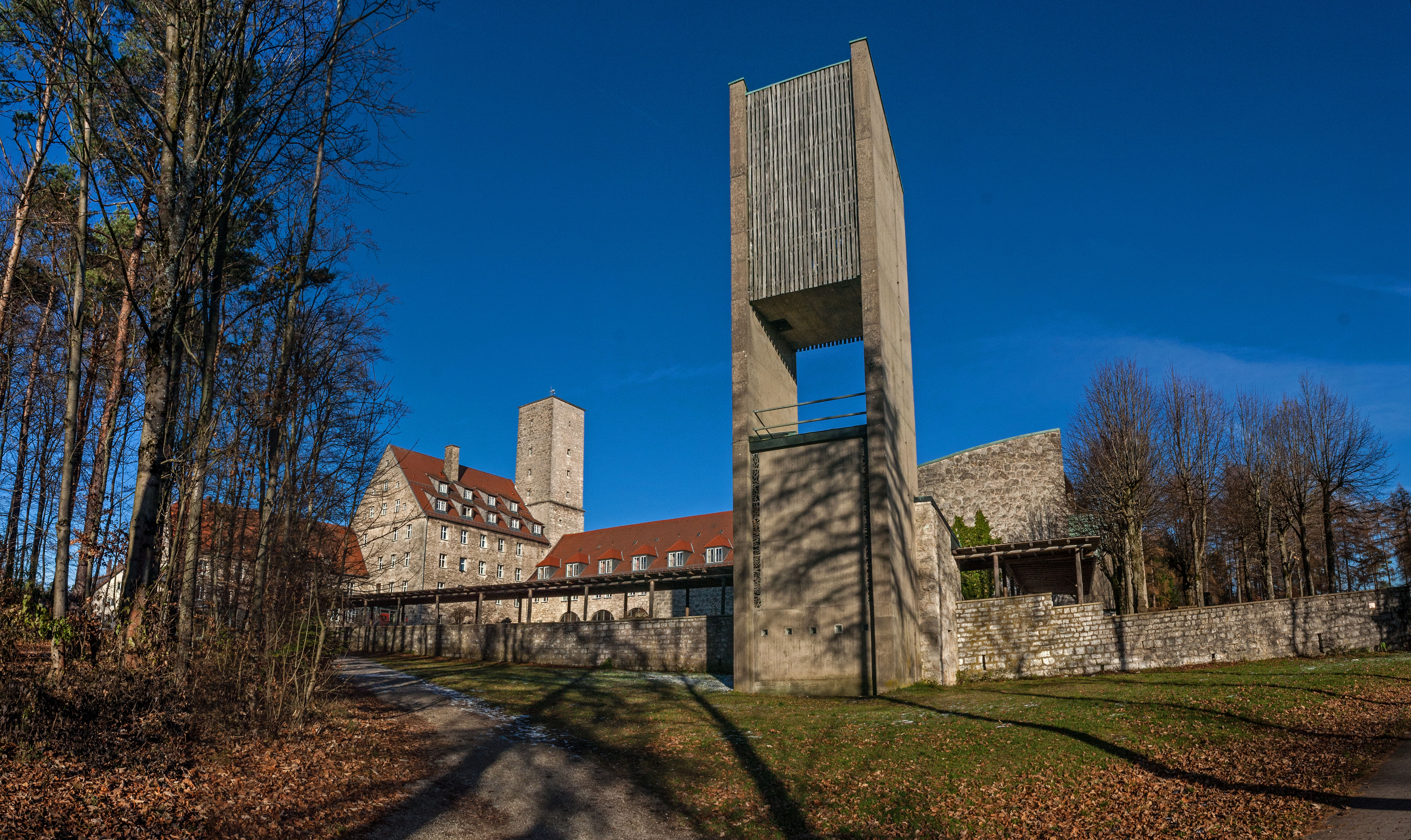
Castle "Burg Feuerstein", November 2013

=== Chronology ===
531 Thuringian foundation, Location of an "Ebermar"
981 First documented record of "Ebermarestad"; Ebermannstadt was part of St. Peter Monastery in Aschaffenburg
1194 Record of Thimo and Cunradus de Ebermarstatt
1200 The new owner of Ebermannstadt were the Schlüsselberg
1308 Record of a church in Ebermannstadt
1323 Ebermannstadt became market town during the reign of Louis IV
1349 Partitioning of the Schlüsselberg possessions
1390 Ebermannstadt is transferred to the Hochstift Bamberg
1430 Hussites burn down Ebermannstadt
1469 Ebermannstadt becomes an independent parish
1510 Beer war with Pretzfeld for the right to brew
1552 / 1553 Margrave Albrecht Alcibiades von Brandenburg-Kulmbach army destroys the town during the Second Margrave War
1633 The Swedish army occupies the town during the Thirty Years' War
1748 Birth of Friedrich Theiler
around 1750: Principal Frantz Melchior Freytag writes the "Ebermannstädter Liederhandschrift"
1756–1763 Quartering of Prussian soldiers during the Seven Years' War
1772 Birth of Johann Georg Lahner in Gasseldorf
1796 – 1815 Occupation by the French army during the French Revolutionary Wars
1803 Secularization, Ebermannstadt becomes part of Bavaria
1862 Foundation of the county of Ebermannstadt
1891 Inauguration of the railroad line between Forchheim and Ebermannstadt
1903 Electricity power station
1907 District hospital
1909 Flood
1915 Opening of the railroad line to Heiligenstadt
1922 Opening of the railroad line Gasseldorf – Muggendorf (later extended to Behringersmühle)
1922 – 1923 Construction of the water conduit
1939 Annexation of Breitenbach
1941 Feuerstein Castle was used as laboratory for high frequency engineering
1945 Local elections in Wohlmuthshüll
1952 Airport for gliders
1954 Construction of a Realschule
1960 Suspension of passenger traffic on the train line to Heiligenstadt
1961 Protestant Emmaus Church
1965 Outdoor swimming-pool
1970 Twin-city Chantonnay; flood
1970 – 1974 Construction of the Gymnasium Fränkische Schweiz (high school)
1971 Annexation of Gasseldorf and Niedermirsberg, Rüssenbach and Neuses-Poxstall
1972 Dissolution of the county of Ebermannstadt, Annexation of Wohlmuthshüll and Buckenreuth
1976 Suspension of train traffic between Ebermannstadt and Behringersmühle
1978 Annexation of Eschlipp and Kanndorf, Formation of the administrative collectivity Ebermannstadt
1979 Landslide near Eschlipp
1981 Ceremony "One Thousand Years of Ebermannstadt"; Inception of scheduled train traffic of the steam railroad as a tourist attraction
1994 Elevation to "Possible Middle Center"
1999 Observatory Feuerstein

== Tourism ==
Ebermannstadt is a state-approved resort town with an open-air swimming pool, campground in the district of Rothenbühl, golf course in the district of Kanndorf and a sport airfield on top of the Feuerstein.

During clear nights, there are guided tours at the Observatory Feuerstein.

== Sights ==
There is a small war memorial chapel on the edge of the town.

=== Buildings ===
The most important sacred buildings of the town are the Maria Chapel and the neoroman Nicholas Church. Old Franconian timbered buildings are located near the market place with Maria Well. Landmark of the town is the scoop wheel from 1606 on the Wiesent. Feuerstein Castle, which was built only in 1941 in the style of Franconian castles, stands out above the town. During the Second World War it was the development centre for the Luftwaffe's "Wurzburg" radar system.

== Economy ==
The largest companies in Ebermannstadt are

- Kennametal
- Vierling

== Personalities ==
- Kurt Albert (1954–2010) teacher, climber, photographer
