= Burgstall =

German term for a type of ruined castle

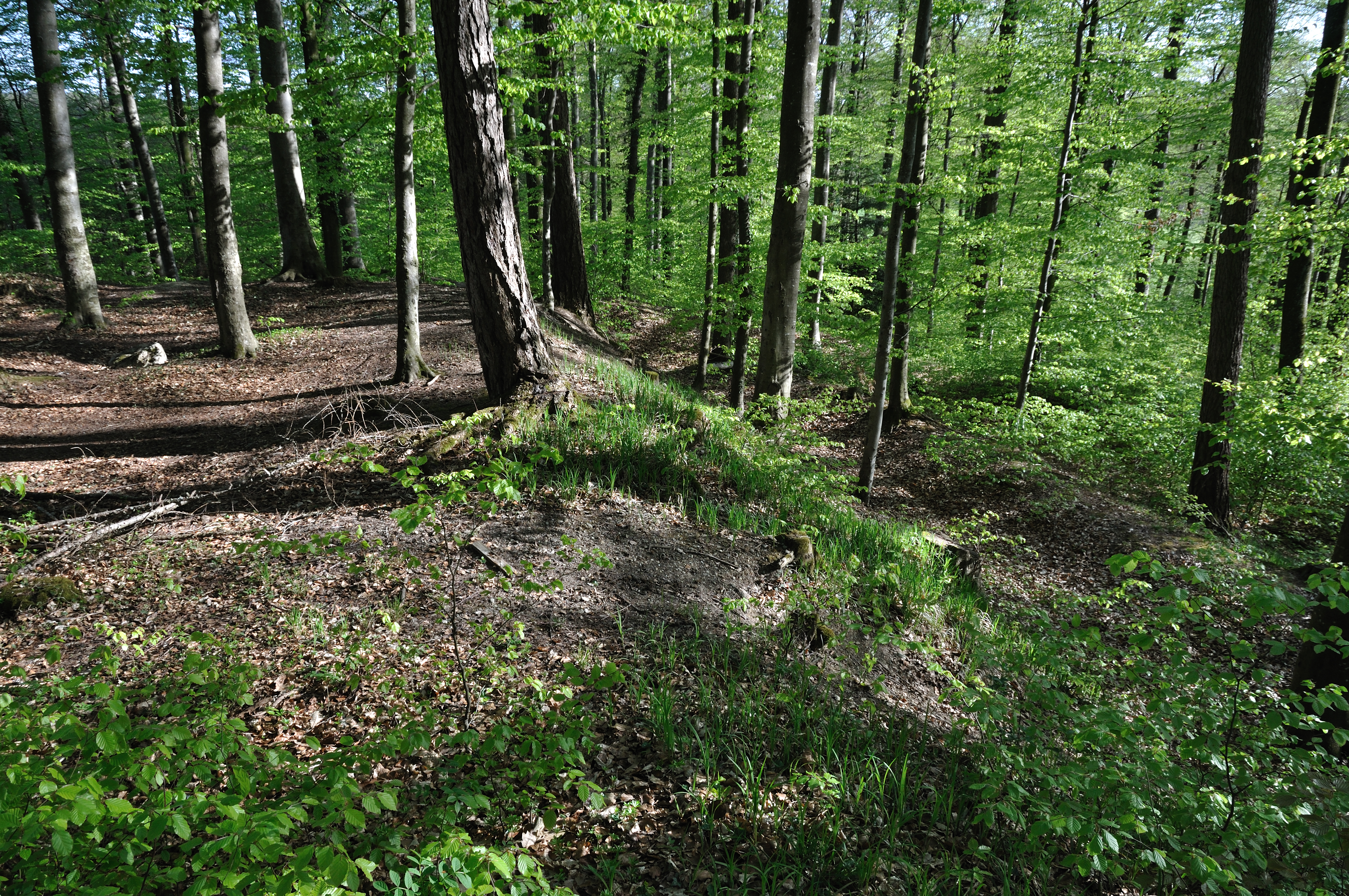
The Heidenschloss, a burgstall near Friedrichshafen, probably the "Old Castle" of the lords of Raderach

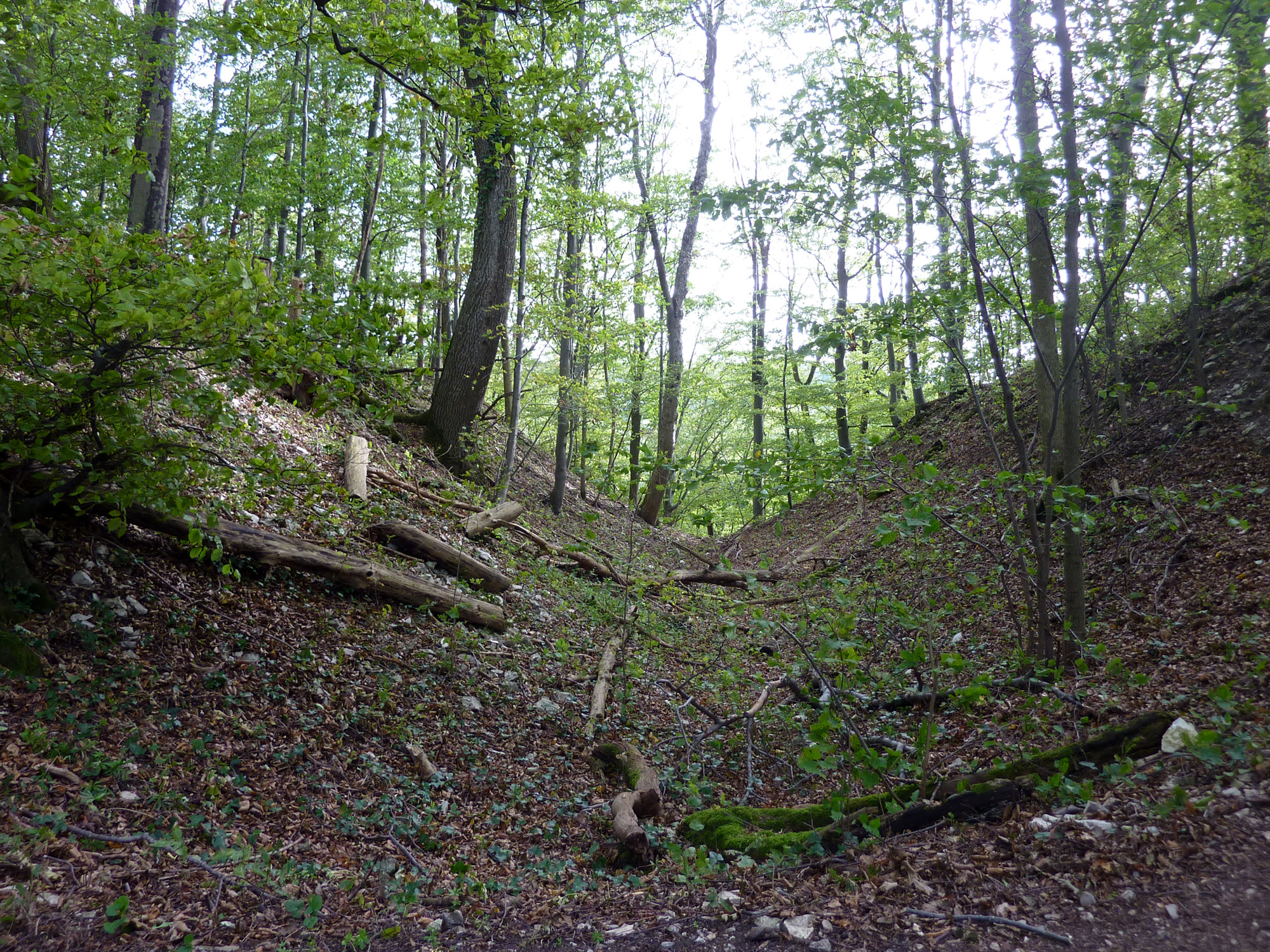
The Bertaburg on the spur of Landsöhr

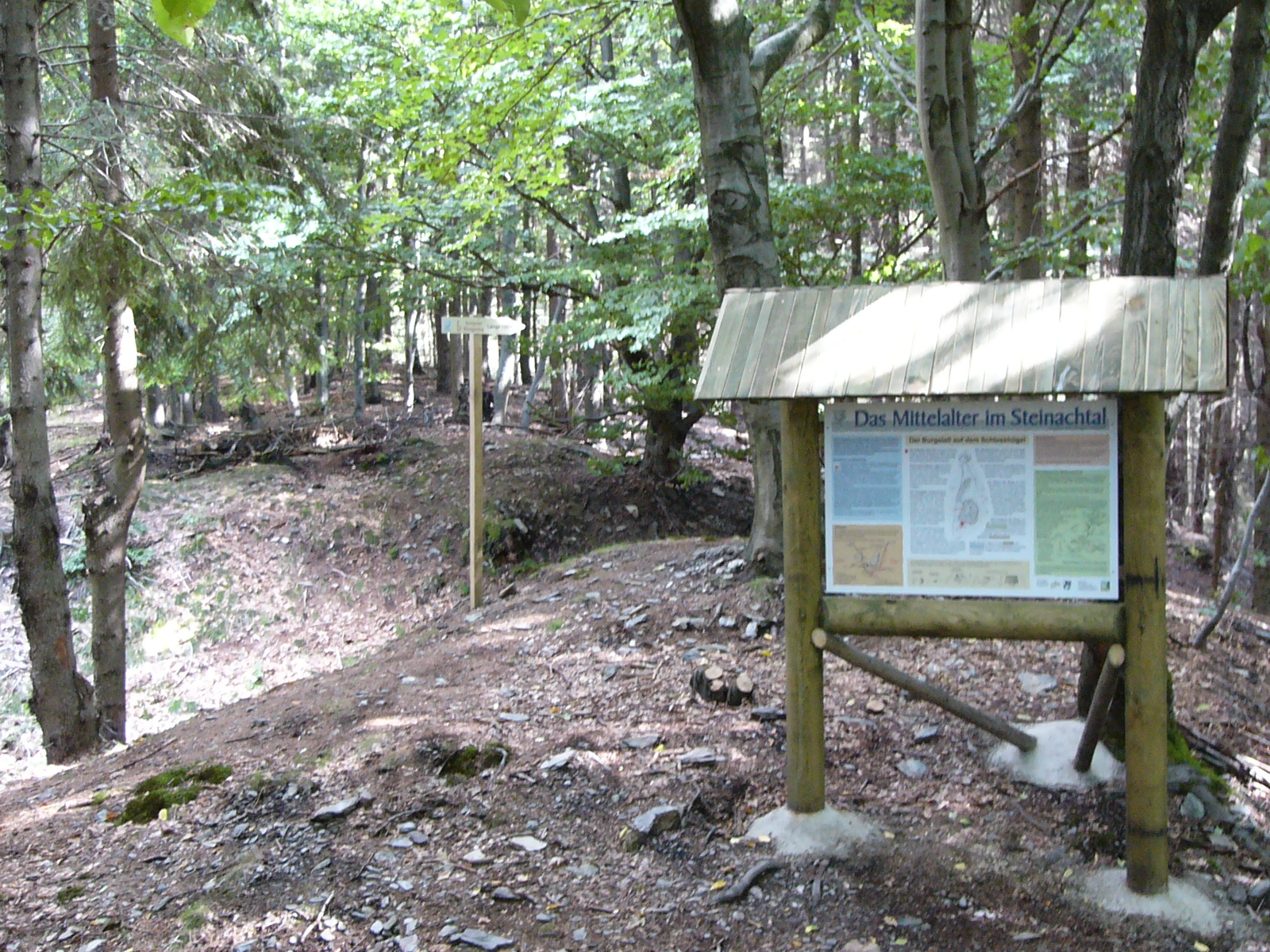
The Schlosshügel near Weidenberg (Franconia)

A burgstall (German pronunciation: [ˈbʊʁkˌʃtal]) is a German term referring to a castle of which so little is left that its appearance cannot effectively be reconstructed. It has no direct equivalent in English, but may be loosely translated as "castle site". Variations in the literature include Burgstelle, Altburgstelle, die Burgställe (plural), Burgstähl (archaic) or abgegangene Burg ("lost castle"). In German castle studies, a burgstall is a castle that has effectively been levelled, whereas a "ruin" (Ruine) still has recognisable remnants of the original castle above the level of the ground.

== Definitions ==
The word burgstall is of medieval origin and comes from Burg = "castle" and Stelle = "place" or "site" and originally just meant a castle, a castle hill or, later, a small castle. Today it refers to the purported site of a castle that has yet to be confirmed or to a place where a castle once stood, but whose walls have completely or largely been levelled.

Many castles that survive today only as burgställe were slighted in the Middle Ages or left to decay naturally after being attacked and destroyed. But many were also deliberately abandoned as a result, for example, of the roof tax in Austria. Local names often still refer to the fortifications that once stood on these sites and many of them still have visible piles of rubble or recognisable, albeit levelled, courtyards, because they usually occupy relatively inaccessible sites. However many were also used as a "quarry" for nearby buildings and have entirely disappeared. In some instances only the earthworks remain visible above the ground – features such as ditches and ramparts. The result is that burgställe are often only recognisable as uneven terrain and some are only visible in aerial photographs. Today most are protected as heritage monuments.

Usage of burgstall in comparison with a ruin or castle:

- Castle (German: Burg): a fortified complex of buildings with a defensive character, an enceinte and a residential area.
- Castle ruin (German: Burgruine): castle that is no longer habitable due to at least partial collapse or demolition. There are still some above-ground remains.
- Burgstall: site or faint remains of a castle where there are no significant above-ground remains and a reconstruction of the building plan and functions of the buildings is no longer possible. Even a ruin in which remnants of the foundation walls enable some sort of reconstruction, is not considered much more than a burgstall in the technical castle literature.
- Lost castle (German: abgegangene Burg or abgekommene Burg, lit. gone or lost castle): a "lost" castle is one where there are no traces left, which is common in the case of hillside or spur castles, where erosion and landslides have cleared them away. The term also covers castles whose exact historical location is unknown.

A large number of castles have not survived in their original form but have simply been incorporated into a later structure, such as an early modern fortress or later modern schloss, where they form elements such as individual wings (often parts of the inner bailey), buildings or part of the fortifications or are simply used for the foundations of newer buildings or creation of garden terraces.

== Examples ==
=== Czech Republic ===
- Burgstall, a hill in South Moravia, former site of a Roman military settlement

=== Germany ===
- Altraderach Castle, Raderach, Baden-Württemberg
- Blankenburg Castle, Essel, Lower Saxony
- Blankenhagen Castle, Grethem, Lower Saxony
- Landsöhr Castle, Bad Boll, Baden-Württemberg
- Burgstall Schlosshügel, Weidenberg, Bavaria
- Uhlenburg, Essel, Lower Saxony
- Üsenberg Castle, Breisgau-Hochschwarzwald, Baden-Württemberg

=== Lithuania ===
- Klaipėda Castle, Klaipėda

=== Netherlands ===
- Bredevoort Castle, Bredevoort, Guelders

== Places incorporating the name ==
There are numerous villages in Germany and Austria with the name Burgstall, presumably named after a castle site of this nature. Examples include:

=== Germany ===
- Burgstall, Saxony-Anhalt a gemeinde in the Börde district in Saxony-Anhalt.
- Burgstall an der Murr, part of the gemeinde of Burgstetten in Baden-Württemberg

=== Italy ===
- Burgstall, South Tyrol, a municipality in South Tyrol

== Literature ==
- Horst Wolfgang Böhme, Reinhard Friedrich, Barbara Schock-Werner (ed.): Wörterbuch der Burgen, Schlösser und Festungen. Reclam, Stuttgart, 2004, ISBN 3-15-010547-1, pp. 102/103.
