= Streitburg Castle =

Castle in Germany

- Burg Streitberg
- Wiesenttal-Streitberg
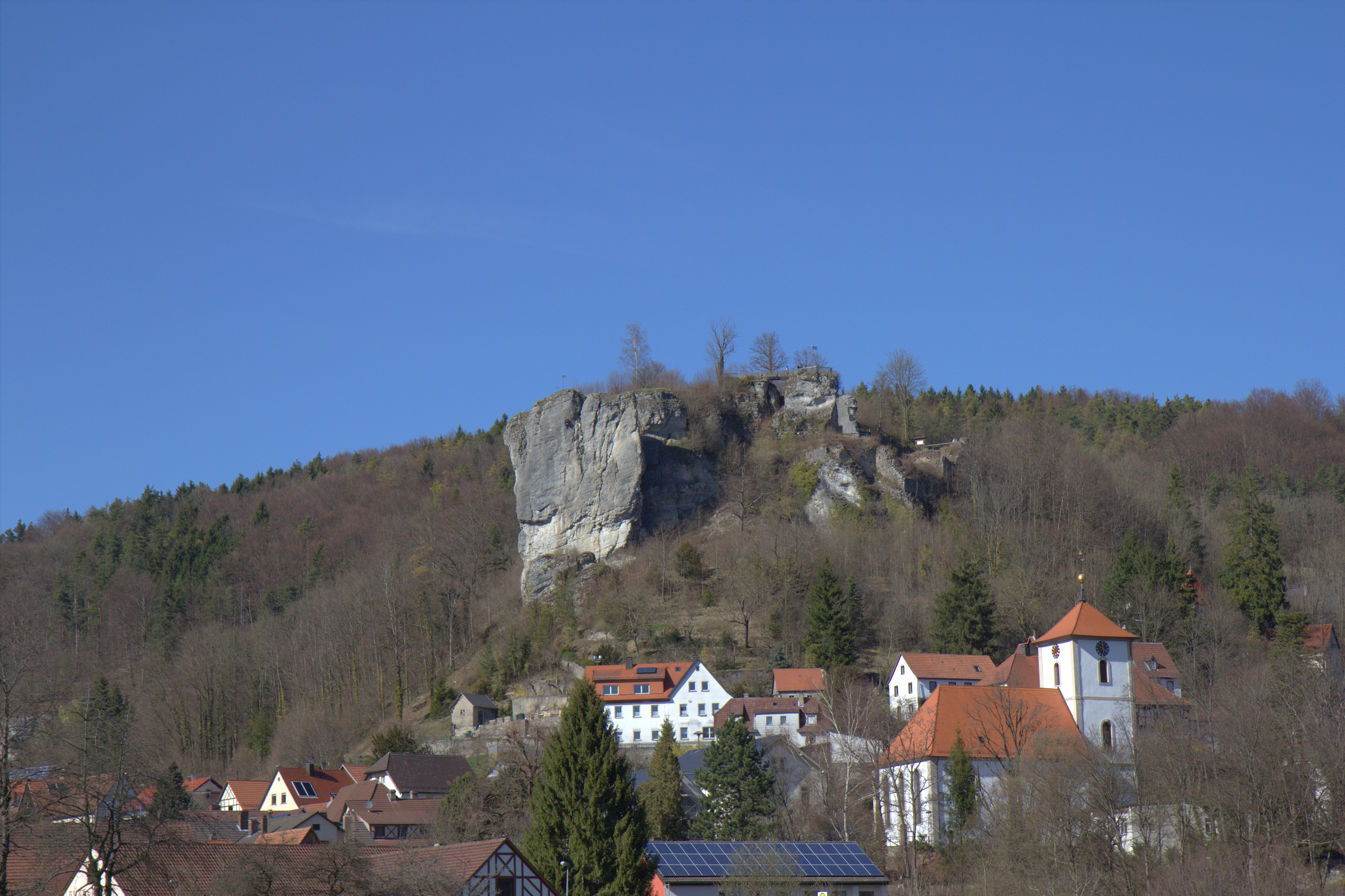
- The ruins of Streitberg Castle seen from the south

Site information
- Type: hill castle, spur castle
- Code: DE-BY
- Condition: restored ruins, of which not very much of the structure has survived

Location
- Coordinates: 49°48′46″N 11°13′14″E
- Height: 403.7 m above sea level (NN)

Site history
- Built: before 1120
- Materials: rubble stone walls

Garrison information
- Occupants: ministeriales castle

The ruins of Streitburg Castle (German: Burgruine Streitburg or Streitberg Castle (Burgruine Streitberg) are the remains of a high mediaeval aristocratic castle above the village of Streitberg, in the market borough of Wiesenttal in the Upper Franconian county of Forchheim in the German state of Bavaria. They lie directly opposite the ruins of Neideck Castle, the symbol of Franconian Switzerland, on the other side of the valley.

The ruins are freely accessible to the public.

== Location ==
The ruins of the spur castle are located at a height of 403.7 m above sea level (NN) on a rocky southwest-pointing hill, the Streitberg, above the eponymous village, which is bounded to the south and west by the Wiesent river and to the west by the valley of Schauertal.

The ruins may be reached on footpaths from the village or the surrounding area.

Near the ruins of Streitburg are other former castles: to the northeast is the burgstall of Kulk on the hill named Guckhüll, to the southeast is Neideck Castle and the former motte castle of Wöhr which is on a former river island of the Wiesent near the hamlet of the same name. About 250 metres southwest and above the Neideck is the site of Wartleiten Castle, in the area of the present cemetery in Niederfellendorf is a castle site of the Fellendorfs and on the Hummerstein above Gasseldorf an early mediaeval burgstall.

== Literature ==
- Ursula Pfistermeister: Wehrhaftes Franken – Band 3: Burgen, Kirchenburgen, Stadtmauern um Bamberg, Bayreuth und Coburg. Fachverlag Hans Carl GmbH, Nuremberg, 2002, ISBN 3-418-00387-7, pp. 119–120.
- Gustav Voit, Brigitte Kaulich, Walter Rüfer: Vom Land im Gebirg zur Fränkischen Schweiz – Eine Landschaft wird entdeckt. (Schriftenreihe des Fränkische-Schweiz-Vereins, Vol. 8) Verlag Palm und Enke, Erlangen, 1992, ISBN 3-7896-0511-5, pp. 145–156.
- Gustav Voit, Walter Rüfer: Eine Burgenreise durch die Fränkische Schweiz. Verlag Palm und Enke, Erlangen, 1991, ISBN 3-7896-0064-4, pp. 178–183.
- Björn-Uwe Abels, Joachim Zeune, et al.: Führer zu archäologischen Denkmälern in Deutschland, Band 20: Fränkische Schweiz. Konrad Theiss Verlag GmbH und Co., Stuttgart, 1990, ISBN 3-8062-0586-8, pp. 245–246.
- Hellmut Kunstmann: Die Burgen der südwestlichen Fränkischen Schweiz. Kommissionsverlag Degener und Co., Neustadt an der Aisch, 1990, pp. 58–87.
- Hans Vollet, Kathrin Heckel: Die Ruinenzeichnungen des Plassenburgkartographen Johann Christoph Stierlein. Kulmbach, 1987.
- Brigitte Kaulich, Gustav Voit, u.A.: Rund um die Neideck. Verlag Palm und Enke, Erlangen, 1983, ISBN 3-7896-0057-1, pp. 282–288.
- Karl Bosl: Handbuch der historischen Stätten Deutschlands Band VII. Stuttgart, 1981, ISBN 3-520-27703-4.
- Toni Eckert, Susanne Fischer, Renate Freitag, Rainer Hofmann, Walter Tausendpfund: Die Burgen der Fränkischen Schweiz: Ein Kulturführer. Gürtler Druck, Forchheim o.J., ISBN 3-9803276-5-5, pp. 143–147.
