= Franconian Switzerland =

Upland in the German state of Bavaria

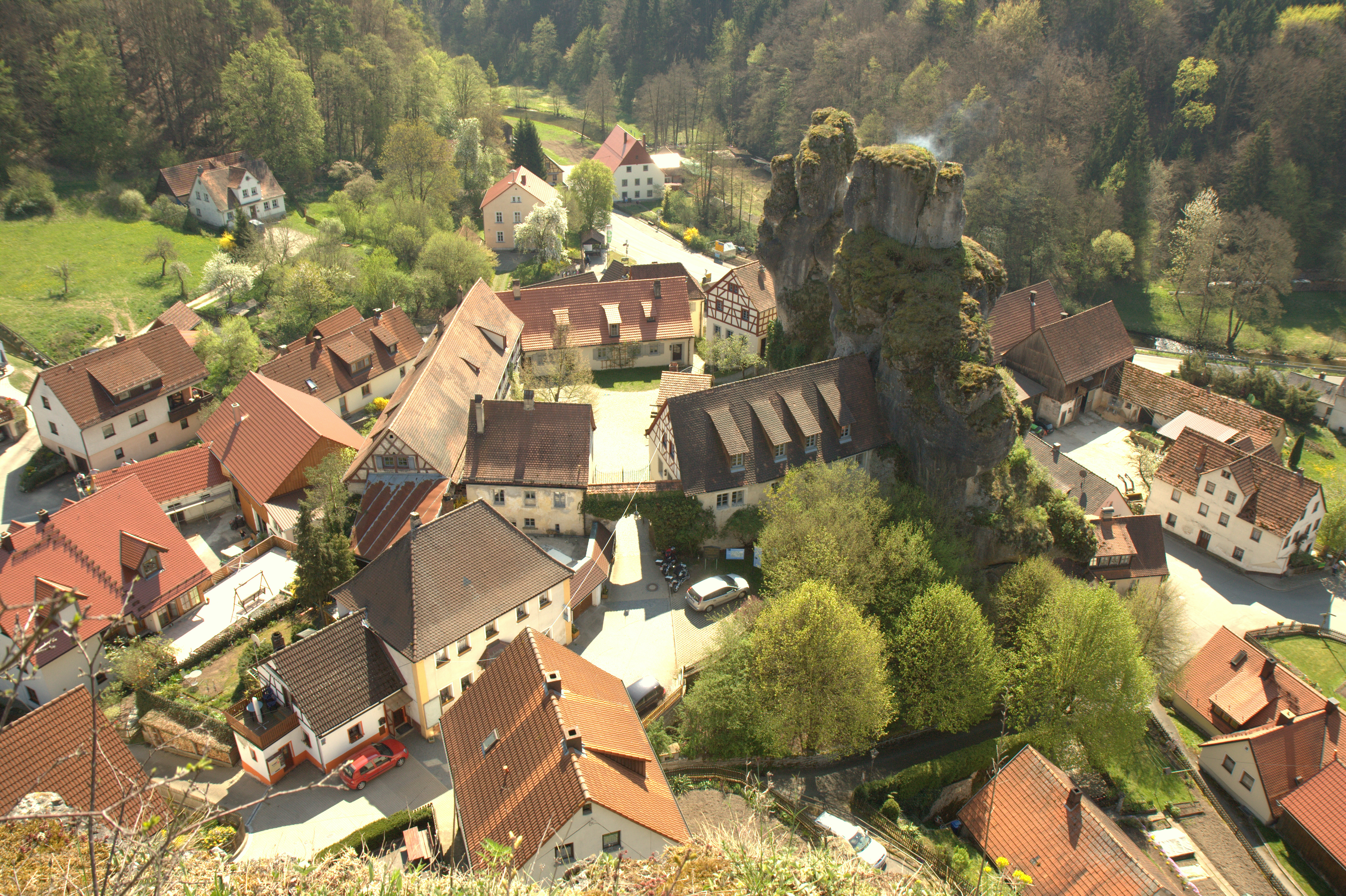
Tüchersfeld, a village in Franconian Switzerland

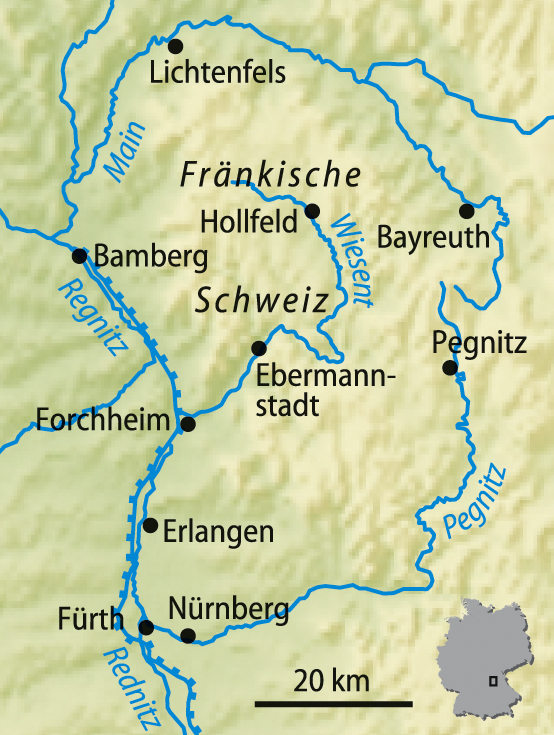
Franconian Switzerland

Franconian Switzerland (German: Fränkische Schweiz, pronounced [ˈfʁɛŋkɪʃə ˈʃvaɪts]) is an upland in Upper Franconia, Bavaria, Germany, and a popular tourist retreat. Located between the River Pegnitz in the east and the south, the River Regnitz in the west and the River Main in the north, its relief, which reaches 600 metres in height, forms the northern part of the Franconian Jura (Frankenjura). Like several other mountainous landscapes in the German-speaking lands, e.g. Holstein Switzerland, Märkische Schweiz, or Pommersche Schweiz, Franconian Switzerland was given its name by Romantic artists and poets in the 19th century who compared the landscape to Switzerland. Franconian Switzerland is famous for its high density of traditional breweries.

== Name ==
The region was once called Muggendorfer Gebürg (Muggendorf hills). The first tourists arrived during the age of Romanticism. Two law students of Erlangen University, Ludwig Tieck and Wilhelm Heinrich Wackenroder have been credited as "discoverers" of the region. The "Eine Reise in die Fränkische Schweiz" issue of their joint production Franz Sternbalds Wanderungen (Berlin, 1798) enthralled many contemporaries.

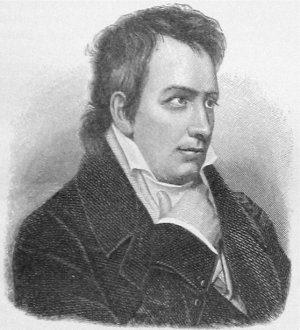
Ludwig Tieck, who publicized the region.

The 1820 book Die kleine Schweiz (Little Switzerland), written by Jakob Reiselsberger of Waischenfeld, gave the region its name. In 1829, a book by German salesman and local historian Joseph Heller, Muggendorf und seine Umgebung oder die Fränkische Schweiz (Muggendorf and its surroundings or Franconian Switzerland), was published.

The description Switzerland was common during the 19th century for landscapes with mountains, valleys and, most significantly, rocks, e.g., Saxon Switzerland, Marcher Switzerland, Mecklenburg Switzerland and Holstein Switzerland.

== Geography ==
Franconian Switzerland is the northern part of the Franconian Jura. It is often loosely defined as the region bounded by the Main to the north, Regnitz to the west and Pegnitz to the east, or by the A 70 motorway to the north, the A 9 to the east and the A 73 to the west. However, the actual region of Franconian Switzerland is only the catchment area of the River Wiesent.

The region covers parts of the counties of Bamberg, Bayreuth and Forchheim. Its best known settlements include Pottenstein, Gößweinstein, Muggendorf, Ebermannstadt, Streitberg, Egloffstein, and Waischenfeld.

Its boundaries are Obermainland (north), Erlangen (south), Bayreuth (east), Forchheim (west), and Bamberg (northwest).

Information about Franconian Switzerland may be found in the Franconian Switzerland Museum in Tüchersfeld with its comprehensive regional collections. It is housed in the so-called Jew's Court (Judenhof), below two steep rock pinnacles.

=== Franconian Switzerland Trade Association ===
The following 18 municipalities across 2 counties belong to the Franconian Switzerland Trade Association (Wirtschaftsverband Fränkische Schweiz):

- County of Bayreuth:
  - Ahorntal
  - Betzenstein
  - Creußen
  - Gesees
  - Haag
  - Hummeltal
  - Pegnitz
  - Plech
  - Pottenstein
  - Prebitz
  - Schnabelwaid
- County of Forchheim:
  - Egloffstein
  - Gößweinstein
  - Gräfenberg
  - Hiltpoltstein
  - Igensdorf
  - Obertrubach
  - Weißenohe

=== Geology ===
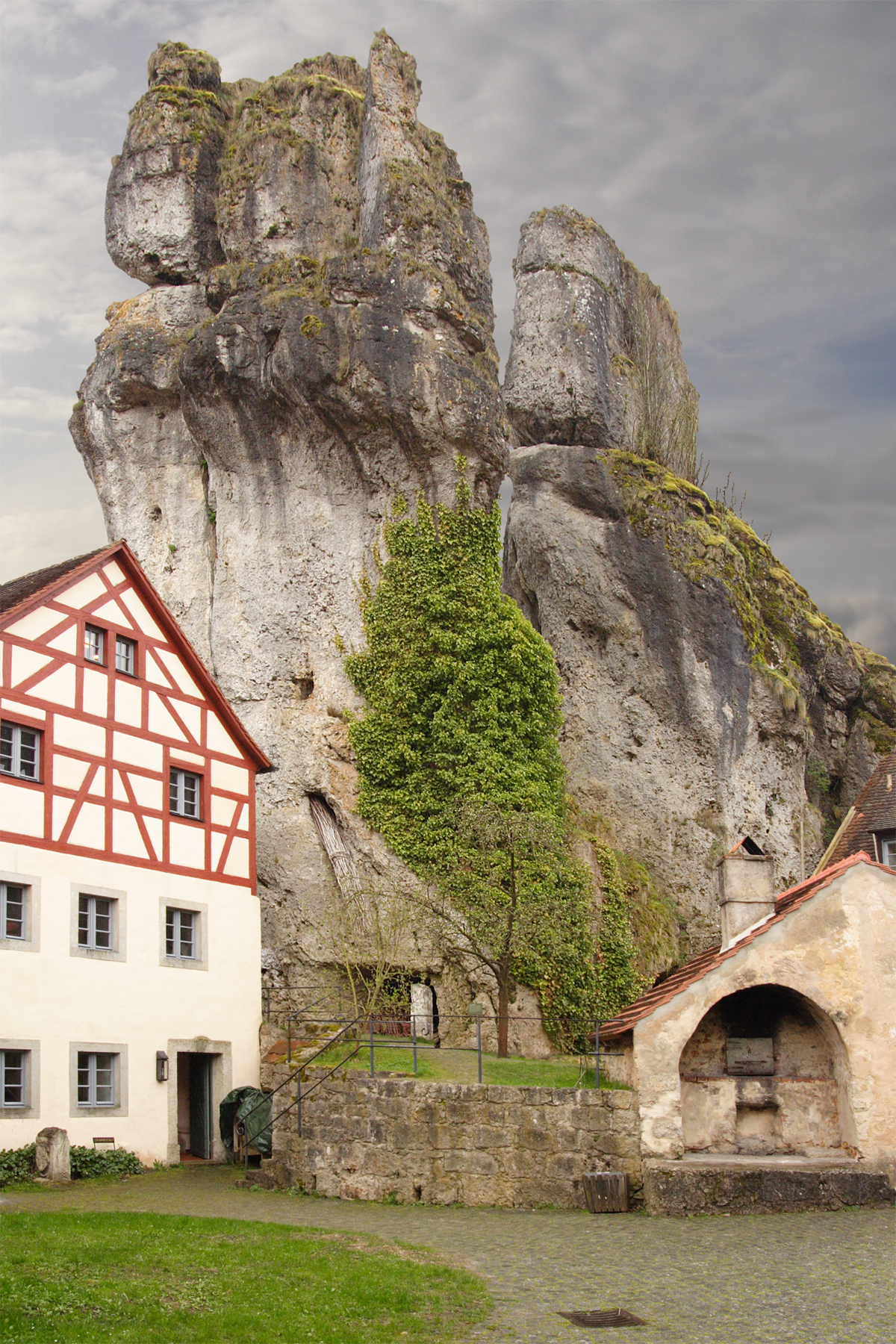
Tower karst rocks in Tüchersfeld, 2008

In the White Jurassic period, about 161 million to 150 million years ago, a shallow sea lay across southern Germany. During this period, thick rock sequences were deposited on the seabed as the Earth's crust continued to sink. The limestone and dolomite rocks that formed during this time period, along with the deeply incised river valleys and dry, arid plateaus, characterize this karst landscape. Many fossils, most typically ammonites, may be found in the limestone strata.

In the late Jurassic period, the sea receded with the shifting of European continental plate, allowing larger areas of land to emerge and form at the beginning of the Cretaceous period. During this time, the region had a tropical climate, and limestone and dolomite rocks underwent intense weathering. During the Cretaceous, a sea once again covered much of the region.

In the Tertiary period, the sea receded a second time, partially exposing the Jurassic landscape.

=== Mountains and hills ===
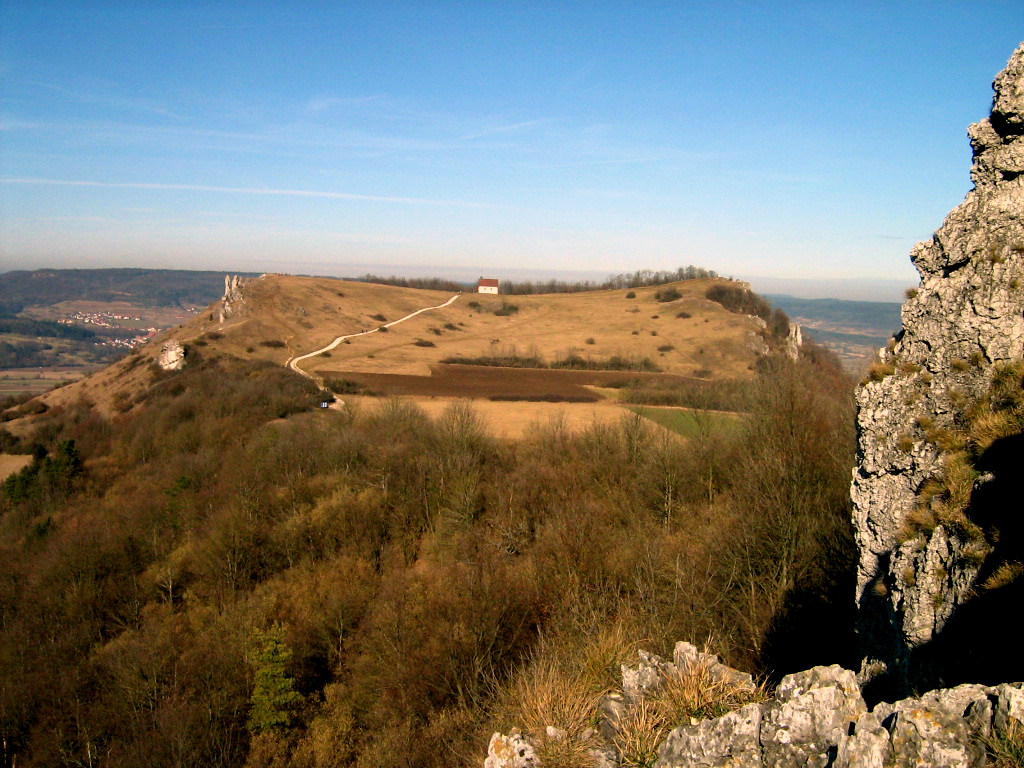
The double-peaked Ehrenbürg

The most prominent peak in this region is the Ehrenbürg, commonly known as Walberla, a table hill east of Forchheim. It consists of two peaks, the Rodenstein (532 m) and the Walberla (512 m). On the hilltop is its namesake, the small Walburgis Chapel, first mentioned in a 1360 manuscript. There is an annual festival on the hilltop on 30 April, the birthday of Saint Walburga, which attracts thousands of people.

Other popular peaks:

- Leienfels (near Pottenstein), 590 m
- Spiegelfels along with the Pfarrfelsen near Affalterthal, Markt Egloffstein, 468 m
- Wichsenstein (near Gössweinstein), 587 m
- Signalstein (near Wolfsberg, Obertrubach), 582 m
- Little Kulm (near Körbeldorf), 623 m
- Hohenmirsberger Plateau (near Pottenstein), 614 m
- Neubürg (near Wohnsgehaig), 587 m
- Tannenberg, 599 m
- Graubühl (near Creussen), 569 m

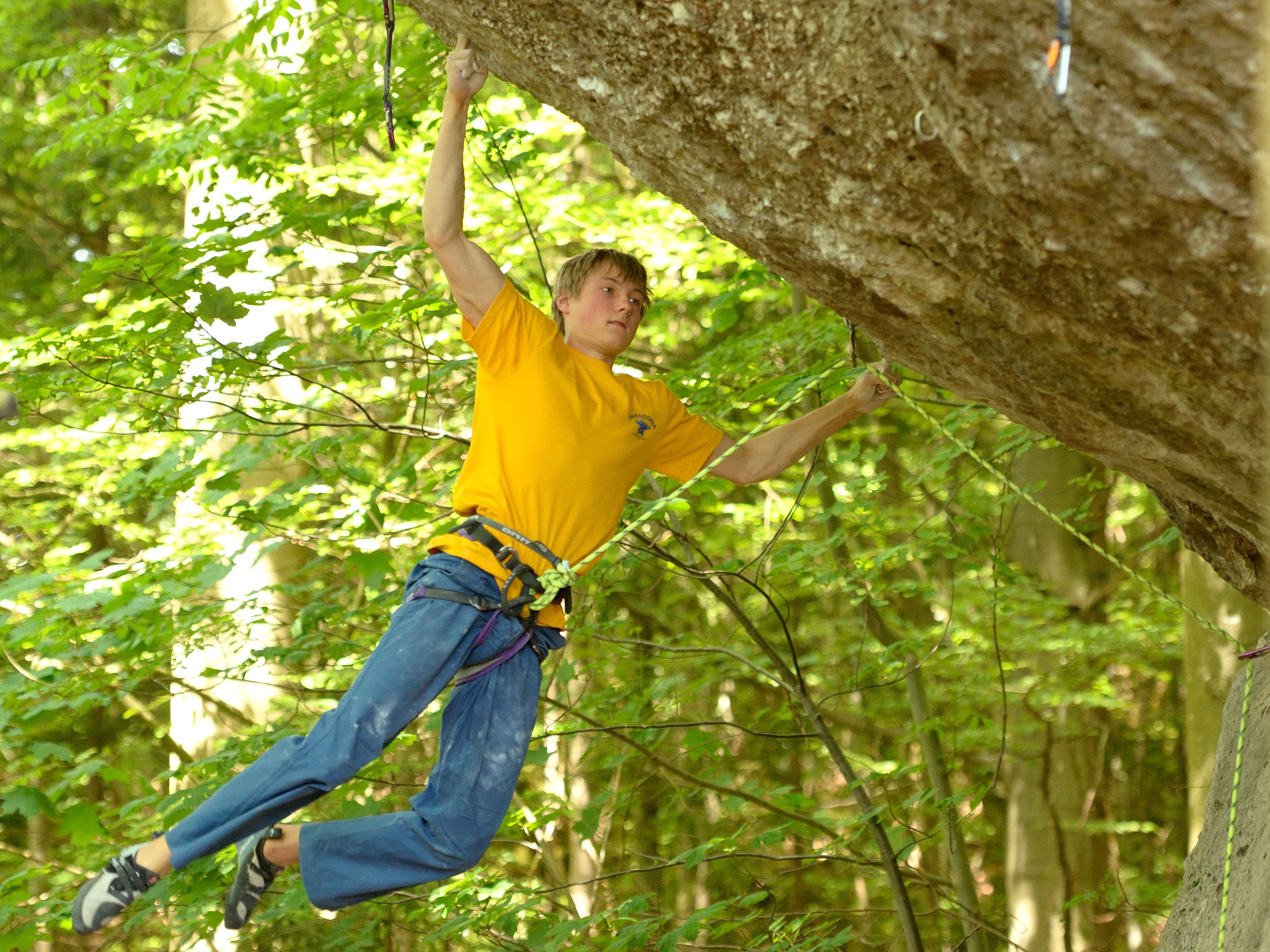
German rock climber Alexander Megos at Action Directe

The rocks of Franconian Switzerland's mountains and hills are popular for rock climbing. With more than 6,500 routes, it is one of the best developed climbing areas in the world.

Important climbing areas:

- Trubach Valley
- Walberla
- Wiesent Valley
- Leinleiter Valley
- Püttlach Valley
- Aufseß Valley

=== Caves ===
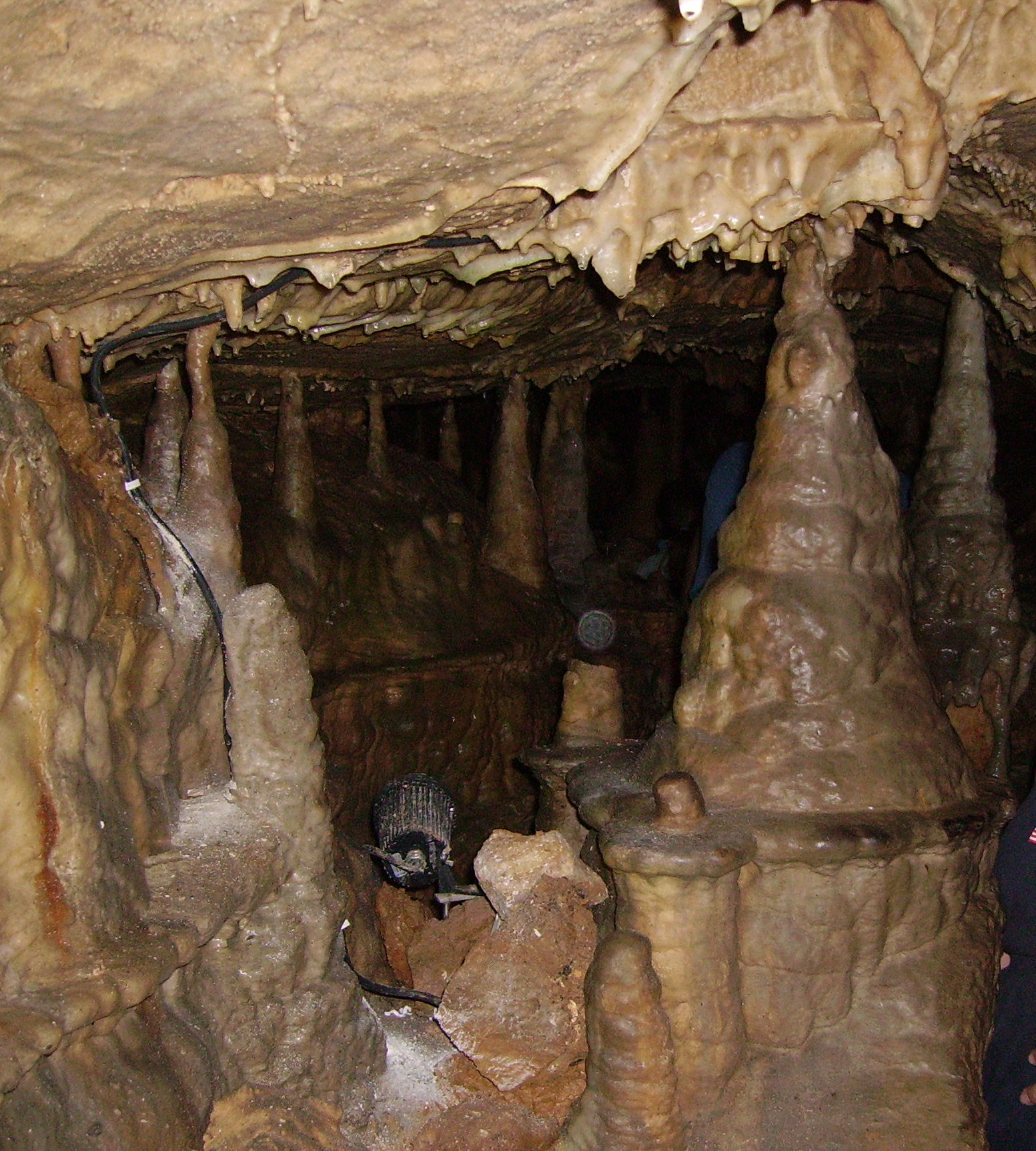
Stalagmite in the Binghöhle

There are countless caves in Franconian Switzerland, of which the Devil's Cave (Teufelshöhle) near Pottenstein is the most famous. The region is an example of karst topography.

Accessible caves:

- Binghöhle (near Streitberg)
- Teufelshöhle (near Pottenstein)
- Sophienhöhle (in the Ailsbach valley)
- Oswaldhöhle (near Muggendorf)
- Rosenmüllershöhle (near Muggendorf)
- Quackenschloss (near Engelhardsberg), cave ruin
- Zoolithenhöhle (near Burggailenreuth)
- Esperhöhle (near Gössweinstein)
- Förstershöhle (in the Zeubach valley)
- Schönsteinhöhle (in the Long Valley)
- Klauskirche (near Betzenstein)
- Riesenburg (near Doos)
- Hasenlochhöhle (near Pottenstein), known for having housed people during the Stone Age.

=== Castles ===
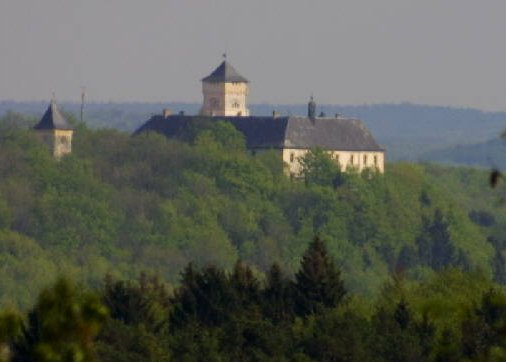
Greifenstein Palace

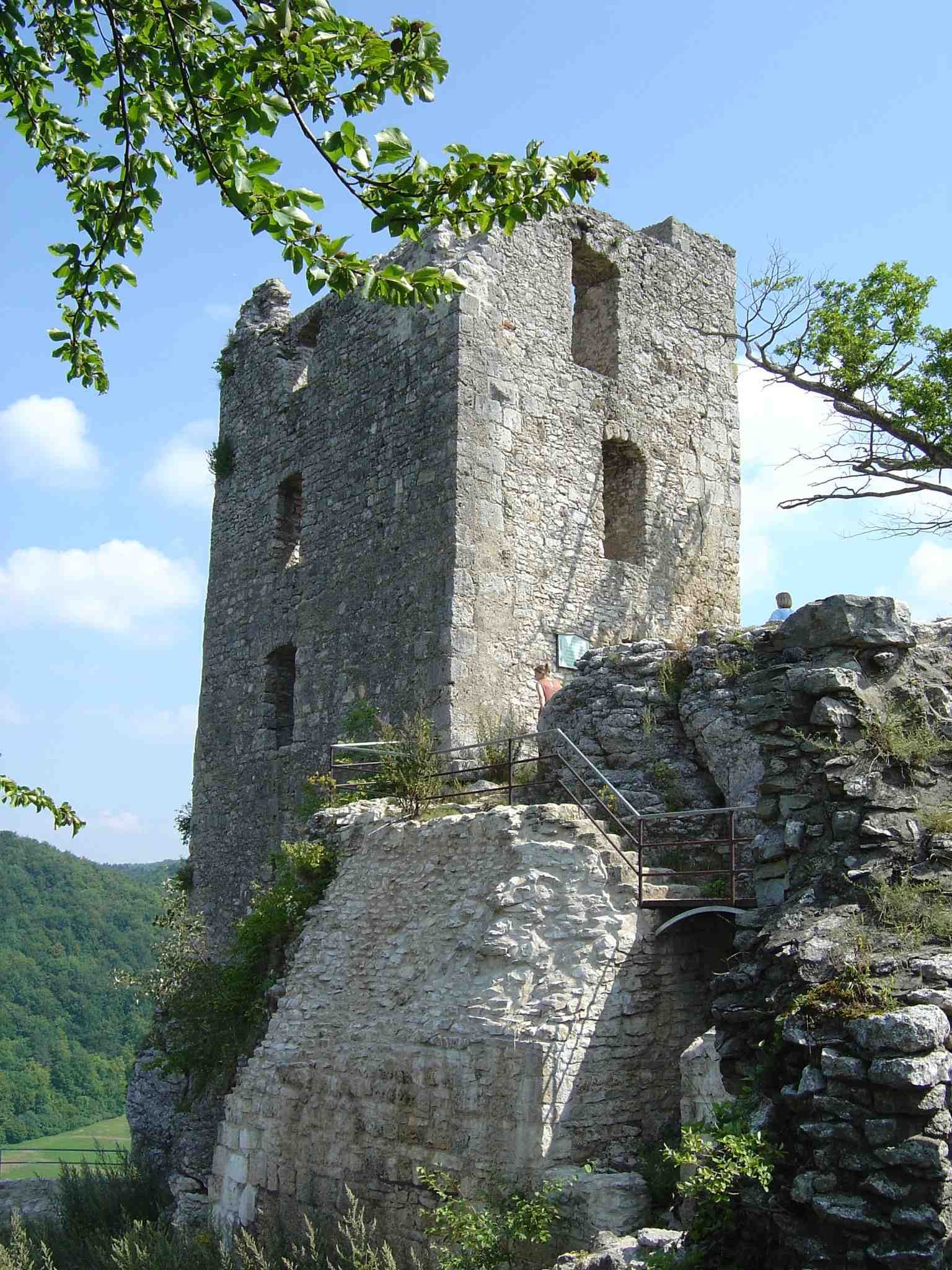
The ruins of Neideck Castle

Franconian Switzerland is located along the so-called Castle Road (Burgenstraße), which connects more than 70 castles, palaces, and fortresses between Mannheim and Prague. Most of these castles were constructed in the Middle Ages.

The following castles and castle ruins can be visited:

- Egloffstein Castle
- Gössweinstein Castle
- Schloss Greifenstein, seat of the Stauffenberg family.
- Rabeneck Castle
- Rabenstein Castle
- Pottenstein Castle
- Unteraufseß Castle
- Waischenfeld Castle
- Bärnfels Castle ruins
- Hollenberg Castle ruins
- Leienfels Castle ruins
- Neideck Castle ruins
- Neidenstein Castle ruins
- Streitburg Castle ruins (Markt Wiesenttal)
- Stierberg Castle ruins
- Wildenfels Castle ruins
- Wolfsberg Castle ruins

== Customs ==
The Osterbrunnen tradition has its origins in Franconian Switzerland. Around Easter, fountains and public wells are elaborately decorated. During the early modern period, this tradition became more obscure. However, it was renewed in the 1980s, and in 1986, 169 villages resumed the Osterbrunnen tradition. Today, more than 200 villages decorate their village wells and fountains with colourful Easter eggs. This custom likely emerged as celebration of water, a precious resource in the arid high plateau of Franconian Switzerland. The Bieberbach Osterbrunnen (Egloffstein) hold the Guinness World Record for the largest Osterbrunnen.

== Tourism ==
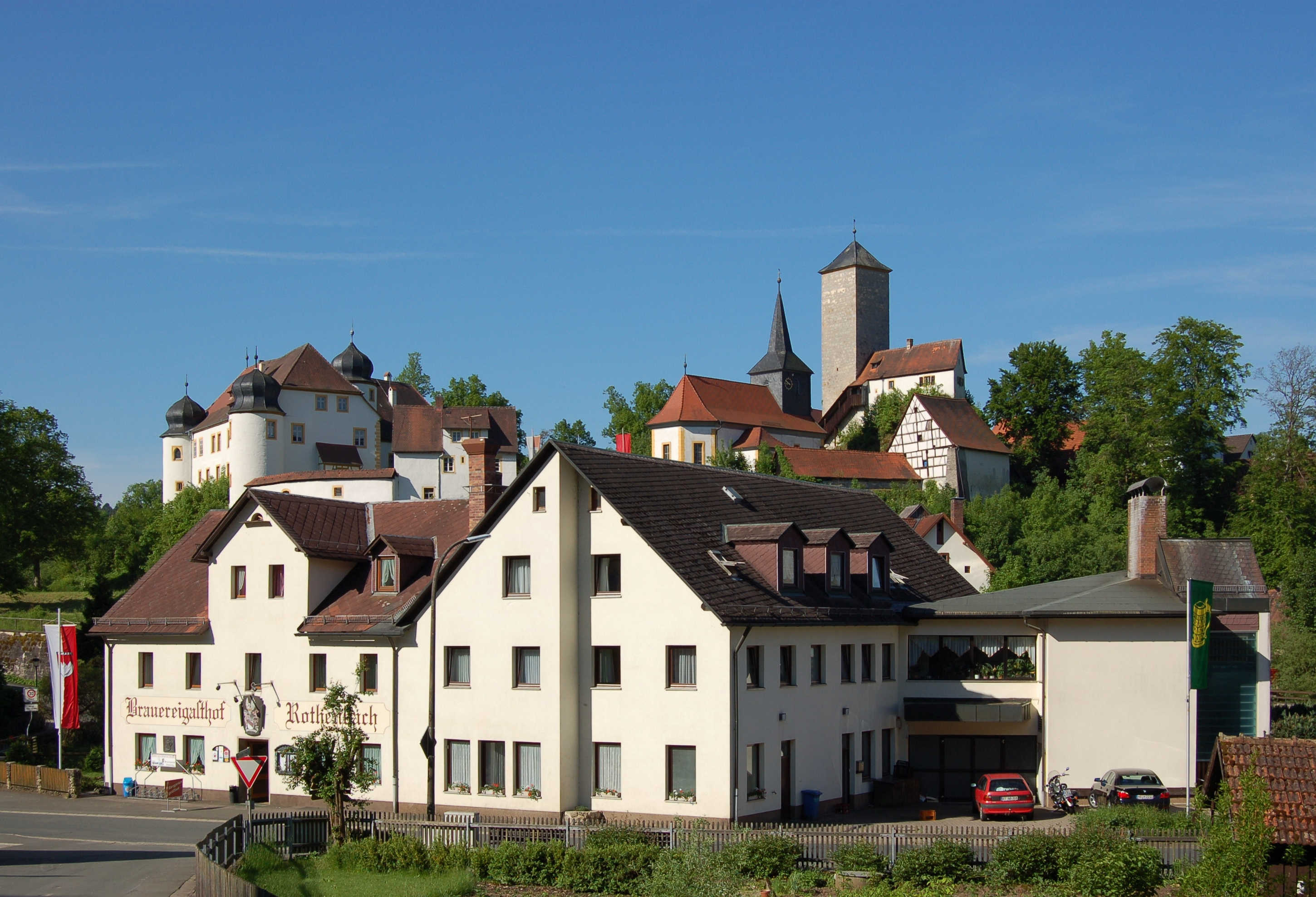
Franconian Switzerland has the highest density of breweries in the world: Brewery/pub in Aufseß

Franconian Switzerland is one of the oldest tourist regions in Germany. The region's numerous caves began attracting visitors at the beginning of the 19th century.

The region offers locals and visitors alike a variety of outdoors activities. Along with its countless hiking paths, the area is known for rock climbing and canoeing.

Home to the annual Franconian Switzerland Marathon, beginning in Forchheim, slowly climbing to Sachsenmühle-Wende, and then descending to Ebermannstadt, the area includes 375 km of trails for running, Nordic walking, and rambling in Germany, which are maintained by the European community-funded Running Experience Project, founded in July 2011.

The Franconian Switzerland Steam Railway (Dampfbahn Fränkische Schweiz) or DFS, is a museum railway in Ebermannstadt that operates steam and diesel specials on Sundays and on public holidays.

== Gallery ==
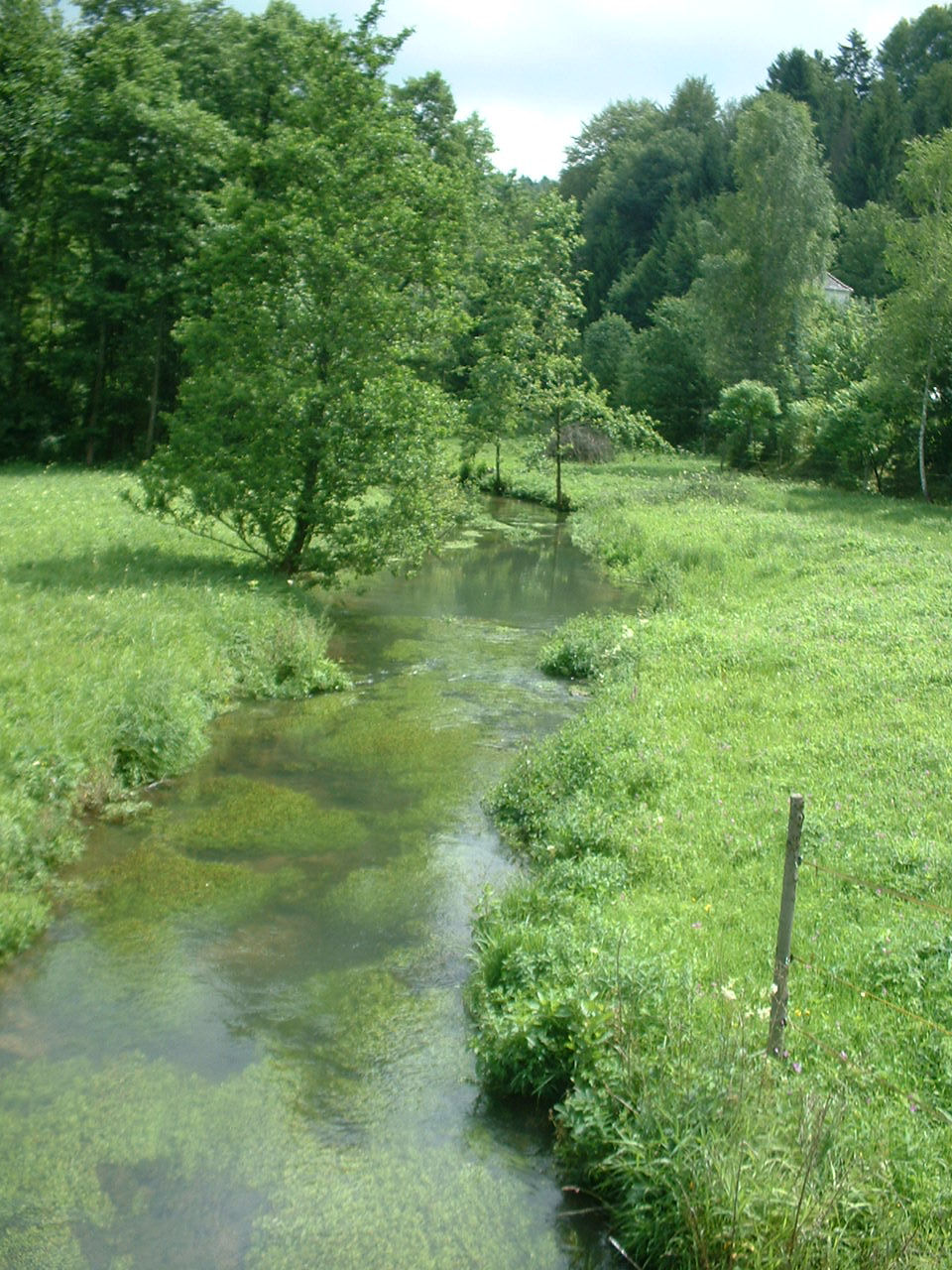
Aufseß river

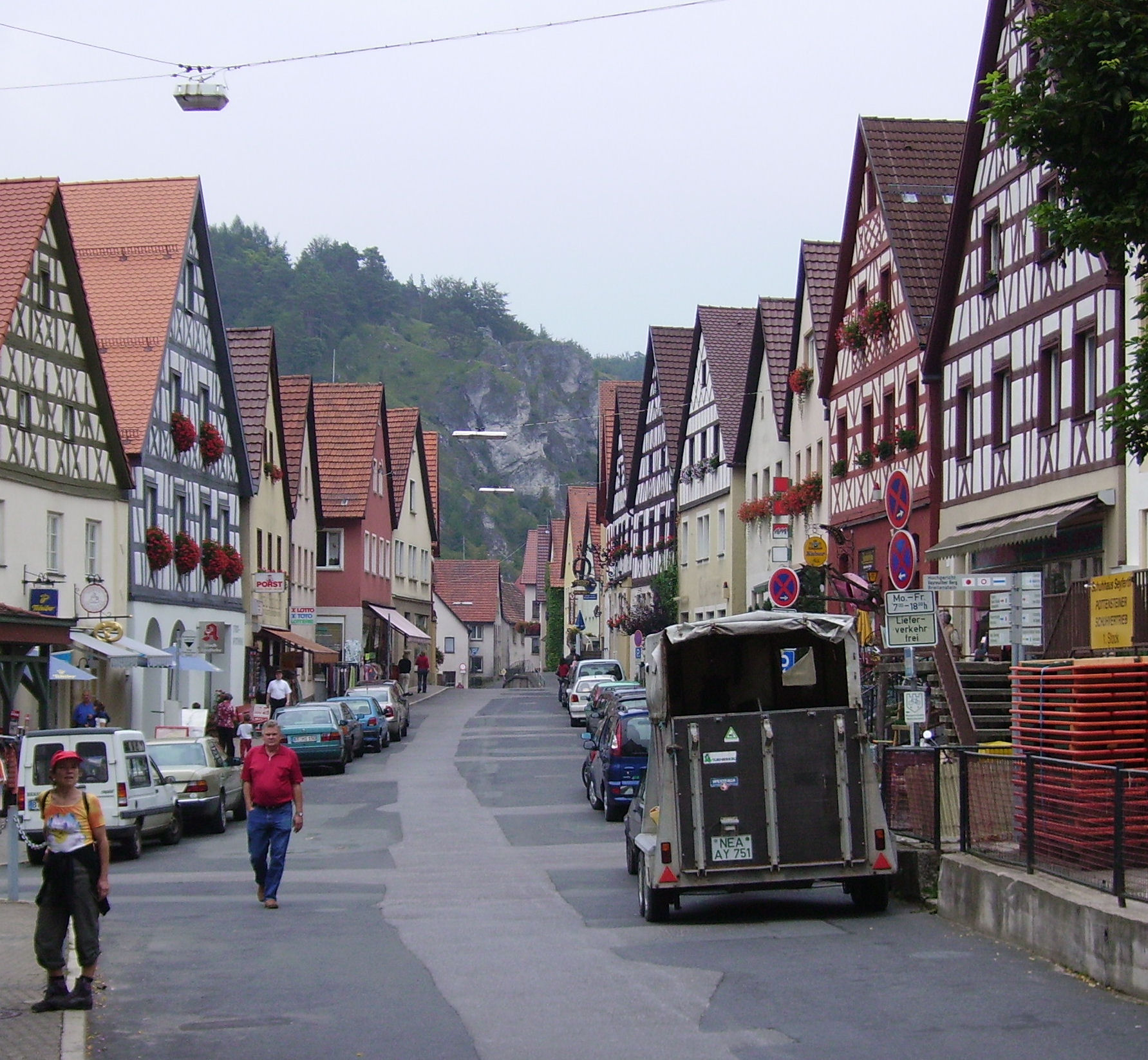
Pottenstein

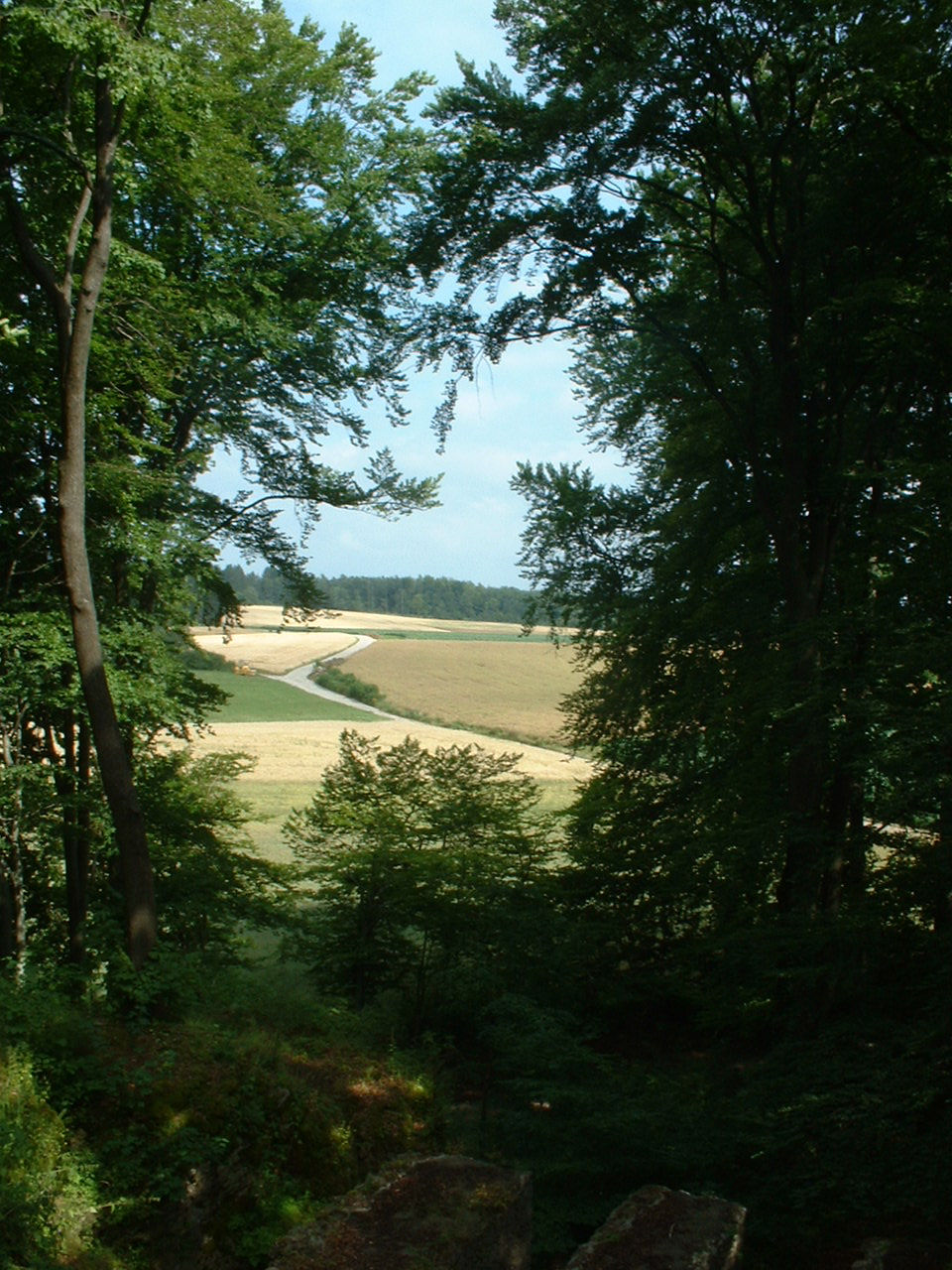
Landscape in the north: Sanspareil, Wonsees

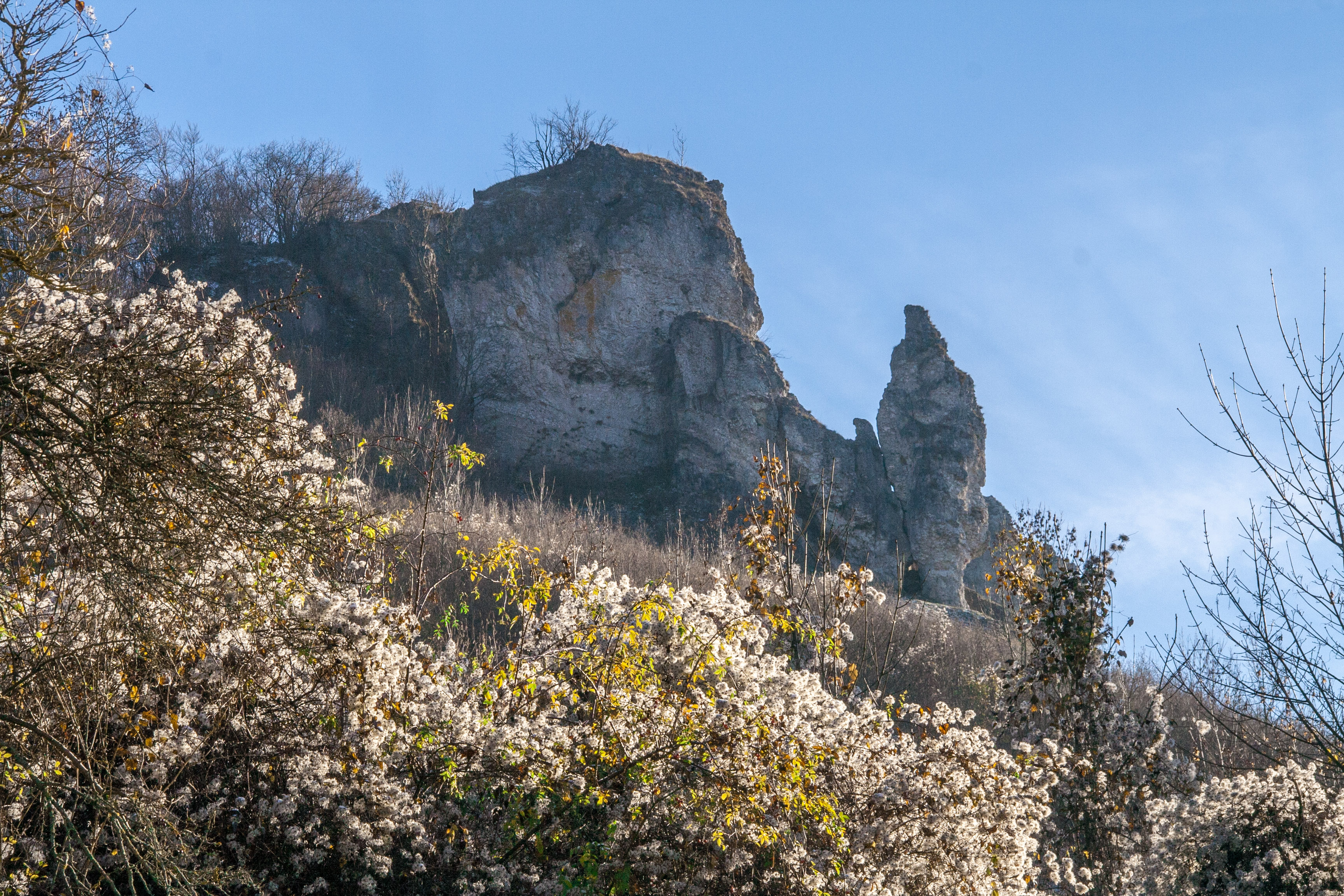
Ehrenbürg

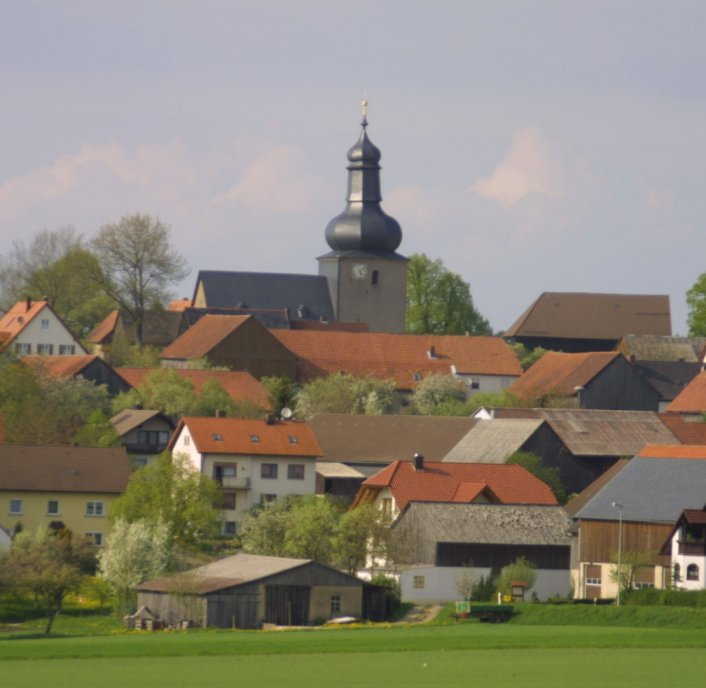
Village chapel Höhenpölz

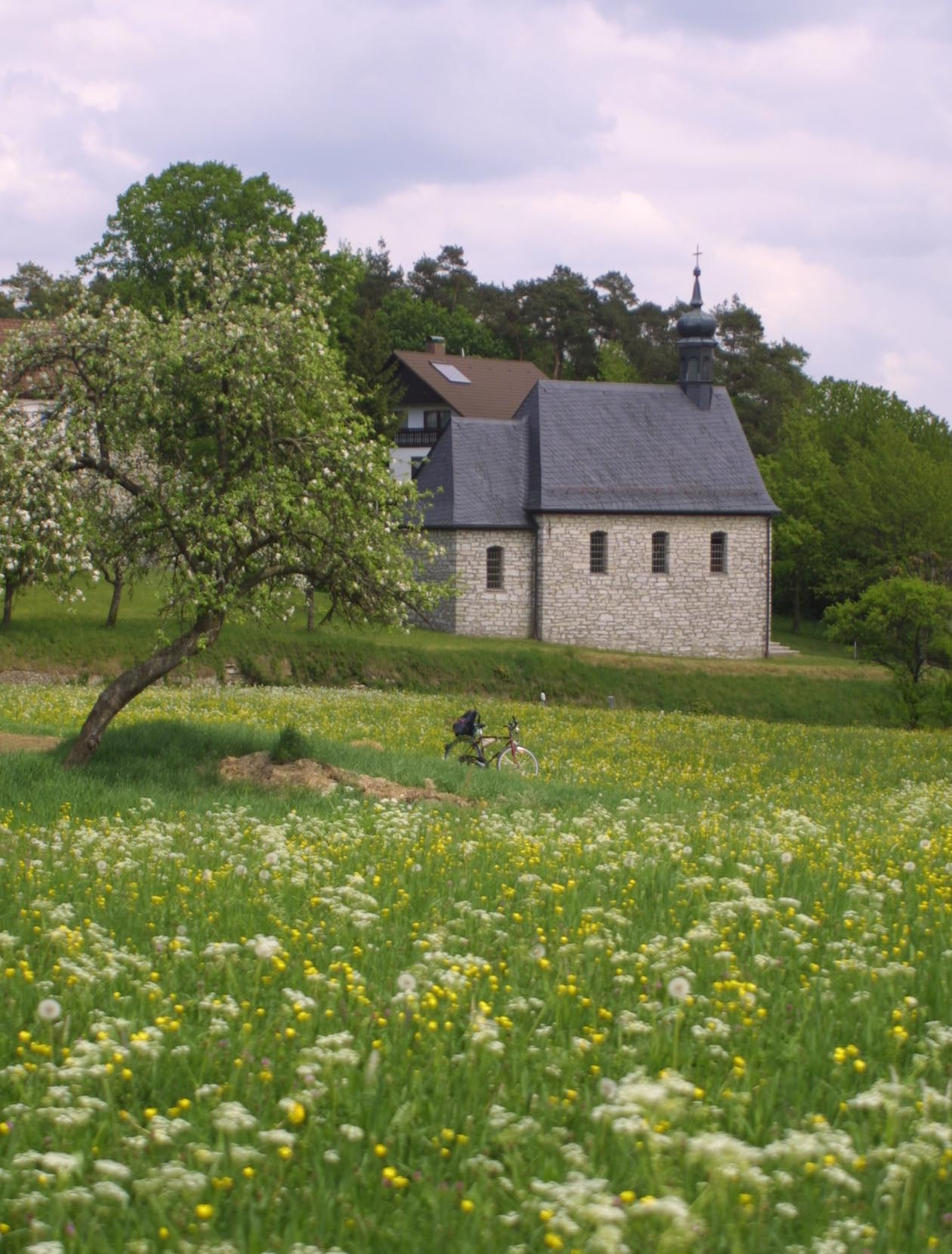
Village chapel

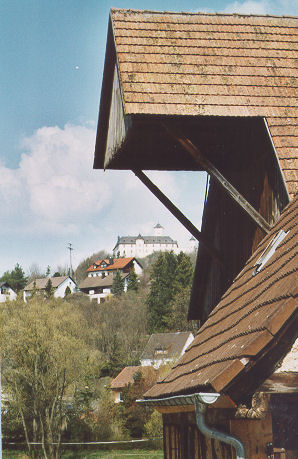
Schloss Greifenstein, seat of the Stauffenberg family

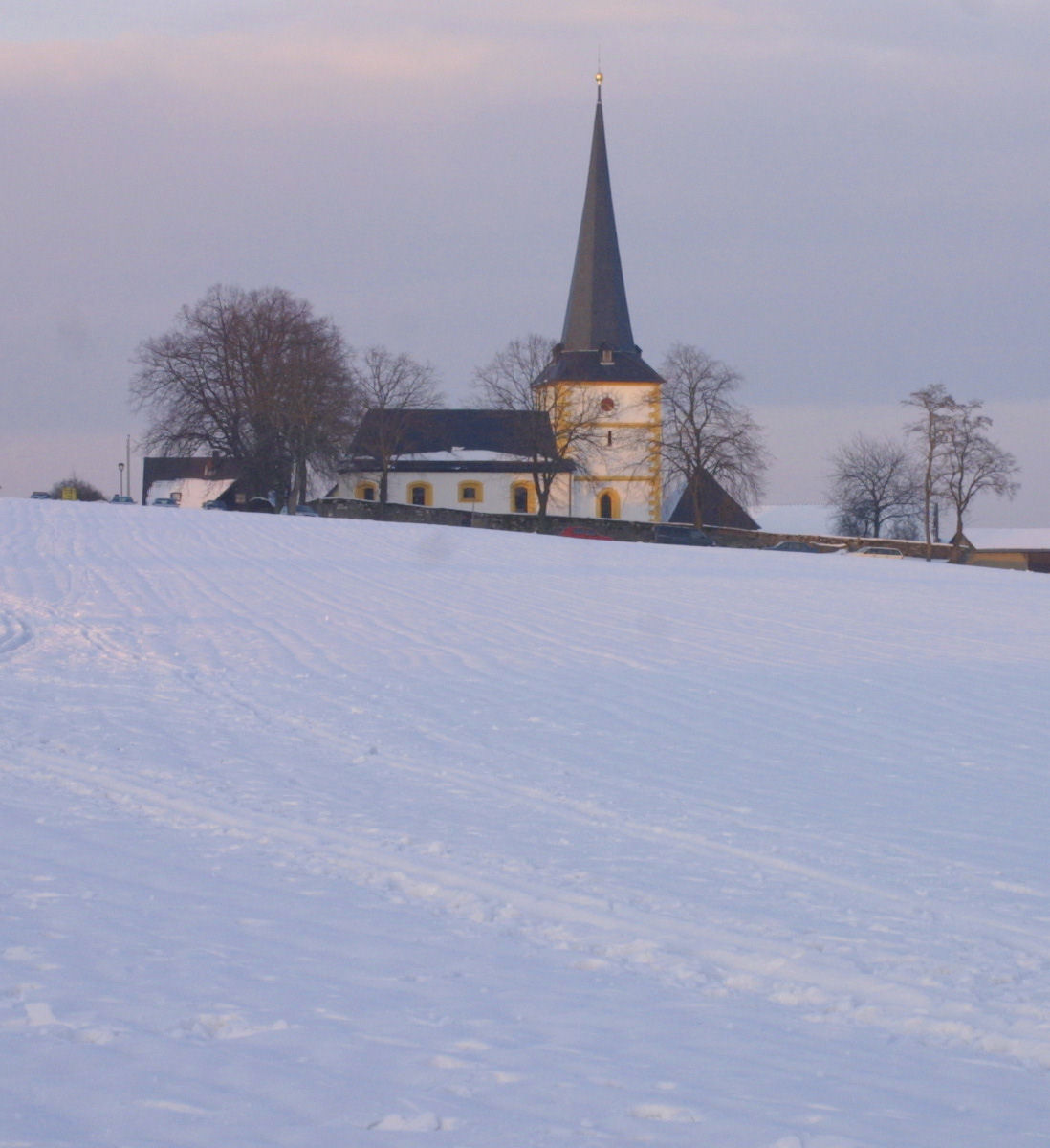
Village chapel Teuchatz

== Literature ==
In English

- Milner Barry, R.: Bayreuth and Franconian Switzerland, London, S. Sonnenschein, Lowrey & Co., 1887.

In German

- August Sieghardt: Fränkische Schweiz. Glock und Lutz, Nürnberg 1971, aus der Bibliothek Deutsche Landeskunde
- MERIAN Monatshefte, 6/XXVI: Fränkische Schweiz. 1973
- Friedrich Herrmann: Höhlen der Fränkischen und Hersbrucker Schweiz. Regensburg 1980
- Brigitte Kaulich, Hermann Schaaf: Kleiner Führer zu Höhlen um Muggendorf. Nürnberg 1980, ISBN 3-922877-00-1
- Fritz Krause: Großer Fränkische Schweiz Führer. Deutscher Wanderverlag Dr. Mair & Schnabel & Co, Stuttgart 1981, ISBN 3-8134-0135-9
- Peter Poscharsky: Die Kirchen der Fränkischen Schweiz. Palm & Enke, Erlangen 1990, ISBN 3-7896-0095-4
- Rainer Hofmann et al.: Führer zu archäologischen Denkmälern in Deutschland: Fränkische Schweiz. Theiss, Stuttgart 1990, ISBN 3-8062-0586-8
- Hans-Peter Siebenhaar, Michael Müller: Fränkische Schweiz. Michael Müller, Erlangen 1991, ISBN 3-923278-15-2
- Gustav Voit, Brigitte Kaulich, Walter Rüfer: Vom Land im Gebirg zur Fränkischen Schweiz. Eine Landschaft wird entdeckt. Palm & Enke, Erlangen 1992, ISBN 3-7896-0511-5
- Gustav Voit, Walter Rüfer: Eine Burgenreise durch die Fränkische Schweiz. Palm & Enke, Erlangen 1993, ISBN 3-7896-0064-4
- Rolf K. F. Meyer, Hermann Schmidt-Kaler: Wanderungen in die Erdgeschichte (5): Durch die Fränkische Schweiz. Dr. Friedrich Pfeil, München 1992, ISBN 3-923871-65-1
- Reinhard Feldrapp, Willi Feldrapp, Adolf Lang: Die Fränkische Schweiz. H. Stürtz, Würzburg 1992, ISBN 3-8003-0210-1
- Toni Eckert, Susanne Fischer, Renate Freitag, Rainer Hofmann, Walter Tausendpfund: Die Burgen der Fränkischen Schweiz; Ein Kulturführer. Gebietsausschuss Fränkische Schweiz 1997, ISBN 3-9803276-5-5
- Stephan Lang: Höhlen in Franken - Ein Wanderführer in die Unterwelt der Fränkischen Schweiz. Verlag Hans Carl, Nürnberg 2000
- Hardy Schabdach: Unterirdische Welten - Höhlen der Fränkischen und Hersbrucker Schweiz. Verlag Reinhold Lippert, Ebermannstadt 2000
- Thomas Hübner: 25 mal Fränkische Schweiz. Heinrichs-Verlag GmbH, Bamberg 2007, ISBN 978-3-89889-058-8
