= Dampfbahn Fränkische Schweiz =

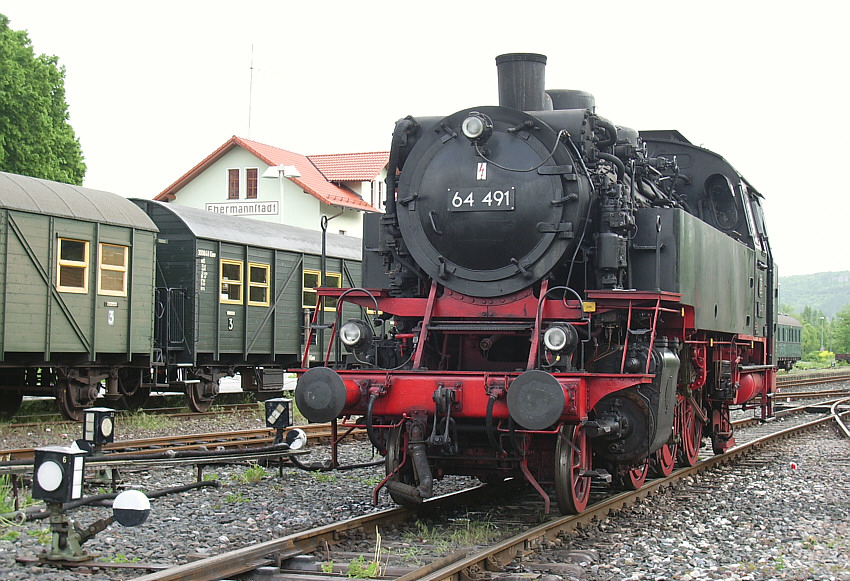
The museum's DRG Class 64 locomotive, no. 64 491, May 2006

The Dampfbahn Fränkische Schweiz e. V. (Franconian Switzerland Steam Railway Co. Ltd.) or DFS is a German museum railway operated by a registered society (eingetragener Verein) in Ebermannstadt, in a region of northern Bavaria, Germany, known as Franconian Switzerland.

== Goals ==
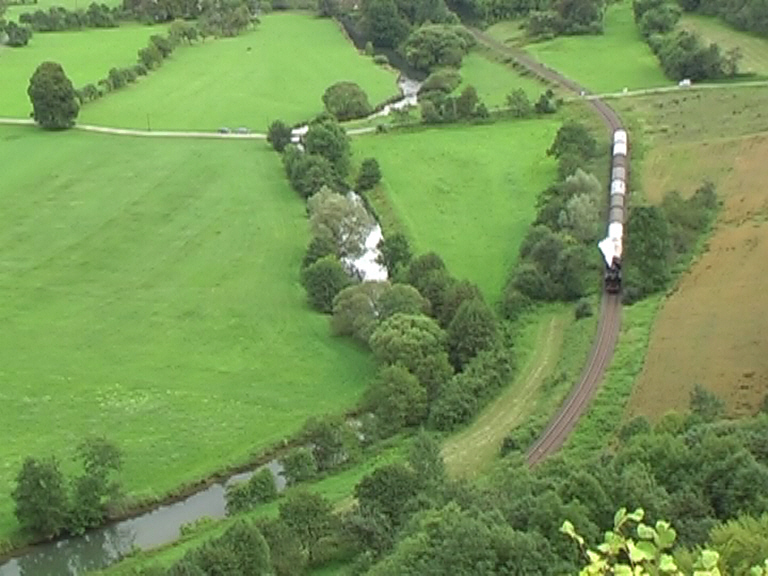
Museum railway in the Wiesent Valley

The society's goals are the:

- establishment, operation, and preservation of a museum railway on the former federal railway line from Ebermannstadt to Behringersmühle in the Wiesent Valley;
- acquisition and preservation of historic railway vehicles, especially those traditionally associated with the Ebermannstadt–Behringersmühle branch line;
- organisation of presentations, tours, trips, and exhibitions.

== Operations ==
Since 1980, the society has had a permit to operate a railway and is an authorised railway service and railway infrastructure operator. The Franconian Switzerland Steam Railway is the oldest museum railway in Franconia, northern Bavaria.

Between 1 May and 31 October, the museum railway runs scheduled trains on Sundays. For the operation of the museum, the DFS has a fleet comprising three steam locomotives, an accumulator railcar, four diesel locomotives, and a diesel railbus as well as a number of historic passenger coaches.

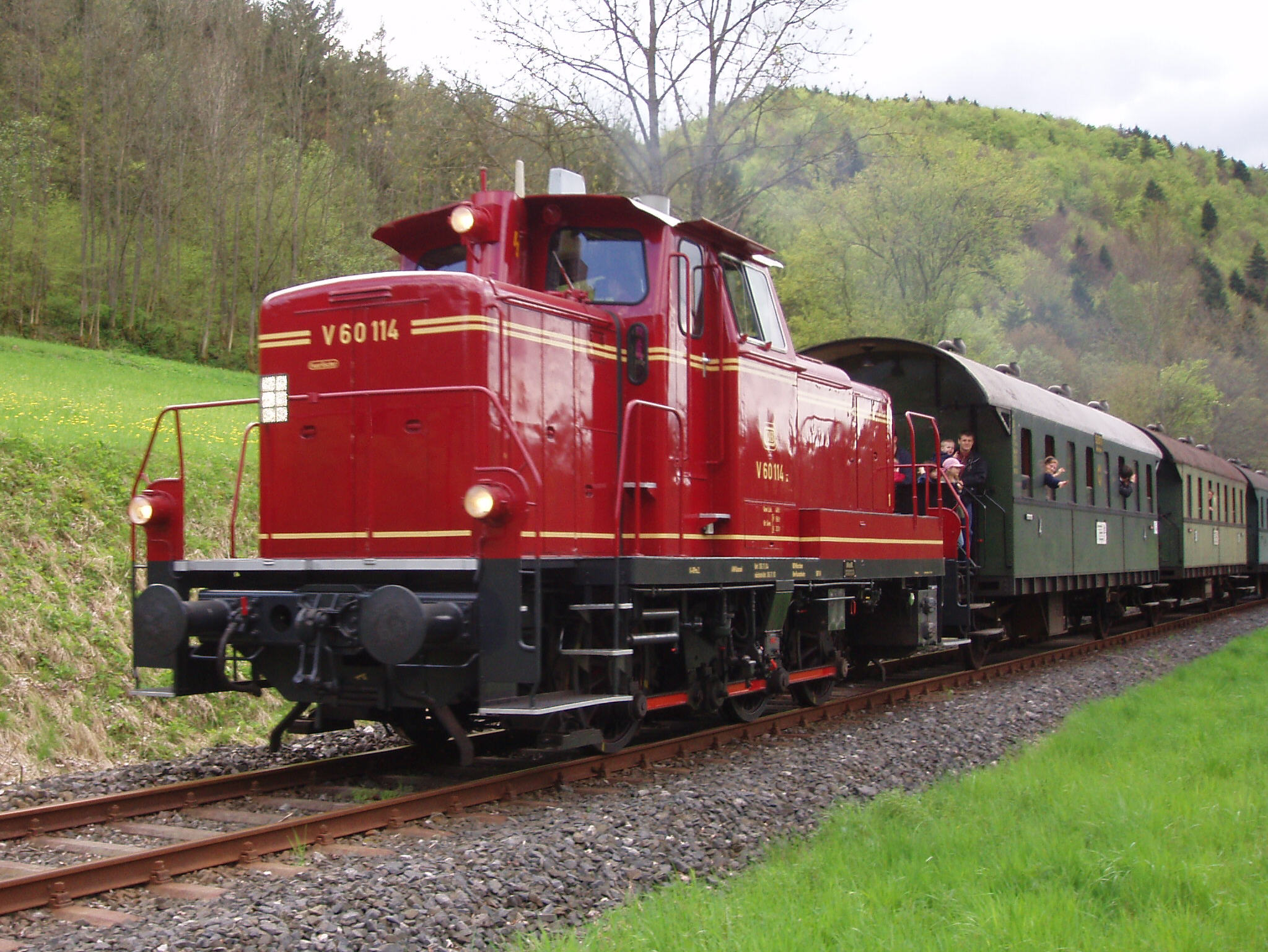
V 60 114

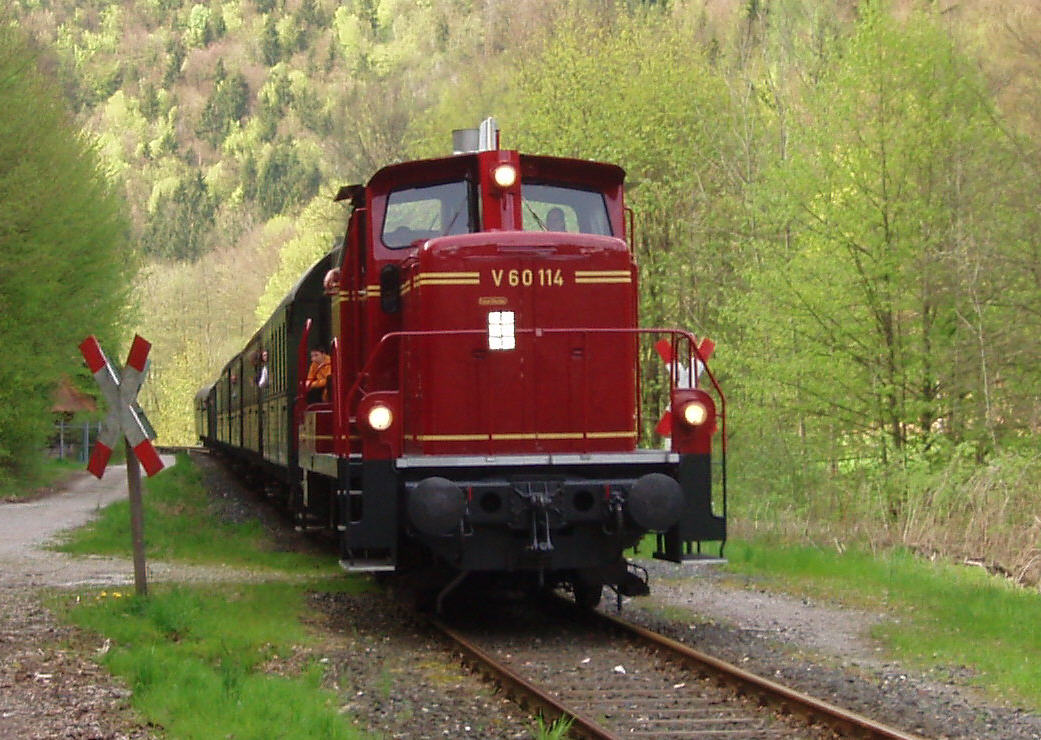
V 60 114

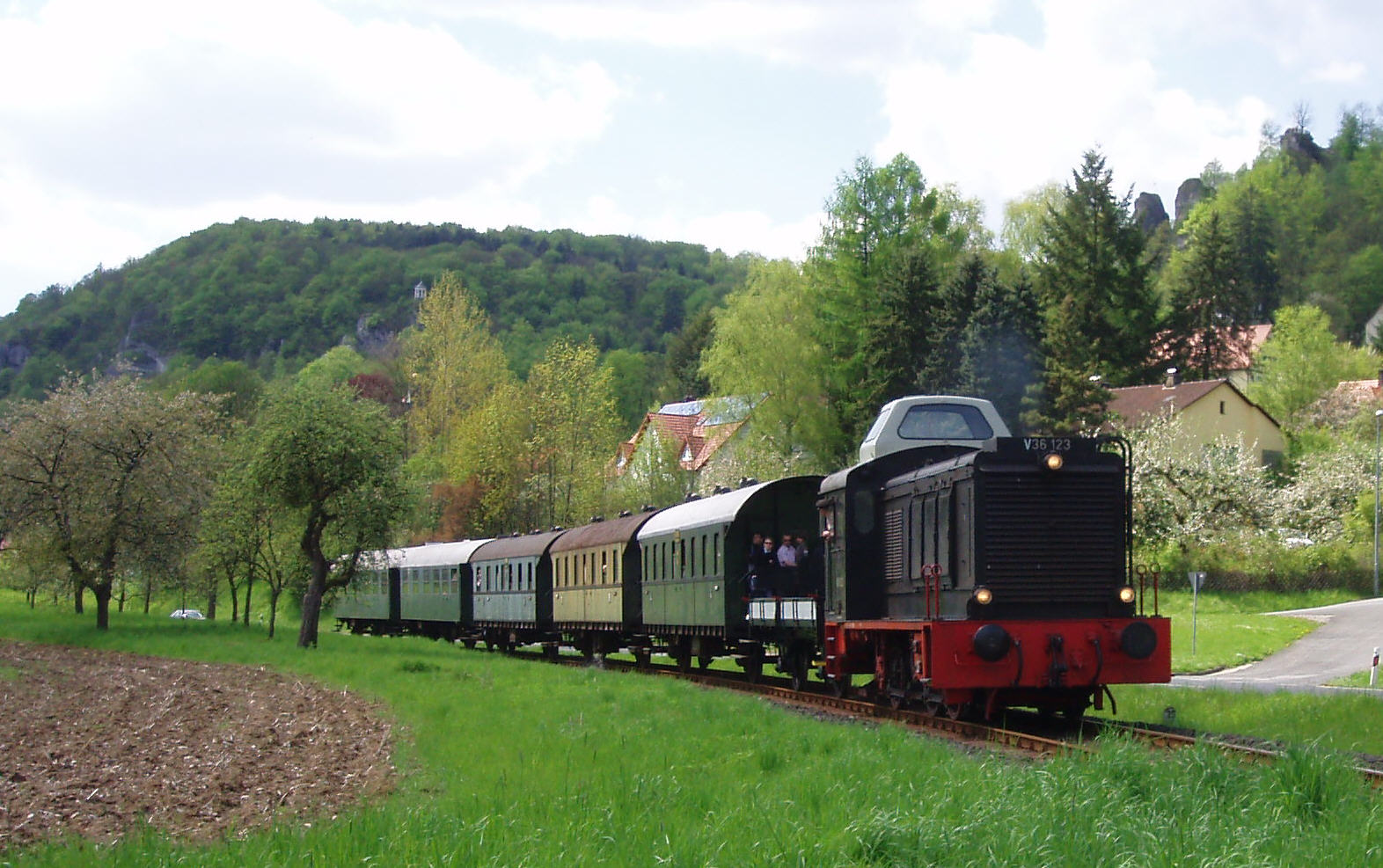
V 36 123

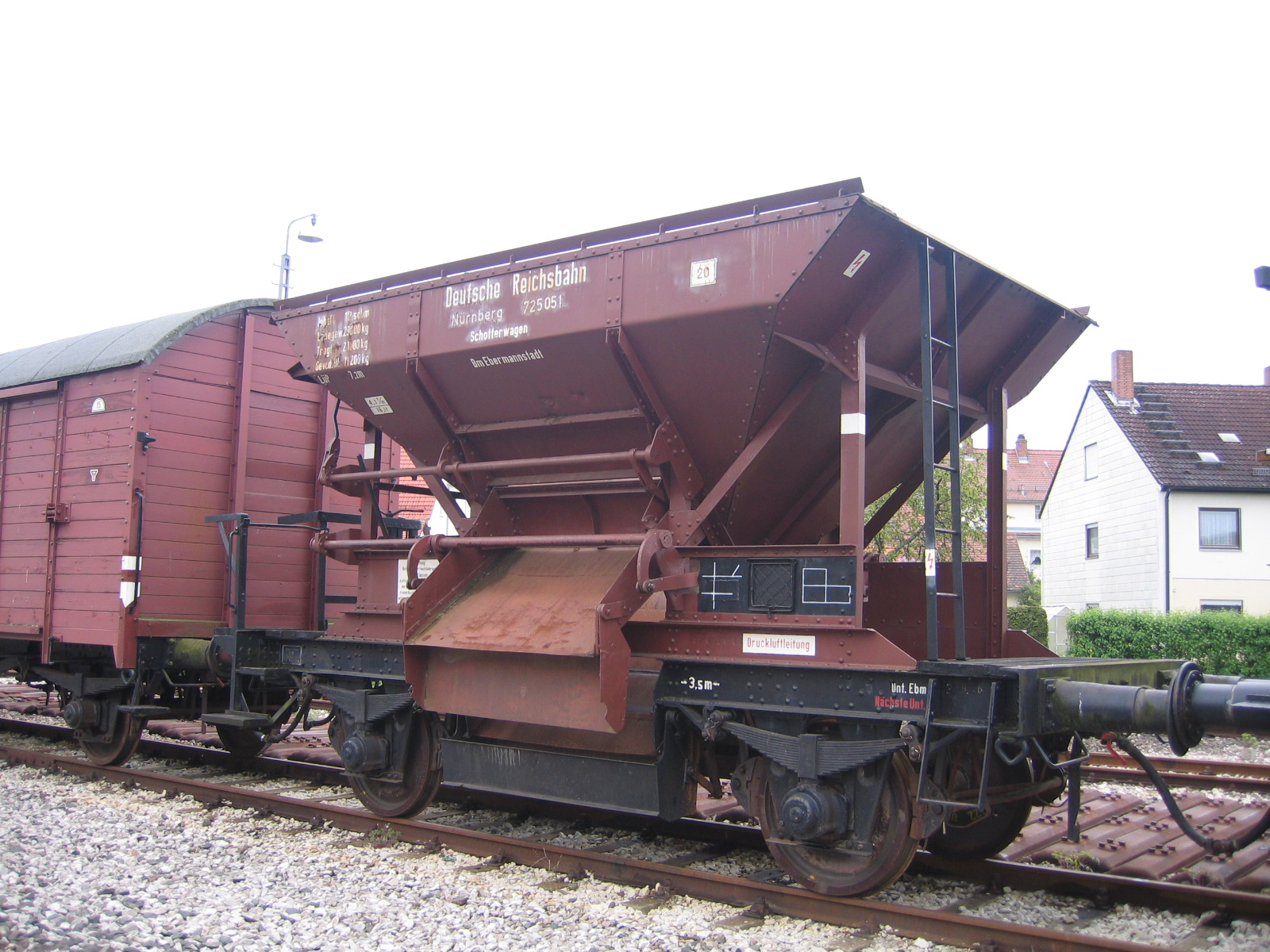
Talbot hopper at Ebermannstadt

== See also ==
- Royal Bavarian State Railways
- Deutsche Reichsbahn
- Deutsche Bundesbahn
- List of Bavarian locomotives and railbuses
- List of DRG locomotives and railbuses

== Literature ==
- Die Museumsbahn Ebermannstadt-Behringersmühle. Hans Falkenberg Verlag, Haßfurt. ISBN 3-927332-24-0.
