= Kainach =

Kainach may refer to:

- Kainach bei Voitsberg, a municipality in the district of Voitsberg in the Austrian state of Styria
- Kainach (Mur), a river of Styria, Austria, tributary of the Mur
- Kainach (Wiesent), a river of Bavaria, Germany, tributary of the Wiesent
