= Zeubach (Wiesent) =

River in Bavaria, Germany

- Map showing the location of the river mouth in Bavaria

Location
- Country: Germany
- State: Bavaria

Physical characteristics
- Source
  - location: Northeast of Ahorntal, Bavaria, Germany
  - coordinates: 49.87425°N 11.4284°E
  - elevation: 495 m (1,624 ft)
- Mouth
  - location: Wiesent
  - coordinates: 49.8429°N 11.3476°E
  - elevation: 346 m (1,135 ft)
- Length: 9.05 km (5.62 mi)

Basin features
- Progression: Wiesent→ Regnitz→ Main→ Rhine→ North Sea
- River system: Rhine

Zeubach is a river located in Franconian Switzerland region of Bavaria, Germany. The Zeubach is a left tributary of the Wiesent in the town of Waischenfeld.

== See also ==
- List of rivers of Bavaria
