= Zeubach =

Zeuach may refer to:

- Zeubach (Wiesent), a river of Bavaria, Germany, tributary of the Wiesent
- a district of Waischenfeld, a town in Bavaria, Germany
