= Leinleiter =

River in Germany

- The Leinleiter in Heiligenstadt

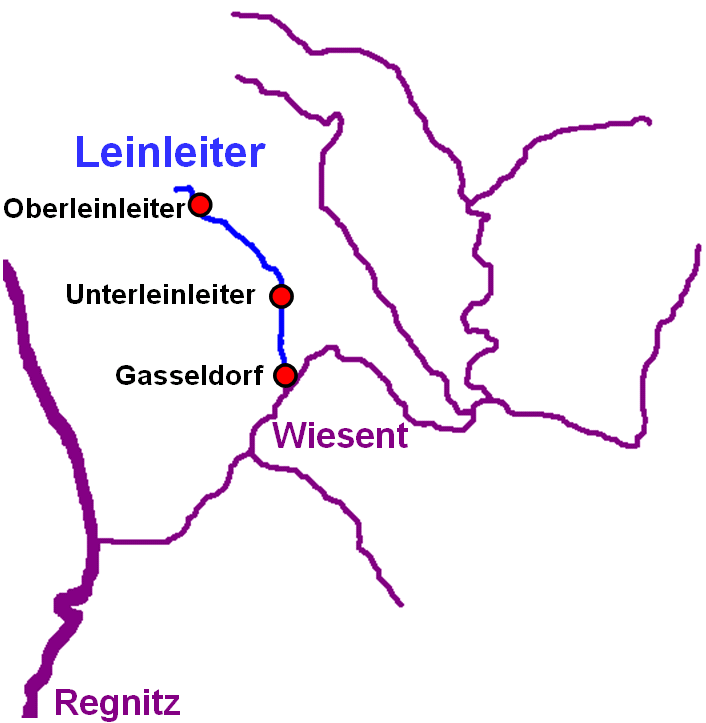

Location
- Country: Germany
- State: Bavaria

Physical characteristics
- Mouth
  - location: Wiesent
  - coordinates: 49.7899°N 11.2009°E
- Length: 19.9 km (12.4 mi)

Basin features
- Progression: Wiesent→ Regnitz→ Main→ Rhine→ North Sea

Leinleiter is a stream in the Franconian Switzerland, part of the Franconian Alb, Bavaria, Germany. It flows into the Wiesent near Ebermannstadt.

== See also ==
- List of rivers of Bavaria
