= Kainach (Wiesent) =

River in Germany

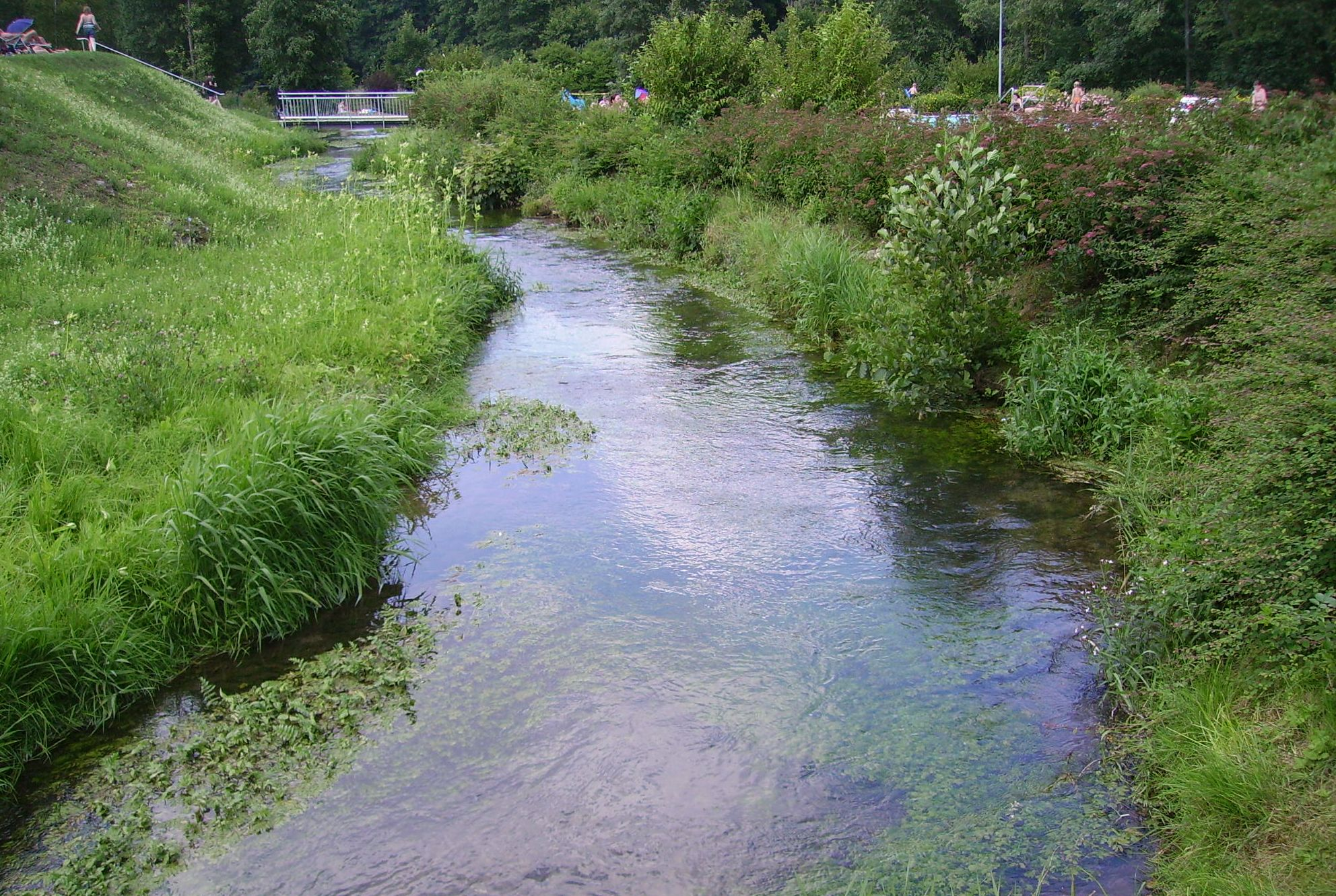
- The Kainach in the open-air bath of Hollfeld

Location
- Country: Germany
- State: Bavaria

Physical characteristics
- Mouth
  - location: Wiesent
  - coordinates: 49.9356°N 11.2903°E
- Length: 13.0 km (8.1 mi)

Basin features
- Progression: Wiesent→ Regnitz→ Main→ Rhine→ North Sea

Kainach (in its upper course: Schwalbach) is a river of Bavaria, Germany. It is a left tributary of the Wiesent in Hollfeld.

== See also ==
- List of rivers of Bavaria
