= Aufseß (river) =

River in Germany

- The Aufseß in Königsfeld

- Location of mouth in Bavaria

Location
- Country: Germany
- State: Bavaria

Physical characteristics
- Mouth
  - location: Wiesent
  - coordinates: 49.8109°N 11.2967°E
- Length: 29.6 km (18.4 mi)

Basin features
- Progression: Wiesent→ Regnitz→ Main→ Rhine→ North Sea

The Aufseß is a river in Bavaria, Germany. It passes through the village Aufseß, and flows into the Wiesent near Waischenfeld.

== See also ==
- List of rivers of Bavaria
