= Wartleiten Castle =

- Wiesenttal-Streitberg-"Wartleitenberg"

Site information
- Type: hill castle, spur castle
- Code: DE-BY
- Condition: burgstall, remains of the bergfried

Location
- Coordinates: 49°48′24″N 11°13′41″E
- Height: 410 m above sea level (NHN)

Site history
- Built: Medieval

The burgstall of Wartleiten Castle (German: Burgstall Wartleiten) is the site of a levelled, medieval hill castle situated at a height of 410 m above sea level (NHN) on the Wartleitenberg, about 600 metres southeast of the church in Streitberg, a village in the market municipality of Wiesenttal in the county of Forchheim in the south German state of Bavaria.

No above-ground ruins of the old castle have survived apart from the remains of the bergfried or fighting tower.

== Literature ==
- Hellmut Kunstmann: Die Burgen der südwestlichen Fränkischen Schweiz. Aus der Reihe: Veröffentlichungen der Gesellschaft für Fränkische Geschichte Reihe IX: Darstellungen aus der Fränkischen Geschichte, Vol. 28. Kommissionsverlag Degener und Co., Neustadt/Aisch, 1990, pp. 35–36.
