= Neideck Castle =

Castle in Germany

- Streitberg
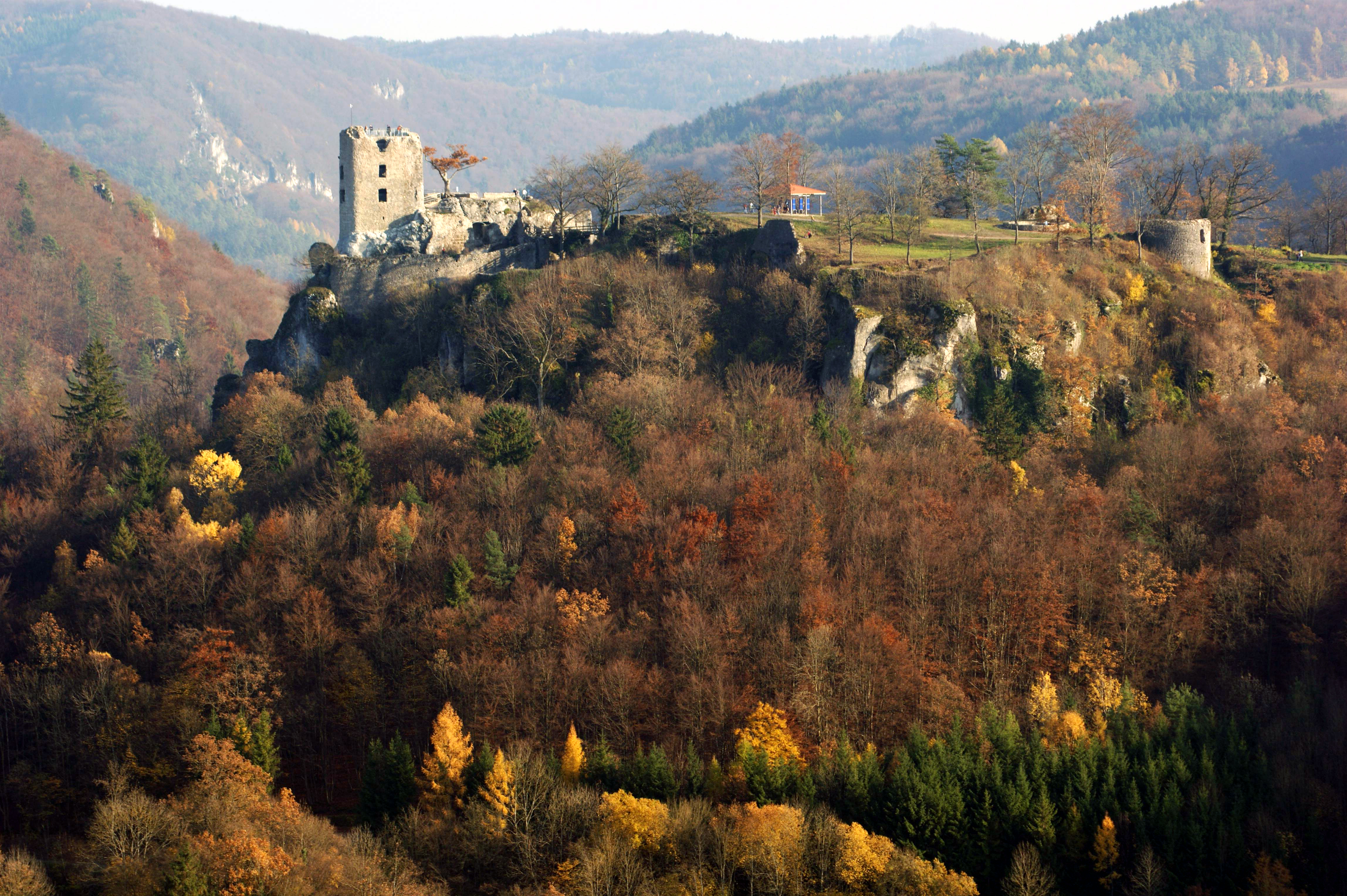
- Hill spur above the Wiesent valley, north-northeast of the Wartleitenberg with the ruins of Neideck. Seen from the west

Site information
- Type: hill castle, spur castle
- Code: DE-BY
- Condition: restored ruins

Location
- Coordinates: 49°48′31″N 11°13′56″E
- Height: 402.9 m above sea level (NN)

Site history
- Built: probably around 1050
- Materials: rubble stone walls, some with quoins

Garrison information
- Occupants: ministeriales

Neideck Castle (German: Burgruine Neideck) is a former high mediaeval nobleman's castle above the village of Streitberg, in the municipality of Wiesenttal in the Upper Franconian county of Forchheim in the German state of Bavaria. As a result of its exposed location above the valley of the Wiesent, it has become a symbol of Franconian Switzerland.

The ruins are freely accessible; the tower house is used as a viewing point.

== Location ==
The ruins of the spur castle are located in the Franconian Switzerland-Veldenstein Forest Nature Park about 800 metres east of the church in the village of Streitberg. They stand above the Wiesent valley on a hill spur (402.9 m above sea level (NN)) north-northeast of the hill of Wartleitenberg (488 m above NN).

The ruins may be reached on various hiking trails from the valley or from the villages on the plateau.

In the vicinity of Neideck there are other old castles: to the northwest are the ruins of Streitberg, to the north is the burgstall ("castle site") of Kulk on the hill called the Guckhüll, towards the east on a former river island in the Wiesent is the former motte-and-bailey castle of Wöhr near the hamlet of the same name. To the southeast, in the village of Trainmeusel, there also used to be a castle, of which the gable side is still visible. In the immediate vicinity of the Neideck, ca. 250 metres above and to the southwest is the Wartleiten and on the Hummerstein above Gasseldorf an early mediaeval burgstall.

== History ==
=== Pre- and early history ===
The plateau above the Wiesent valley was already in use in prehistoric times as a settlement area. Archaeologically, traces of settlement of the Urnfield, the late Hallstatt and early La Tène cultures, the early Roman Empire and Great Migration period have been documented. The unusual size of the medieval castle and its two vast outer baileys with their deep ditches could indicate an early medieval hillfort.

=== Founder ===
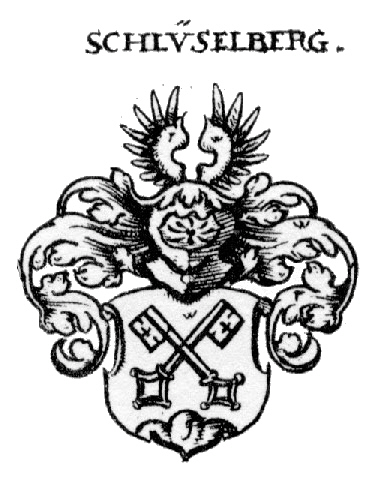
Crest of the Frankish family of Schlüsselberg

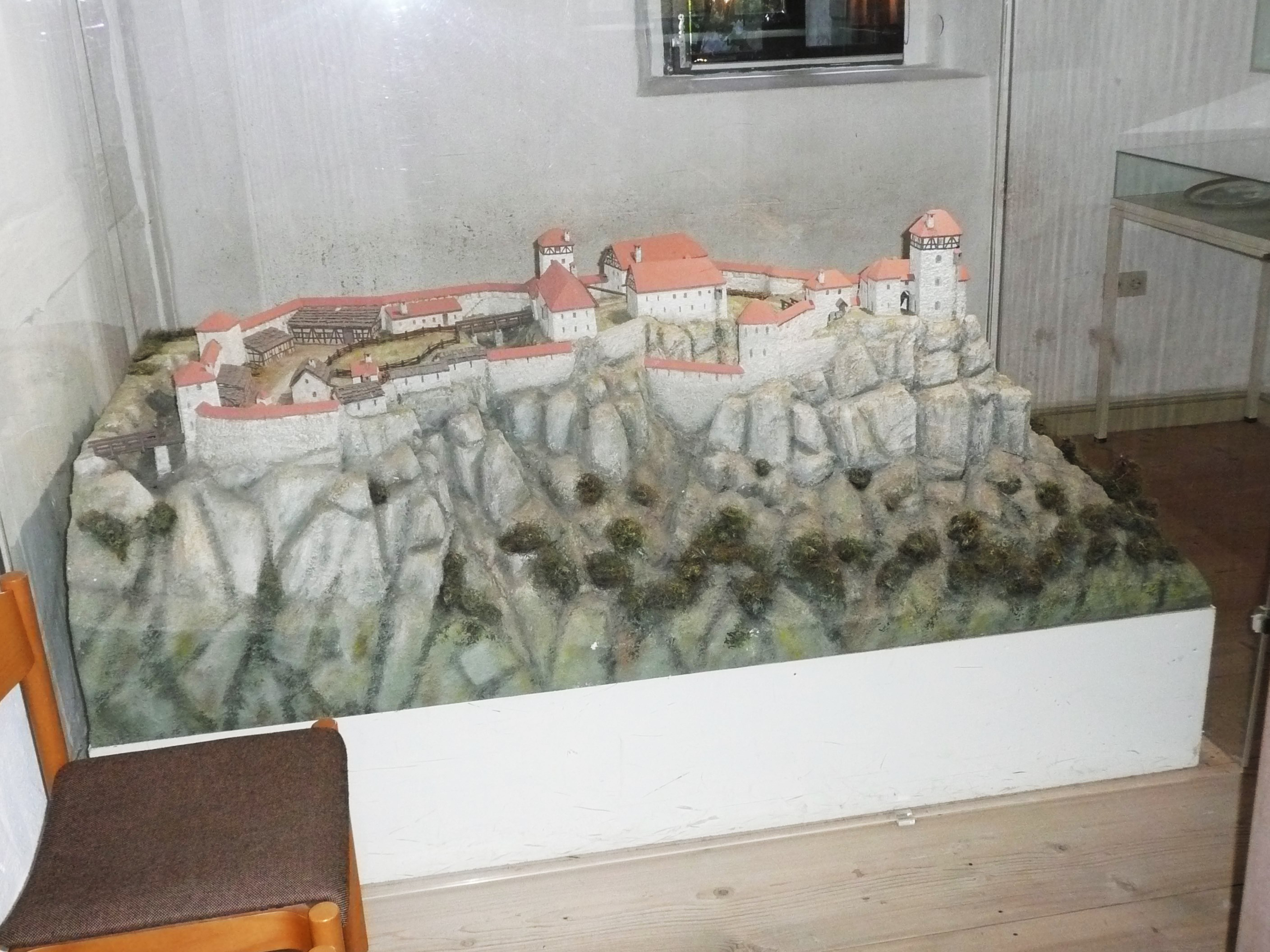
Model of the castle in the Franconian Switzerland Museum at Tüchersfeld

The castle was first mentioned in 1312 as the property of the edelfrei family of Schlüsselberg. A Henry of Neideck, however, was recorded as early as 1219 in a documentary source. The castle was therefore probably built in the 12th century, possibly as early as 1150–60. At that time there was probably only a small wooden outer bailey in front of the main castle on the distinctive shoulder of rock above the Wiesent valley.

=== Schlüsselberg possession ===
From 1312 it was owned by Conrad II of Schlüsselberg, the most important and the last representative of his family line. He expanded the Neideck into a fortress. With an area of 140 × 200 metres, it was one of the largest German castles. The shield wall, outer and inner moats, two artillery towers, main ditch and bridge, the tower house and adjoining building elements of the main castle are still visible. When Conrad of Schlüsselberg got into a feud in 1347 over the imposition of a toll with the bishops of Würzburg and Bamberg and the Burgrave of Nuremberg, they attacked and defeated him. Conrad, himself, was killed on 14 September 1347 by a stone fired from a trebuchet and the castle was subsequently destroyed. After the siege, Neideck became the seat of an office (Amt) of the bishops of Bamberg.

=== Peasant's War and destruction in the Second Margrave War ===
After the castle had survived the Peasant's War in 1525, it was captured and set on fire in 1553 in Second Margrave War by mercenaries of Margrave Albert Alcibiades of Brandenburg-Kulmbach. Since then it has been a ruin.

Until the early 19th century, the fortress was used by the residents of the valley as a quarry. Its decline was further accelerated in the period 1737-1743 when rock on which the castle stands was quarried for marble.

The increasing decline of the castle ruins prompted the municipality of Streitberg shortly after the Second World War to start implementing the first conservation measures. In 1996, the county of Forchheim began the comprehensive renovation of the ruins; this was completed in 2008 with the opening of an "Archaeological Park" on the castle site. The work was accompanied by archaeological excavations, but not always in accordance to the latest historic preservation methods.

== Description ==
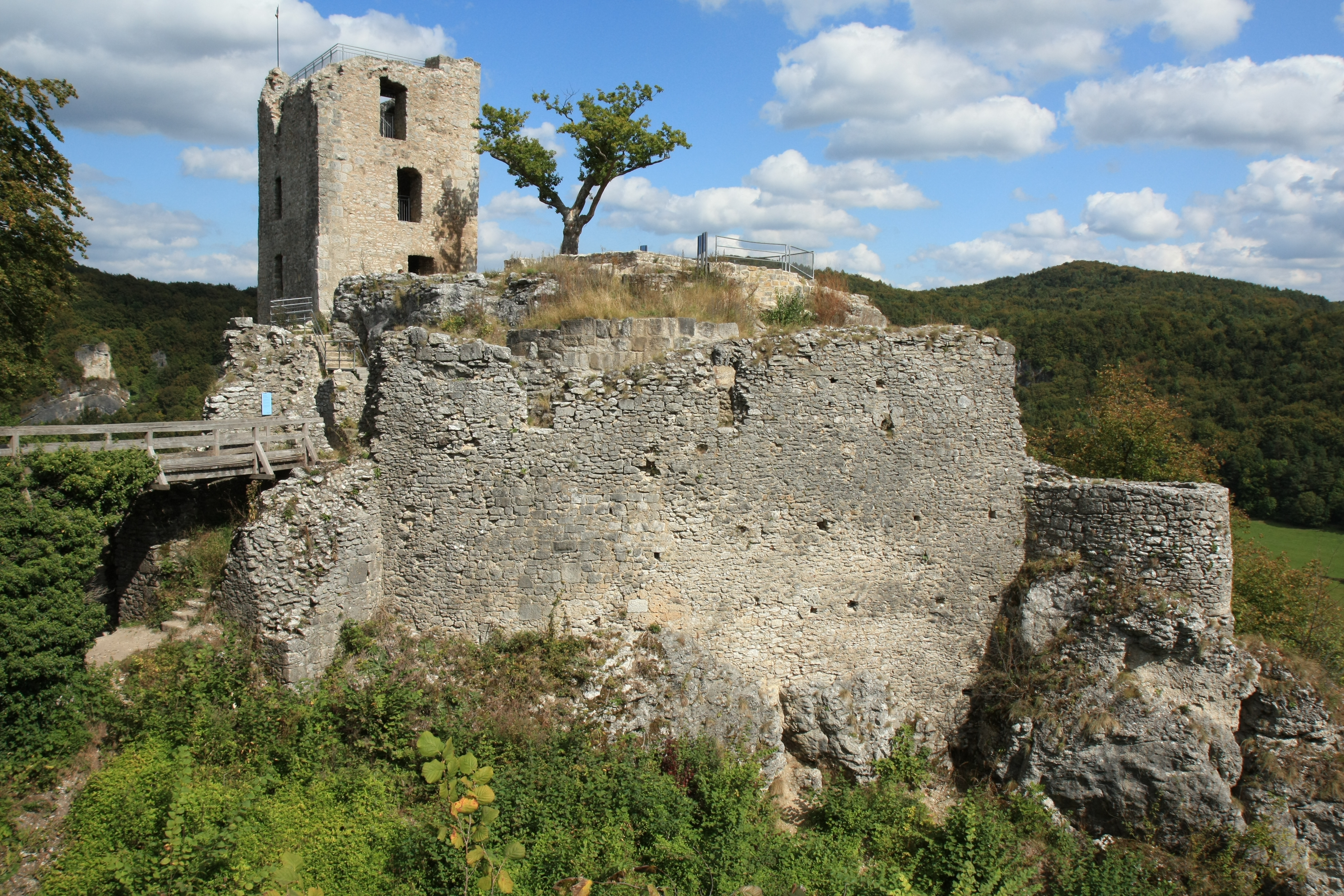
View of the main castle, its tower house and the moat seen from the west

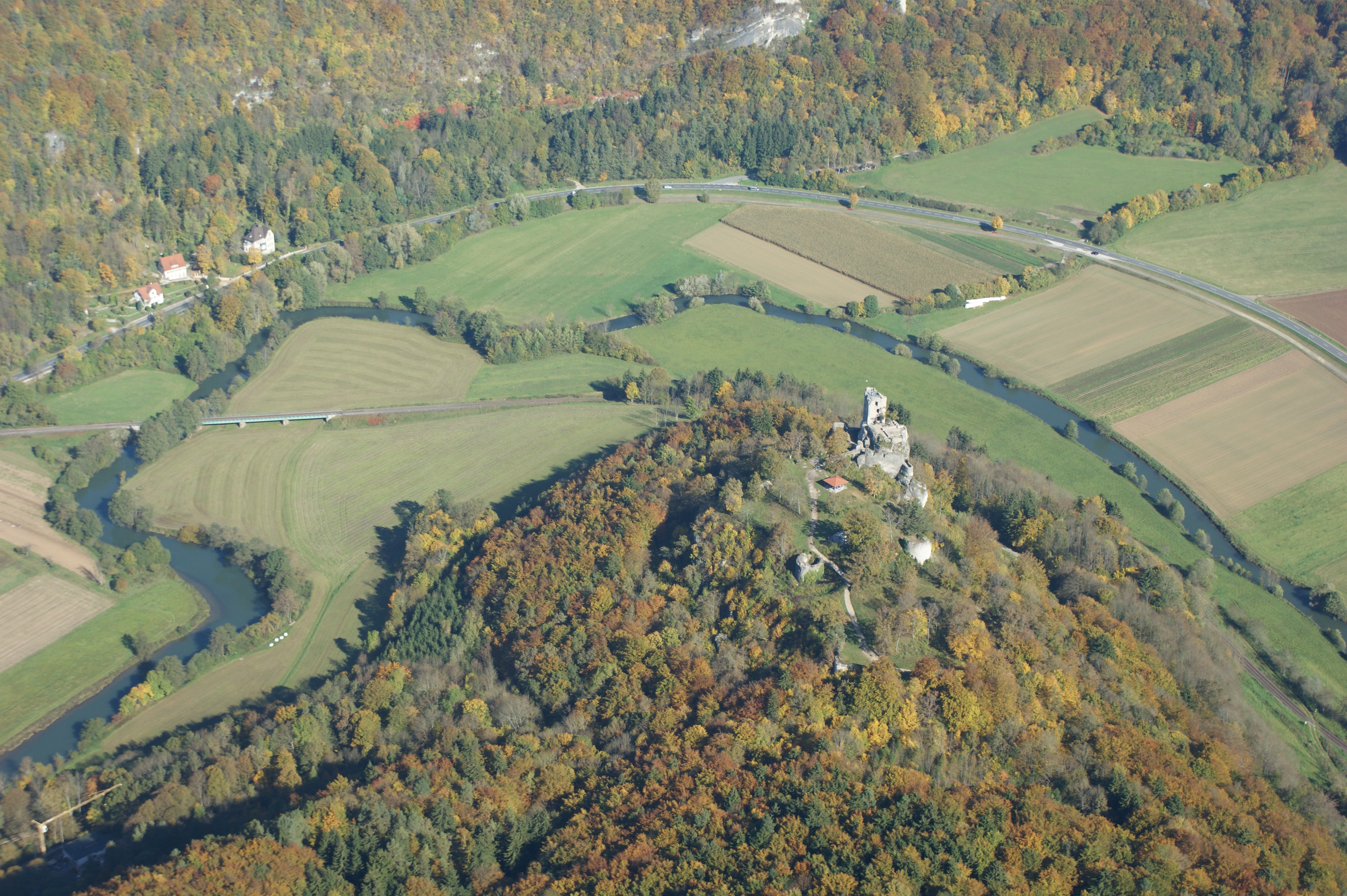
The ruins of Neideck and the Wiesent in autumn 2010

The large castle complex consists of three separate areas, separated by deep neck ditches. Even the outer bailey was protected by a moat approximately 100 metres long, 22 metres wide and about 7 metres deep. The towering shield wall behind it was built around 1300. Of its other buildings only small traces of the foundations remain.

The middle bailey was reinforced in the early 16th century by two artillery roundels that have partly survived. The 'cross key' embrasures (Kreuzschlüsselscharten) of the eastern tower were designed for arquebuses and crossbows. The rectangular slits of the western roundel were probably added around 1531–32. This bastion flanked the approach road. The curtain walls between the roundels and the gate of the middle bailey have been almost completely lost.

The inner bailey is located on a projecting spur of rock that points northeast. The mighty tower house rises three stories above its foundations. It was built from 1347 after the destruction of the castle on those older foundations and walls that were still usable. The former vault of the ground floor probably dates to the early 13th century. Above the surviving three storeys there was originally a fourth stone upper storey, possibly even a timber-framed house. The obligatory elevated entrance on the first floor has survived; the ground floor access was only created in modern times. Since 2008, a staircase has enabled visitors to ascend to the 10 metre-high wall crown.

The remaining elements of the inner bailey date largely to the period around 1480, when the fortress was expanded and reinforced after a siege. Still recognisable are the barrel vaulted cellar of a building and the shaft of a filter cistern. The historical entrance consisted of a late mediaeval gatehouse and a stone bridge over the deep neck ditch. In front of the gatehouse lay a short drawbridge.

One theory is that the water supply was provided partially by the Trainmeusel Spring on the hillside to the north. Water from this spring was fed along a 1,300-metre-long tree trunk pipe made of oak trunks into the castle well. More recent excavations of the inner bailey, however, do not support this thesis by Nuremberg Castle researcher, Hellmut Kunstmann. The alleged well was in reality a filter cistern, fed by wooden pipes from the roofs of buildings immediately adjoining the bergfried and other nearby buildings.

The castle site is classified by the Bavarian State Office for Monument Protection (BLfD) as a hillfort of the Urnfield period, the late Hallstatt and early La Tène periods, the early Roman Empire and the migration period and listed as monument number D-4-6133-0110. The subterranean parts of the ruins of the medieval and early modern castle are also a protected monument.

The name of the castle is probably derived from its location on a "lower corner" (German: Nieder = lower; Ecke = "corner"). Because of this, militarily very unfavourable, situation, a stone watchtower was erected on the ridge above the castle site. This tower was surrounded by a moat which is still visible in the terrain. The tower itself has almost completely disappeared, but is recalled in the local place name of Wartleiten (monument number D-4-6133-0153).

== Historical illustrations ==
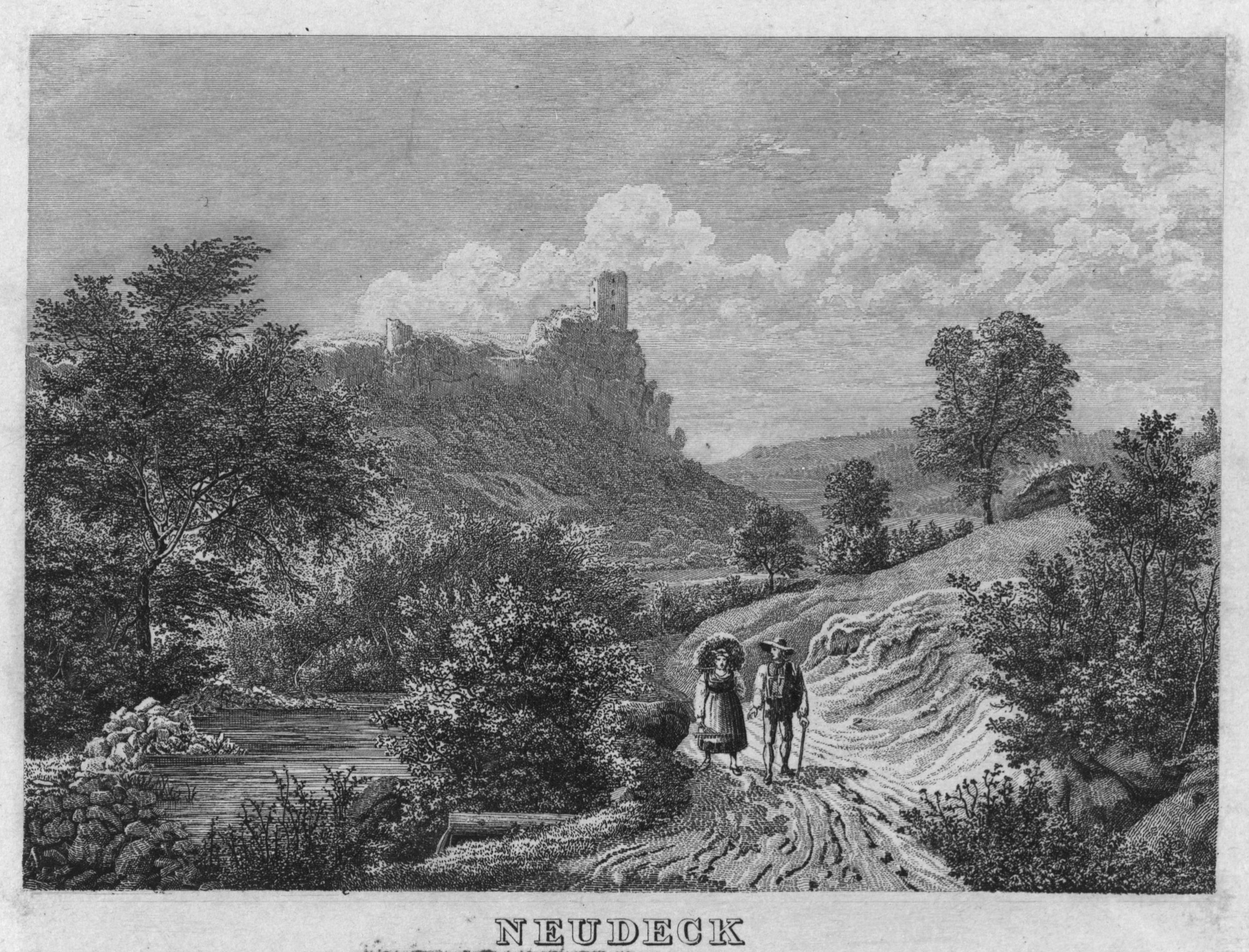
Ruins of Neideck, 1834 steel engraving by Conrad Wießner

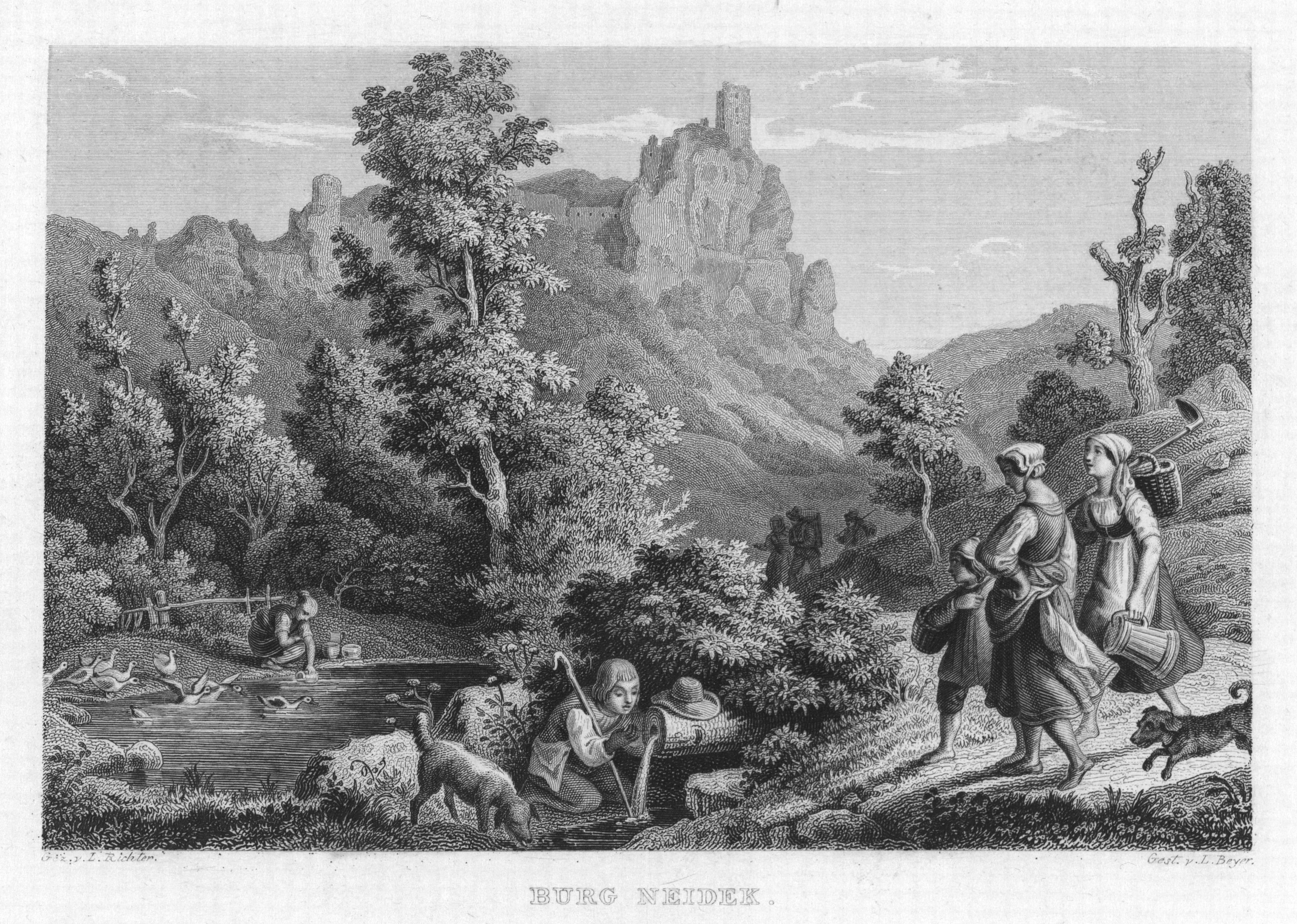
Ruins of Neideck, 1840 stell engraving by L. Beyer from a drawing by Ludwig Richter

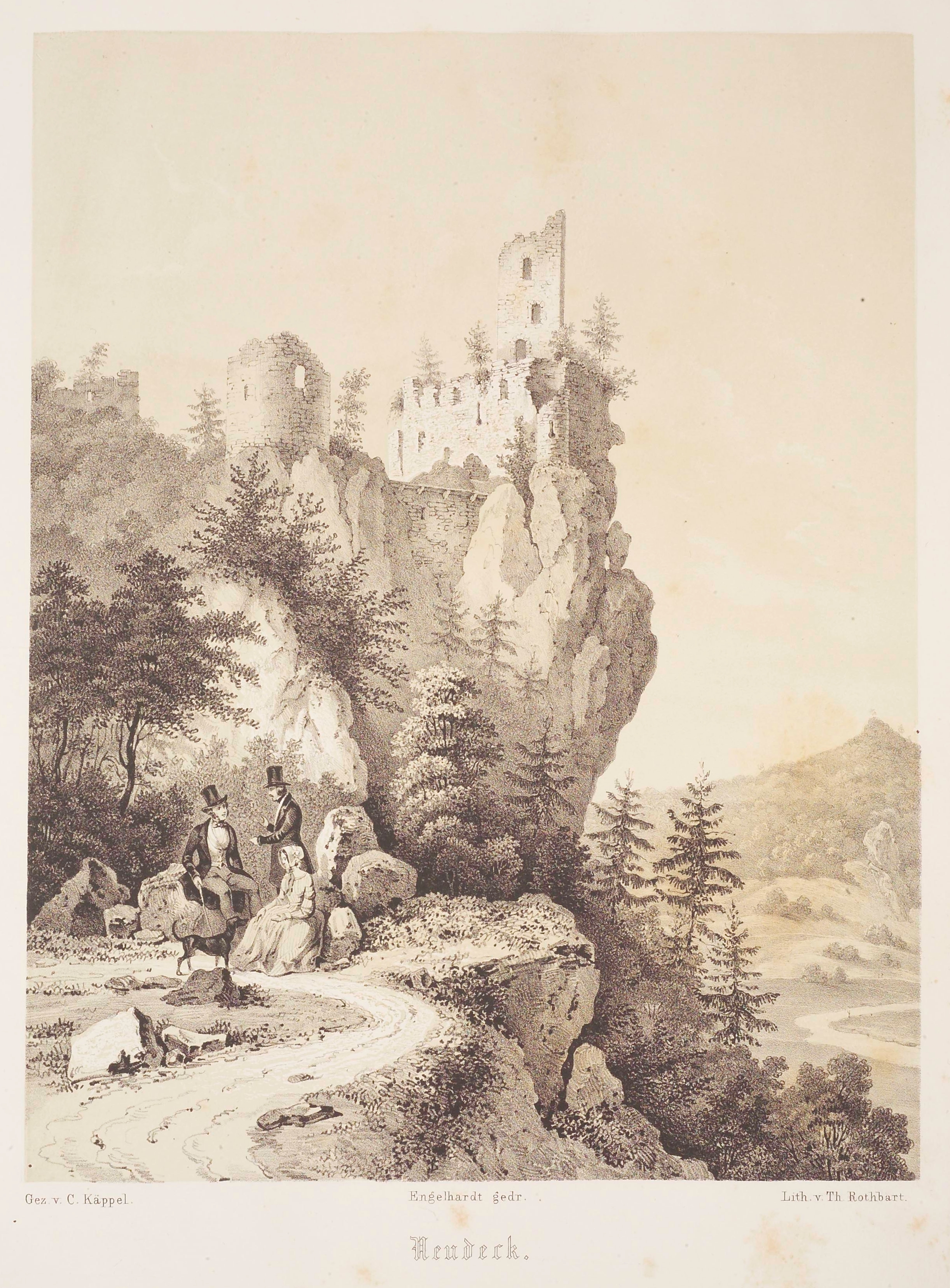
Ruins of Neideck, lithography (c. 1840) by Theodor Rothbarth from a drawing by Carl Käppel

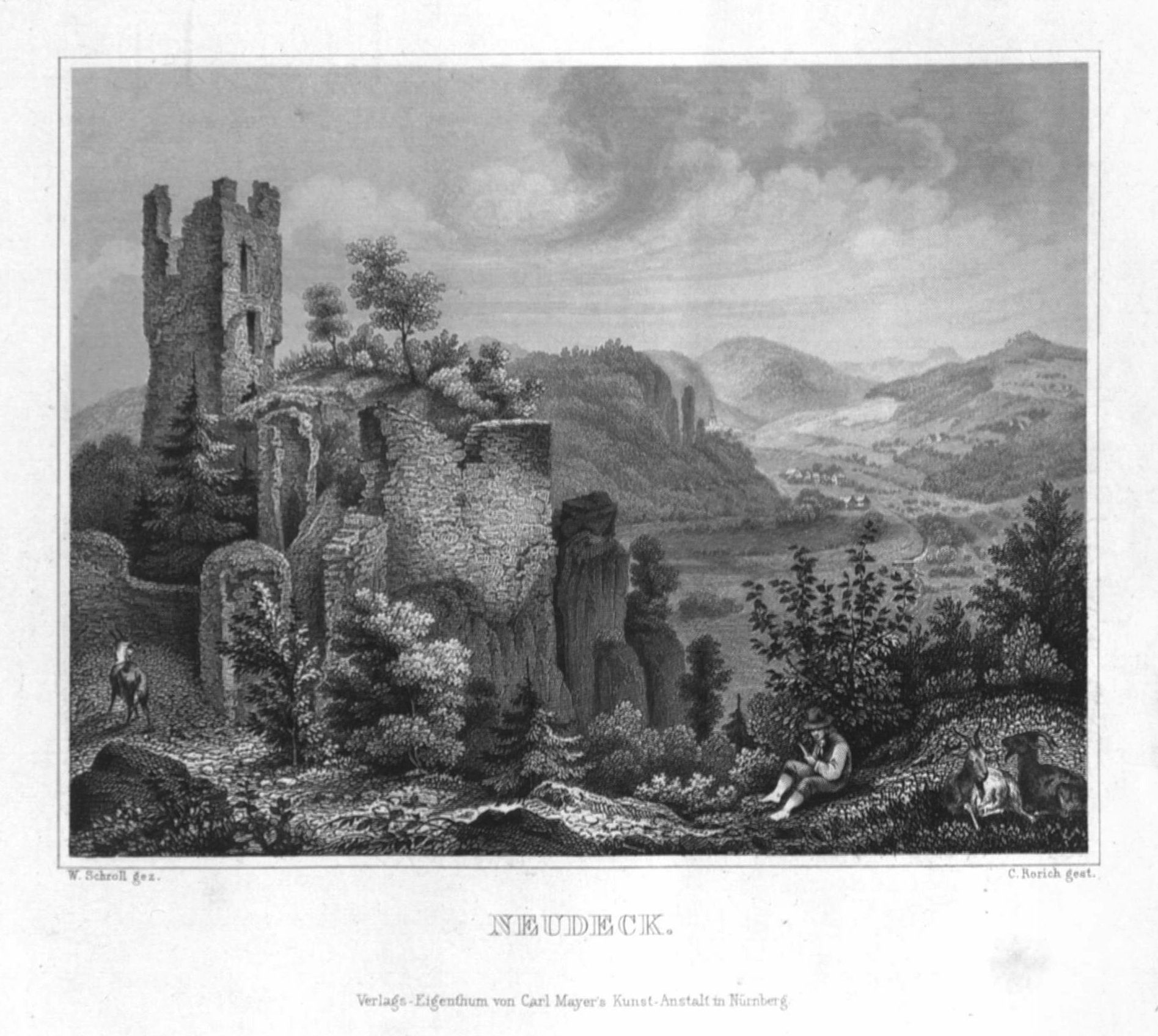
Ruins of Neideck, 1858 steel engraving

== Literature ==
- Ursula Pfistermeister: Wehrhaftes Franken - Band 3: Burgen, Kirchenburgen, Stadtmauern um Bamberg, Bayreuth und Coburg. Fachverlag Hans Carl GmbH, Nuremberg, 2002, ISBN 3-418-00387-7, pp. 94–95.
- Toni Eckert, Susanne Fischer, Renate Freitag, Rainer Hofmann, Walter Tausendpfund: Die Burgen der Fränkischen Schweiz: Ein Kulturführer. Gürtler Druck, Forchheim, 1997, ISBN 3-9803276-5-5, pp. 100–104.
- Gustav Voit, Brigitte Kaulich, Walter Rüfer: Vom Land im Gebirg zur Fränkischen Schweiz - Eine Landschaft wird entdeckt. (Schriftenreihe des Fränkische-Schweiz-Vereins, Band 8) Verlag Palm und Enke, Erlangen, 1992, ISBN 3-7896-0511-5, pp. 115–125.
- Gustav Voit, Walter Rüfer: Eine Burgenreise durch die Fränkische Schweiz. Verlag Palm und Enke, Erlangen 1991, ISBN 3-7896-0064-4, p;. 120–126.
- Hellmut Kunstmann: Die Burgen der südwestlichen Fränkischen Schweiz. Kommissionsverlag Degener und Co., Neustadt an der Aisch 1990, pp. 37–58.
- Björn-Uwe Abels, Joachim Zeune, et al.: Führer zu archäologischen Denkmälern in Deutschland, Band 20: Fränkische Schweiz. Konrad Theiss Verlag GmbH und Co., Stuttgart, 1990, ISBN 3-8062-0586-8, pp. 243–245.
- Brigitte Kaulich, Gustav Voit, et al.: Rund um die Neideck. Verlag Palm und Enke, Erlangen, 1983, ISBN 3-7896-0057-1, pp. 278–282.
