= Pomeranian Switzerland =

Hill country region in northwestern Poland

- Pommersche Schweiz, Szwajcaria Pomorska
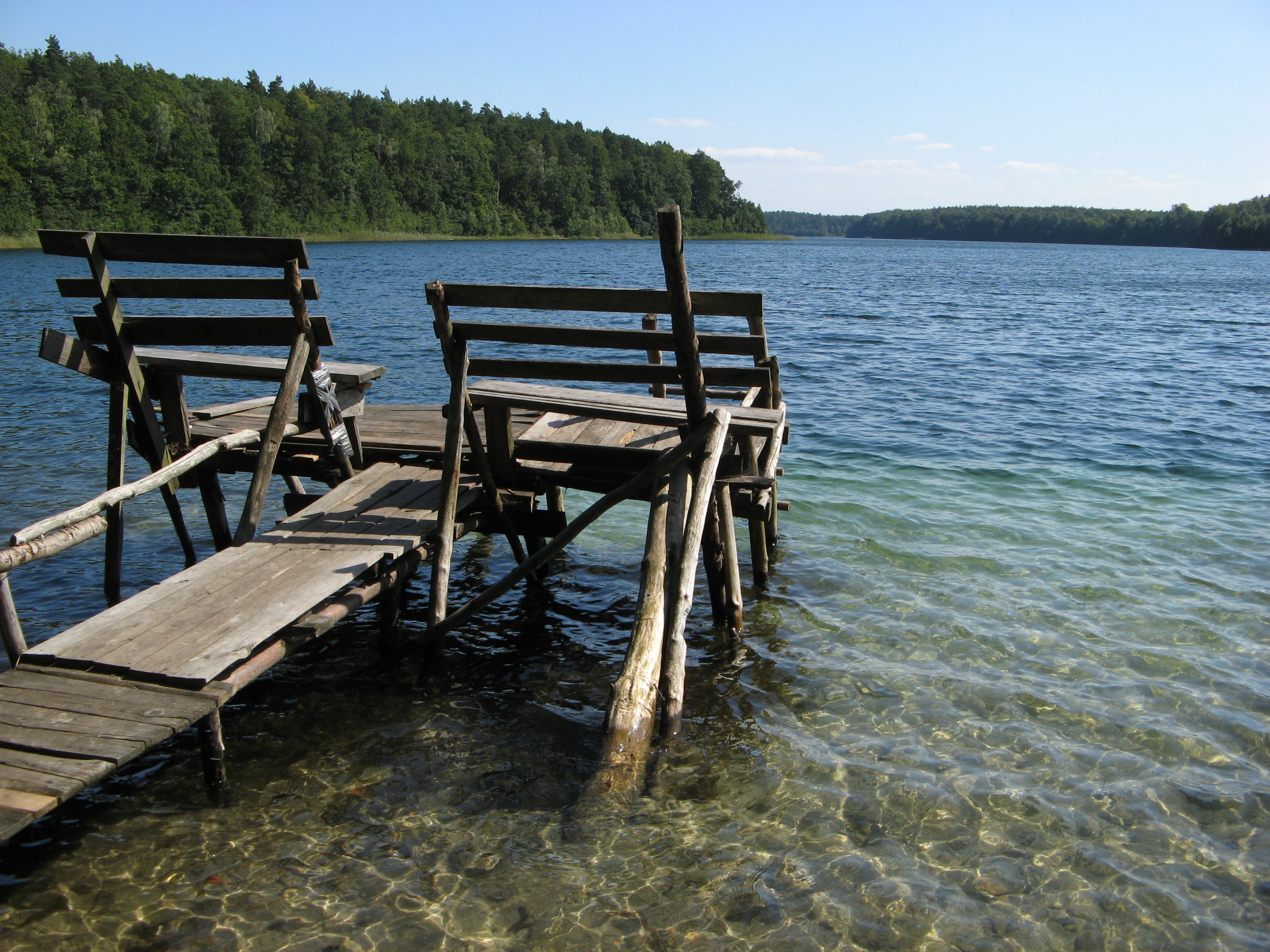
- Lake Cremmin (Jezioro Krzemno)

- Location within Poland
- Location: West Pomerania, Poland
- Coordinates: 53°35′25″N 16°02′29″E

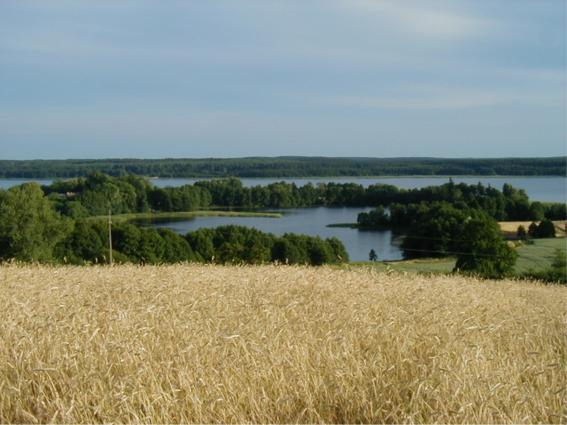
Jezioro Lubie (Großer Lübbesee)

Pomeranian Switzerland (German: Pommersche Schweiz, Polish: Szwajcaria Pomorska) is a hill country region in Pomerania in the Polish Voivodeship of West Pomerania. It is part of the West Pomeranian Lake District on the Baltic Uplands. In Polish, the term Pomeranian Switzerland has not established itself and is only rarely used. In Poland, they tend to speak of the Dramburg Lake District (Pojezierze Drawskie) when referring to Pomeranian Switzerland. The region around Połczyn Zdrój (Bad Polzin), by contrast, is known in Polish as Polzin Switzerland (Szwajcaria Połczyńska). The area has been described as a "region of beautiful lakes surrounded by beautiful woods."

== Location ==
Pomeranian Switzerland lies about 30 km (19 mi) west of Szczecinek and runs from Połczyn Zdrój (Bad Polzin) in the north to Drawsko Pomorskie (Dramburg) in the southwest and Złocieniec (Falkenburg) and Czaplinek (Tempelburg) by the Drawsko Lake in the south. Through the region runs the Polzin–Tempelburg section of route 163. The hill country of Pomeranian Switzerland rises to about 250 metres above sea level.

== Literature ==
- Sachs, Ruth Hanna (2003). White Rose history. Vol. 1. Phoenixville, Pa: Exclamation! Publishers. ISBN 0-9710541-9-3.
