= Ahorntal =

- Municipality
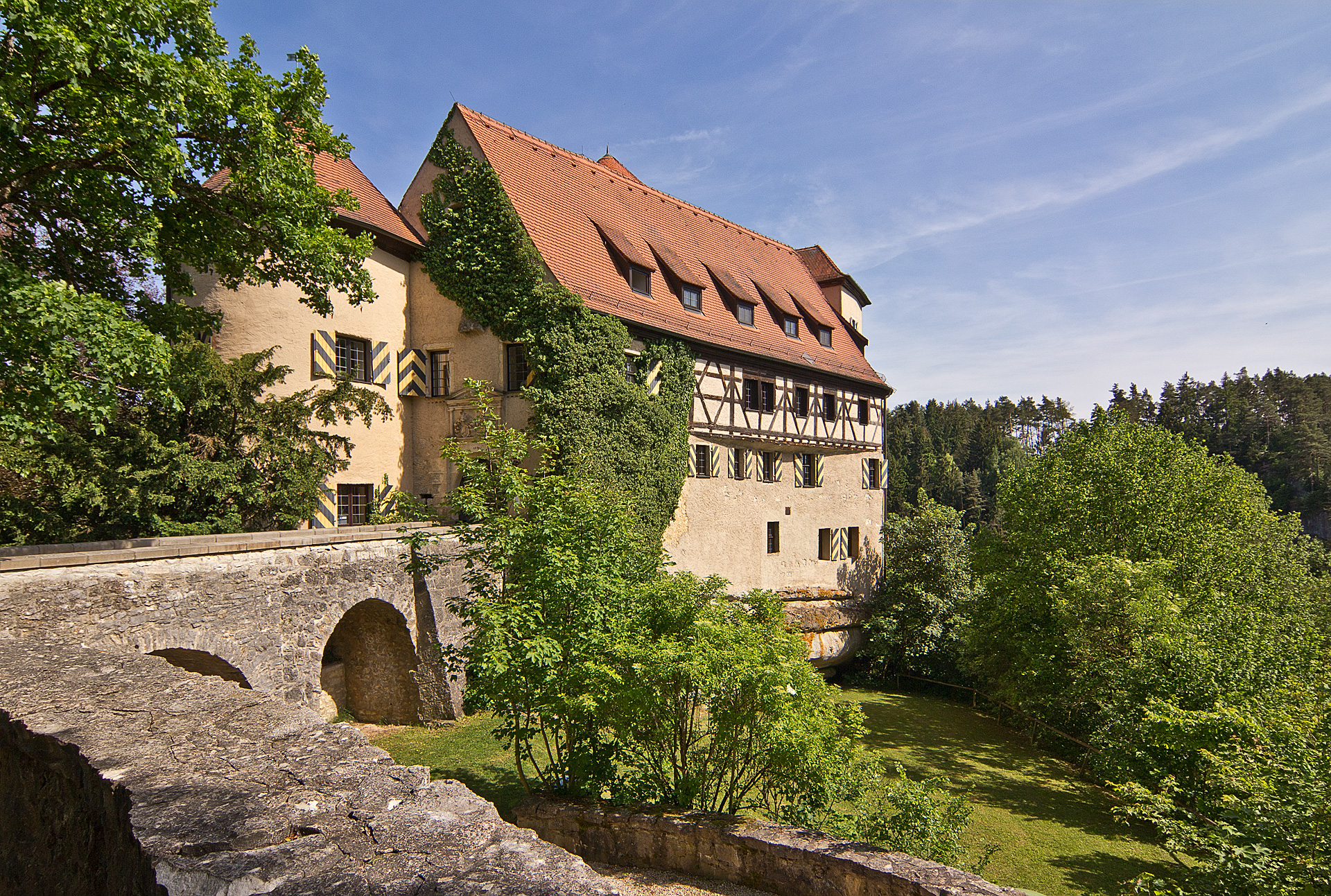
- Rabenstein Castle

- Coat of arms

- Location of Ahorntal within Bayreuth district
- Interactive map of Ahorntal
- Location within Germany Location within Bavaria
- Coordinates: 49°51′N 11°26′E
- Country: Germany
- State: Bavaria
- Admin. region: Oberfranken
- District: Bayreuth

Government
  - Mayor (2019–25): Florian Questel (Greens)

Area
  - Total: 41.70 km^{2} (16.10 sq mi)
- Elevation: 400 m (1,300 ft)

Population (2025-12-31)
  - Total: 2,172
  - Density: 52.09/km^{2} (134.9/sq mi)
- Time zone: UTC+01:00 (CET)
  - Summer (DST): UTC+02:00 (CEST)
- Postal codes: 95491, 91344, 95490
- Dialling codes: 09202
- Vehicle registration: BT, EBS, ESB, KEM, MÜB, PEG
- Website: www.ahorntal.de

Ahorntal is a municipality in the district of Bayreuth in the state (Bundesland) of Bavaria in Germany.

Ahorntal is known for its generally temperate weather. The town focuses on environmental conservation. Tourism provides revenue for the local economy.
