= Wiesent (Regnitz) =

River in Germany

- The Wiesent seen from Neideck Castle

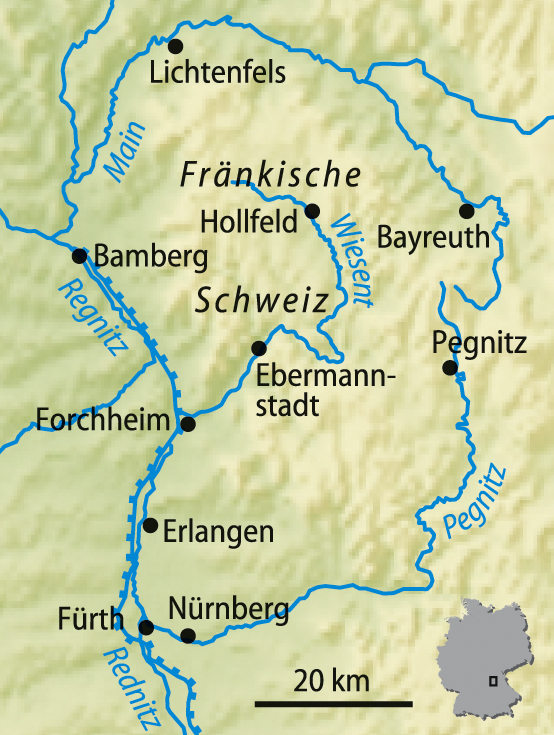

Location
- Country: Germany
- State: Bavaria

Physical characteristics
- Source
  - location: Franconian Switzerland
- Mouth
  - location: Regnitz
  - coordinates: 49°42′53″N 11°3′7″E
- Length: 78.8 km (49.0 mi)
- Basin size: 1,041 km^{2} (402 sq mi)

Basin features
- Progression: Regnitz→ Main→ Rhine→ North Sea

Wiesent (German pronunciation: [ˈviːzɛnt]) is a river located in Bavaria, Germany. It is a right tributary of the river Regnitz. It is the main river of the Franconian Switzerland region, rising near the village Steinfeld. It flows through the towns Hollfeld, Muggendorf and Ebermannstadt, and joins the Regnitz in Forchheim.

== See also ==
- List of rivers of Bavaria
