= Pottenstein =

Pottenstein may refer to:

- Pottenstein, Bavaria, a town in Bavaria, Germany
  - Pottenstein Castle, a castle therein
- Pottenstein, Austria, a town in the district of Baden in Lower Austria
- Potštejn, a village in the Czech Republic
