= Upper Tüchersfeld Castle =

Castle in Germany

- Pottenstein-Tüchersfeld
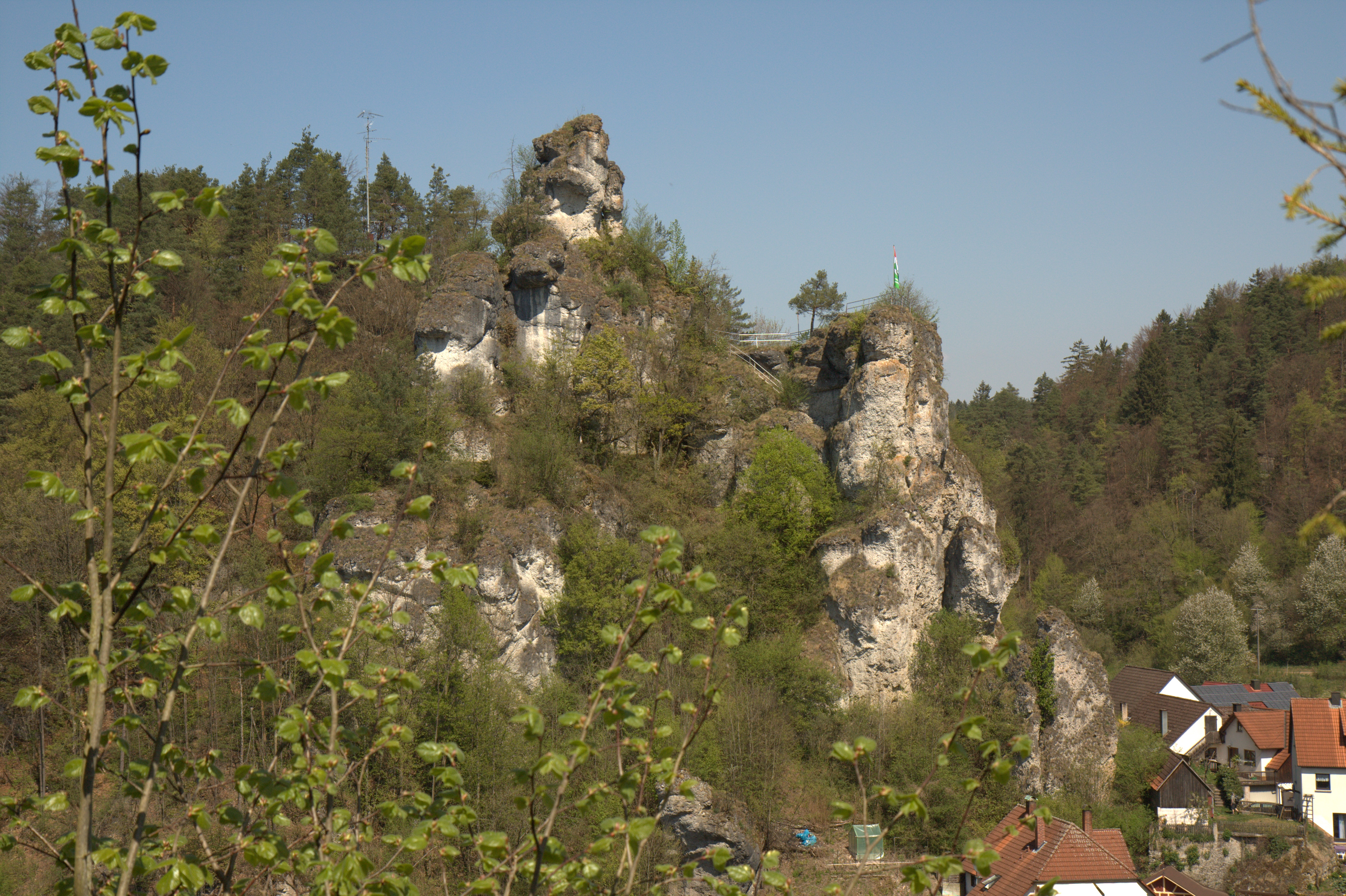
- Oberntüchersfeld Castle site - view of the castle rock from the SW

Site information
- Type: hill castle, spur castle
- Code: DE-BY
- Condition: burgstall (no above-ground ruins)

Location
- Coordinates: 49°47′09″N 11°21′36″E
- Height: 455 m above sea level (NN)

Site history
- Built: c. 1240

The ruins of Upper Tüchersfeld Castle (German: Burgstall Oberntüchersfeld) are all that remains of a high medieval castle that once rose high above the valley of the Püttlach in the church village of Tüchersfeld in Germany's Franconian Switzerland. It was built on a spur of the Mittelberg and was one of two castles in the village, the other being the Lower Tüchersfeld Castle.

The site or burgstall of the hill castle lies at a height of 455 m above sea level (NN) in the centre of the village of Tüchersfeld in the municipality of Pottenstein in the Upper Franconian county of Bayreuth in Bavaria.

== History ==
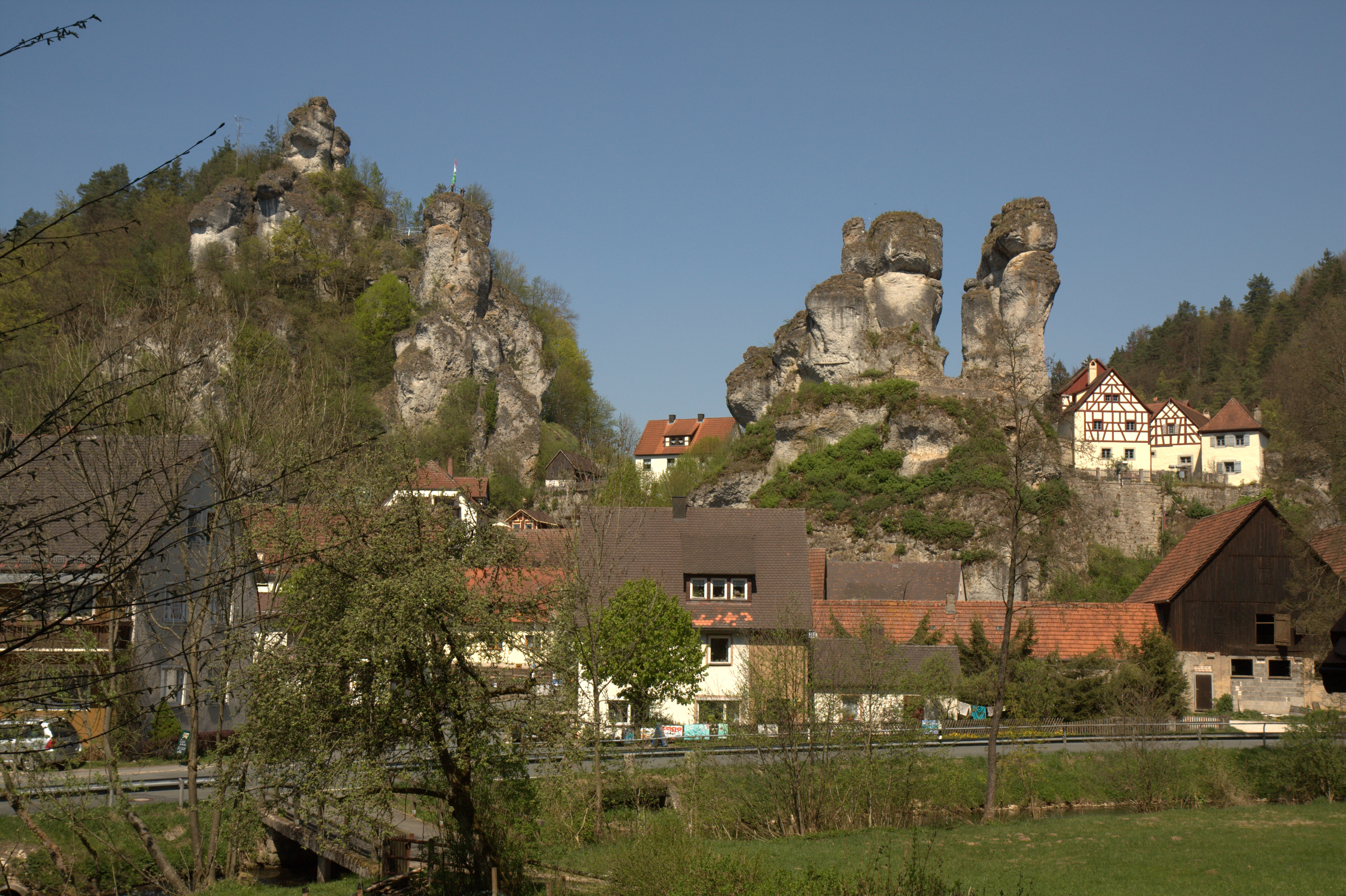
View of the two castle rocks in Tüchersfeld. Left: Upper Tüchersfeld, right: Lower Tüchersfeld

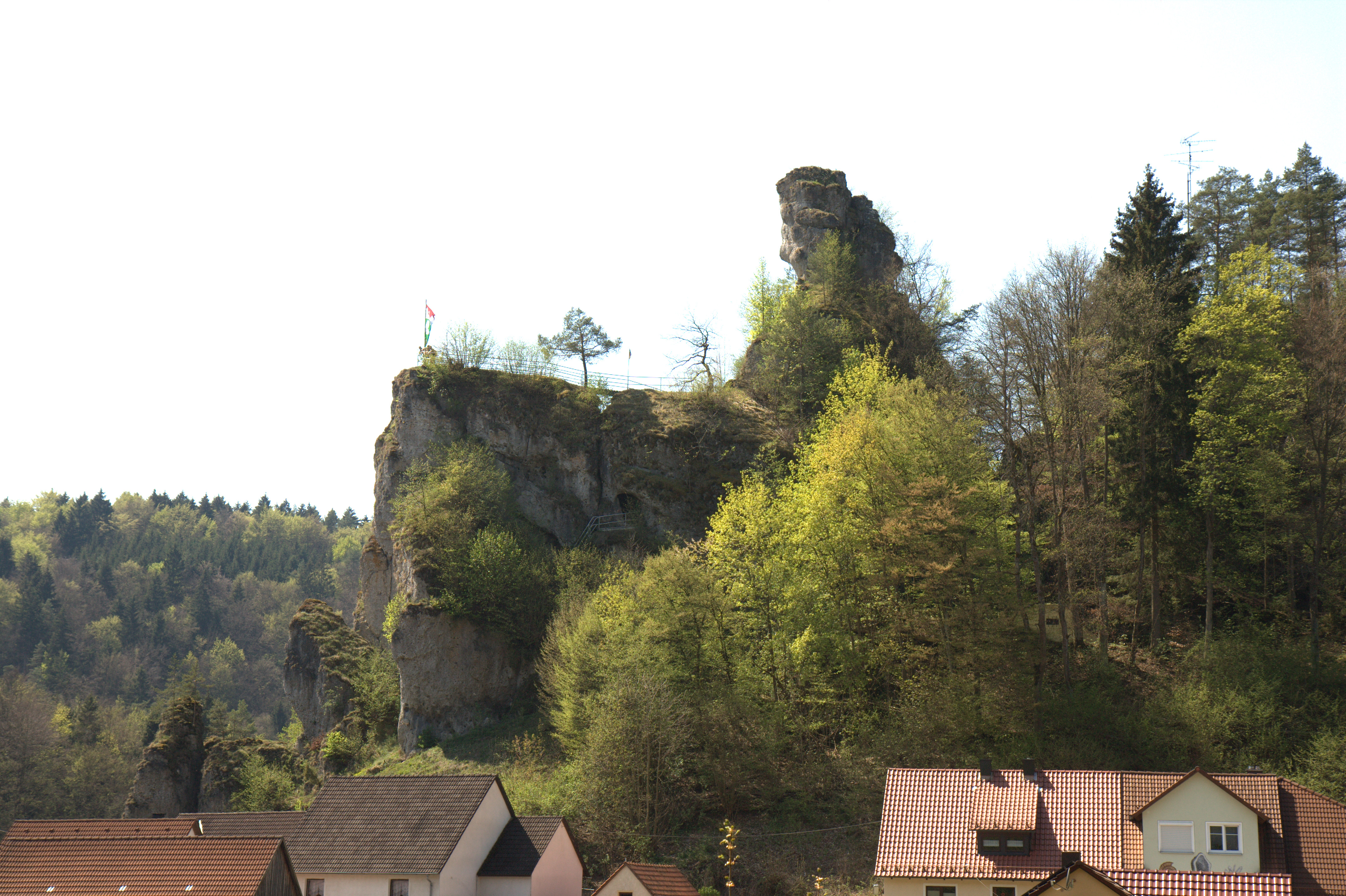
View of the southern part of the castle rock from the south east. Also visible is the access to the castle through a small cave

Through the village of Tüchersfeld once ran a medieval road (Altstrasse), which wound its way from Gräfenberg via Hiltpoltstein and Obertrubach to Gößweinstein. In Tüchersfeld it crossed the Püttlach valley and then continued via Oberailsfeld and Waischenfeld to Hollfeld. The castles were probably built to control the road and river crossing.

The first historical records of the castles date to the 13th century, when a Friderici quondam de Thvchervelt was mentioned on 26 November 1243, they were probably built just before this.

The Bishop of Bamberg, Berthold of Leiningen, acquired one of the castles on 27 May 1262; from whom he bought it, is not known. It is likely that this was the castle of Frederick of Tüchersfeld. Seven years later, the bishop acquired the second castle there from Duke Louis of Bavaria and Count Palatine of the Rhine, as a gift. However, the Duke must first have had to redeem the castle from Count Frederick Truhendingen, who at the time held it in fief. Prior to Truhendingen, Burkhard of Ahorn was the fief holder. The lords of the castle were the dukes of Bavarian dukes whose possessions in Tüchersfeld and Pottenstein came from the estate of Counts of Schweinfurt.

Ownership of the second castle was disputed. Henry, Duke of Bavaria and Count Palatine of the Rhine, laid claim to the fortress. In a treaty dated 26 February 1287, however, he renounced the castle in Tüchersfeld. From then on, both castles were in the hands of the Bishopric of Bamberg. In the episcopal Urbarium A of 1323/27 was added: "Tvchersuelt et Tvchersuelt ambo Castra sunt episcopi" (both castles in Tüchersfeld are the bishop's).

In the episcopal Urbarium B of 1348 for the first time a distinction was made between Upper Tüchersfeld, which stood on a narrow rock pinnacle, and Lower Tüchersfeld.

Even before the entry in Urbarium of A 1323/27 Burgoberbach Tüchersfeld was already the seat of a minor Bamberg office or Amt. No later than 1386, a court chamber (Kastenamt) was established at the castle and a Walter Hauger of Rattelsdorf was recorded as the Steward (Kastner) of Tüchersfeld. This office had moved by 1399 to Waischenfeld.

At that time, the castle consisted of two parts, an episcopal administrative castle (Amtsburg) that from 1442 was always referred to as a schloss, and the "Upper House" (Oberhaus), which probably stood on the northern part of the rock reef. The Upper House was an episcopal fief and was owned by the family Groß of Trockau. Eberhard Groß was mentioned in 1422, he owned half the castle estate at the Upper House. In 1429 a half of the Upper House was owned by Jorg Groß.

From 1445, the Upper House was apparently destroyed; an enfeoffment deed to the brothers, Sittig and Hans Groß, in that year talks about the "Upper House of Tüchersfeld called the burgstall [= "castle site"]". The castle was apparently destroyed during the Hussite wars in 1430, and subsequently referred to in documents as a burgstall, the name for a castle that had been virtually levelled. In addition, in other enfeoffments to Sittig Groß from 1461, reference is made to a house that he is supposed to have built; whether this house stood on the castle site is not known. Sittig Groß had to sell the ruins of the Upper House in 1480 to his nephews, the brothers Andrew, Fritz and Jerome of Seckendorff-Rinhofen. "for reasons and the needs of his body to pay for its nourishment". A year later, the flattened castle was back in feudal possession of Albert, James, Eberhard and Michael Gross; and it was owned by the family until 1628. The part of the castle called the Upper House was apparently not rebuilt after its destruction by the Hussites, only the site continued to be enfeoffed by the bishop

== Today ==
The site of the old castle is covered in dense woodland in places; only the southern tip of the rock reef is free of large trees. This rock tower is now a viewing point and is accessible on a metal ladder. Very little of the original castle has survived. At the entrance to the southern tip of the reef, steps may be seen that have been hewn out of the rock in a small through cave. On the castle plateau a few foundation wall remains can be seen.

== Conservation ==
Described by the Bavarian State Office for Monument Protection (BLfD) as a "medieval burgstall", the protected monument bear the identity D-4-6234-0037.

== Gallery ==
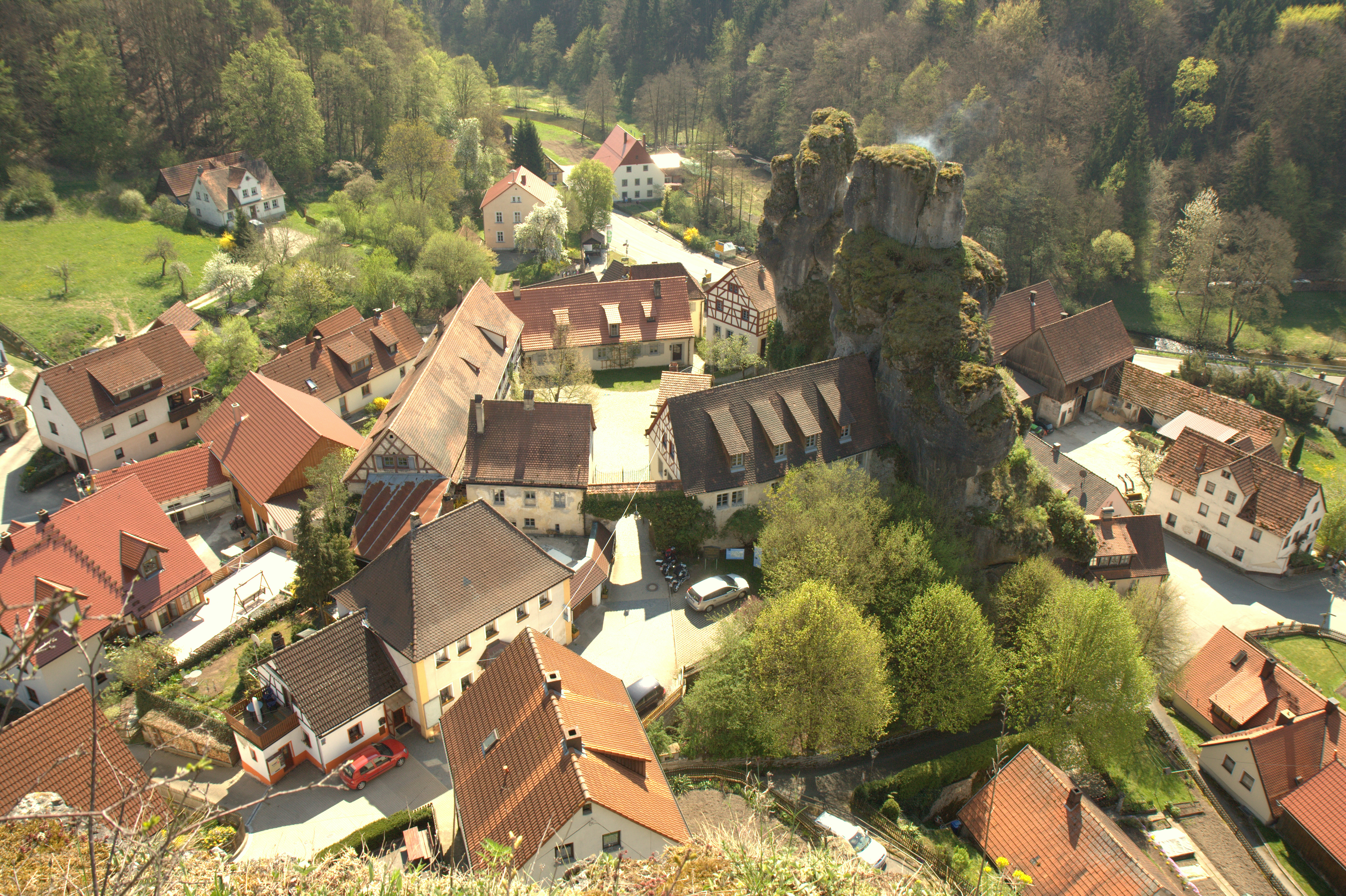
View of the Upper Castle from the Lower Castle site

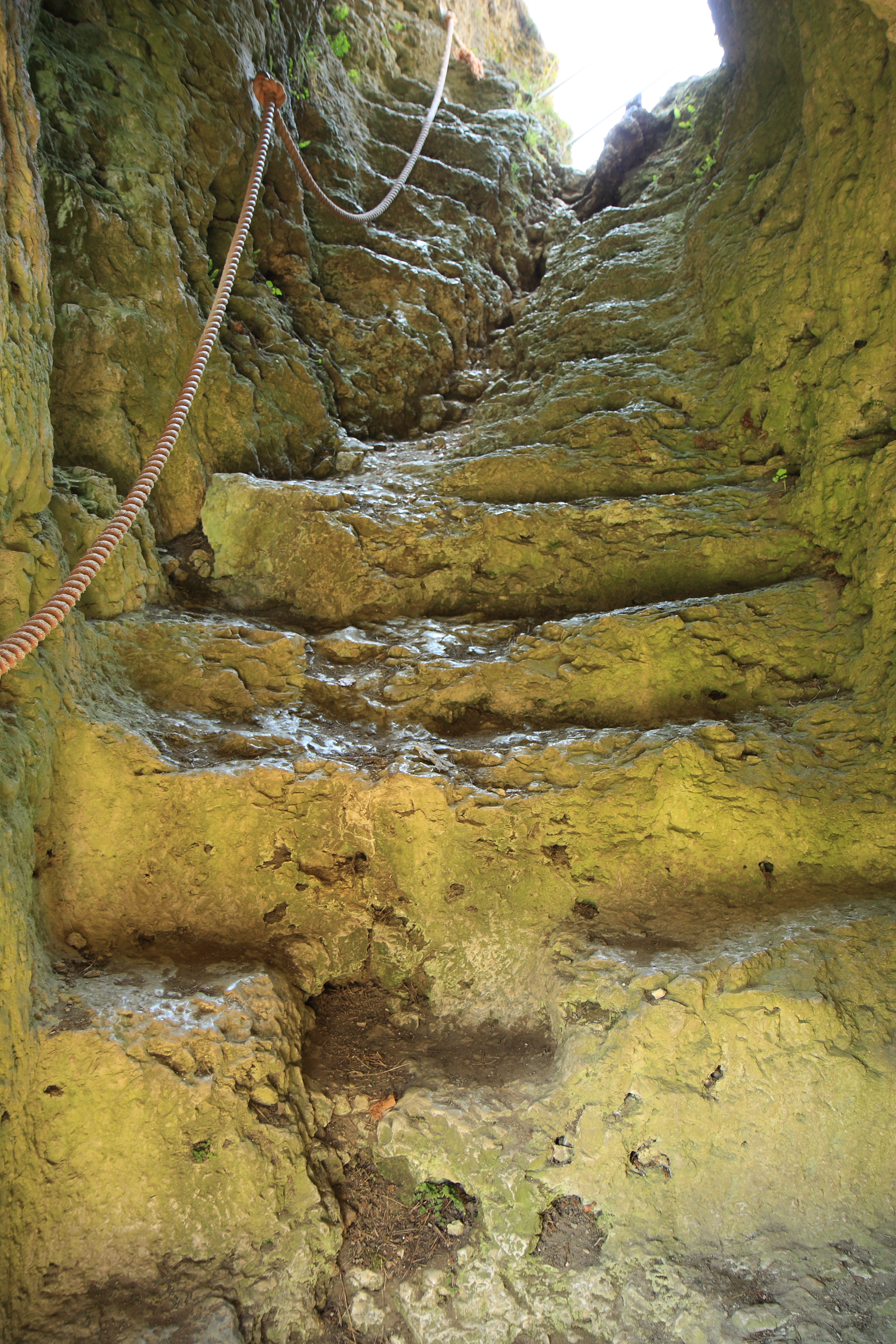
Ascent to the ruins on the southern spur through a small cave with steps hewn out of the rock

== Literature ==
- Rüdiger Bauriedel, Ruprecht Konrad-Röder: Mittelalterliche Befestigungen und niederadelige Ansitze im Landkreis Bayreuth. Ellwanger Druck und Verlag, Bayreuth, 2007, ISBN 978-3-925361-63-0, p. 138.
- Gutav Voit, Walter Rüfer: Eine Burgenreise durch die Fränkische Schweiz – Auf den Spuren des Zeichners A. F. Thomas Ostertag. 2nd edn. Verlag Palm & Enke, Erlangen, 1991, ISBN 3-7896-0064-4, pp. 192–196.
- Rainer Hofmann (rev.): Führer zu archäologischen Denkmälern in Deutschland, Band 20: Fränkische Schweiz. Konrad Theiss Verlag, Stuttgart, 1990, ISBN 3-8062-0586-8, pp. 218–219.
- Hellmut Kunstmann: Die Burgen der östlichen Fränkischen Schweiz. Kommissionsverlag Ferdinand Schöningh, Würzburg, 1965, p. 303–324.
- Toni Eckert, Susanne Fischer, Renate Freitag, Rainer Hofmann, Walter Tausendpfund: Die Burgen der Fränkischen Schweiz – Ein Kulturführer. Gürtler Druck, Forchheim o.J., ISBN 3-9803276-5-5, pp. 160–164.
