= Kohlstein Castle =

- Gößweinstein-Kohlstein
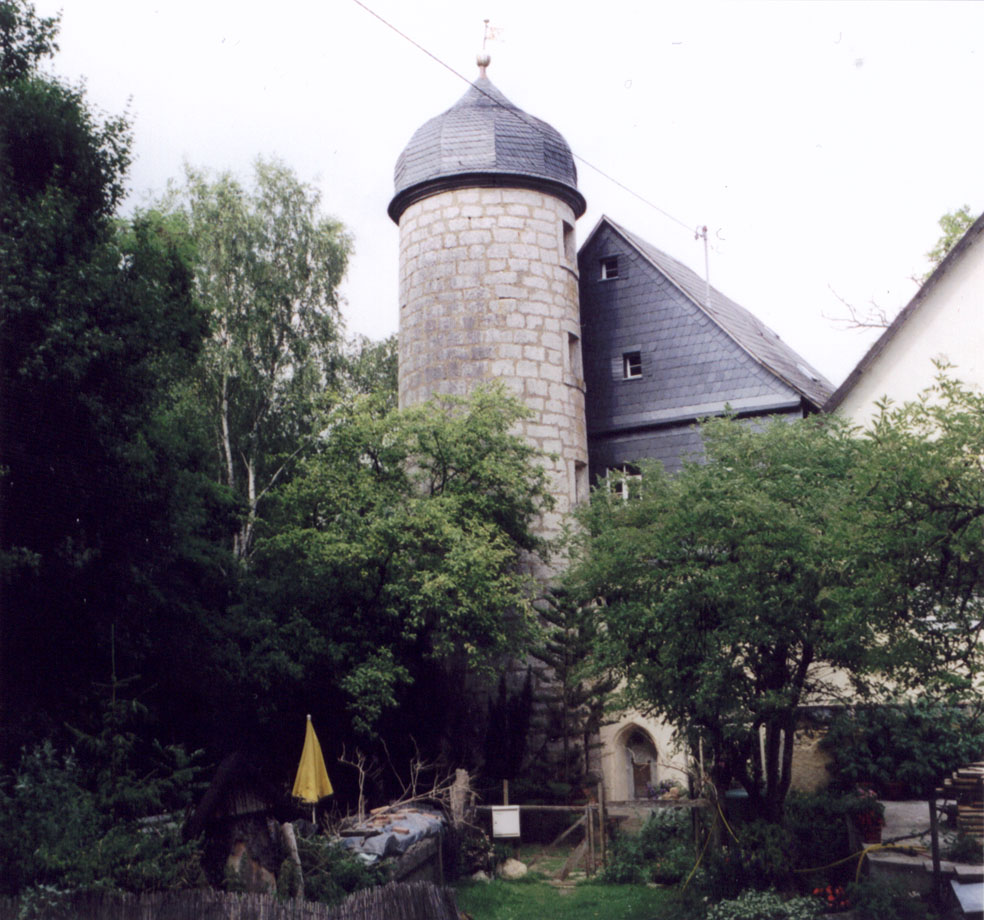
- Main building of Kohlstein Castle with its staircase tower (2003)

Site information
- Type: hill castle, village location
- Code: DE-BY
- Condition: preserved or largely preserved

Location
- Location within Bavaria Location within Germany
- Coordinates: 49°47′17.88″N 11°20′54.24″E
- Height: 440 m above sea level (NN)

Site history
- Built: around 1485

Kohlstein Castle (German: Burg Kohlstein) is situated on a rocky hillock in the village of Kohlstein northwest of Tüchersfeld and is the most recently built castle in Franconian Switzerland. It is also one of the smallest and most romantic castles. Today it is in private ownership and may not be visited.

== History ==
The hill castle stands at a height of 440 m above sea level (NN) and may have been built around 1486 by Conz of Hirschaid. It was probably originally an allodial estate of the Lords of Hirschaid. Later, feudal sovereignty passed to the Bishopric of Bamberg.

In 1525 was destroyed in the Peasants' War. It was immediately rebuilt. In 1607/1608 the Hirschaid family had to sell their barony as they were short of money. On 23 May 1608 Wolf Philipp Groß von Trockau zu Tüchersfeld was enfeoffed with the castle and lordship. During the Thirty Years' War the castle appears to have been destroyed because in 1636 a modest new structure was built. It was comprehensively renovated between 1707 and 1714.

A garden house was probably built at this time, which was converted in 1743 into a castle and village chapel.

The Groß von Trockau family, who called themselves from 1658 zu Kohlstein und Tüchersfeld, had to sell the castle in 1713 to Otto Philipp von Gutenberg. After his death, his niece, Maria Anna Groß von Trockau, inherited the castle and estate.

The current structure, a residential building with attached tower, dates mainly to the 18th century. The tower was renovated in 1890.

In 1961 the Groß von Trockau family sold the castle, but not its associated chapel. The castle has had several owners since then.

Today the castle is protected as listed building no. D-4-74-129-42 a "schloss, the core dating to 1486, rebuilt after destruction in the Peasants' War, three-storey main building, in 1636 with the core of the 15th/16th century, east side with irregular triangular end, covered, round staircase tower, renovated in 1890; covered passageway to a two-storey outbuilding, 18th/19th century" and as area monument no. D-4-6234-0175 "Subterranean structures of the Late Mediaeval and Early Modern schloss of Kohlstein" by the Bavarian State Officer for Monument Protection.

== Literature ==
- Kai Kellermann: Herrschaftliche Gärten in der Fränkischen Schweiz - Eine Spurensuche. Verlag Palm & Enke, Erlangen/ Jena, 2008, ISBN 978-3-7896-0683-0, pp. 114–117.
- Gustav Voit, Walter Rüfer: Eine Burgenreise durch die Fränkische Schweiz. Verlag Palm und Enke, Erlangen, 1991, ISBN 3-7896-0064-4, pp. 101–103.
- Toni Eckert, Susanne Fischer, Renate Freitag, Rainer Hofmann, Walter Tausendpfund: Die Burgen der Fränkischen Schweiz, Ein Kulturführer. Gürtler Druck, Forchheim, 1997, ISBN 3-9803276-5-5, pp. 82–85.
- Hellmut Kunstmann: Die Burgen der östlichen Fränkischen Schweiz. Kommissionsverlag Ferdinand Schöningh, Würzburg 1965, DNB-IDN 452649552, pp. 294–303.
