= Johann Baptist Reus =

Jesuit priest

Johann Baptist Reus or João Batista Reus (10 July 1868 – 21 July 1947) was a Jesuit priest and a German-Brazilian religious leader.

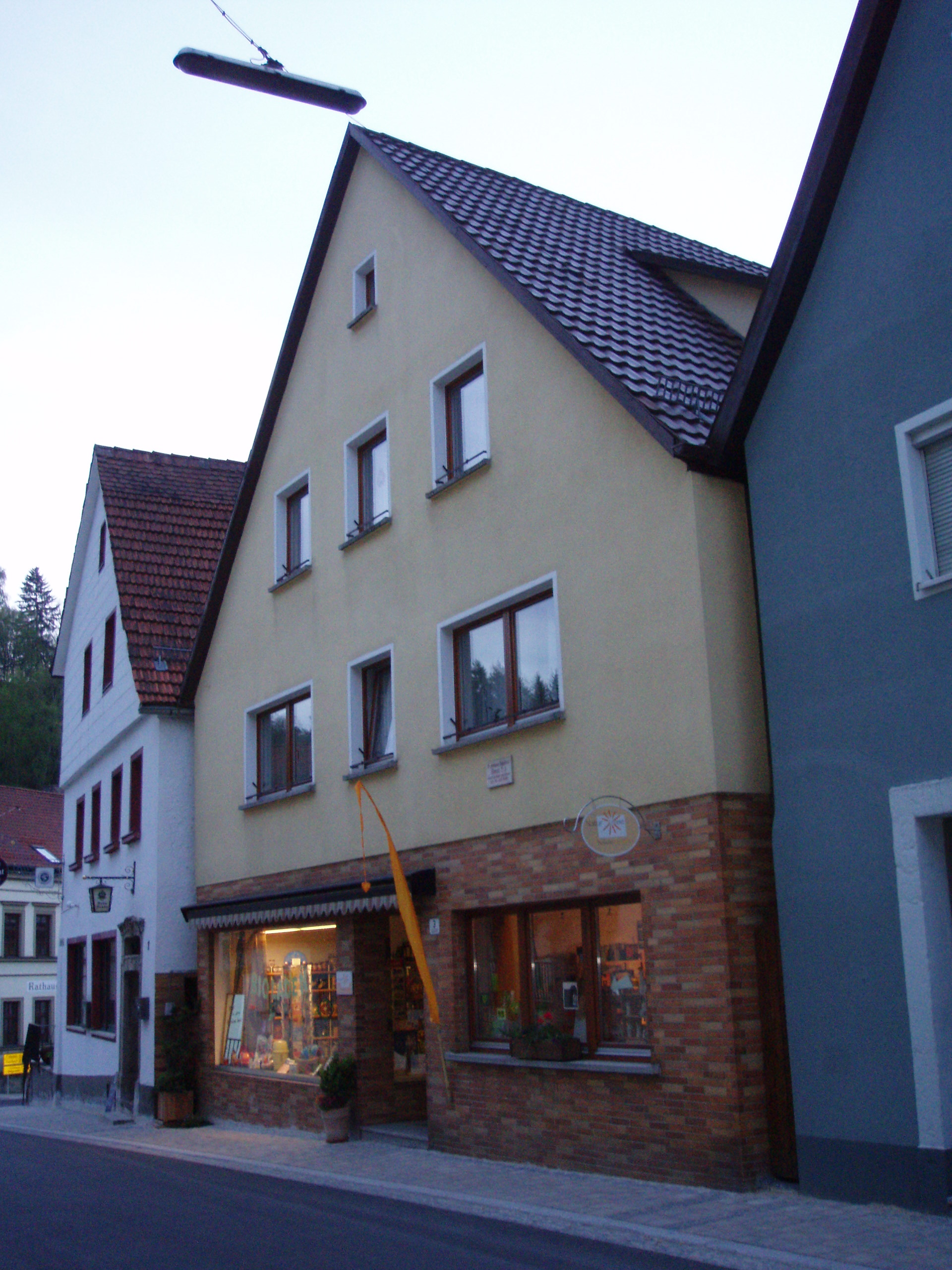
Birthplace of Reus at Pottenstein

== Life ==
John Baptist Reus was born to John and Ana Margarida Reus on 10 July 1868 in Pottenstein, Bavaria, the eighth child of 11 children. His parents, gave him excellent religious education. After completing a year of required military service, he resigned his commission 1890 and entered the Seminary of Bamberg, with an eye to eventually joining the Jesuits. He was ordained priest in 1893 entered the Order shortly thereafter.

Reus was ordained a priest in 1893, joined the Society of Jesus and was then sent to the Jesuit novitiate in Bligenbeek in the Netherlands. In May 1900, after completing his studies, he was sent to Brazil. He was a theology teacher for many years at the Cristo Rei college, located in the city of São Leopoldo in the state of Rio Grande do Sul.

His autobiography and diary, written in obedience to superiors, record mystical graces, and visions. He preferred to celebrate Mass in a private chapel because of his many ecstasies during Mass. Only after fifty years as a priest did he agreed to celebrate Mass in a public chapel, because the religious community asked him to. He died in São Leopoldo, Brazil.

Reus wrote many books about theology and the natural sciences in many languages: in Portuguese, Spanish, German, Italian and English. His Diário Espiritual (spiritual diary) and Autobiografia (autobiography) reveal his unique mystical state of being. His Liturgy Course was a classical text-book used by priests for the purpose of learning how to celebrate the liturgy.

== Beatification process ==
Upon the opening of his beatification process in June 1953, Reus has been titled a Servant of God.
