= Ailsbach =

River in Germany

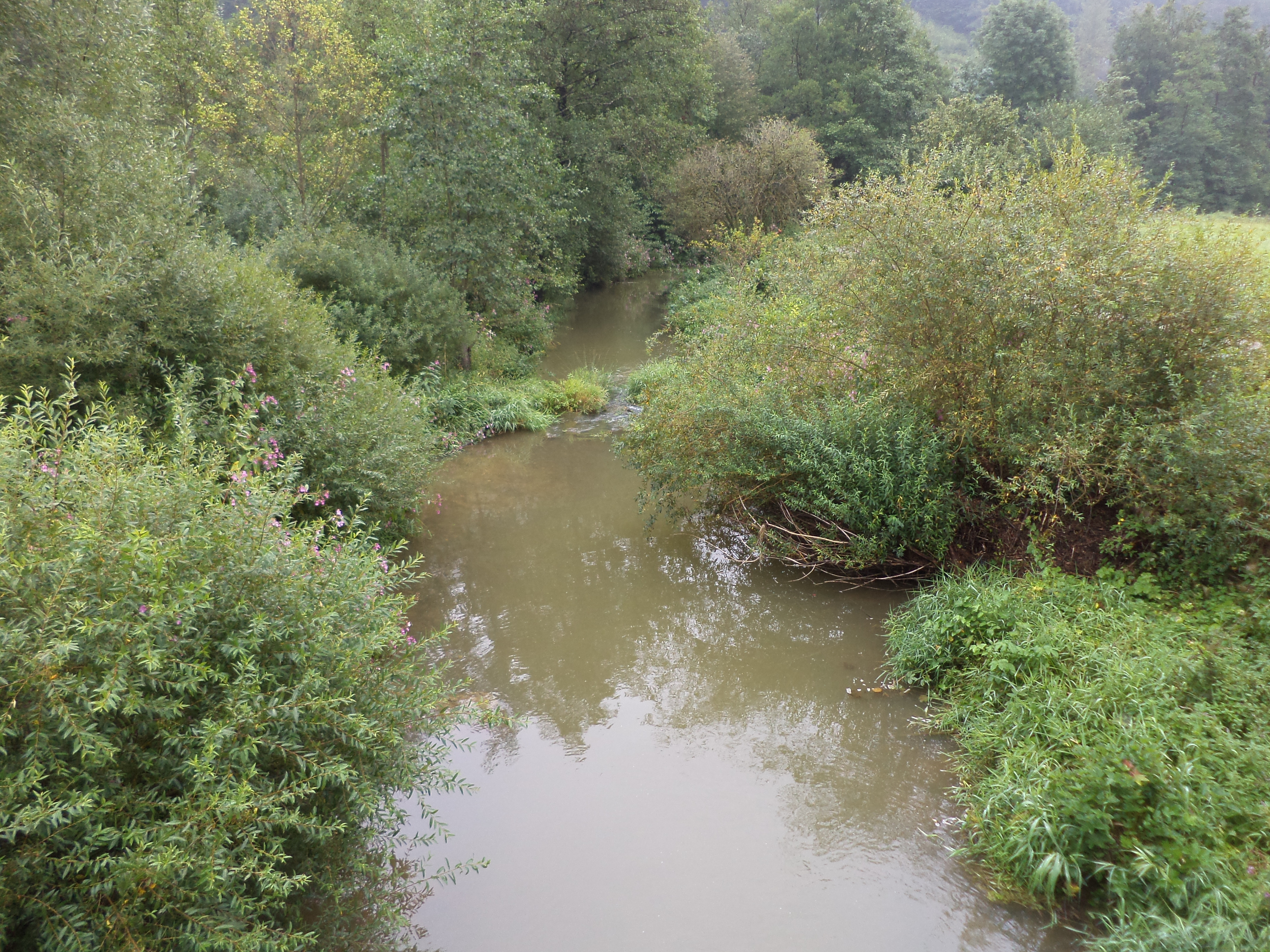
- The Ailsbach at Behringersmühle

- Location of mouth

Location
- Country: Germany
- State: Bavaria

Physical characteristics
- Mouth
  - location: Püttlach
  - coordinates: 49.7811°N 11.3350°E
- Length: 19.1 km (11.9 mi)

Basin features
- Progression: Püttlach→ Wiesent→ Regnitz→ Main→ Rhine→ North Sea

The Ailsbach is a river of Bavaria, Germany. The 19.1-km long Ailsbach flows into the Püttlach near Gößweinstein.

== See also ==
- List of rivers of Bavaria
