= Lower Tüchersfeld Castle =

Castle in Germany

- Pottenstein-Tüchersfeld
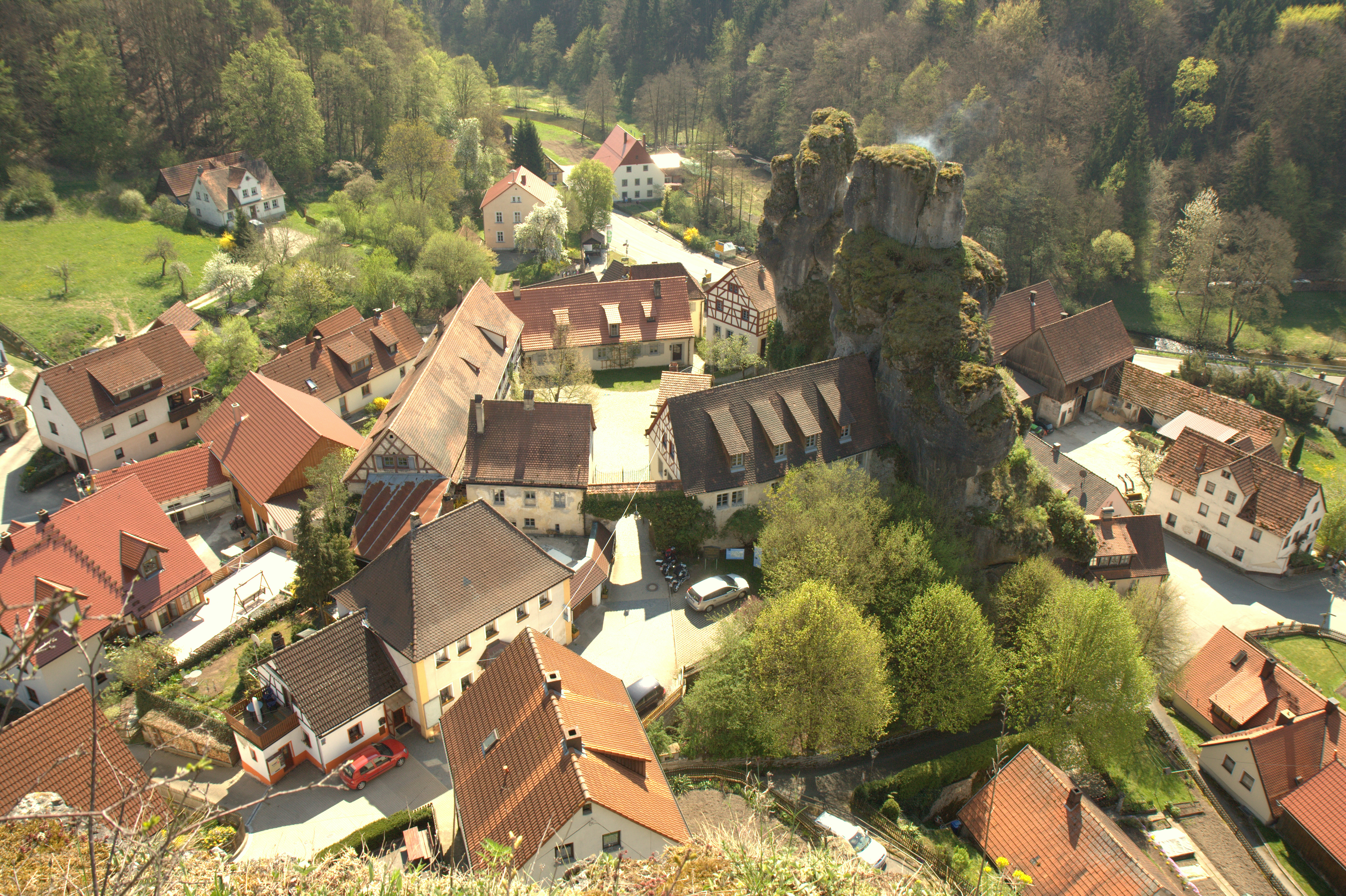
- Lower Tüchersfeld Castle – aerial view of the site

Site information
- Type: hill castle, spur castle
- Code: DE-BY
- Condition: ruins, wall remains

Location
- Coordinates: 49°47′07″N 11°21′38″E
- Height: Height missing, see template documentation

Site history
- Built: 13th century

Garrison information
- Occupants: clergy

Lower Tüchersfeld Castle (German: Burgruine Niederntüchersfeld) was one of the two castles in the church village of Tüchersfeld in the region of Franconian Switzerland in Bavaria, Germany. The ruins of this spur castle are situated on a rock pinnacle in the centre of the village of Dorfes Tüchersfeld in the municipality of Pottenstein in the Upper Franconian county of Bayreuth. On the rock tower behind it are the remains of Upper Tüchersfeld Castle.

The castle was first built in the 13th century and mentioned in 1269. On 27 May 1262 the Bishop of Bamberg, Berthold of Leiningen, bought the castle.

In addenda to episcopal Urbarium B of 1348, the two castles at Tüchersfeld were first distinguished by name; the upper castle was the seat of a district or Amt established before 1323–27, the lower castle was a fief, owned by Groß of Trockau.

In 1430, the castle was destroyed in the Hussite wars and rebuilt by the fief holder, Groß. In 1525, the castle was razed during the Peasants' War, and, in 1636, it was finally destroyed in the Thirty Years' War. In 1691 it was designated in the official description as "totally desolate". Around 1700 a Jewish settlement was established in the remaining ruins and, in 1755, 44 Jews lived there. The Jewish settlement in the Lower Castle was destroyed by fire in 1758. the remains of the old buildings were included in the newly constructed buildings of 1758–1762,

In 1959, the remaining parts of the site, now called the "Jew's Court" or Judenhof, were sold to private individuals. After the site was completely renovated in 1981 to 1983, the Franconian Switzerland Museum opened in 1985.

Of the old castle only a few wall remains and a rock tower have survived.

== Literature ==
- Toni Eckert, Susanne Fischer, Renate Freitag, Rainer Hofmann, Walter Tausendpfund: Die Burgen der Fränkischen Schweiz – Ein Kulturführer. Gürtler Druck, Forchheim o.J., ISBN 3-9803276-5-5, pp. 160–164.
