= Püttlach =

River in Germany

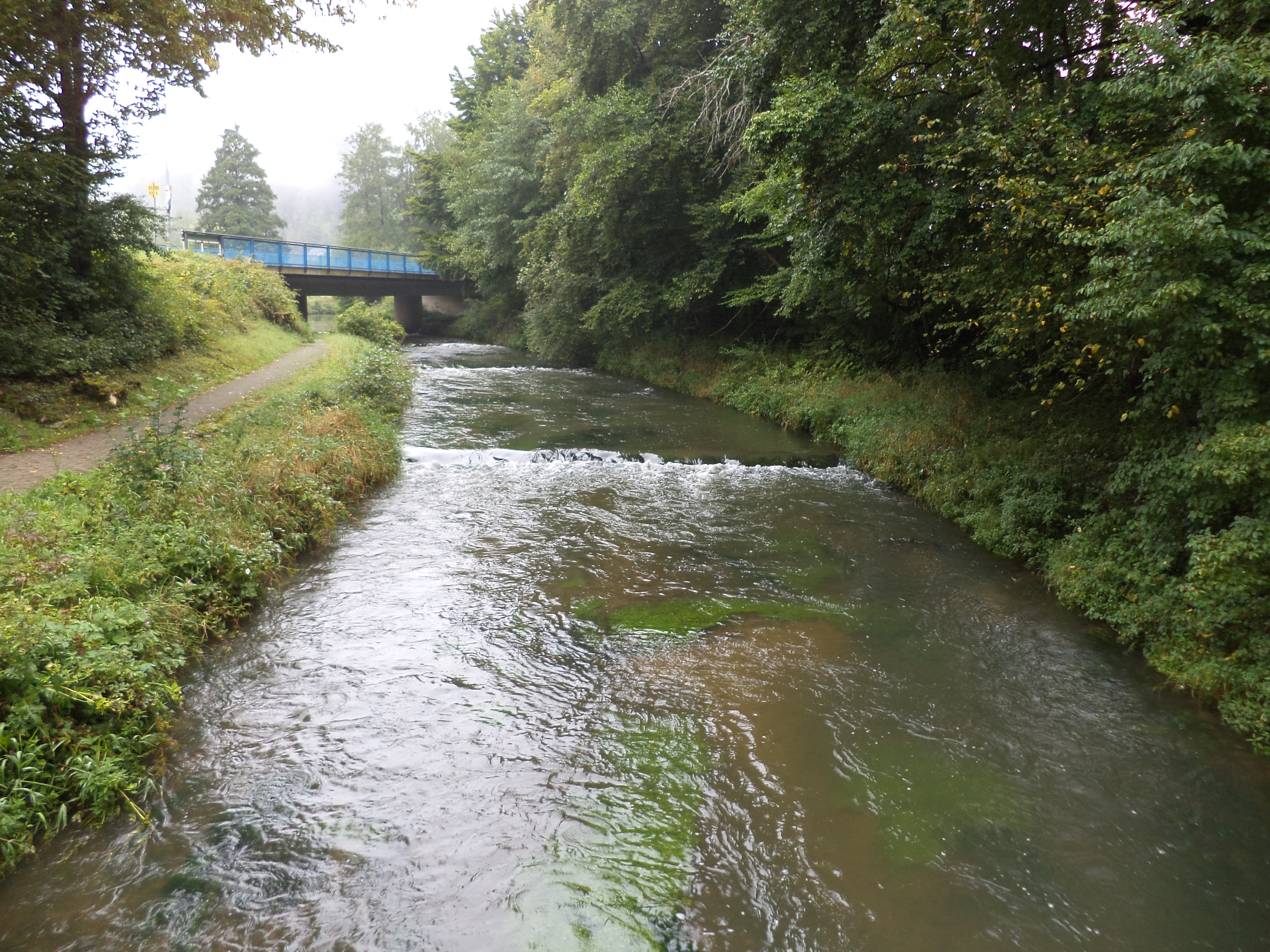
- The Püttlach at the mill in Behringersmühle

Location
- Country: Germany
- State: Bavaria
- District: Upper Franconia
- Reference no.: DE: 24246

Physical characteristics
- Source
  - location: in Franconian Switzerland, south of Hummeltal-Bärnreuth
  - coordinates: 49°51′43″N 11°30′17″E
  - elevation: ca. 545 m above sea level (NN)
- Mouth
  - location: near Gößweinstein-Behringersmühle into the Wiesent
  - coordinates: 49°46′41″N 11°20′07″E
  - elevation: ca. 324 m above sea level (NN)
- Length: 26.7 km (16.6 mi)
- Basin size: 199.7 km^{2} (77.1 sq mi)

Basin features
- Progression: Wiesent→ Regnitz→ Main→ Rhine→ North Sea
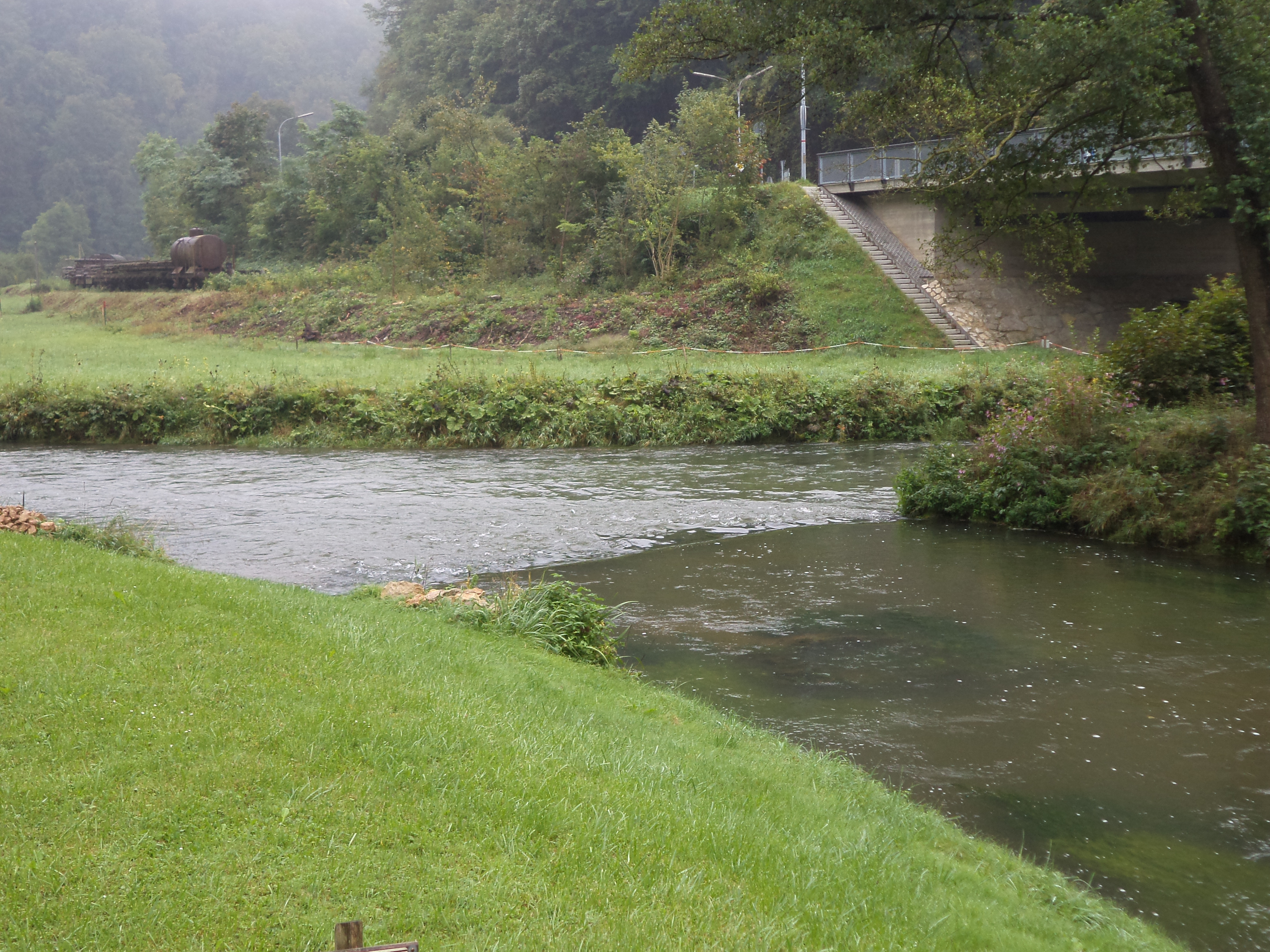
- The Püttlach (front right) empties into the Wiesent (from r to l)

The Püttlach is a left tributary of the River Wiesent. It is about 27 km (17 mi) long and flows through the Bavarian region of Franconian Switzerland in Germany.

== Geography ==
=== Course ===
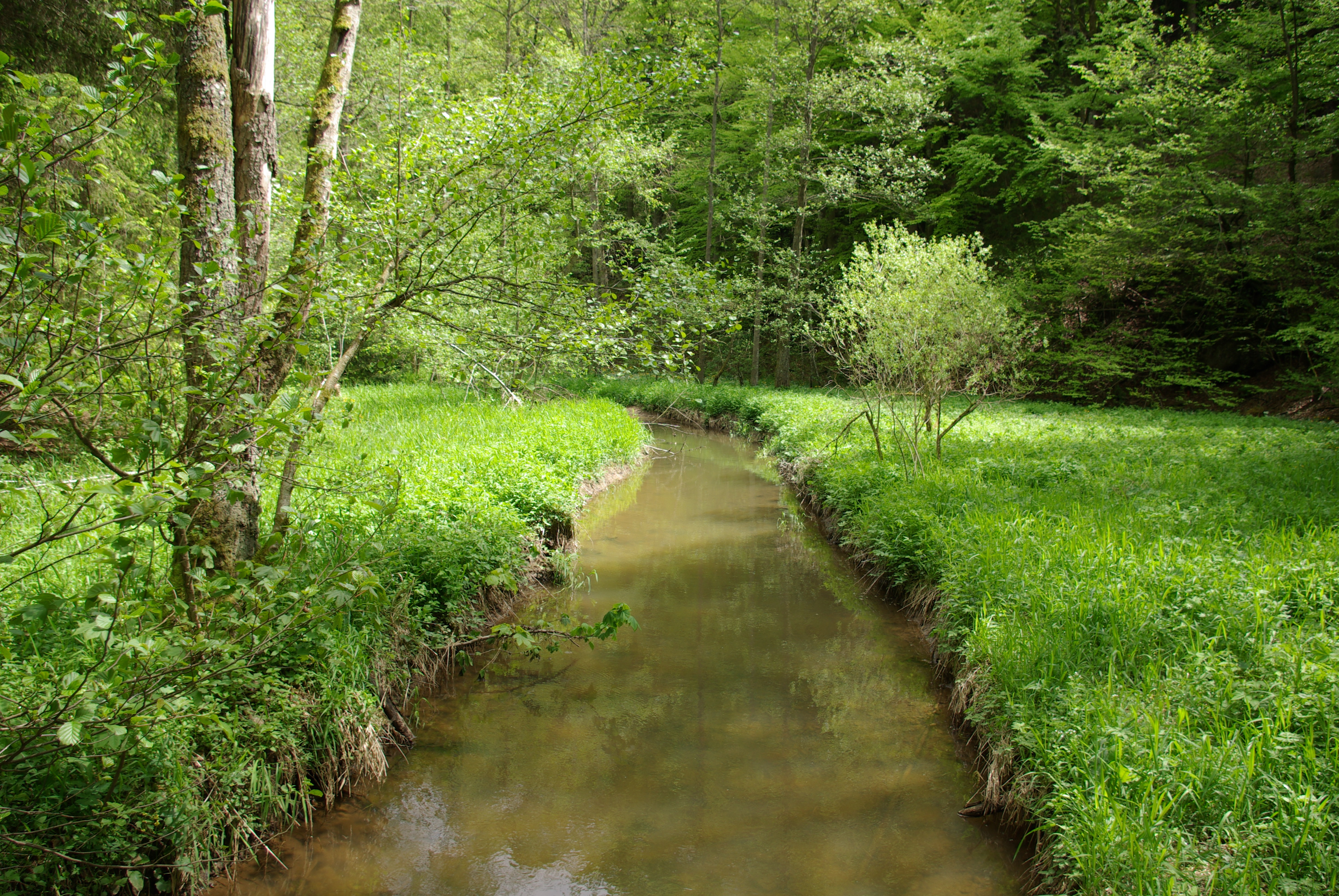
The Püttlach in the Upper Püttlach Valley in Pottenstein

The Püttlach rises in Franconian Switzerland, south of Bärnreuth at a height of about 545 m above sea level (NN) within the parish of Lindenhardter Forst-Nordwest, near the source of the Red Main and origin of the Fichtenohe, a headstream source of the Pegnitz river. It initially flows northwest to the Pond (Püttlachweiher). There it turns sharply to the south and flows through woods. In Muthmannsreuth, it is fed from the left by the Heringsbach and, at Heringslohe, from the right by the Heroldsgraben. West of Trockau is the Herrenmühle and, in the vicinity, a sewage treatment plant. Just south of a second mill, the Heddelmühle, it is joined from the right by the Kohlbrunnbach. Near the Hasenloch it is fed from the right by the Pullendorfer Bächlein brook. It flows through the eponymous parish of Püttlach in the borough of Pottenstein. To the south of the town it makes its way through fields and meadows to an area with many small ponds. There it is boosted from the left by the Grießbach stream. It continues to flow south through a deep valley to the Hollenberg Forest. Blocked by a hill range, it turns 90 degrees to the west before cutting through the ridge and passes through the upper Püttlach valley, past the Adamsfels Cave as far as Pottenstein. In the town, the Weiherbach joins the Püttlach from the left. Nearby is another mill and, on the western edge of the town, the hammer mill. The Püttlach now flows westwards through a narrow gorge and empties into the Wiesent at Behringersmühle where the Ailsbach (or Aßbach) joins from the right (mouth height approximately 324 m above sea level (NN)).

=== Tributaries ===
- Heringsbach (left)
- Heroldsgraben (right)
- Kohlbrunnbach (right)
- Pullendorfer Bächlein (right)
- Bodendorfer Bach (left)
- Grießbach (left)
- Haselbrunnbach (right)
- Weihersbach (left)
- Ailsbach (right)

=== Püttlach Valley ===
The Püttlach Valley has been incised deep into the countryside of the Franconian Jura and has many prominent rock formations. In the valley lie the settlements of Pottenstein and Tüchersfeld; in both places some of the houses are built directly on or against the rocks.

== Nature ==
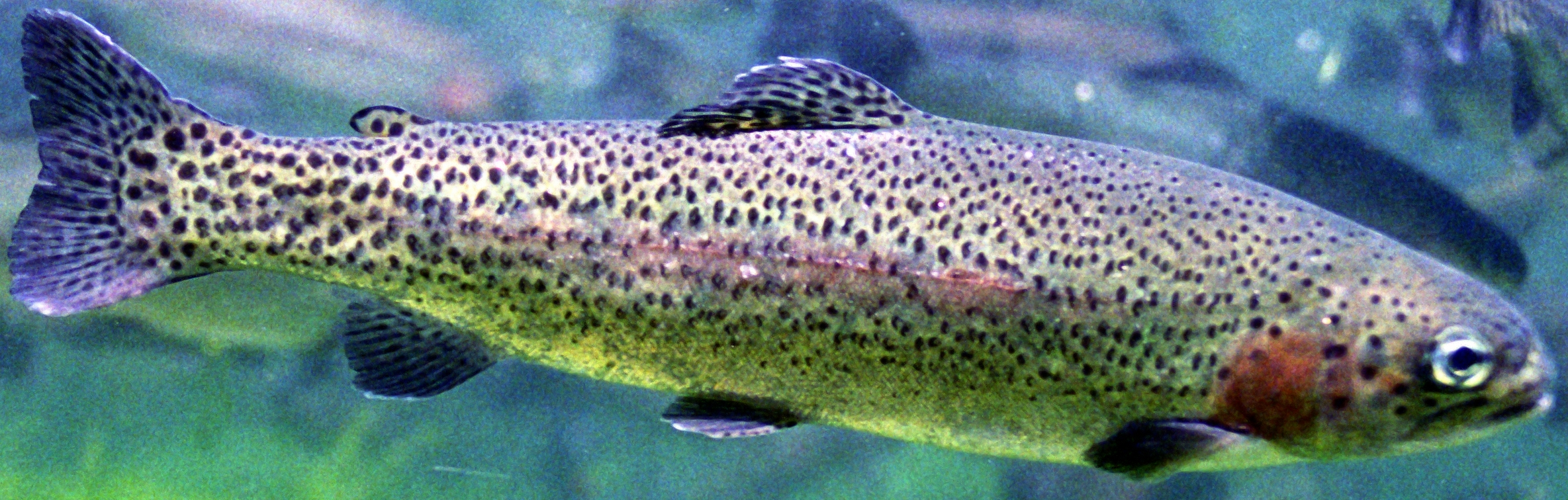
Rainbow trout

=== Fauna ===
Fish

The Püttlach, along with the Wiesent, is rich in fish, which include the following:

- Trout (rainbow trout, river trout), carp, tench, chub, perch, eels and various species of white fish.

Shrimps

- Signal crayfish, spinycheek crayfish

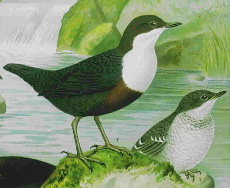
Dipper

Birds

- Among the birds that live along the Püttlach Valley are dippers.

=== Flora ===
- Notable plant species of the Püttlach Valley include orchids, marsh-marigolds, Greek anemones, cowslips and pasque flowers.

== See also ==
- List of rivers of Bavaria
