= Tüchersfeld =

- Village of Pottenstein
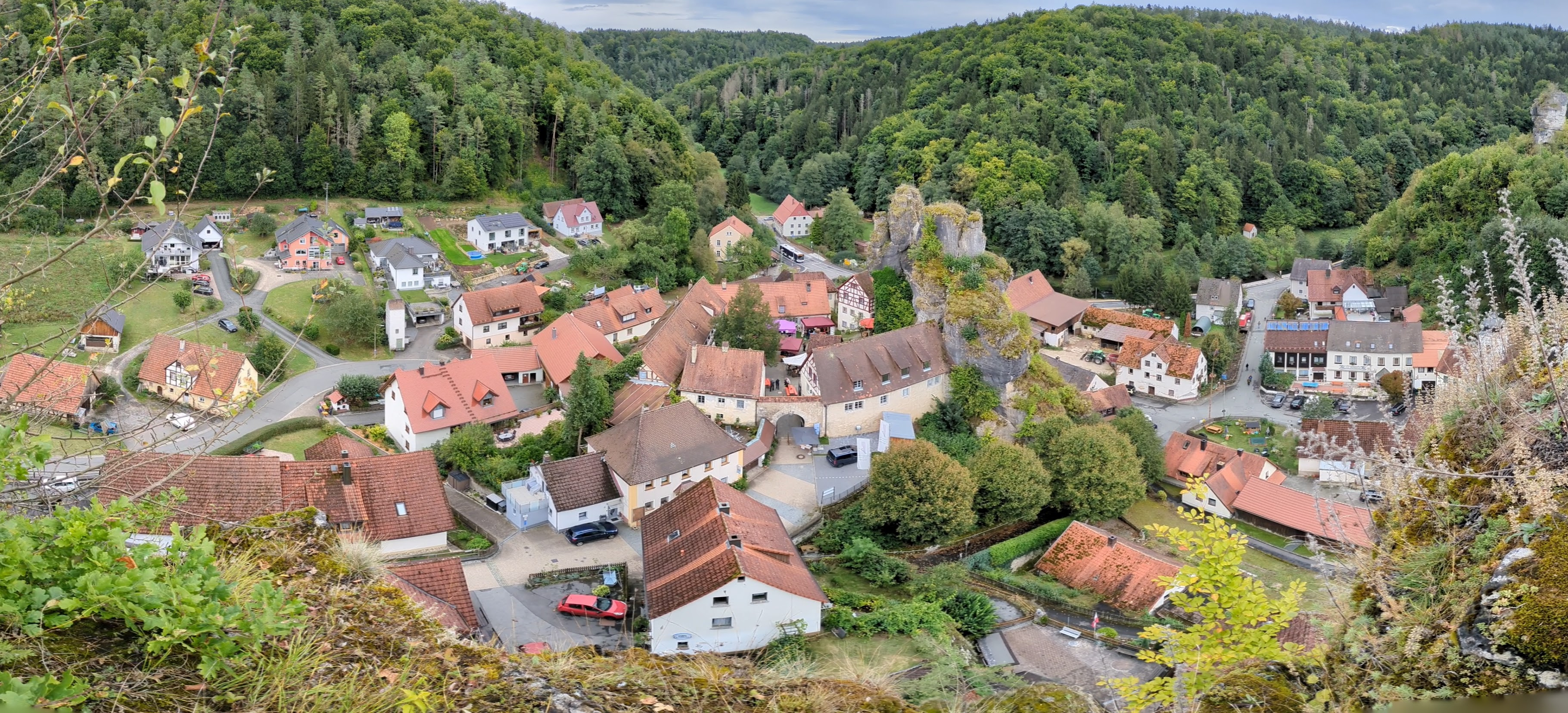
- Interactive map of Tüchersfeld
- Location within Germany Location within Bavaria
- Coordinates: 49°47′9″N 11°21′39″E
- Country: Germany
- State: Bavaria
- District: Bayreuth
- Town: Pottenstein
- Elevation: 337 m (1,106 ft)
- Time zone: UTC+01:00 (CET)
  - Summer (DST): UTC+02:00 (CEST)
- Postal codes: 91278
- Dialling codes: 09243

Tüchersfeld is a church village in the Püttlach valley in Franconian Switzerland and belongs to the town of Pottenstein.

== Geography ==
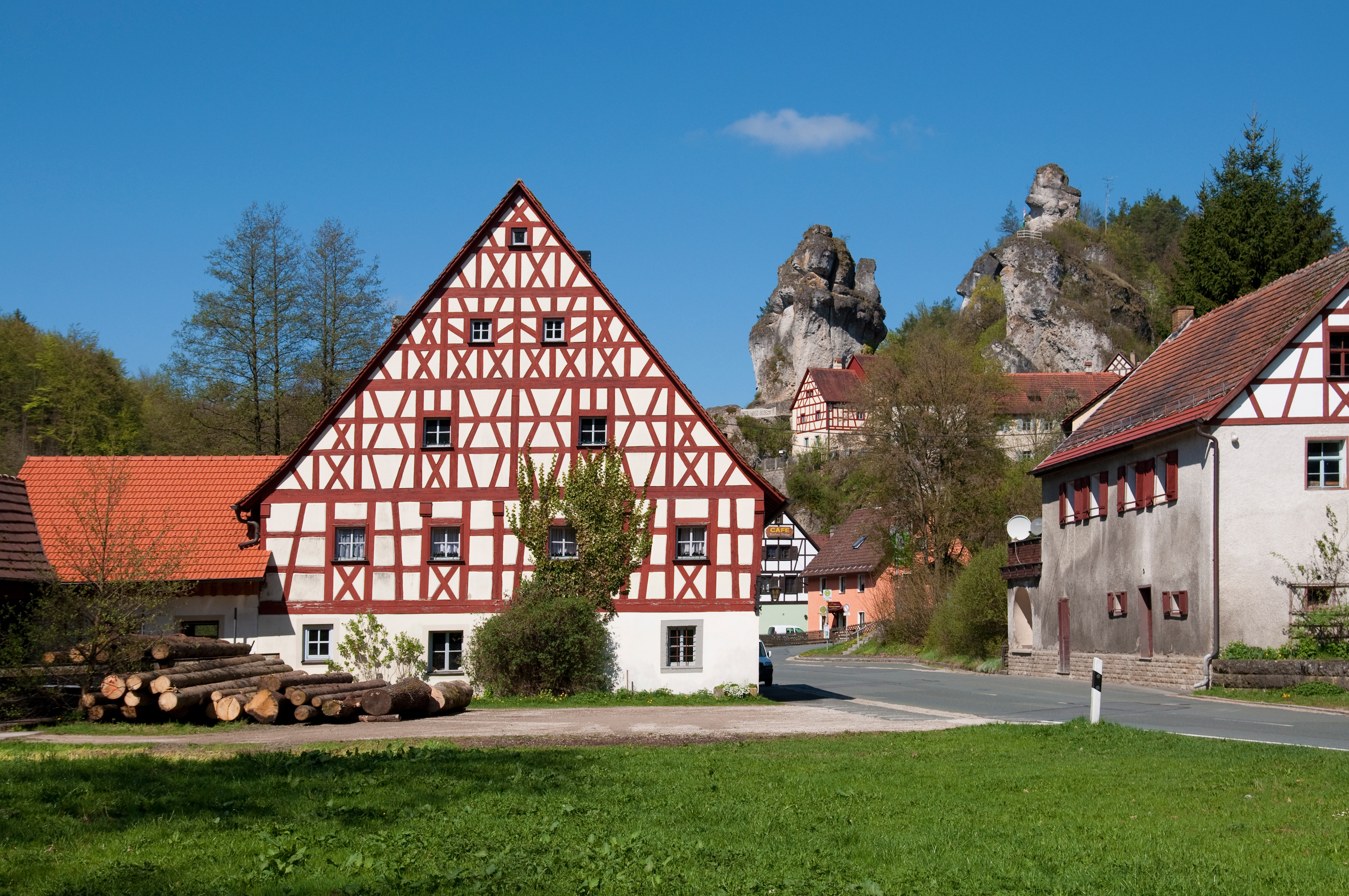
Entrance to Tüchersfeld on Burgenstraße (B 470) from Pottenstein

Due to the prominent rocks (sponge reefs in cone karst shapes) of a meander cutoff hill, which emerged as the result of the uplifting of the Franconian Jura in the Late Tertiary and the deposition of a thick bed of sand in the Upper Cretaceous, and its timber-framed-houses, which appear in places to be glued onto the rocks, Tüchersfeld is a symbol of Franconian Switzerland and has also been portrayed on postage stamps of the Deutsche Post. Until the Thirty Years' War there were two castles here, the Upper and Lower Castles, the latter was recorded in 1269 as a fortress that had already been in existence for a long time.

== History ==
The Franconian Switzerland Museum is housed in the old Judenhof ("Jews Court"), a group of 17th- and 18th-century buildings built by Jews on the grounds of the Lower Castle and inhabited until 1860 by 18 Jewish families, and restored in 1978–1982. Of particular note is the synagogue from the second half of the 18th century (around 1763) with its simple Late Baroque stucco work on the ceiling; of the original decoration little can be seen after decades of alienation.

The Catholic chapel of ease, the Church of the Sacred Heart, was built in 1950-51 thanks to a foundation; with the tower it is attached to another building. Behind the altar is a painting by Otelia Kraszewska (Gößweinstein) depicting Christ in a white robe as he turns to people of different ages. On the side altar is a painting by Anna Maria, Baroness of Oer (Gößweinstein) which shows the Madonna and Child. The ceiling murals, included one of the Lamb of God and the Four Evangelists. The statues in the gallery and the Stations of the Cross are sculpted by Giovanni Bruno (Gößweinstein).

On 1 January 1972, the municipality of Tüchersfeld was dissolved and its territory was incorporated into the boroughs of Pottenstein and Gößweinstein (the hamlets of Hühnerloh and Kohlenstein).

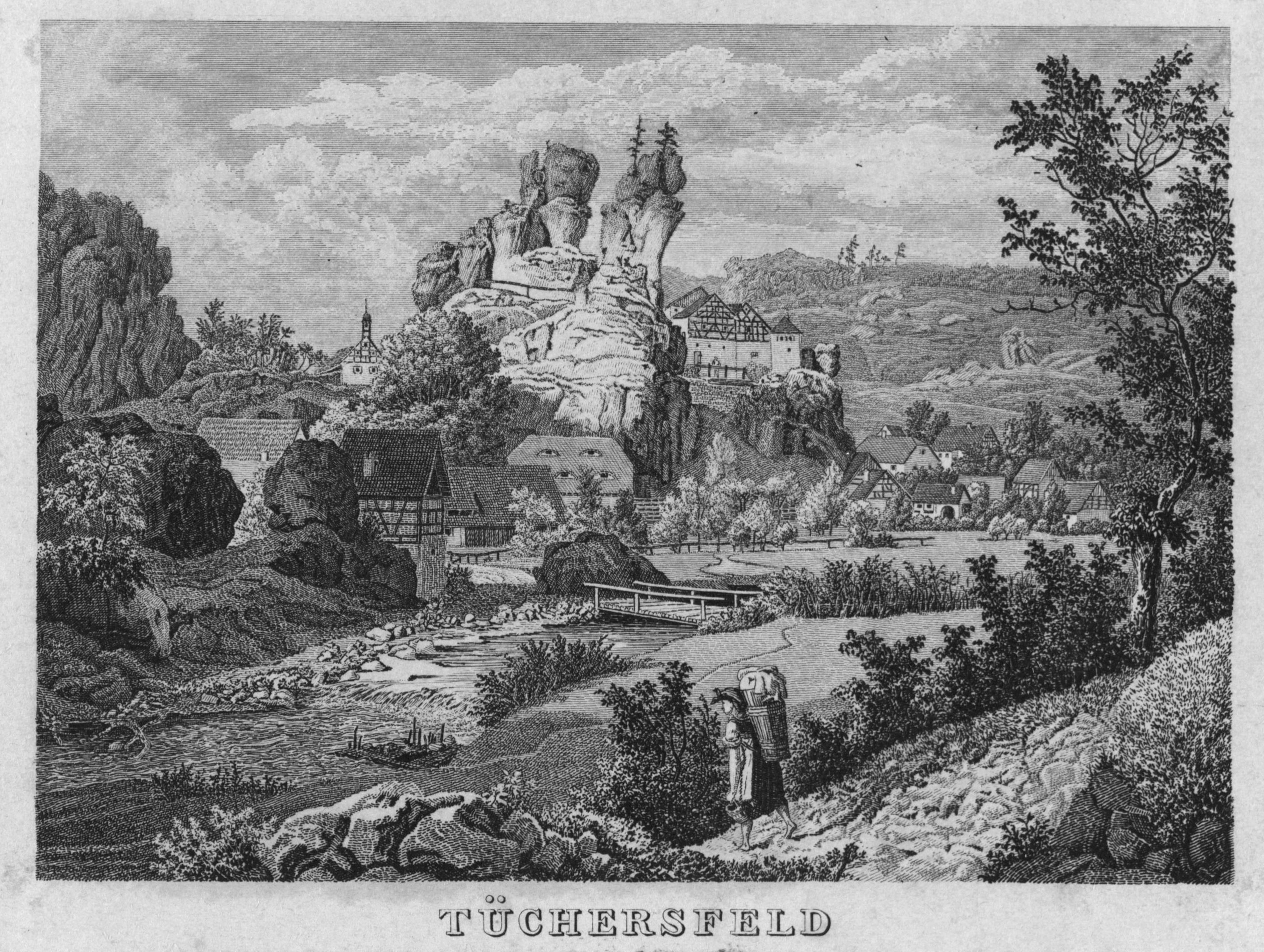
Tüchersfeld, 1834 steel engraving by Conrad Wießner

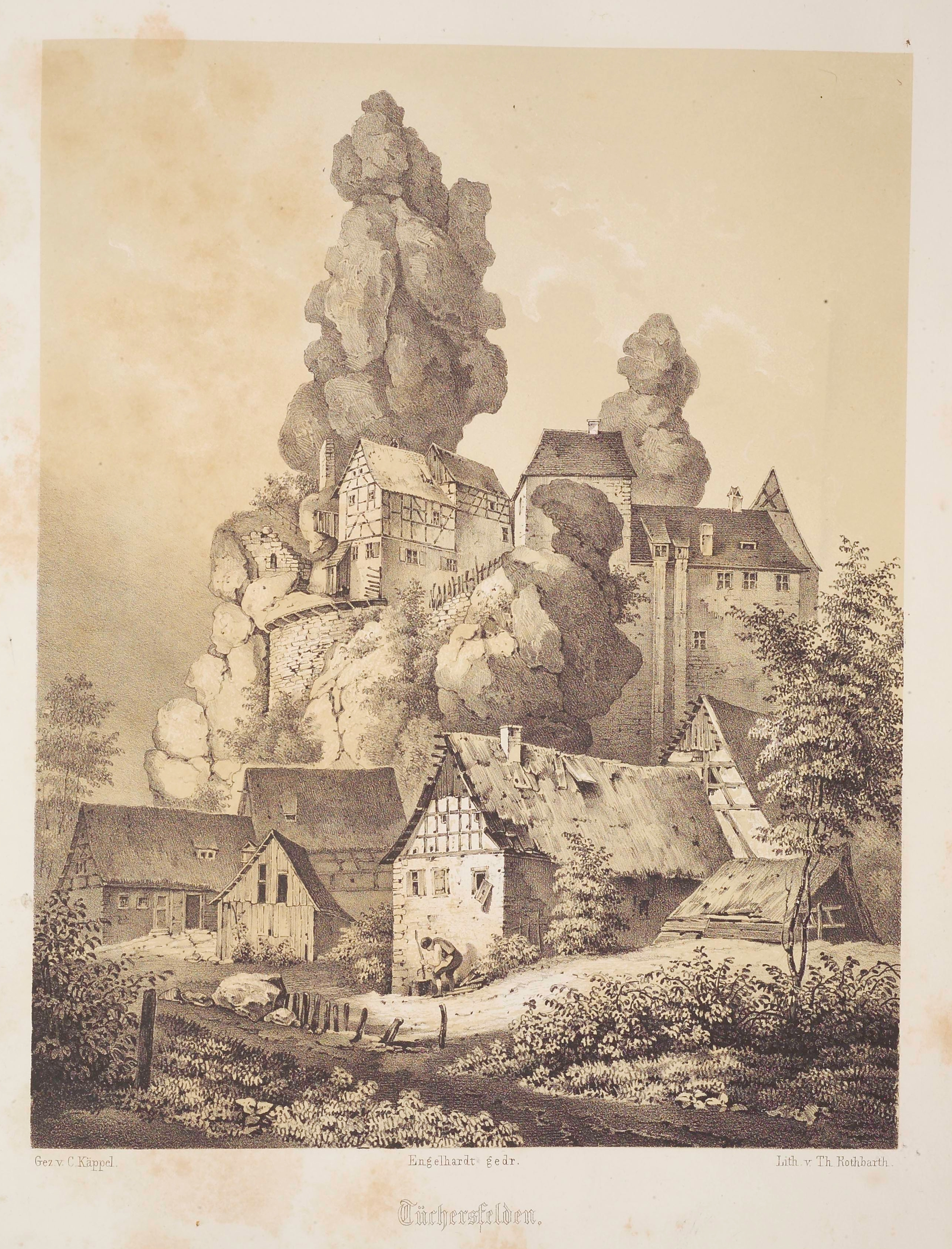
Tüchersfeld, lithography (c. 1840) by Theodor Rothbarth based on a drawing by Carl Käppel

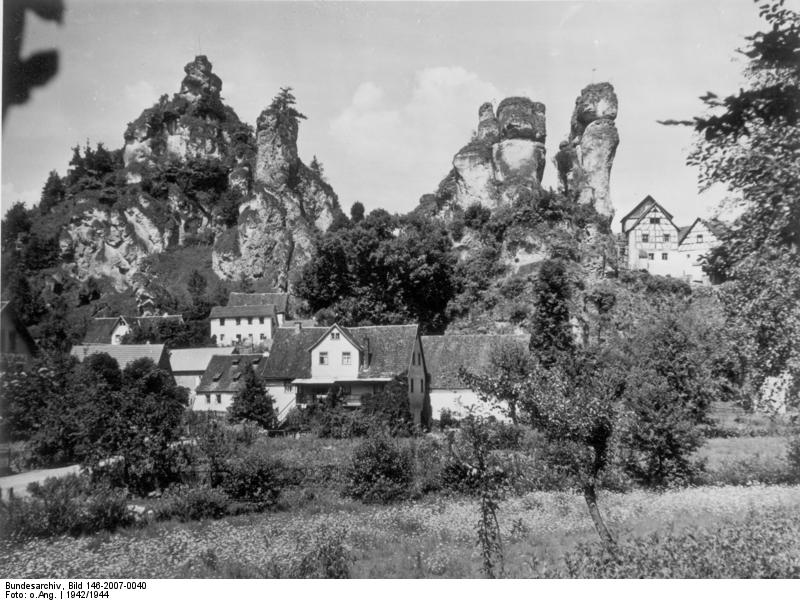
Tüchersfeld, 1942

== Literature ==
- Gerhard Philipp Wolff; Walter Tausendpfund (1997), "Tüchersfeld und der Judenhof", Jüdisches Leben in der Fränkischen Schweiz. Schriftenreihe des Fränkische Schweiz Vereins (in German), vol. Bd. 11, Erlangen/Jena, pp. 191–220
- Franz X. Bogner: Die Fränkische Schweiz. Ein Luftbildportrait. Ellwanger Verlag, Bayreuth, 2007, pp. 78–82, ISBN 978-3-925361-62-3.
