= Pottenstein, Bavaria =

Pottenstein
- Town
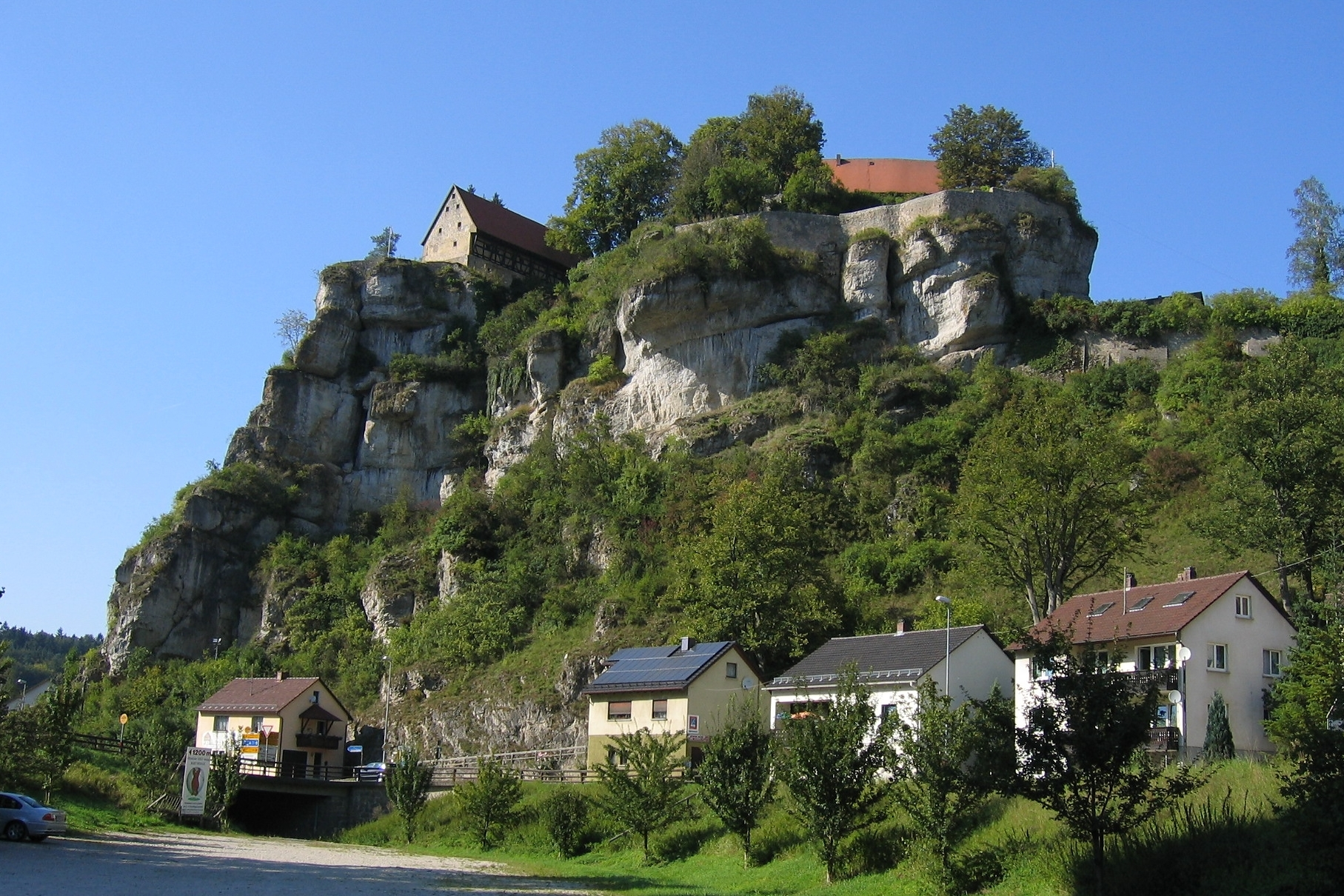
- Pottenstein Castle

- Coat of arms

- Location of Pottenstein within Bayreuth district
- Interactive map of Pottenstein
- Location within Germany Location within Bavaria
- Coordinates: 49°46′20″N 11°24′41″E
- Country: Germany
- State: Bavaria
- Admin. region: Oberfranken
- District: Bayreuth
- Subdivisions: 32 Ortsteile

Government
  - Mayor (2024–30): Christian Weber

Area
  - Total: 73.29 km^{2} (28.30 sq mi)
- Elevation: 368 m (1,207 ft)

Population (2025-12-31)
  - Total: 5,177
  - Density: 70.64/km^{2} (182.9/sq mi)
- Time zone: UTC+01:00 (CET)
  - Summer (DST): UTC+02:00 (CEST)
- Postal codes: 91278
- Dialling codes: 09243
- Vehicle registration: BT
- Website: www.pottenstein.de

Pottenstein (German pronunciation: [ˈpɔtn̩ˌʃtaɪn]) is a town in the district of Bayreuth, in Bavaria, Germany. It is situated 23 km southwest of Bayreuth, and 26 km east of Forchheim.

== History ==
During World War II, a subcamp of Flossenbürg concentration camp was located here.

== Geography ==
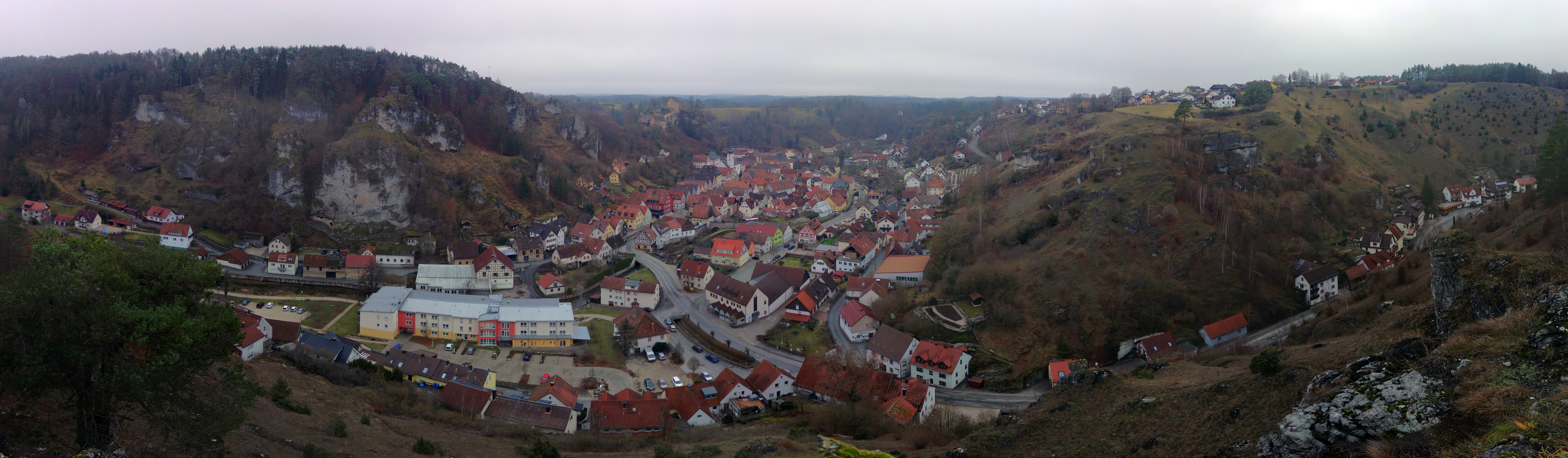
A panorama of Pottenstein from the east

The city of Pottenstein, altitude 350–614 m AMSL, with its nearly 1,500 inhabitants, is a health-resort in Franconian Switzerland. It nestles at the convergence of the Püttlach, Weihersbach and Haselbrunn valleys surrounded by high cliffs and at the foot of the 1000-year-old castle, which has played an important role throughout the city's history.

== Mayors ==
Since 2002 Stefan Frühbeißer (CWU-UWV) has been the mayor of Pottenstein. His predecessor was Dieter Bauernschmitt (CSU), who was in office for 12 years.

From 1935 to 1945 and again from 1953 to 1972 Hans Dippold was the mayor of Pottenstein. The farmer and restaurant keeper joined the Nazi Party in 1931.

== Tourist attractions ==
Saint Elisabeth, widow of Ludwig IV, Landgrave of Thuringia, was held hostage within its walls from 1228 to 1229. Many buildings bear her name today. According to legend, while she was being threatened, the eggs and lard in her basket were transformed into beautiful roses — a local adaptation of the famous Miracle of the Roses. Since 2004 there has been a marked walking route through the town, known as the "Elisabeth Route".

The market square, with its statue of Saint Elisabeth, the Catholic Church, shops, restaurants, and hotels form the central area of the city. Guest accommodations are mostly in the residential areas, in the valleys leading out of the centre of town, and in and above the cliffs overlooking the town. Easily reached from all the residential areas is the health centre with its massage department/medical swim therapy department, station for respiratory illnesses in Devil's Cave, the Kneipp facility, the tourist information centre, the park, putting green, tennis courts, Schöngrund Lake with its rowing boats and pedalos, the summer bobsleigh route, the "Felsenbad" (between the rocks), and golf course. There are 450 kilometres of marked paths for walking.

== Sons and daughters of the town ==
- Johann Baptist Reus (1868-1947), Jesuit and mystic

== Gallery ==
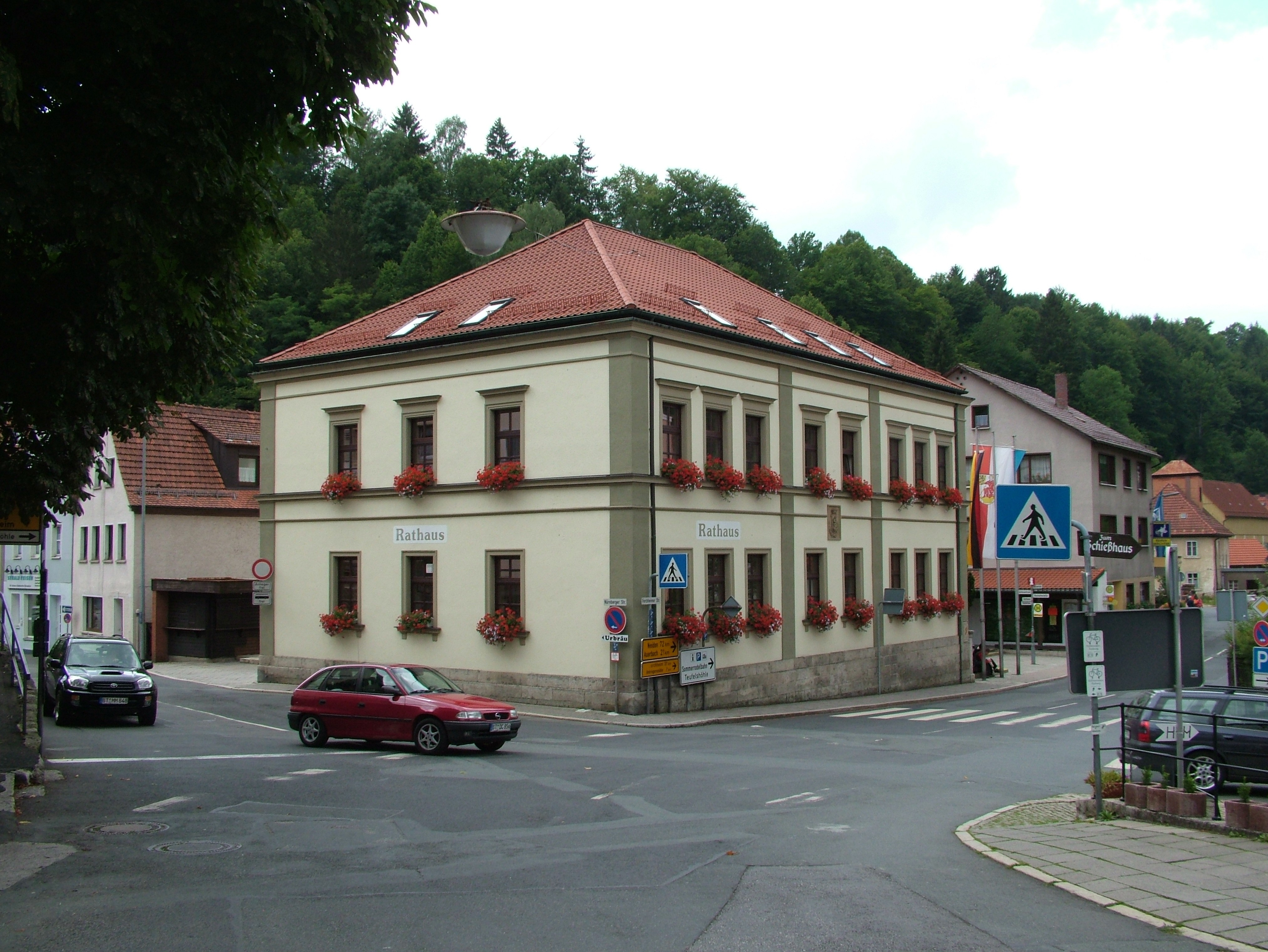
City Hall in Pottenstein

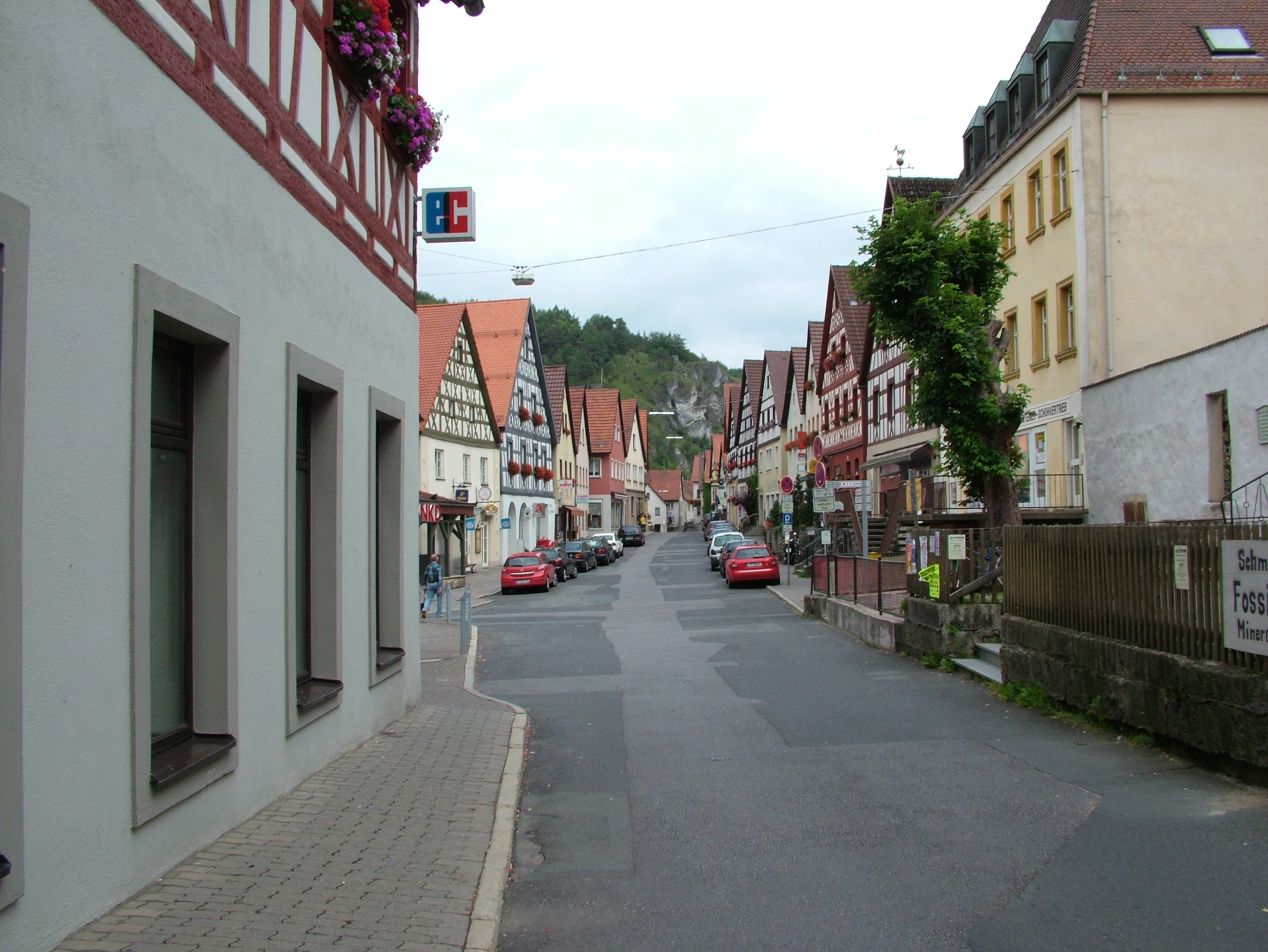
Main Street in Pottenstein

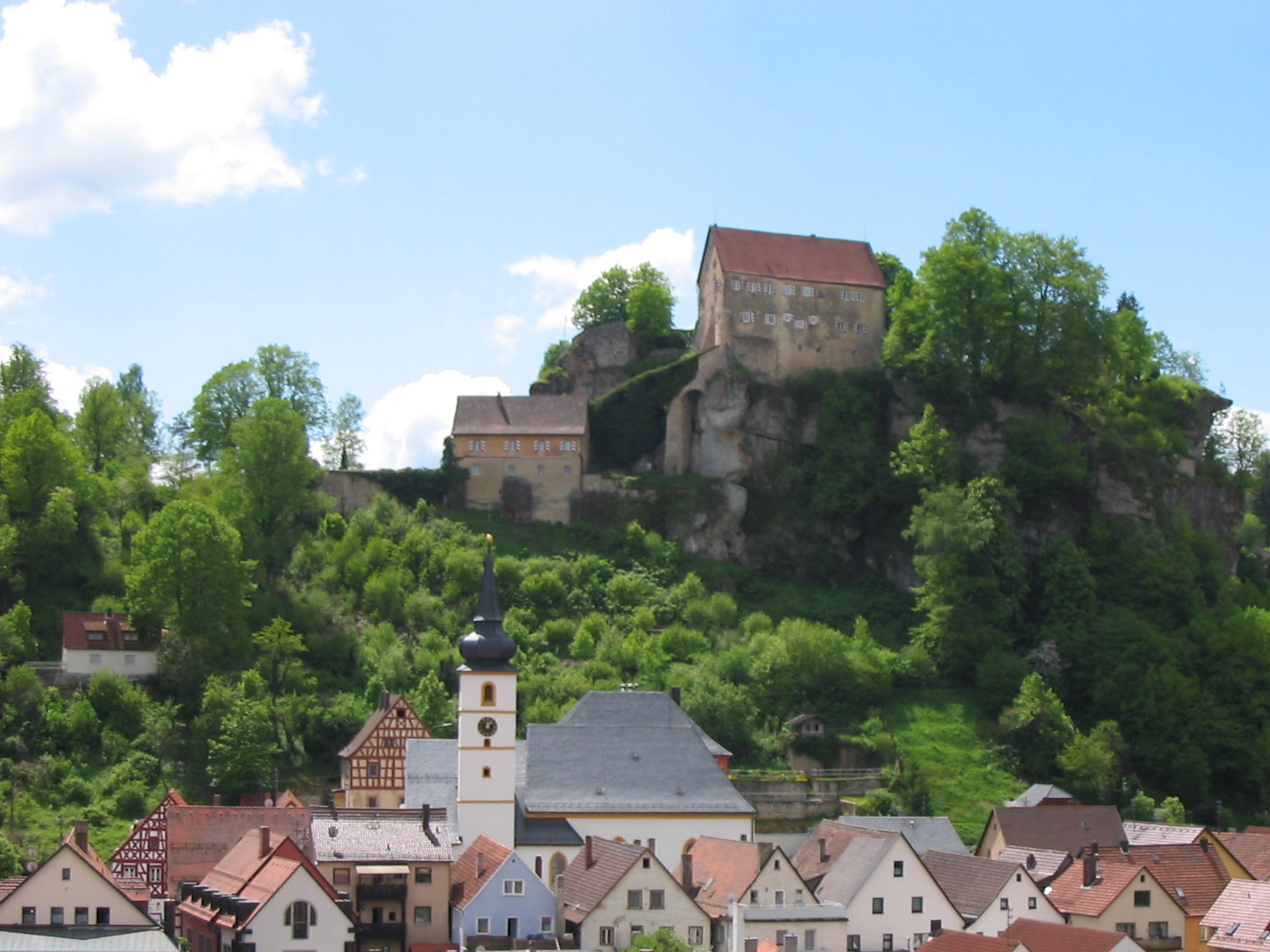
Pottenstein Castle

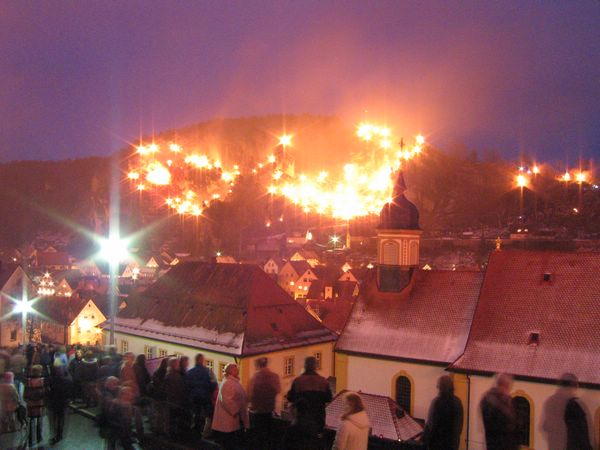
Yearly resolution of the Eternal Adoration (The Festival of Lights)
