= Rabeneck Castle =

- Waischenfeld-Rabeneck
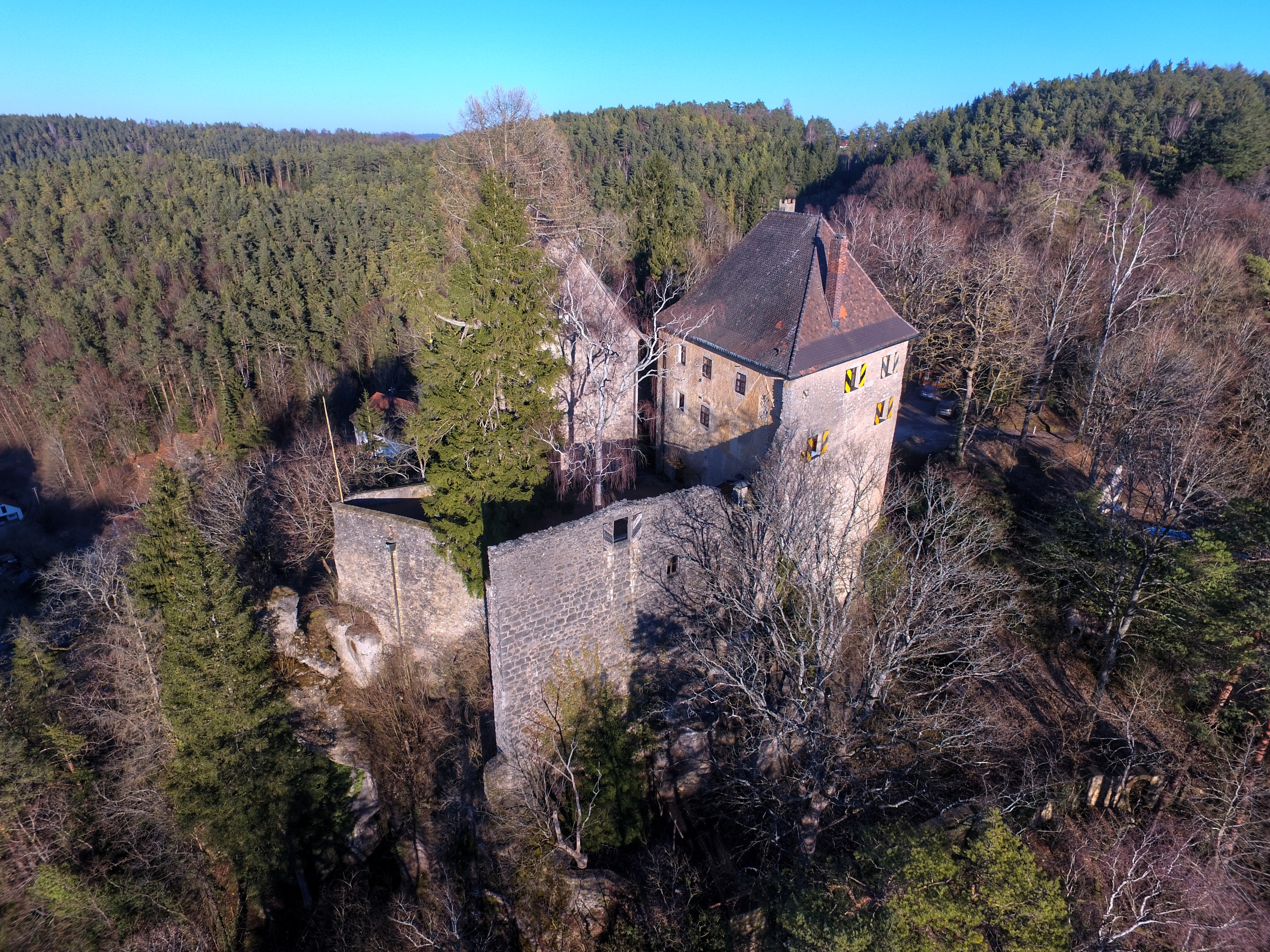
- Rabeneck Castle – view of the castle seen from the west

Site information
- Type: hill castle, spur castle
- Code: DE-BY
- Condition: preserved or largely preserved

Location
- Coordinates: 49°49′22″N 11°19′38″E
- Height: 415 m above sea level (NN)

Site history
- Built: c. 1250

Garrison information
- Occupants: ministeriales

Rabeneck Castle (German: Burg Rabeneck) is a former high mediaeval aristocratic castle which stands high above the valley of the Wiesent in the Upper Franconian district of Bayreuth in the German state of Bavaria.

The castle is open to the public; however, there is an entrance fee.

== Location ==
The hill castle is located within the Franconian Switzerland-Veldenstein Forest Nature Park on a rocky hill spur at a height of about 415 metres above the valley of the River Wiesent in the region of Franconian Switzerland, about three kilometres south-southwest of Waischenfeld.

Nearby are the ruins of Waischenfeld Castle and, to the east, Rabenstein Castle, which was probably the family seat of the Rabenecks, who belonged to the family of ministeriales the House of Rabenstein.

Further up the Wiesent valley on the gallows hill (Galgenberg) above the powder mill stood Schlüsselberg Castle, the ancestral castle of the lords of Schlüsselberg.

== History ==
=== Foundation ===
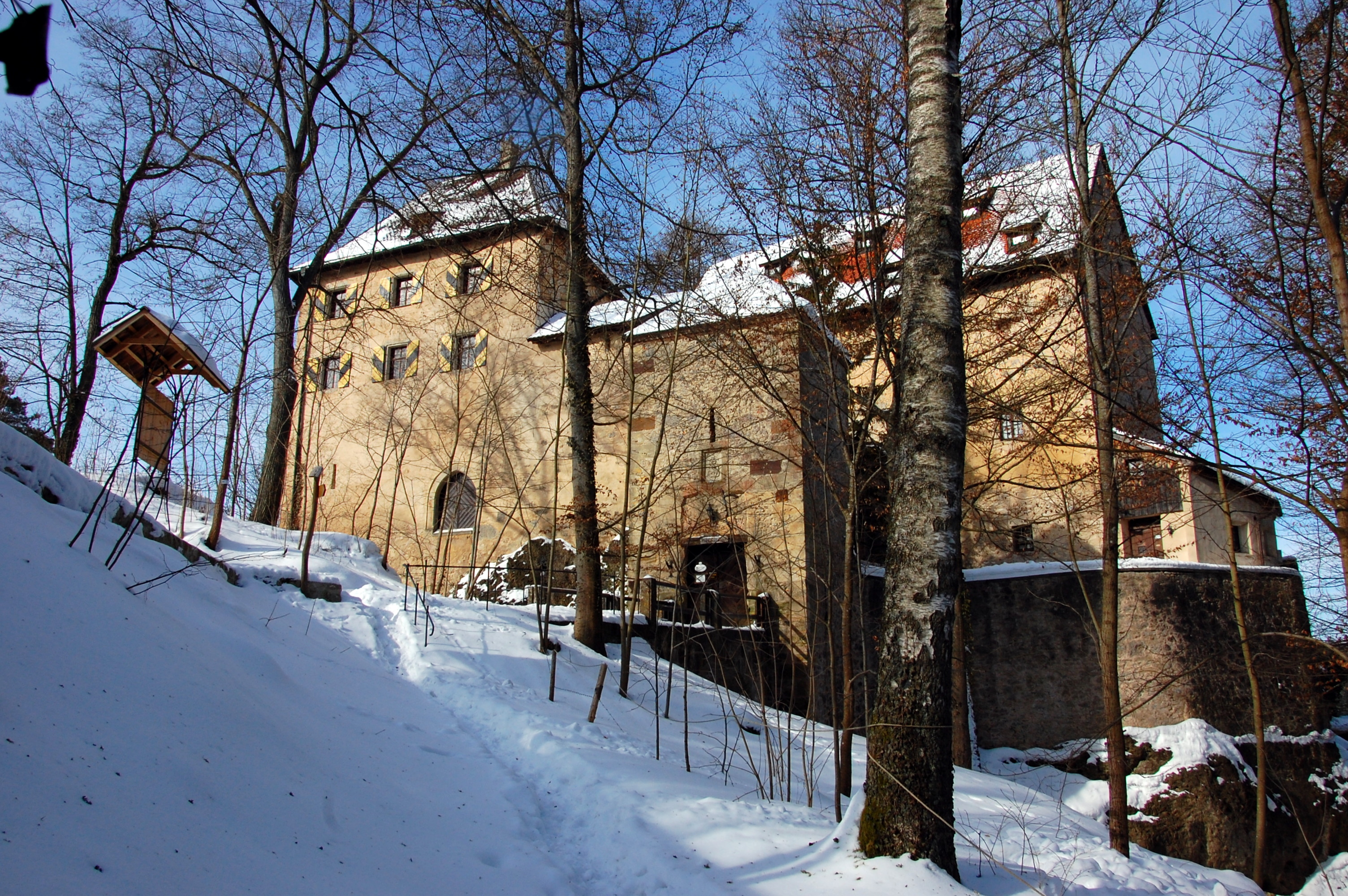
View of Rabeneck Castle from the circular walk

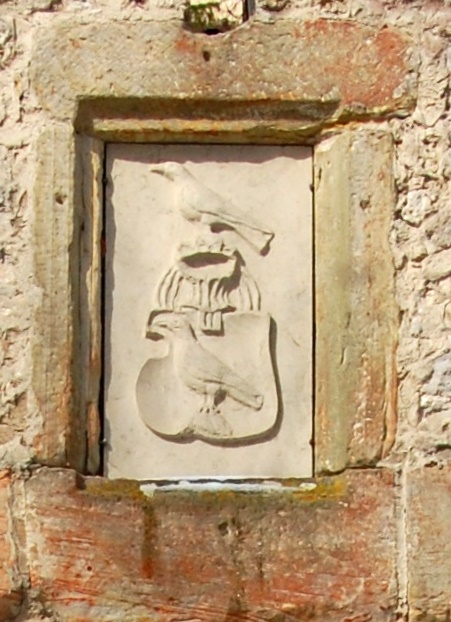
Coat of arms of the Rabensteins above the castle gate

The family name, Rabeneck, first surfaces in 1217 in a list of fiefs of Tegernsee Abbey in conjunction with Ebertshausen Castle; then, in 1242, with Ulrich, a citizen of Munich; and subsequently in a 1257 document which mentioned the witnesses Siboto de Rabeneck and Chunrad de Rabenekke. A Nentwich of Rabenekke, presumably clergy, appeared in 1261 and 1296 in a document; and a Henry of Rabeneck (Heinrich von Rabenec) in 1276.

The Ravenecks of Babenberg probably come from the family of the lords of Rabenstein, as the word Raben ("raven") in both Rabenstein and Rabeneck and the close proximity of the two castles suggests. The suffix Eck ("corner") also indicates that the castle may have been built later that those whose names end in Stein ("stone"). In addition, both names suggest a connection with capital punishment. The Rabenstein with a site of a gallows, and Rabeneck with an executioner's sword.

A branch of the Rabensteins built Rabeneck before 1200 as an allodial castle, and named a cadet line of the family after it. Unlike Rabenstein, Rabeneck Castle was did not belong to the Barony of Waischenfeld, which the barons of Schlüsselberg occupied at that time, nevertheless they still had stakes in the castle. How they came to own these shares is not known.

After Conrad of Schlüsselberg had been killed defending Neideck Castle in 1347, his brother-in-law, Count Günter of Schwarzburg, his wife, Reichza, and her sister, Agnes, the wife of Henry of Plauen, sold the portion in 1348 "to which he had rights in the castle at Rebeneck" to the Bishopric of Bamberg. This agreement was confirmed in 1376 once more by Count John of Schwarzburg and his son, Günther. In 1360 Countess Sophia of Zollern, née von Schlüsselberg, petitioned in vain for the return of the family's part of the castle

=== Different owners ===
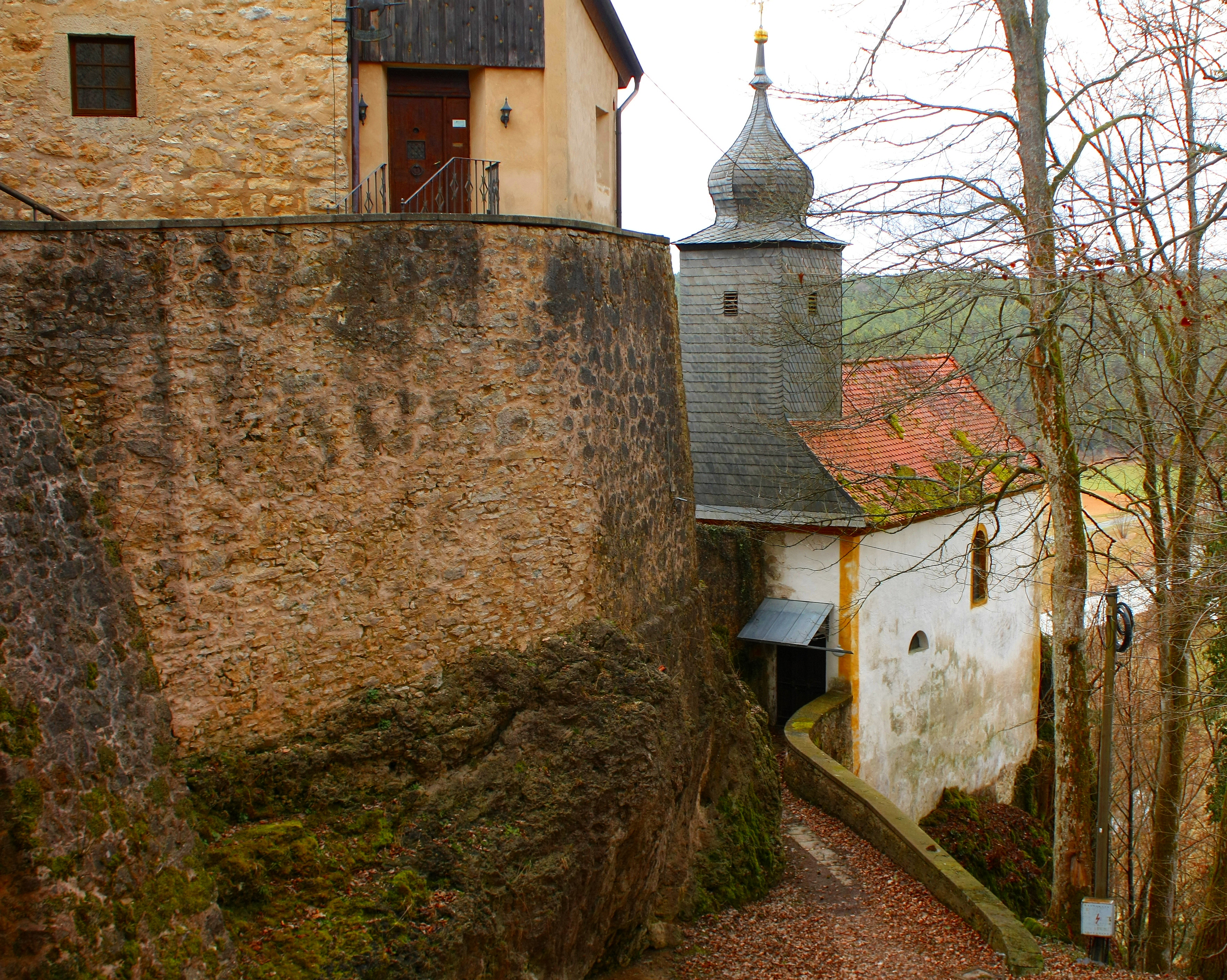
The 1412 castle chapel of St. Bartholomew on the rock spur

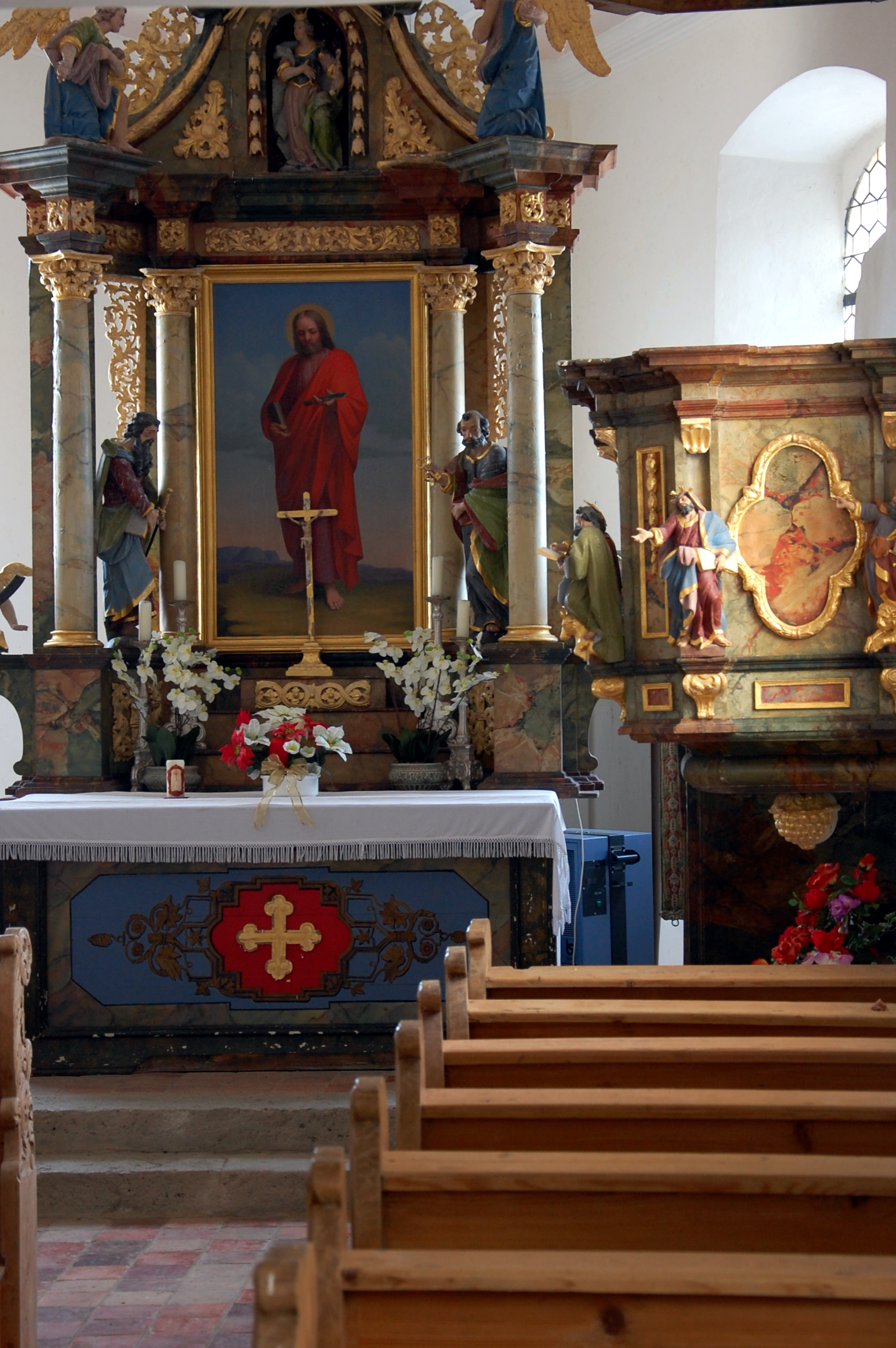
Interior of the castle chapel of St. Bartholomew

In 1353 the castle was wholly owned by the Rabensteins, so they had probably snapped up the part of the castle belonging to the Bishopric of Bamberg that was presumably in financial difficulties as a result of the purchase of the remaining Schlüsselberg estates. From 1360 Rabeneck was no longer mentioned as part of the Bamberg estate. In 1353, the Rabensteins granted access rights (Öffnungsrecht) to their allodial castle to the Burgraviate of Nuremberg for 12 years.

In 1388 Rabeneck Castle was an allodial possession of the lords of Stiebar, after Conrad Stiebar, Hofmeister of the Bishop of Bamberg, had presumably purchased it. They, too, granted the burgraves access rights for 700 guilders. In the same year Rabeneck was captured by the Bamberg knight, Ulrich of Aufseß and Hans Stiebar in the war of the cities, the reason was probably the access rights for the city of Nuremberg.

Cathedral dean, Friedrich Stiebar, instituted the castle chaplaincy in 1415, confirmed by Bishop Albert.

In the Peasants' War the castle fell victim in 1525 to rebellious peasants, who captured it and burned it out. Alexander Stiebar zu Rabeneck was given 485 guilders and Christoph Stiebar, who owned the other half of the castle, 554 guilders as recompense. Its rebuilding lasted until 1535.

Until 1530 Rabeneck remained in the hands of the Stiebars. On 28 January 1530 Alexander Stiebar turned his half of the castle into a fief of the Bishopric of Bamberg. 29 years later, Christoph Stiebar's share of the castle had also become a Bamberg fief, the bishopric now owning the whole castle. After the death of Christoph, who was in serious debt, his share went to his son, Endres, a Pfleger at Pottenstein, who died in 1572, and via William of Künsberg, who called himself Rabeneck in 1570, to Daniel Rabenstein. The latter was enfeoffed in 1577 with the purchased half. The second half of Rabeneck remained for longer in the possession of the Stiebars. After Daniel Stiebar, the last member of the zu Rabeneck line, had meanwhile become a cleric, his half went to the Stiebar line of Buttenheim and Ermreuth. In 1603 the Stiebars sold their half to their brother-in-law, George Werner of Rabenstein. At that tie Rabenstein Castle was already being described as dilapidated. The Rabensteins sold the castle in 1620 after the death of George for 36,000 guilders to the Bishopric of Bamberg. As a result of renewed financial difficulties in the bishopric, Bishop John Godfrey of Aschhausen had to advance the money on loan, the castle remained an inheritable possession until the bishopric could pay back the money. Rabeneck was still in the possession of the Aschhausens until 1682.

The guilders that the Rabensteins were paid, were of low value, so that Hans Dietrich and Hans Christoph of Rabenstein began a lawsuit against the bishopric in the second quarter of the 17th century, because they complained they had been paid worthless money. Not until 2 March 1716 was there an agreement between Bishop Lothair Francis of Schönborn and the Rabensteiners, with which the Rabensteins retrospectively became owners of the castle on 22 February. From Bishop Lothar they also received in 1717 a credit of 12,000 Reichstalers, which was raised in 1719 to 20,000 guilders, in order to repair the ruined castle. They certainly renewed the inner bailey; the outer bailey remained abandoned.

=== Rabeneck under the lords of Schönborn ===
With the death of Peter John Albert of Rabenstein on 19 May 1742 the last Rabenstein at Rabeneck, the family died out and the Barony of Rabeneck reverted to the Bishopric of Bamberg. On 10 December 1742 Count Francis Rudolph Erwein of Schönborn, the brother of Bishop Frederick Charles of Schönborn was enfeoffed with Rabeneck Castle. However, after the death of Bishop Frederick on 26 July 1746 the cathedral chapter refused to recognise the enfeoffment to the Schönborns, and so a lengthy and costly court case was brought before the Reichshofrat. The Reichshofrat decided in favour of the Count of Schönborn, and on 1 October 1778 Bishop Adam Frederick of Seinsheim had to allow the counts to have possession again.

=== Today ===
In 1975 the castle was sold to its present occupant, Norman Schiller. The castle may currently be visited and overnight stays are possible. Festivals may also be organised by prior arrangement.

== Historical images ==
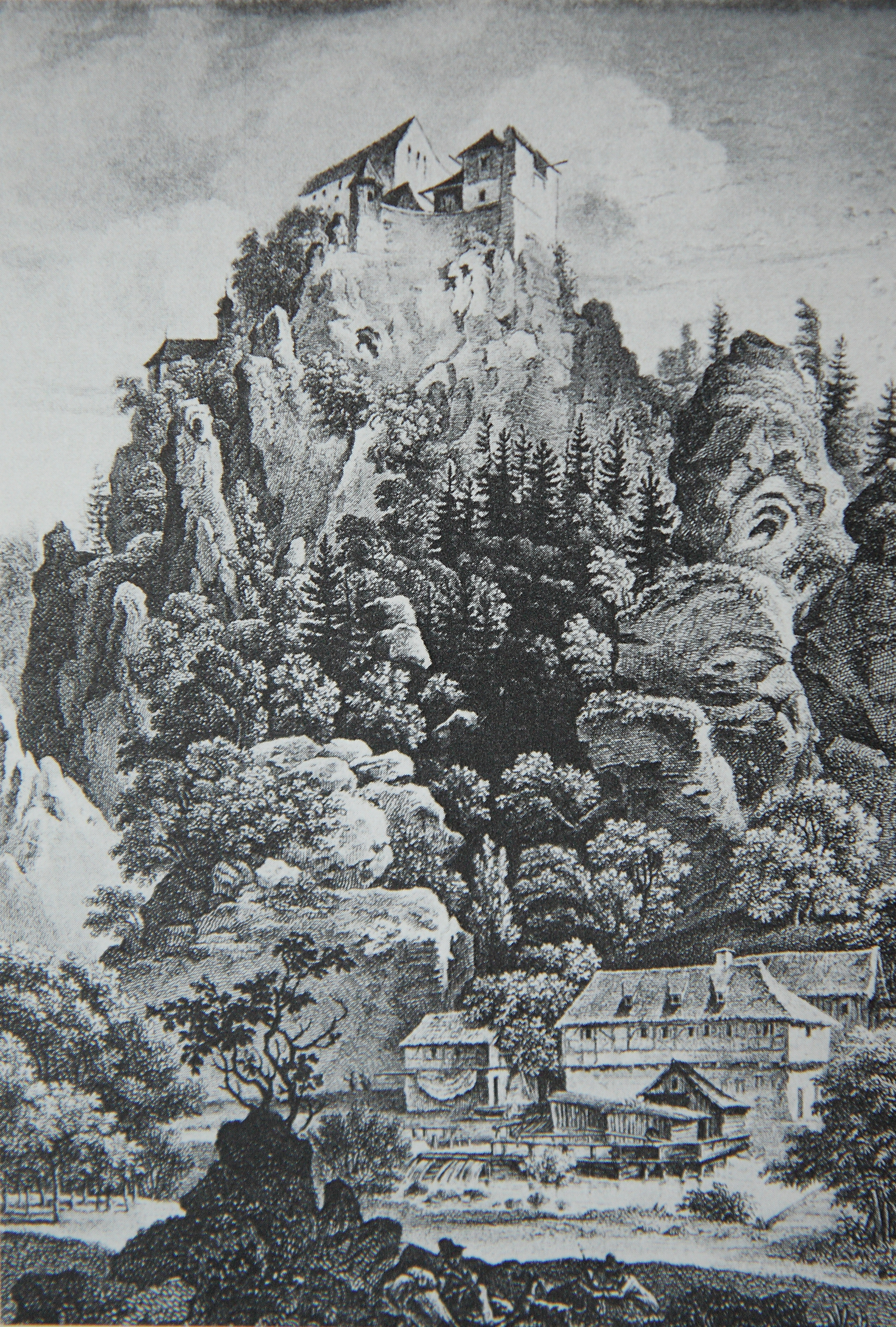
View from the west, 1827 steel engraving by Friedrich Geissler

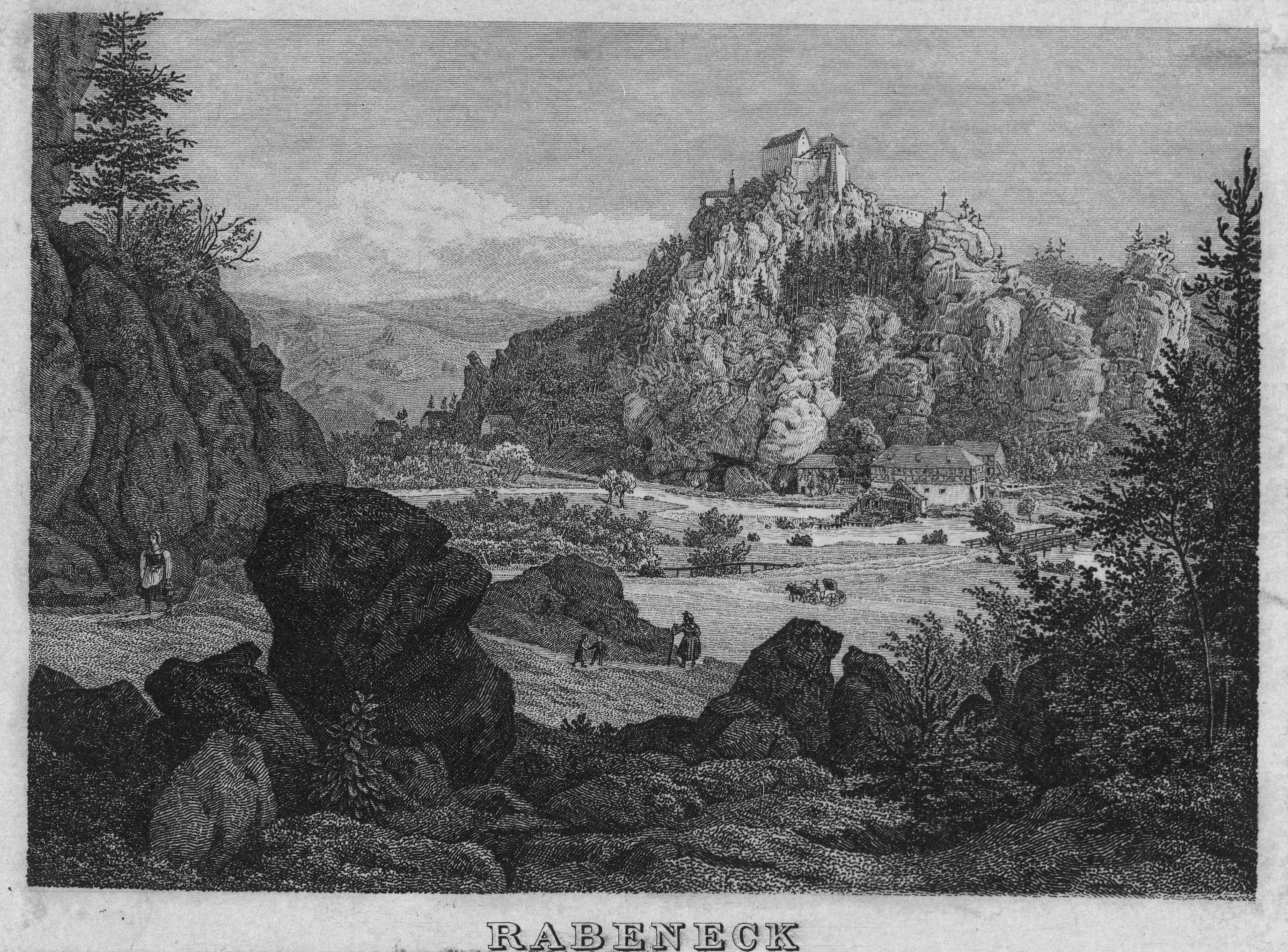
View from the west, 1834 steel engraving by Conrad Wießner

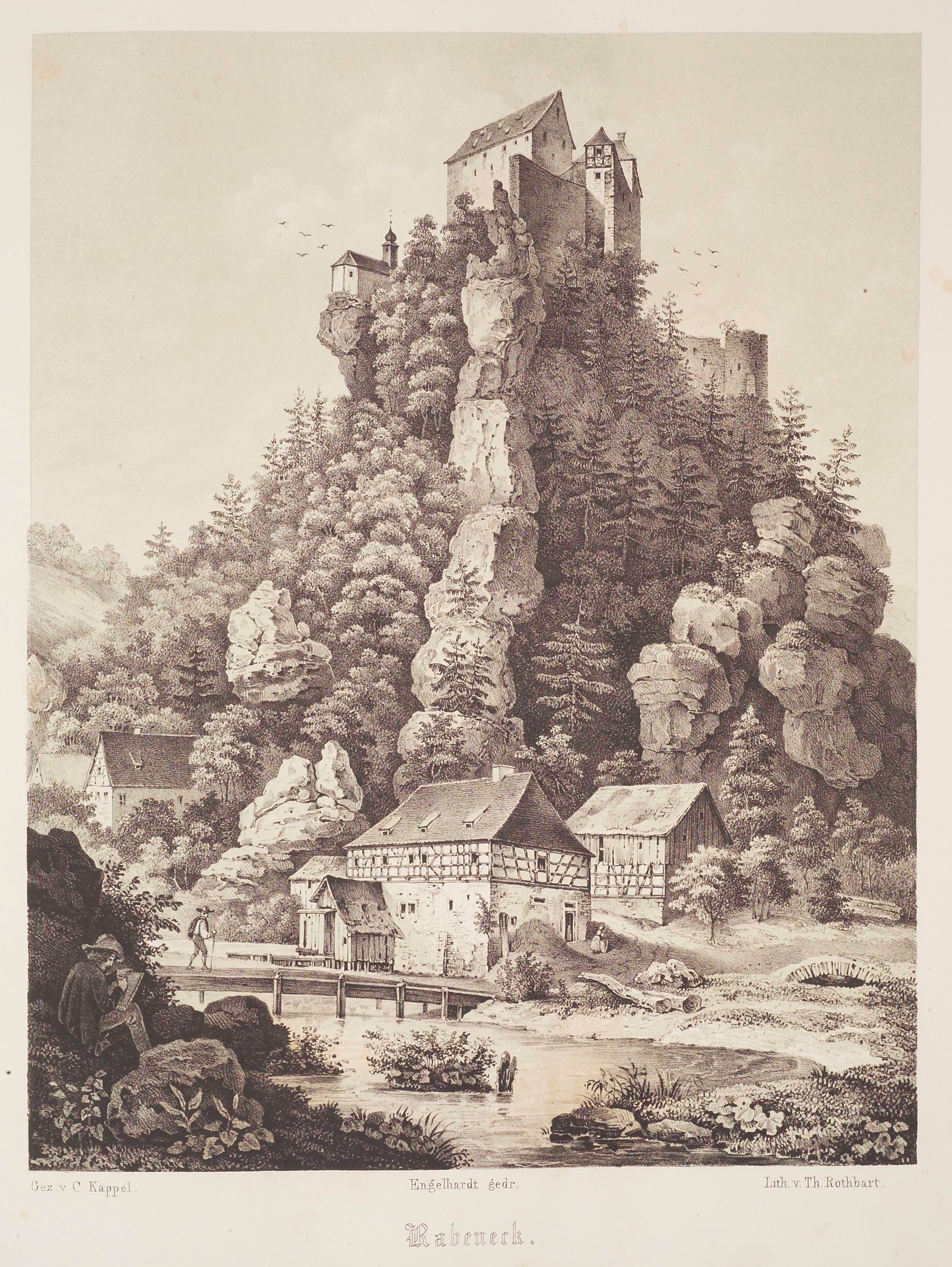
View from the west, lithograph c. 1840 by Theodor Rothbarth from a drawing by Carl Käppel

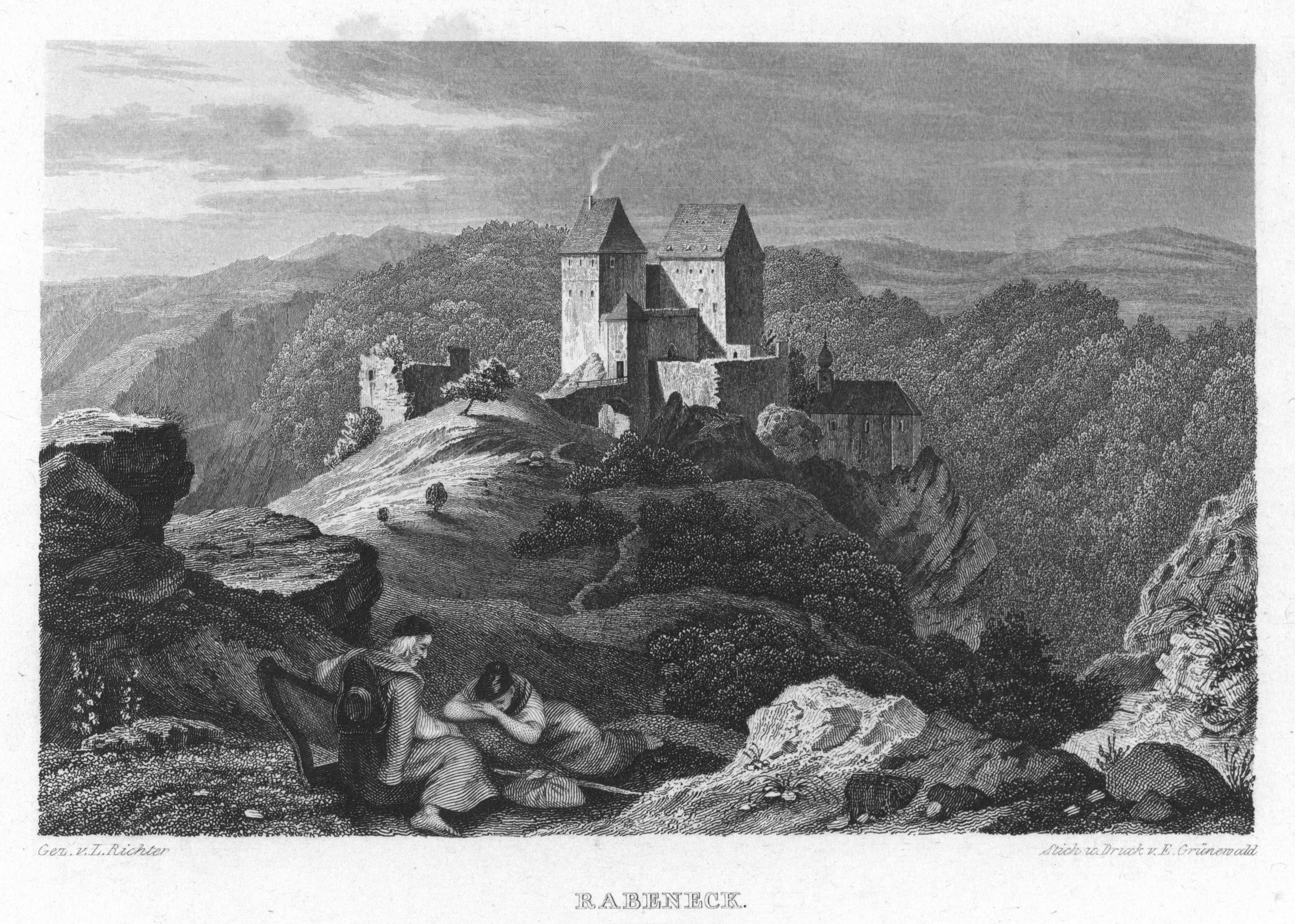
View from the southeast, 1840 steel engraving by E. Grünewald from a drawing by Ludwig Richter

== Literature ==
- Hellmut Kunstmann: Die Burgen der östlichen Fränkischen Schweiz. Kommissionsverlag Ferdinand Schöningh, Würzburg, 1965, pp. 63–83.
- Björn-Uwe Abels, Joachim Zeune et al.: Führer zu archäologischen Denkmälern in Deutschland, Band 20: Fränkische Schweiz. Konrad Theiss Verlag GmbH und Co., Stuttgart, 1990, ISBN 3-8062-0586-8, pp. 233–235.
- Gustav Voit, Walter Rüfer: Eine Burgenreise durch die Fränkische Schweiz, Palm und Enke Verlag, Erlangen, 1984, ISBN 3-7896-0064-4, pp. 149–154.
- Toni Eckert, Susanne Fischer, Renate Freitag, Rainer Hofmann, Walter Tausendpfund: Die Burgen der Fränkischen Schweiz: Ein Kulturführer. Gürtler Druck, Forchheim o.J., ISBN 3-9803276-5-5, pp. 125–129.
- Ursula Pfistermeister: Wehrhaftes Franken – Band 3: Burgen, Kirchenburgen, Stadtmauern um Bamberg, Bayreuth und Coburg, Fachverlag Hans Carl GmbH, Nuremberg, 2002, ISBN 3-418-00387-7, pp. 102–104.
- Rüdiger Bauriedel, Ruprecht Konrad-Röder: Mittelalterliche Befestigungen und niederadelige Ansitze im Landkreis Bayreuth. Ellwanger Druck und Verlag, Bayreuth, 2007, ISBN 978-3-925361-63-0, p. 152.
