= Access rights =

Access rights may refer to:

- Access rights (medieval law), the right of a liege lord to use a vassal's castle, fortified house or fortified town in time of conflict
- Freedom to roam, the right to access public land
- Access to Information Act, a Canadian act that allows public access to government information
- Disability rights movement, disabled access to public and private locations is a key issue
- Access control, the ability to permit or deny the use of something by someone
- File system permissions, security control over file access in computer operating systems
- Harvey v. Horan, a U.S. Federal Court case which decided right of access to DNA testing
- Right of public access to the wilderness

== See also ==
- Access (disambiguation)
- Accessibility
- Entitlement (disambiguation)
- Limited-access road
- Open access (disambiguation)
- Public access (disambiguation)
