= Rabenstein Castle (Upper Franconia) =

Castle in Germany

- Ahorntal
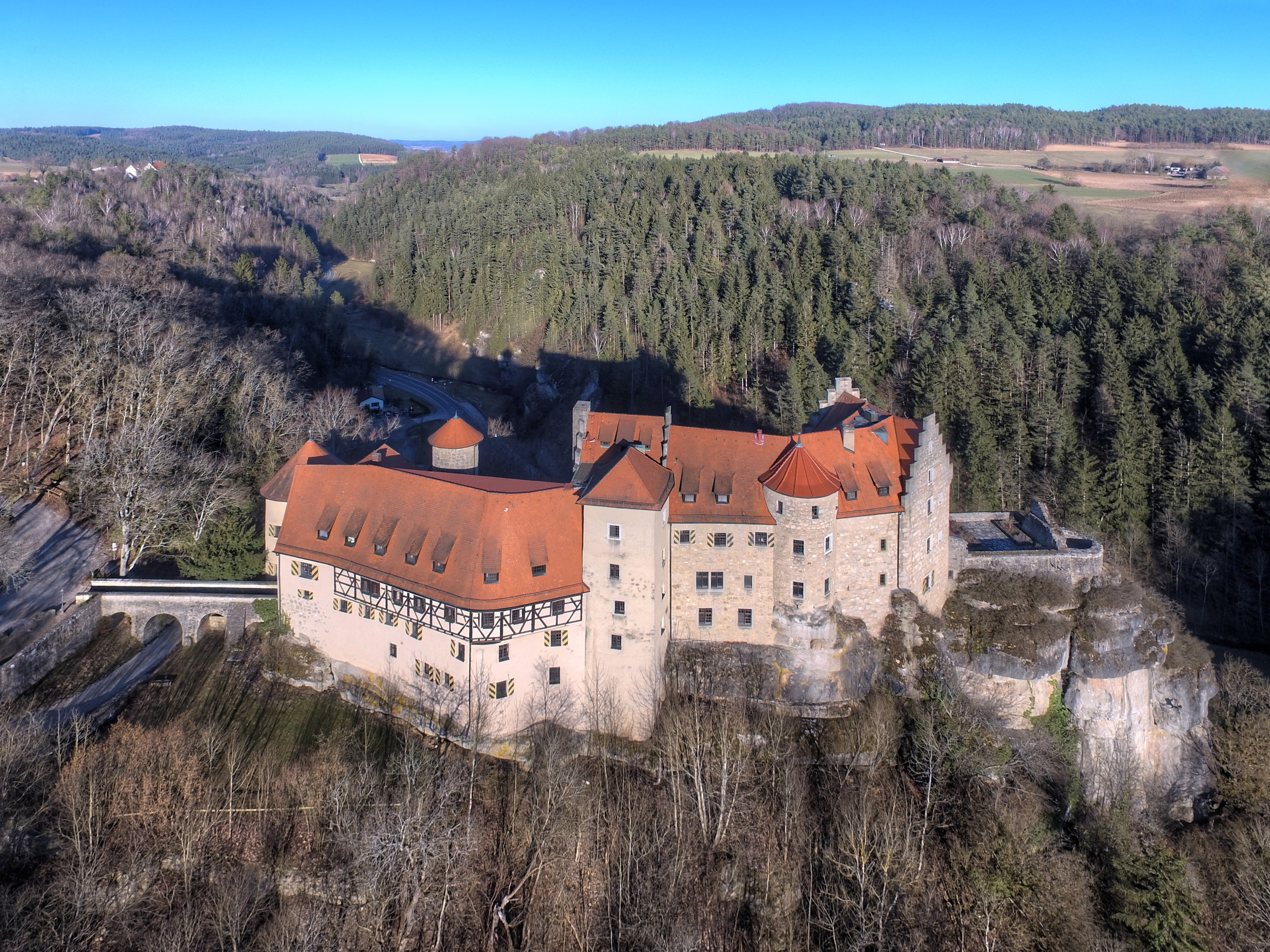
- Rabenstein Castle, west side (February 2021)

Site information
- Type: hill castle, spur castle
- Code: DE-BY
- Condition: preserved or largely preserved

Location
- Coordinates: 49°49′20″N 11°22′15″E
- Height: 420 m above sea level (NN)

Site history
- Built: c. 1175 to 1200

Garrison information
- Occupants: ministeriales

Rabenstein Castle (German: Burg Rabenstein) is a former high medieval aristocratic castle in the municipality of Ahorntal in the Upper Franconian county of Bayreuth in the German state of Bavaria.

The spur castle may be visited for an entrance fee.

== Location ==
The hill castle is located within the Franconian Switzerland-Veldenstein Forest Nature Park on a rocky hill spur at a height of about 420 metres over the valley of the Ailsbach in Franconian Switzerland, 6.5 kilometres northwest of Pottenstein. Within walking distance of the castle is Sophie's Cave, a dripstone cave that is popular with tourists.

In the vicinity of Rabenstein Castle, there used to be several other castles: on the opposite side of the valley is the suspected site or burgstall of Brunnloch or Rabenloch, a little further up the Ailsbach valley once stood the castle of Ahorn, the present day hamlet of Klausstein, opposite it is probably the site of Hohenloch Castle above Ludwig's Cave, down the valley lies the Alte Veste and in the village of Oberailsfeld there was once another small fortification, Ailsfeld Castle on a rock in the valley. Towards the west, above the valley of the Wiesent, stands Rabeneck Castle, a fortification probably founded by the Rabensteins.

== History of the castle ==
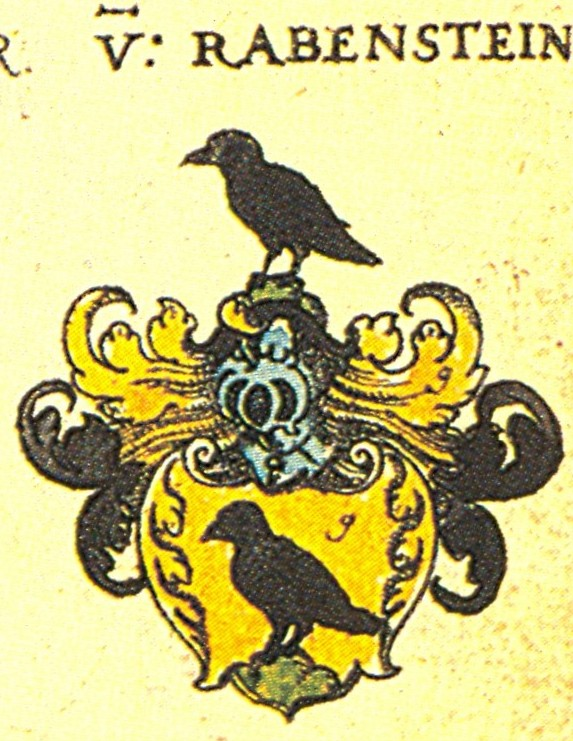
Rabenstein coat of arms from Siebmacher's armorial

The oldest parts of the castle were built in the first quarter of the 12th century as a residence in the Barony of Waischenfeld. At the same time, the ministerialis family of Rabenstein, who were the builders of the castle and bore the raven on their coat of arms, were recorded as being in the service of the barons of Waischenfeld. In the early 13th century, the outer ward was expanded. During the following centuries, ownership and occupancy of the castle changed hands several times. Its occupants included the House of Schlüsselberg and its lords, the burgraves of Nuremberg. In 1450, the castle was destroyed in the First Margrave War. However, it was rebuilt by Conz of Wirsberg in 1489.

In 1557, the castle went to the von Rabensteins, who had ambitions for the nobility and bought back their family seat. Daniel of Rabenstein remodelled the castle in 1570, the old outer ward being merged with the inner ward.

During the Thirty Years' War, the castle was again completely destroyed by imperial troops, because its lord, Hans Christoph of Rabenstein, aligned himself with the Swedes. After the war between 1648 and 1728, a few small buildings and a farm were re-established.

In 1742, the von Rabensteins died out and the castle went to the counts of Schönborn-Wiesentheid, who revamped the ruins in 1829/30 for a royal visit by Ludwig I.

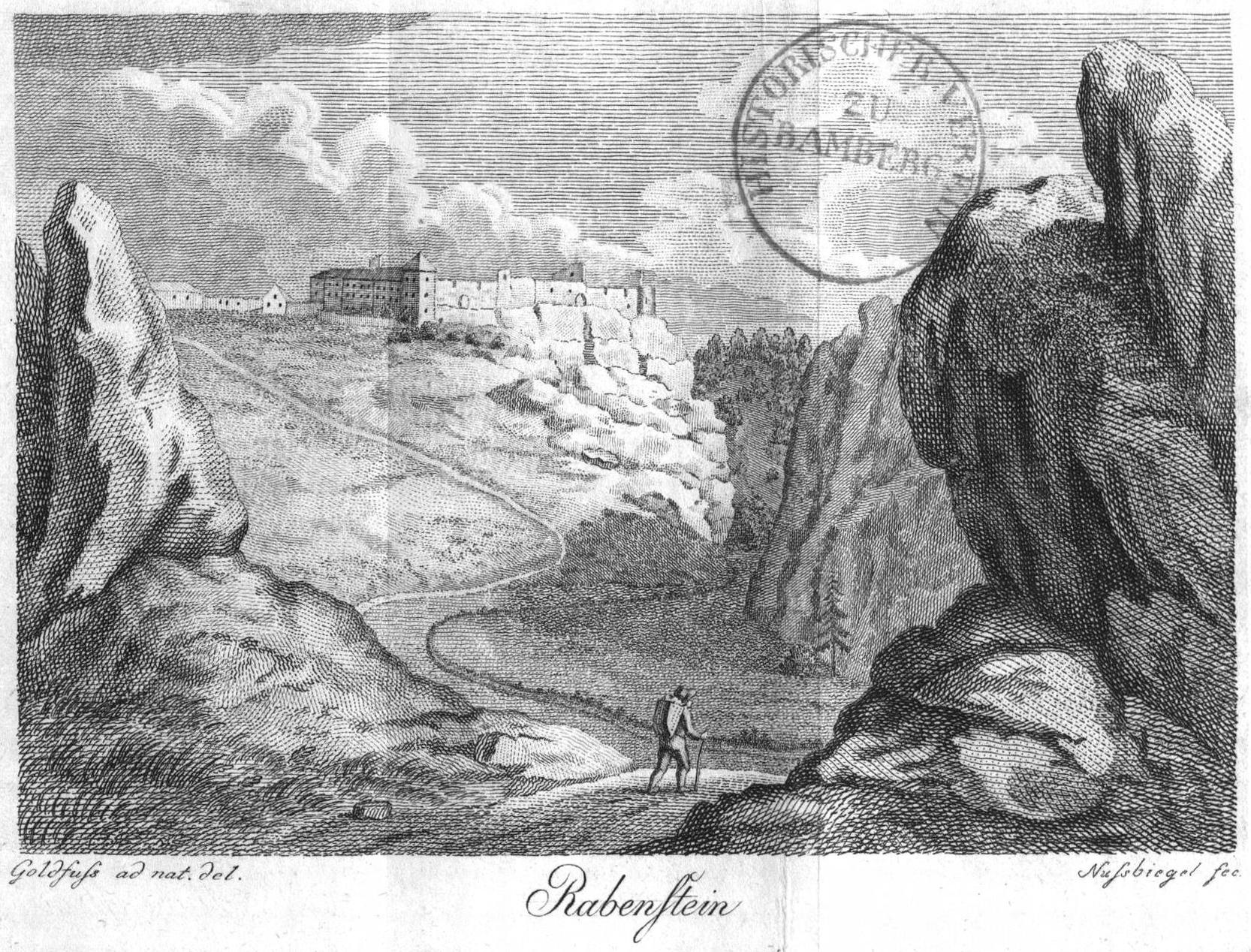
Rabenstein Castle, 1810 steel engraving by Johann Nussbiegel

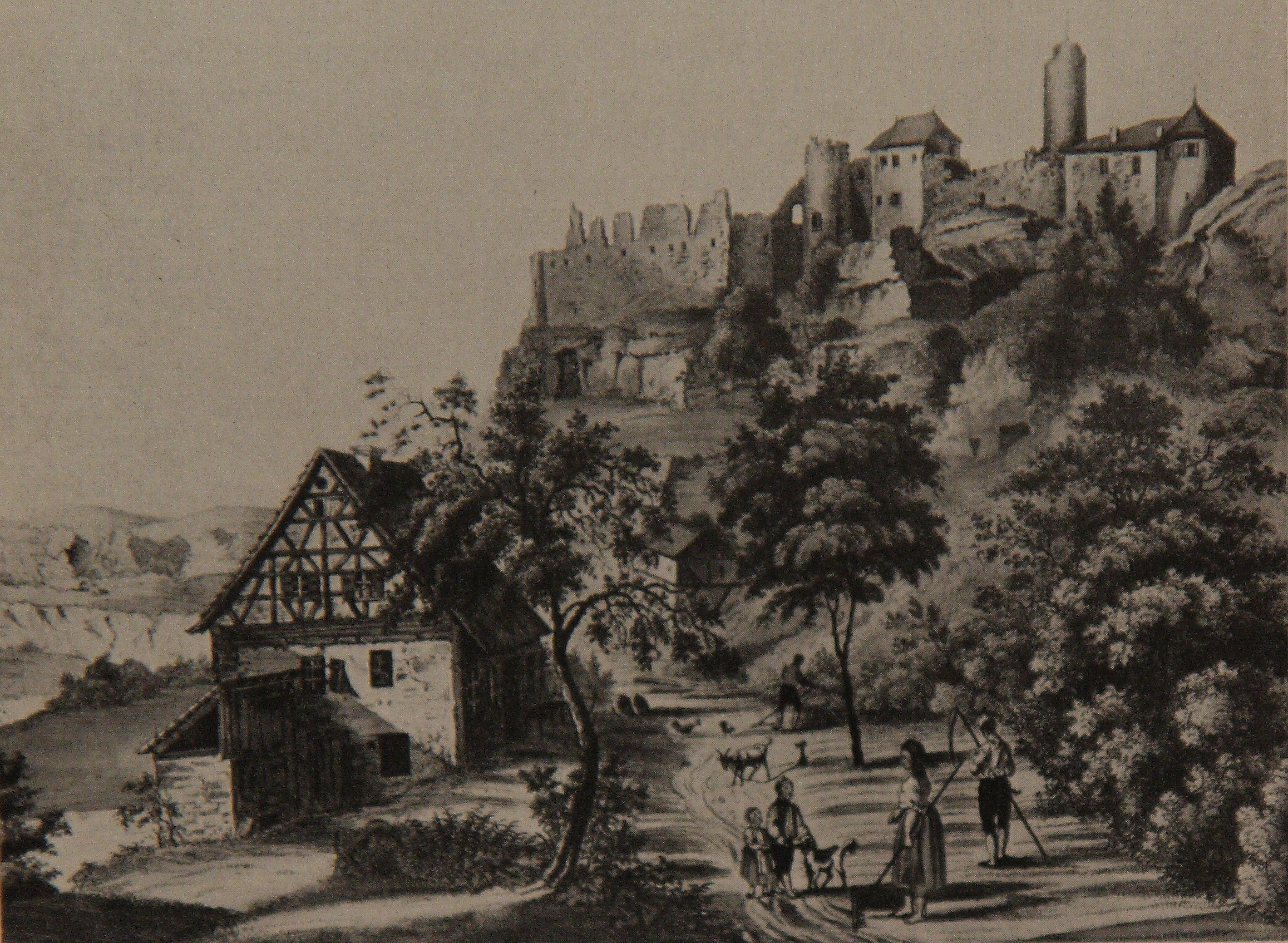
Rabenstein Castle, 1829 etching by Felix Grünewald

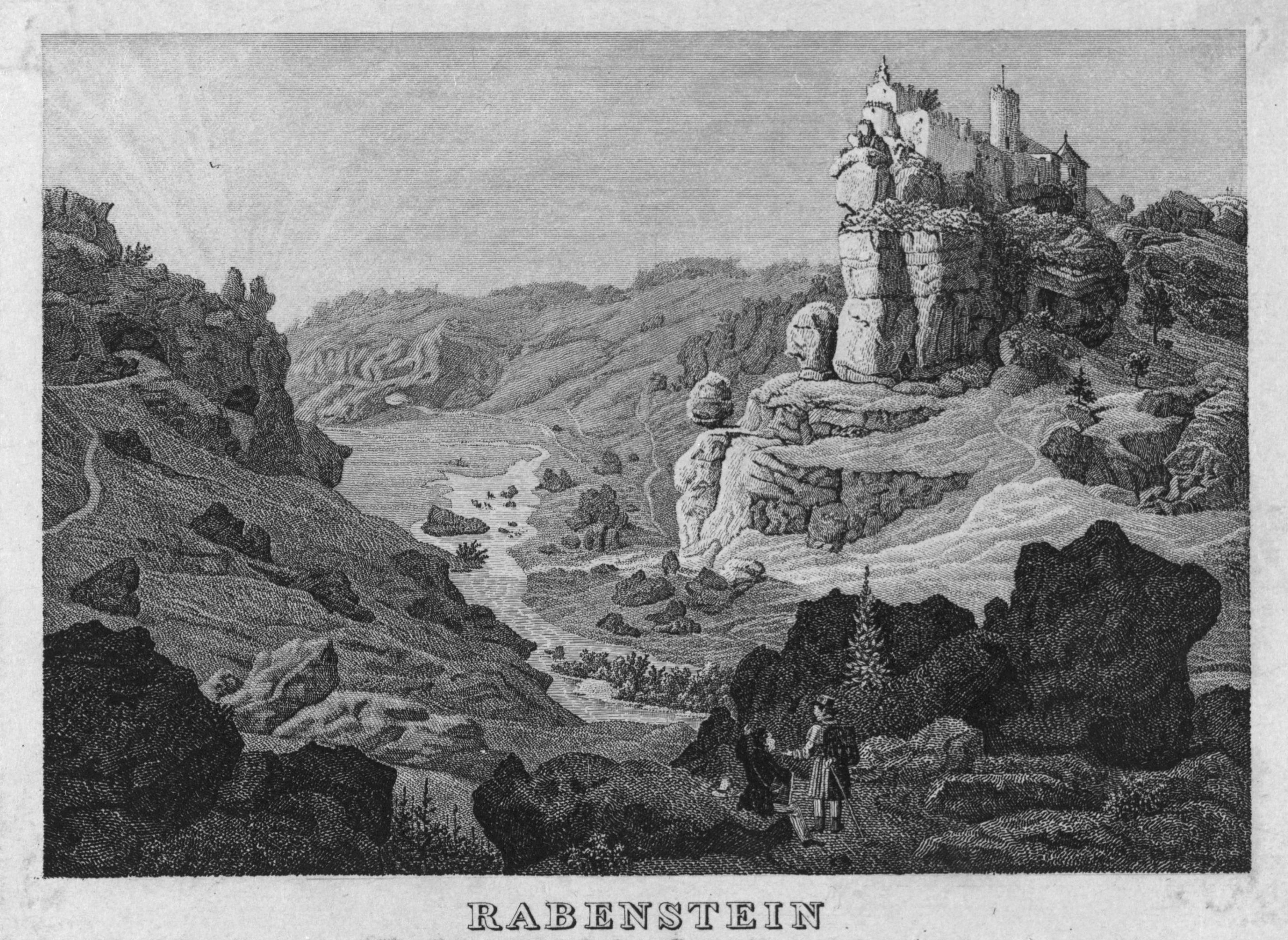
Rabenstein Castle, 1834 steel engraving by Conrad Wießner

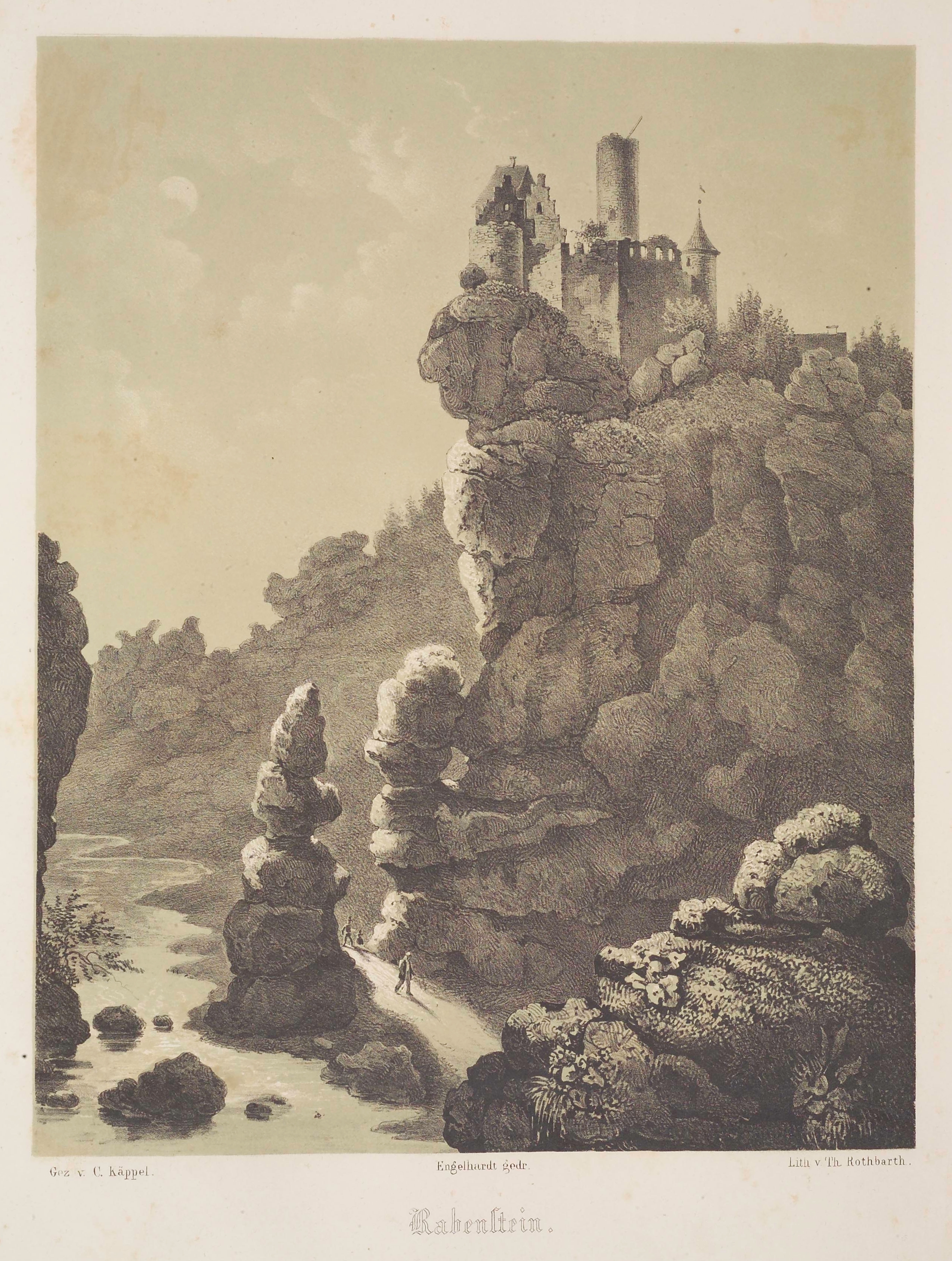
Rabenstein Castle, c. 1840 lithograph by Theodor Rothbarth based on a drawing by Carl Käppel

== Present use ==
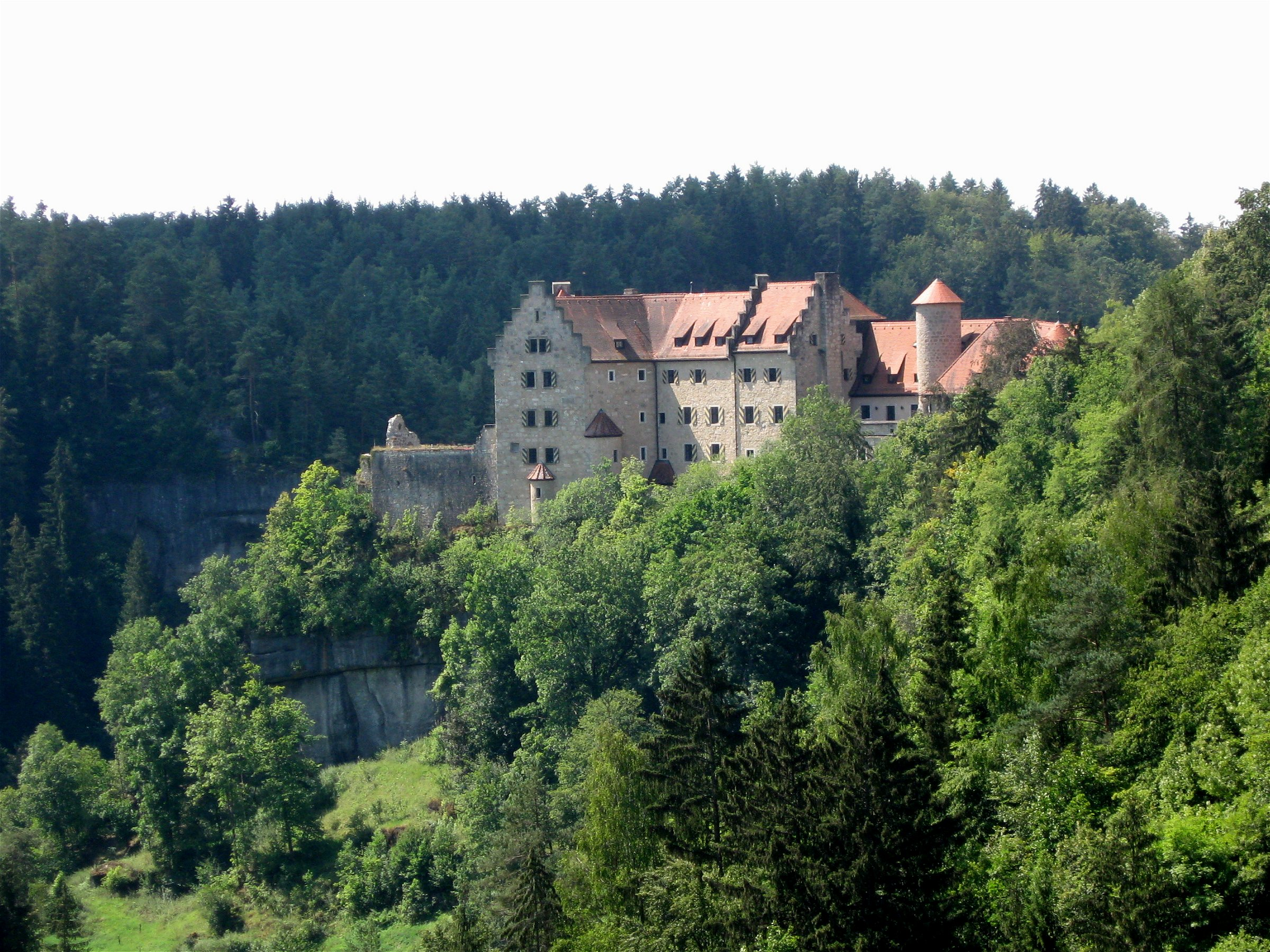
Rabenstein Castle, east side (2009)

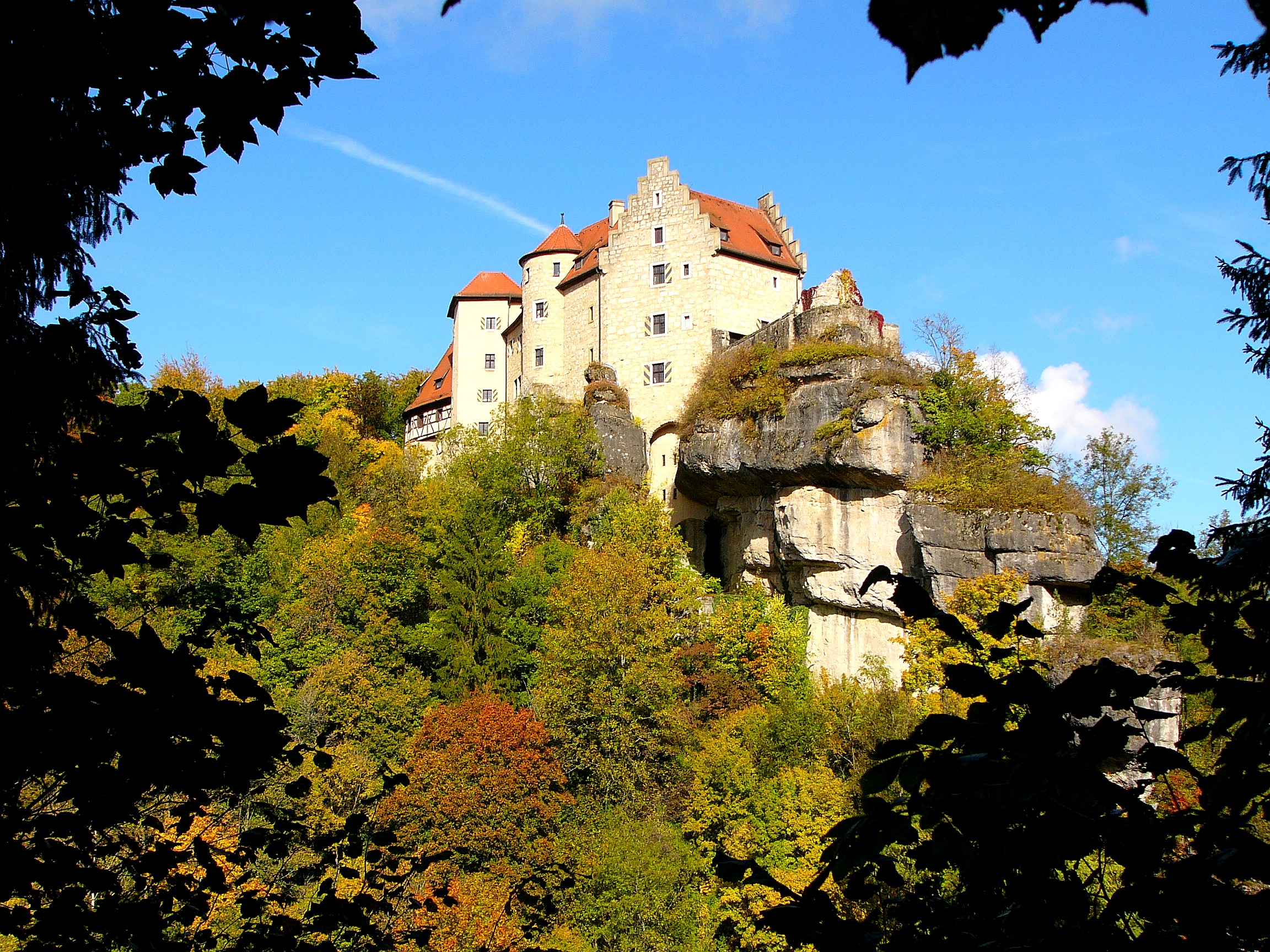
View of Rabenstein Castle from the south (October 2012)

In the recent past, the castle was converted into a hotel for events and conferences. As well as the castle, there is a falconry used for research and education, which has over 80 species of birds of prey and a café with a beer garden. The castle has been used as a filming location, most notably as Schloss Ritter, the home of Gabriel Knight in the video game Gabriel Knight 2: The Beast Within.

== Literature ==
- Kai Kellermann: Herrschaftliche Gärten in der Fränkischen Schweiz - Eine Spurensuche. Verlag Palm & Enke, Erlangen and Jena 2008, ISBN 978-3-7896-0683-0, pp. 184–205.
- Paul Österreicher: Geschichte der Burg und des Ritterguts Rabenstein. Bamberg, 1830, c. 100 pages (full text)
- Hellmut Kunstmann: Die Burgen der östlichen Fränkischen Schweiz. Kommissionsverlag Ferdinand Schöningh, Würzburg, 1965, pp. 189–217.
- Joachim Zeune, et al.: Führer zu archäologischen Denkmälern in Deutschland, Vol. 20: Fränkische Schweiz. Konrad Theiss Verlag, Stuttgart, 1990, ISBN 3-8062-0586-8, p. 133.
- Gustav Voit, Walter Rüfer: Eine Burgenreise durch die Fränkische Schweiz. Verlag Palm & Enke, Erlangen, 1991, ISBN 3-7896-0064-4, pp. 155–159.
- Gustav Voit, Brigitte Kaulich, Walter Rüfer: Vom Land im Gebirg zur Fränkischen Schweiz - Eine Landschaft wird entdeckt. (Schriftenreihe des Fränkische-Schweiz-Vereins, Vol. 8) Verlag Palm und Enke, Erlangen, 1992, ISBN 3-7896-0511-5, pp. 143–145.
- Toni Eckert, Susanne Fischer, Renate Freitag, Rainer Hofmann, Walter Tausendpfund: Die Burgen der Fränkischen Schweiz: Ein Kulturführer. Gürtler Druck, Forchheim, 1997, ISBN 3-9803276-5-5, pp. 130–135.
- Gustav Voit, Heinz Stark, Volker Alberti: Burgen, Ruinen und Herrensitze der Fränkischen Schweiz. Herausgegeben von der Altnürnberger Landschaft e.V., Lauf, 1998, ISBN 3-924158-34-7, pp. 33ff.
- Ursula Pfistermeister: Wehrhaftes Franken - Band 3: Burgen, Kirchenburgen, Stadtmauern um Bamberg, Bayreuth und Coburg. Fachverlag Hans Carl GmbH, Nuremberg, 2002, ISBN 3-418-00387-7, pp. 104–106.
- Rüdiger Bauriedel, Ruprecht Konrad-Röder: Mittelalterliche Befestigungen und niederadelige Ansitze im Landkreis Bayreuth. Ellwanger Druck und Verlag, Bayreuth, 2007, ISBN 978-3-925361-63-0, pp. 152.
