= Open Source Lab =

Open Source Lab may refer to:

- Open-Source Lab (book), a 2014 book by Joshua M. Pearce
- Boston Open Source Science Laboratory, a biology lab in Somerville, MA, United States

== See also ==
- Open source (disambiguation)
