= Open access (disambiguation) =

Open access is unrestricted online access to peer-reviewed scholarly research.

Open access may also refer to:

== Computing, Internet and communication ==
- OpenAccess, a common database initiative in electronic design automation
- Open-access network, a horizontally layered network architecture and business model
- Open Access Same-Time Information System, a policy for transmission service
- Open communication, open access to communications infrastructure and services

== Other uses ==
- Open access (economics), non-excludable resources in economics
- Open Access (UK and Ireland TV channels), a set of commercial television channels on the Sky satellite platform operated from the United Kingdom
- Open access (infrastructure), access to infrastructure such as railways
  - Open-access operator, in rail transport
- Open access, in the right of public access to the wilderness
- Open access mission, synonymous for open admissions policies in higher education
- Open access (publishing), journals that gives open access to its articles
- An unjuried exhibition or festival
  - Fringe festival

== See also ==
- Access rights (disambiguation)
- Open source (disambiguation)
- Public access (disambiguation)
