= Schlüsselberg Castle =

Ruined castle in Pulvermühle, Germany

Schlüsselberg Castle (Burgstall Schlüsselberg)
- Waischenfeld-Pulvermühle
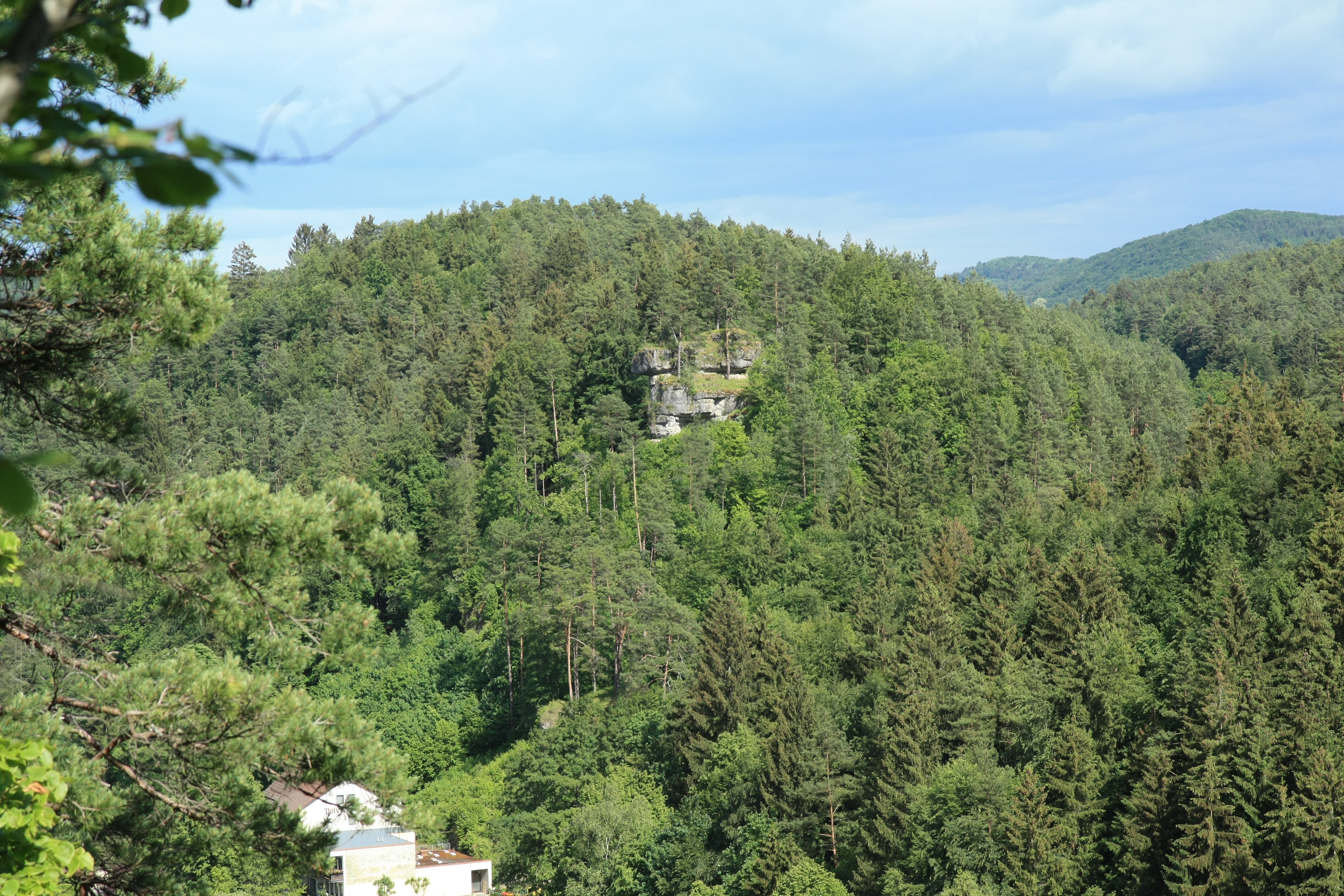
- The castle rocks of Schlüsselberg above the Pulvermühle

Site information
- Type: hill castle, spur castle
- Code: DE-BY
- Condition: Surviving neck ditch

Location
- Coordinates: 49°50′04″N 11°20′45″E
- Height: 410 m above sea level (NN)

Site history
- Built: between 1216 and 1219

Garrison information
- Occupants: free knights, knights

Schlüsselberg Castle (German: Burgstall Schlüsselberg) was a high medieval, aristocratic castle in the Franconian region of Germany. Its ruins lie on a hill above the Pulvermühle, a southern town quarter of Waischenfeld in the Upper Franconian county of Bayreuth in Bavaria.

The burgstall of the castle is freely accessible.

== Location ==
The castle site is located within the Franconian Switzerland-Veldenstein Forest Nature Park on the Schlüsselberg, a hill also called the Galgenberg ("gallows hill"), in the valley of the Wiesent. The rocky spur on which the castle stood had the shape of a key (Schlüssel), so perhaps the castle was named after the local landmark.

Immediately above the mill of Pulvermühle ("Powder Mill"), which used to be known as the Schlüsselmühle ("Schlüssel Mill"), can be seen the rocks and the site or burgstall of the former spur castle at a height of 410 m above sea level (NN).

The easiest way to reach the old castle is from the eastern side of the Galgenberg. There, near a monument on the edge of the wood, a path enters the trees. Visitors should follow the path until they reach a sharp curve. This is in the neck ditch of the castle.

In the vicinity of Schlüsselberg are other castles and ruins. To the north are the ruins of Waischenfeld Castle with its tower, the Steinerner Beutel and the former Schloss Gutenbiegen near the eponymous village; to the southeast are Rabenstein Castle and the burgställe of Wal zum hohen Loch and Alte Veste. Further down the Wiesent valley stands Rabeneck Castle. Directly opposite the Galgenberg on the Kreuzberg was another, probably prehistorical, fortification.

== Literature ==
- Rüdiger Bauriedel, Ruprecht Konrad-Röder: Mittelalterliche Befestigungen und niederadelige Ansitze im Landkreis Bayreuth. Ellwanger Druck und Verlag, Bayreuth, 2007, ISBN 978-3-925361-63-0, p. 151.
- Gustav Voit u.a.: Vom Land im Gebirg zur Fränkischen Schweiz. Eine Landschaft wird entdeckt. Verlag Palm & Enke, Erlangen, 1992, ISBN 3-7896-0511-5 (Die Fränkische Schweiz; 8).
- Hellmut Kunstmann: Die Burgen der östlichen Fränkischen Schweiz. Kommissionsverlag Ferdinand Schöningh, Würzburg, 1965, pp. 83–89.
