= Public access =

Public access may refer to:

- Freedom of information laws
- Open access publishing
- Public Access (1993 film), an American drama film
- Public Access (2026 film), an American documentary film
- Public access computer
- Public Access T.V. (band), musical group
- Public-access television
- Public records
- Right of public access to the wilderness

== See also ==
- Access rights (disambiguation)
- Open access (disambiguation)
