= Waischenfeld Castle =

Castle in Germany

- Waischenfeld
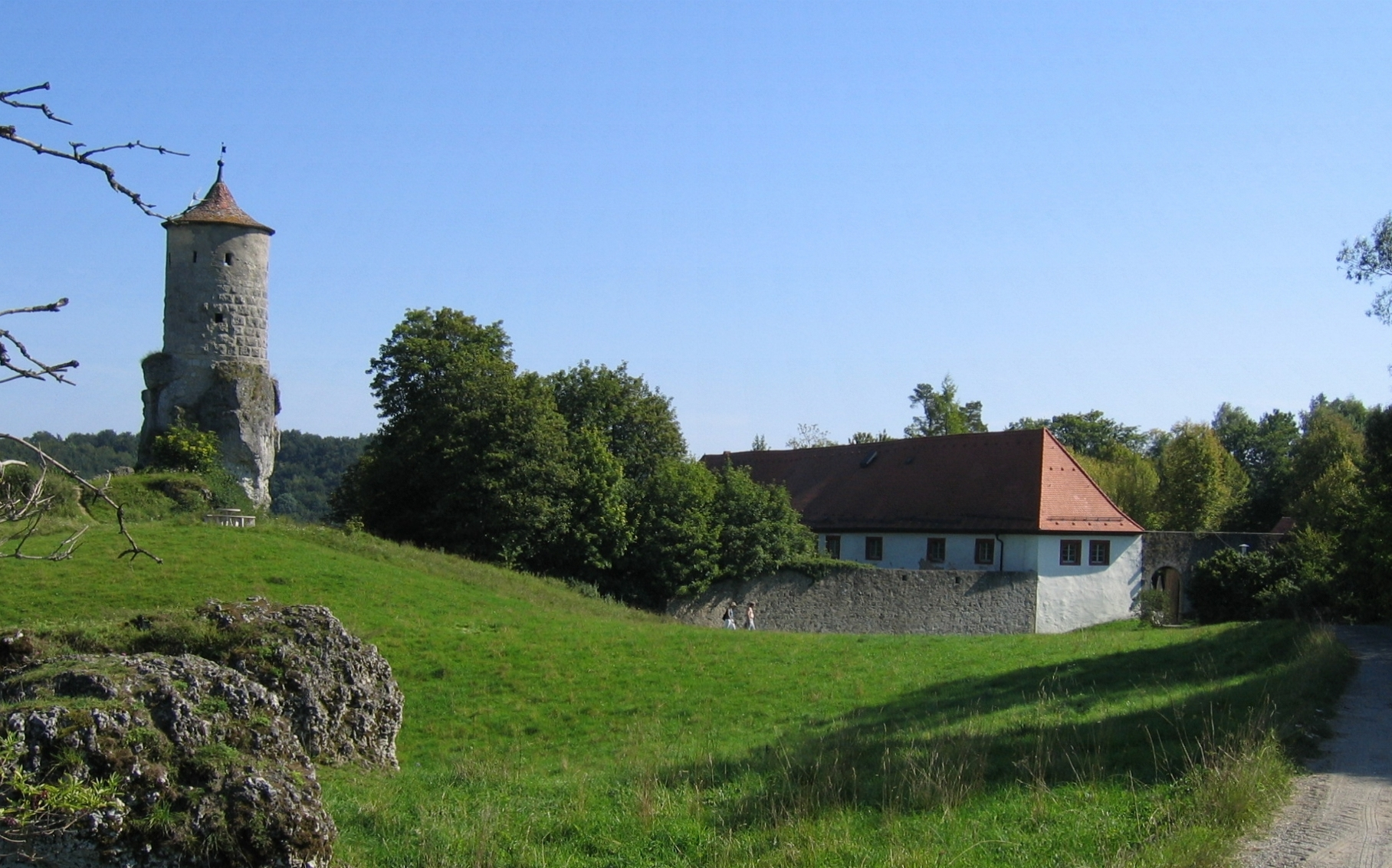
- Fortified tower of Steinerner Beutel and Waischenfeld Castle

Site information
- Type: hill castle, rock castle
- Code: DE-BY
- Condition: ruin

Location
- Coordinates: 49°50′42″N 11°20′34″E

Site history
- Built: first mentioned 1122

Garrison information
- Occupants: free nobility

Waischenfeld Castle (German: Burgruine Waischenfeld) is a ruined rock castle on a rocky plateau a few metres west of the town of Waischenfeld in the province of Upper Franconia in the German state of Bavaria.

== History ==
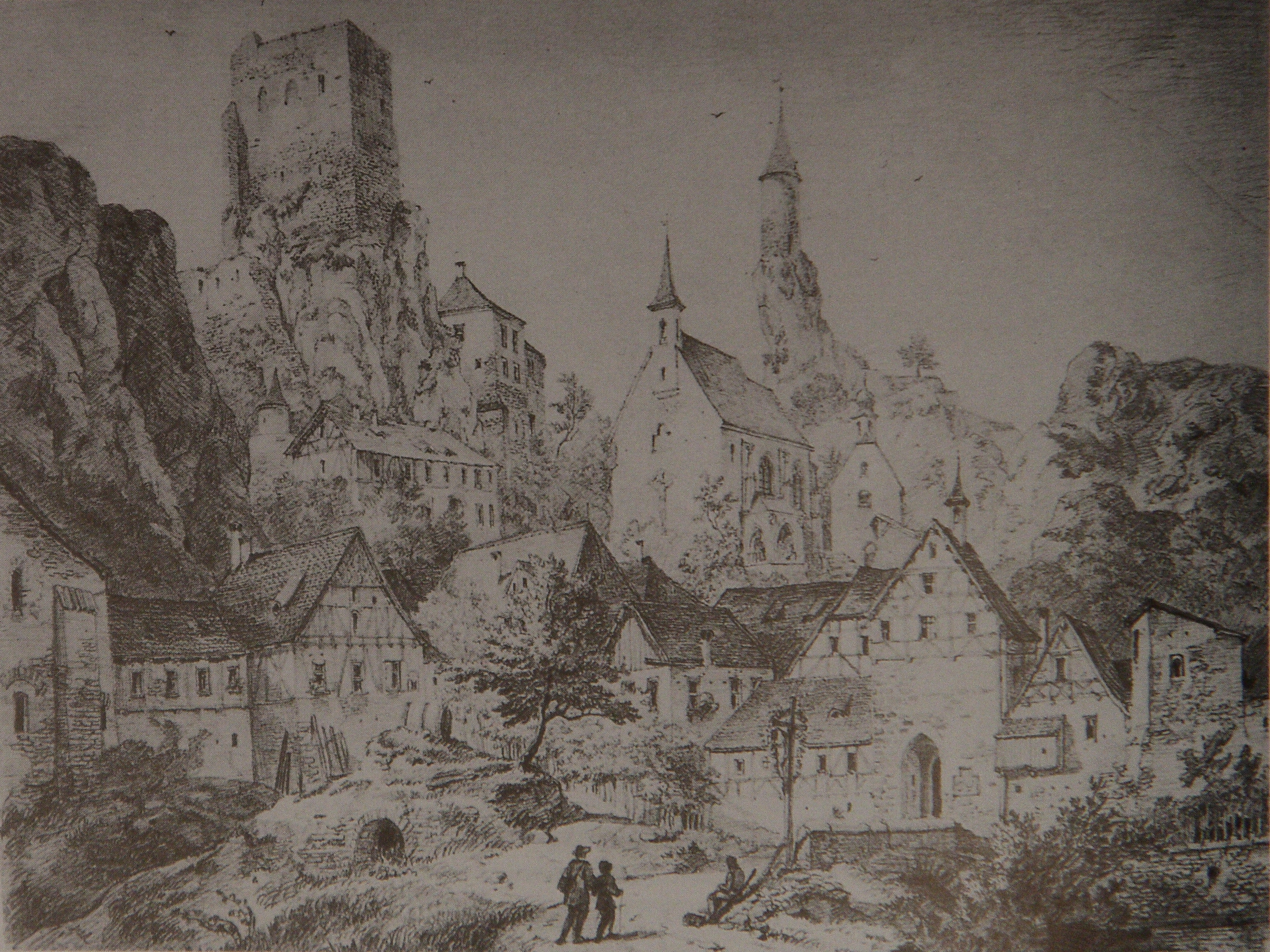
Waischenfeld Castle, pencil drawing (c. 1830) by Domenico Quaglio the Younger

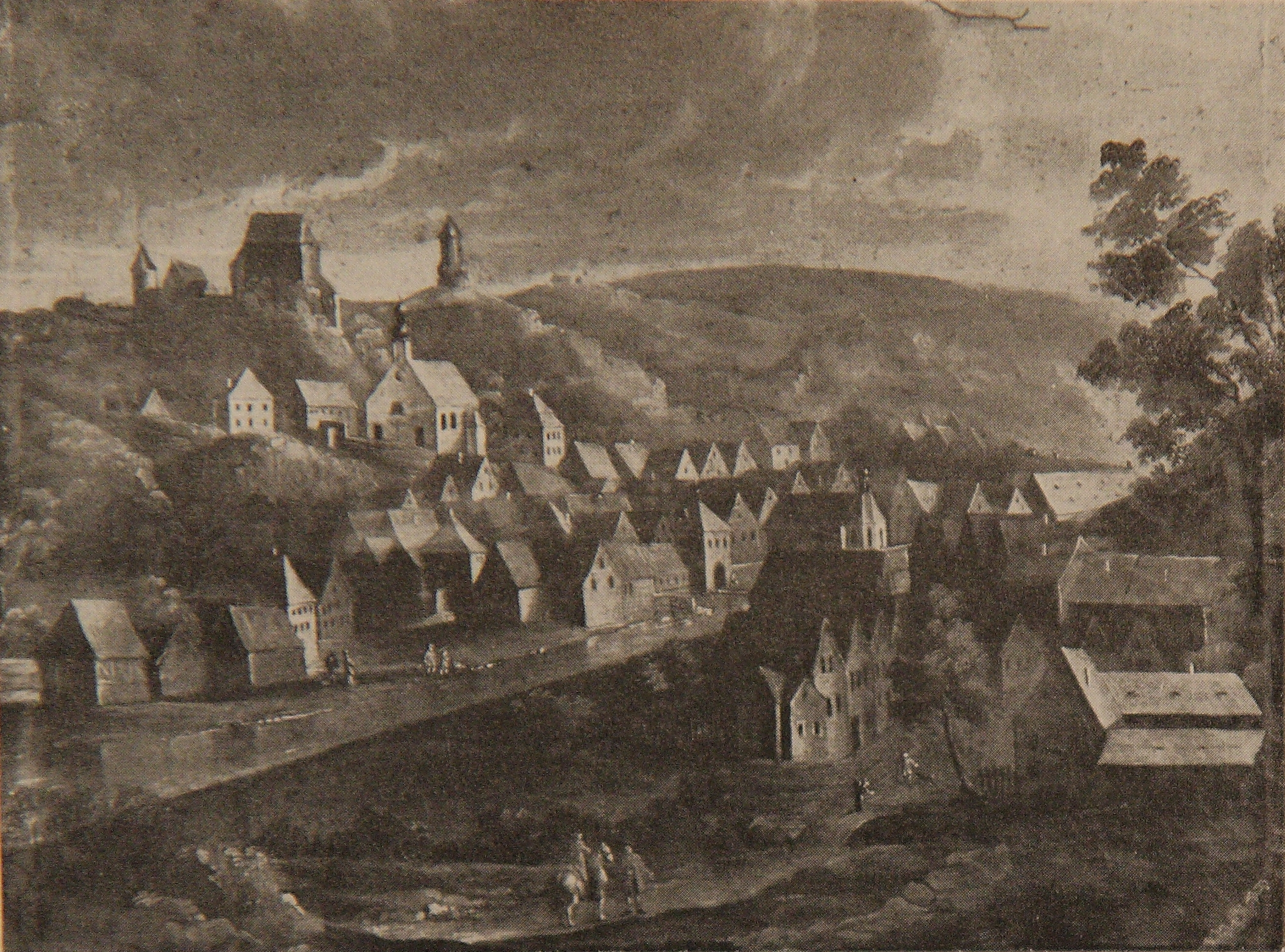
Waischenfeld Castle, from a painting (1802) by Sebastian Förtsch

The first clues to a castle in the village of Waischenfeld date to 1079, when Wirint von Waischenfeld was mentioned in the records as a member of an important noble family in the area of the middle Wiesent. The Waischenfelds were related to the dynastic family of the lords of Aufseß.

The hill castle was first recorded in 1122 as Urbs. Following the death of Ulrich of Waischenfeld, the last in the Waischenfeld family line, in 1216 the castle and lordship of Waischenfeld went to Eberhard III of Greifenstein, who built a new fortress south of Waischenfeld, Schlüsselberg Castle. After the death of Conrad II of Schlüsselberg, the castle and town of Waischenfeld went in 1348 into the hands of the Bishopric of Bamberg.

In 1430 the castle was badly damaged during the Hussite Wars; it was then re-enfeoffed by the bishopric to the nobility between 1438 and 1552. It was destroyed again between 1552 and 1553 during the Second Margrave War, in which Margrave Albert Alcibiades of Brandenburg-Kulmbach fought mainly against the (Catholic) bishoprics in order to try to gain a supremacy in Franconia. During the conflict the castle was captured three times by the margrave's troops; after being plundered it was razed on 7 June 1553.

From about 1600, the old castle was used as a grain store and slowly fell into disrepair. The ruins were finally demolished in 1876/77 and 1889.

== Description ==
The tower known as the Steinerner Beutel ("Stone Bag") is the symbol of the town of Waischenfeld. The Romanesque round tower is roughly 13 metres high and stands on a limestone crag. It belongs to the northernmost part of the castle, the Rüssenbach castle estate. The tower was originally a bergfried or bergfried-like watchtower with an elevated entrance.

== Literature ==
- Rüdiger Bauriedel, Ruprecht Konrad-Röder: Mittelalterliche Befestigungen und niederadelige Ansitze im Landkreis Bayreuth. Ellwanger Druck und Verlag, Bayreuth, 2007, ISBN 978-3-925361-63-0, p. 151.
- Hans-Michael Körner, Alois Schmid (eds.), Martin Ott: Handbuch der historischen Stätten. Bayern II Franken. Alfred Kröner Verlag, Stuttgart, 2006, ISBN 978-3-520-32501-3, pp. 564–565.
- Ursula Pfistermeister: Wehrhaftes Franken - Band 3: Burgen, Kirchenburgen, Stadtmauern um Bamberg, Bayreuth und Coburg. Fachverlag Hans Carl GmbH, Nuremberg, 2002, ISBN 3-418-00387-7, p. 126.
- Ruth Bach-Damaskinos, Peter Borowitz: Schlösser und Burgen in Oberfranken – Eine vollständige Darstellung aller Schlösser, Herrensitze, Burgen und Ruinen in den oberfränkischen kreisfreien Städten und Landkreisen. Verlag A. Hofmann, Nuremberg, 1996, ISBN 3-87191-212-3, pp. 50–51.
- Gustav Voit, Brigitte Kaulich, Walter Rüfer: Vom Land im Gebirg zur Fränkischen Schweiz - Eine Landschaft wird entdeckt. (Schriftenreihe des Fränkische-Schweiz-Vereins, Band 8) Verlag Palm und Enke, Erlangen, 1992, ISBN 3-7896-0511-5, pp. 162–167.
- Gustav Voit, Walter Rüfer: Eine Burgenreise durch die Fränkische Schweiz. Verlag Palm & Enke, Erlangen, 1991, ISBN 3-7896-0064-4, pp. 210–214.
- Björn-Uwe Abels, Joachim Zeune, et al.: Führer zu archäologischen Denkmälern in Deutschland, Band 20: Fränkische Schweiz. Konrad Theiss Verlag GmbH und Co., Stuttgart, 1990, ISBN 3-8062-0586-8, pp. 227–229.
- Hellmut Kunstmann: Die Burgen der östlichen Fränkischen Schweiz. Kommissionsverlag Ferdinand Schöningh, Würzburg, 1965, pp. 90–131.
- Toni Eckert, Susanne Fischer, Renate Freitag, Rainer Hofmann, Walter Tausendpfund: Die Burgen der Fränkischen Schweiz: Ein Kulturführer. Gebietsausschuss Fränkische Schweiz o.J., ISBN 3-9803276-5-5, pp. 179–184.
