= Open source (disambiguation) =

Open source products include permission to use the source code, design documents, or content of the product.

Open source may also refer to:

== Computing ==
=== Software ===
- Open-source license, a type of license for computer software and other products that allows the source code, blueprint or design to be used, modified and/or shared under defined terms and conditions
- Open-source model, a decentralized software development model
- Open-source software, a type of computer software in which source code is released under a license in which the copyright holder grants users the rights to study, change, and distribute it
- Free and open-source software, openly shared source code that is licensed without any restrictions on usage, modification, or distribution

=== Hardware ===
- Open-source hardware, or open hardware, computer hardware, such as microprocessors, that is designed in the same fashion as open source software
- Open-source robotics, physical artifacts of the subject are offered by the open design movement
- Open-source product development, collaborative product and process openness of open-source hardware for any interested participants

== Manufacturing ==
- Open-source appropriate technology, is designed for environmental, ethical, cultural, social, political, economic, and community aspects
- Open-source architecture, emerging procedures in imagination and formation of virtual and real spaces within an inclusive universal infrastructure
- Open-source cola, cola soft drinks made to open-sourced recipes
- Open Source Ecology, a network of farmers, engineers, architects and supporters striving to manufacture the Global Village Construction Set

== Media ==
- Open-source film, open source movies
- Open-source journalism, a spectrum on online publications, various publishing forms, and content voting
- Open-source record label, open source music
- "Open Source", a 1960s rock song performed by The Magic Mushrooms
- Open Source (film), an American action thriller film
- Open Source (radio show), a radio show using open content information gathering methods hosted by Christopher Lydon
- "Open Source", a 2020 album released by Brazilian Heavy Metal guitarist Kiko Loureiro

== Other uses ==
- Open-source intelligence, data collected from publicly available sources
- Open-source curriculum, an online instructional resource that can be freely used, distributed and modified
- Open-source governance, open source in government
- Open Source Order of the Golden Dawn, an esoteric community
- Open-source religion, in the creation of belief systems
- Open-source unionism, a model for labor union organization

== See also ==
- Open access (disambiguation)
- Open-source software advocacy
- Open-source software development
- Open-source-software movement
- Open-source video game
- The Open Source Definition, as used by the Open Source Initiative for open source software
- Open Source Lab (disambiguation)
