= House of Schlüsselberg =

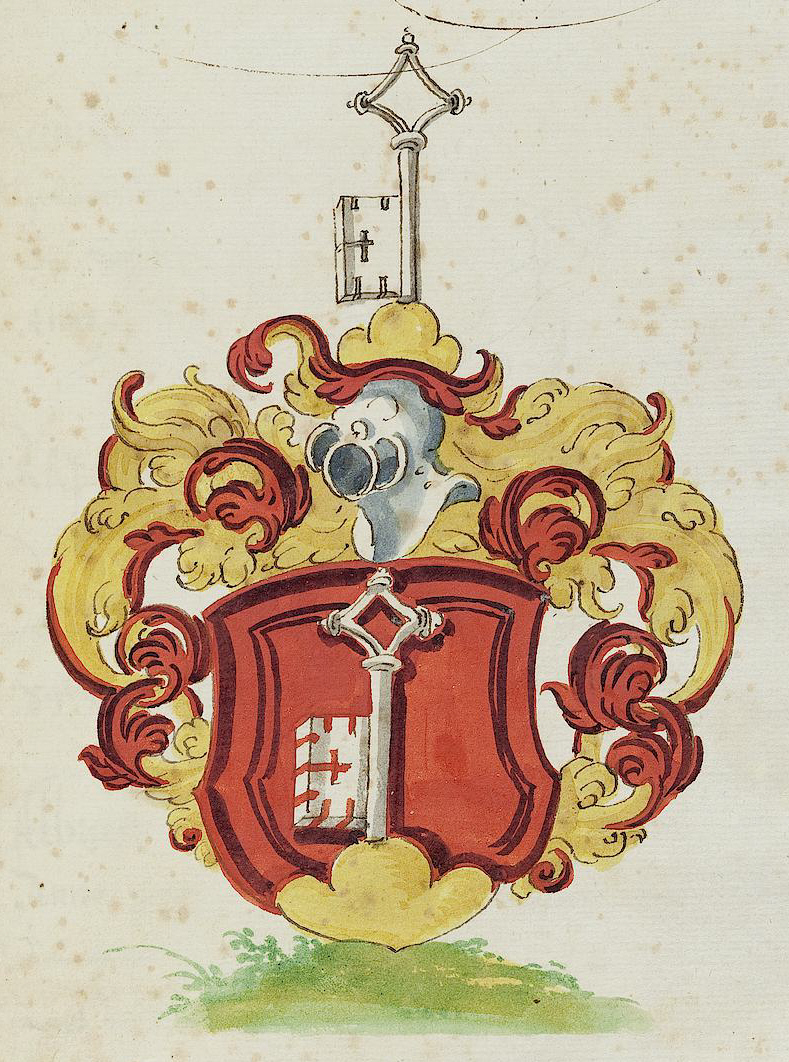
Coat of arms of the "counts of Schlüsselberg" by David Wolleber

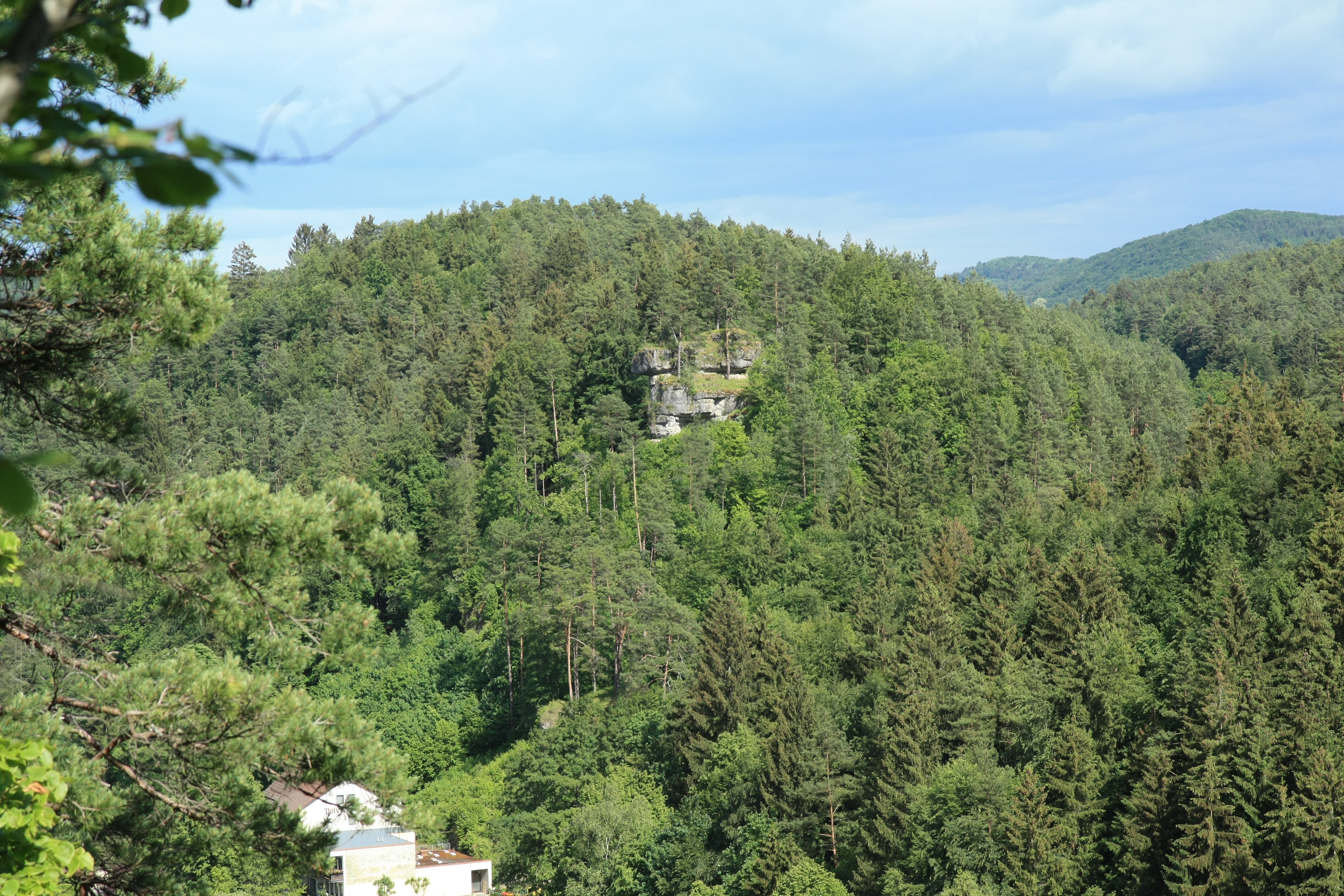
The burgstall of the castle that gave the family their name: Schlüsselberg near Waischenfeld

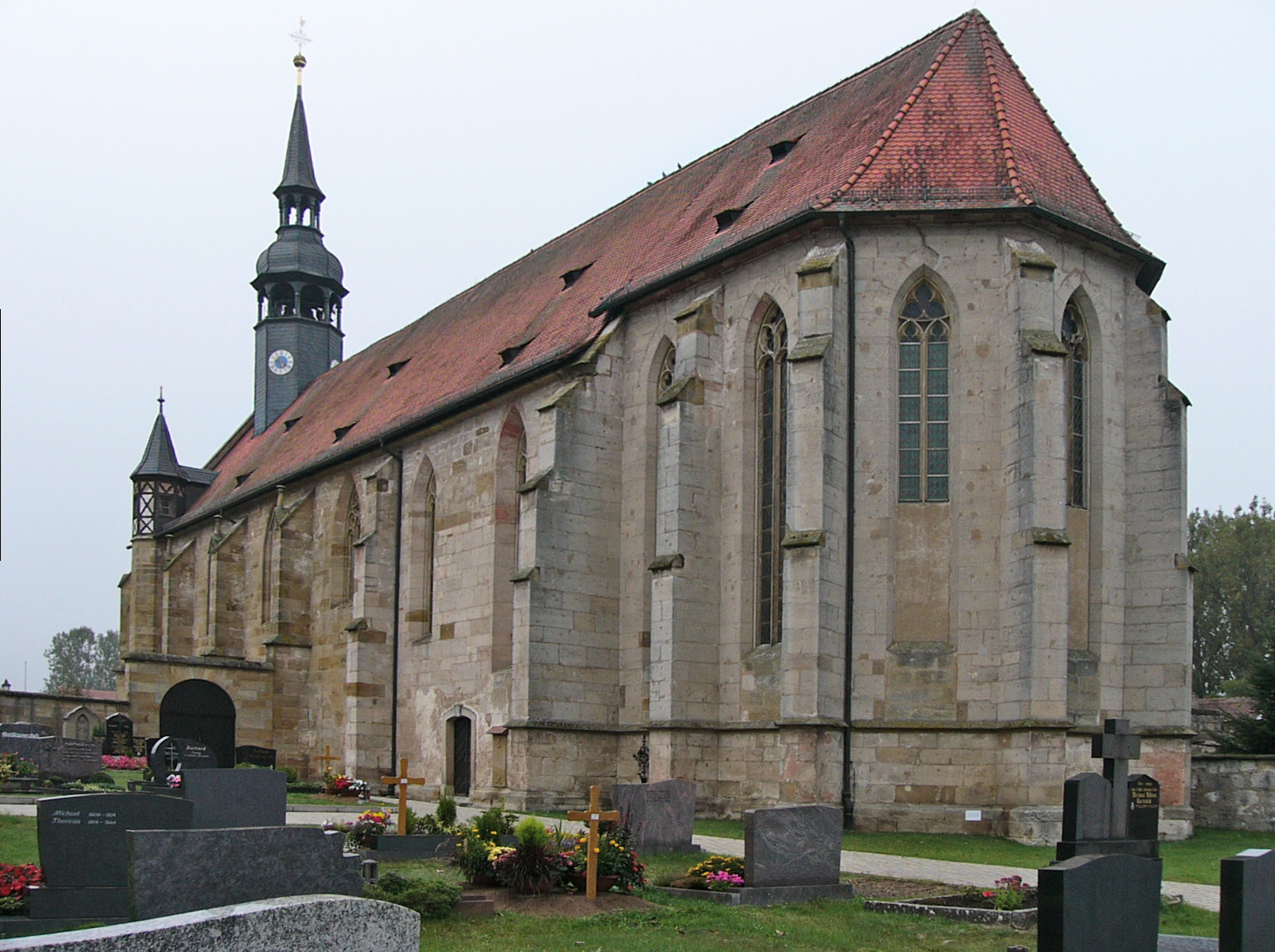
Schlüsselau Abbey: founded by Eberhard IV of Schlüsselberg and his sons, Conrad I and Godfrey

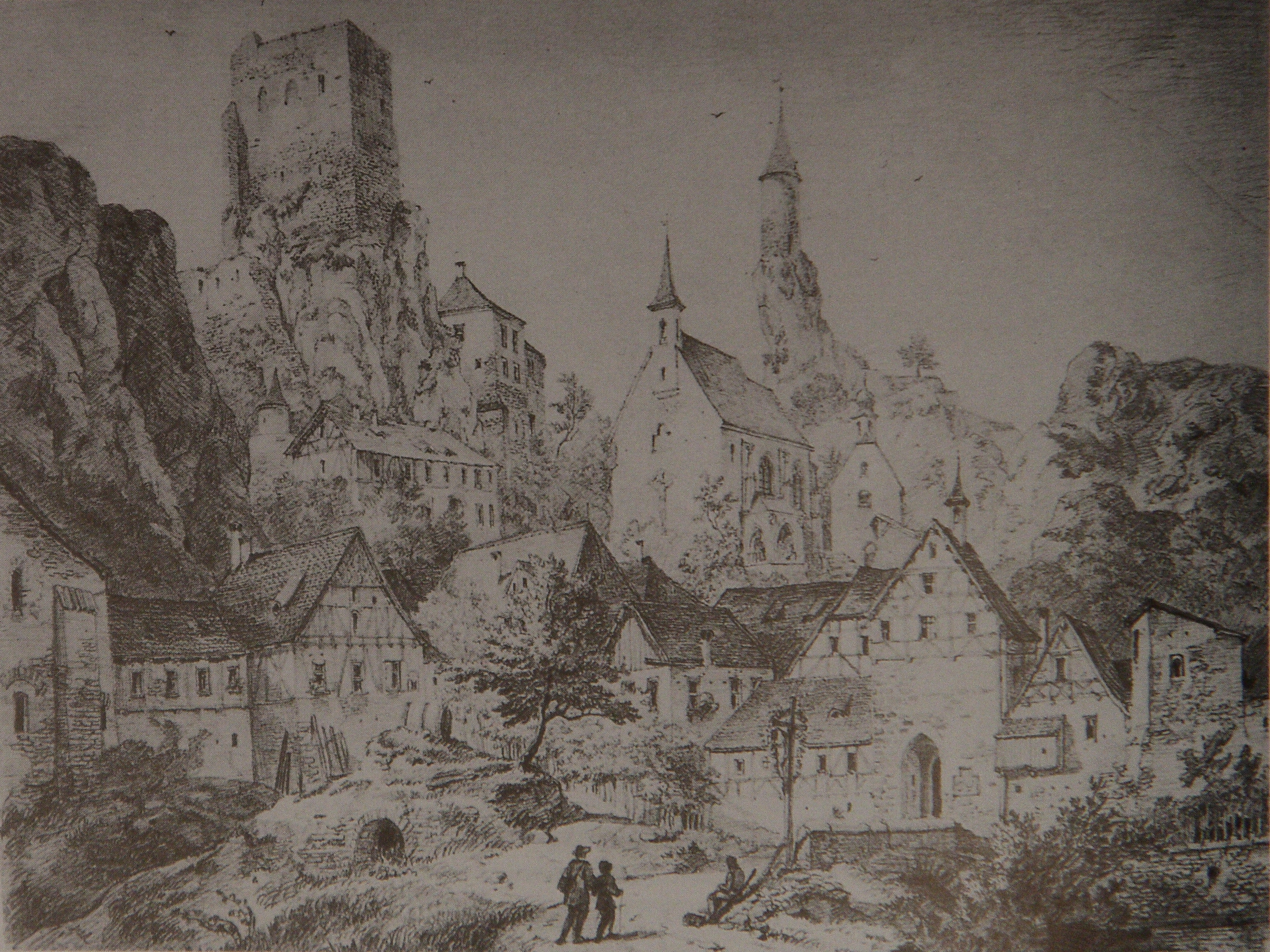
Castle ruins and town of Waischenfeld (Domenico Quaglio c. 1830)

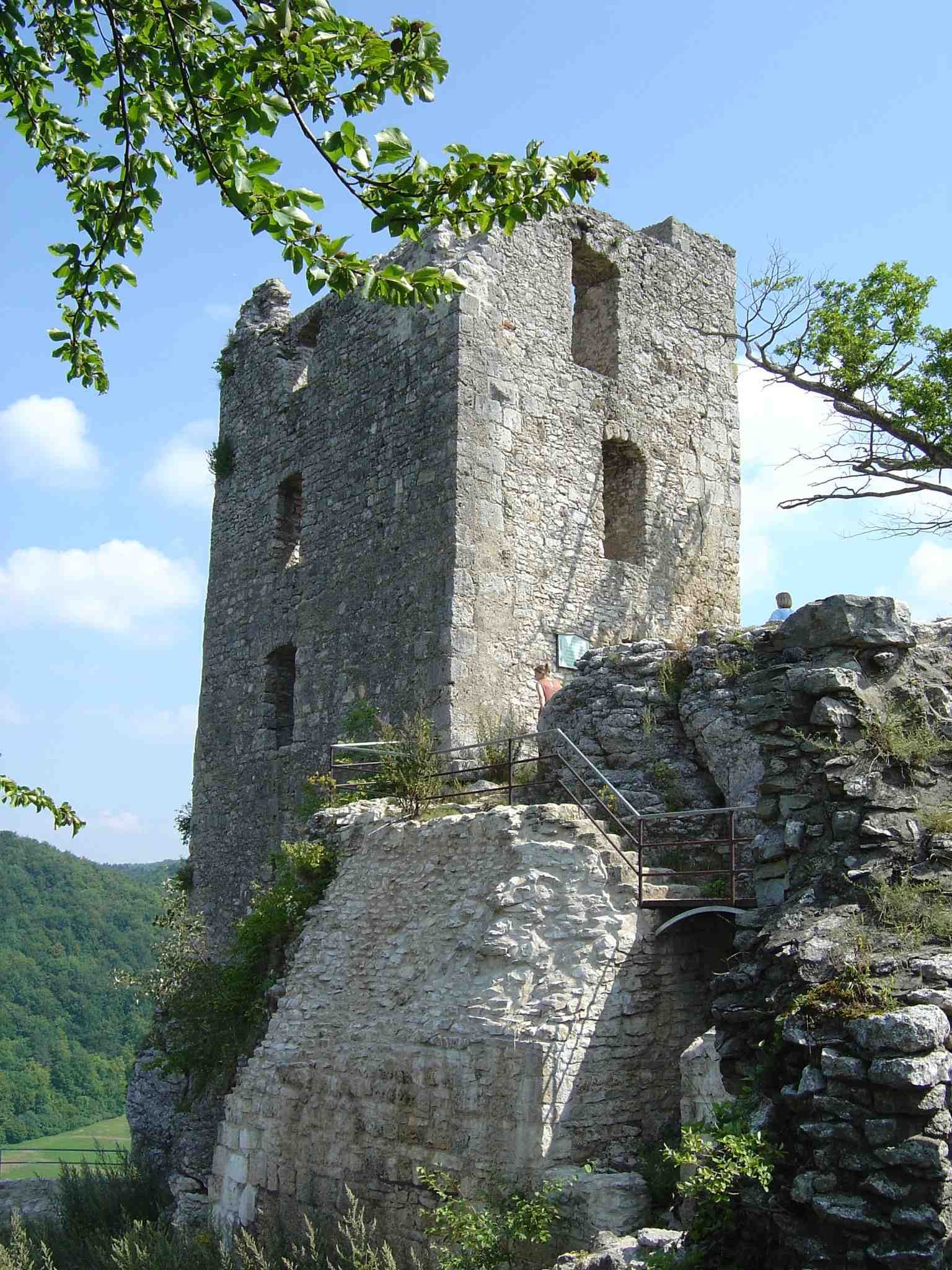
Neideck Castle where Conrad II, the last representative of the house, was killed

The House of Schlüsselberg was a Franconian aristocratic family which was a member of the high nobility. Until it died out in 1347, the family was able to establish itself firmly in the region of Franconian Switzerland and turned out to be unwelcome competition for the bishops of Bamberg. The Schlüsselbergs founded inter alia the town of a number of Schlüsselfeld in 1336 as well as Schlüsselau Abbey.

== Members of the family ==
- Eberhard I of Schlüsselberg (died 1243), married to a Swabian countess of Eberstein, founded the House of Schlüsselberg in 1216
- Eberhard II of Schlüsselberg (died 1283), founder of Schlüsselau Abbey (1280), married to Elisabeth of Hohenzollern-Nuremberg
- Conrad I of Schlüsselberg (died 1308), son of Eberhard II and co-founder of Schlüsselau Abbey
- Godfrey of Schlüsselberg (died 1308), son of Eberhard II and co-founder of Schlüsselau Abbey, first marriage to Mechthild of Wertheim and second to Margreth of Katzenelnbogen
- Gisela of Schlüsselberg (died 1308), daughter of Eberhard II and first abbess of Schlüsselau Abbey
- Ulrich of Schlüsselberg (died 1322), son of Eberhard II, selected (from a list of two), but not installed as Bishop of Bamberg (1318–1321), Bishop of Brixen in 1322
- Conrad II of Schlüsselberg (died 1347), son of Conrad I, first marriage to Lukardis of Hohenzollern-Nuremberg and second marriage to Agnes of Württemberg, Reichssturmfähnrich from 1322 to 1336
- Elisabeth of Schlüsselberg (died nach 1350), daughter of Godfrey (first marriage), married to Count Conrad of Vaihingen
- Richza of Schlüsselberg (died 1348), daughter of Conrad II (first marriage), married to Count Günther XVIII of Schwarzburg-Wachsenburg
- Beatrice of Schlüsselberg (1364), daughter of Conrad II (first marriage), married to Count Ulrich VI of Helfenstein, son of Conrad second wife, Agnes of Württemberg-Helfenstein (first marriage)
- Anna of Schlüsselberg (died 1379), daughter of Conrad II and Lukardis, nun and, from 1339, Abbess of Schlüsselau Abbey
- Hildegard of Schlüsselberg, daughter of Conrad II (second marriage), married to Eitel Frederick of Zollern
- Sophia of Schlüsselberg (died after 1360), probably the sister of Conrad II, married to Frederick III, the old knight, of Hohenzollern-Schalksburg, who complained in 1360 against the Bishop of Bamberg over hereditary titles.

=== Related noble families ===
- Eberstein in Swabia
- Gründlach in Franconia
- Helfenstein and Württemberg in Swabia
- Hohenzollern-Hechingen in Swabia, Hohenzollern-Nürnberg in Franconia

and Hohenzollern-Schalksburg in Swabia

- Leuchtenberg in Franconia
- Montfort in Swabia
- Wachsenburg side line of the counts of Schwarzburg in Thuringia and Franconia
- Vaihingen in Swabia
- Wertheim in Franconia

== Literature ==
- Rudolf Endres: Konrad von Schlüsselberg. In: Gerhard Pfeiffer (ed.): Fränkische Lebensbilder. Vol. 4. Kommissionsverlag Ferdinand Schöningh, Würzburg, 1971, (Veröffentlichungen der Gesellschaft für Fränkische Geschichte, Reihe VII A. Band 4), pp. 27–48.
- Rudolf Endres (2007). "Schlüsselberg, von". Neue Deutsche Biographie (in German). Vol. 23. Berlin: Duncker & Humblot. pp. 110–111. (full text online).
- Paul Oesterreicher: Der Reichsherr Gottfried von Schlüsselberg. Ein geschichtlicher Abriß. Mit den Geschlechtstafeln der Reichsherren von Schlüsselberg und von Weischenfeld. Verlag des Verfassers. Bamberg 1821. Google
- Paul Österreicher: Neue Beiträge zur Geschichte der ehemaligen Reichsherrschaft Schlüsselberg. Bamberg, 1823.
- Paul Oesterreicher: Geschichte und Beschreibung des Radenzgaues und des ursprünglichen Bisthums Bamberg. Bamberg, 1832. Google
- Hermann Römer: Markgröningen im Rahmen der Landesgeschichte I., Urgeschichte und Mittelalter. Markgröningen, 1933, pp. 111–121.
- Gustav Voit, Brigitte Kaulich, Walter Rüfer: Vom Land im Gebirg zur Fränkischen Schweiz. Eine Landschaft wird entdeckt. Palm und Enke, Erlangen, 1992, ISBN 3-7896-0511-5 (Die Fränkische Schweiz - Landschaft und Kultur 8).
- Gustav Voit: Die Schlüsselberger. Geschichte eines fränkischen Adelsgeschlechtes. Nuremberg, 1988.
- Voigt, Gustav; der Adel am Obermain. Die Plassenburg – Schriften für Heimatforschung und Kulturpflege in Ostfranken, Vol. 28, Kulmbach, 1969.
