= Öffnungsrecht =

Öffnungsrecht in the Middle Ages was the right of a liege lord, more specifically a territorial lord or protective lord, in the Holy Roman Empire to have gratuitous use of a vassal's castle, fortified house or fortified town as a fighting base in the event of a conflict (e.g. war or feud). It is a form of right of access.

== Literature ==
- Christoph Bachmann: Öffnungsrecht und herzogliche Burgenpolitik in Bayern im späten Mittelalter. Beck, Munich, 1997, ISBN 3-406-10687-0.
- Horst Wolfgang Böhme, Reinhard Friedrich, Barbara Schock-Werner (eds.): Wörterbuch der Burgen, Schlösser und Festungen. Reclam, Stuttgart, 2004, ISBN 3-15-010547-1, p. 193.
- Friedrich Hillebrand: Das Öffnungsrecht bei Burgen, seine Anfänge und seine Entwicklung in den Territorien des 13.-16. Jahrhunderts unter besonderer Berücksichtigung Württembergs. Diss. phil. Tübingen 1967.
