= Waischenfeld =

- Town
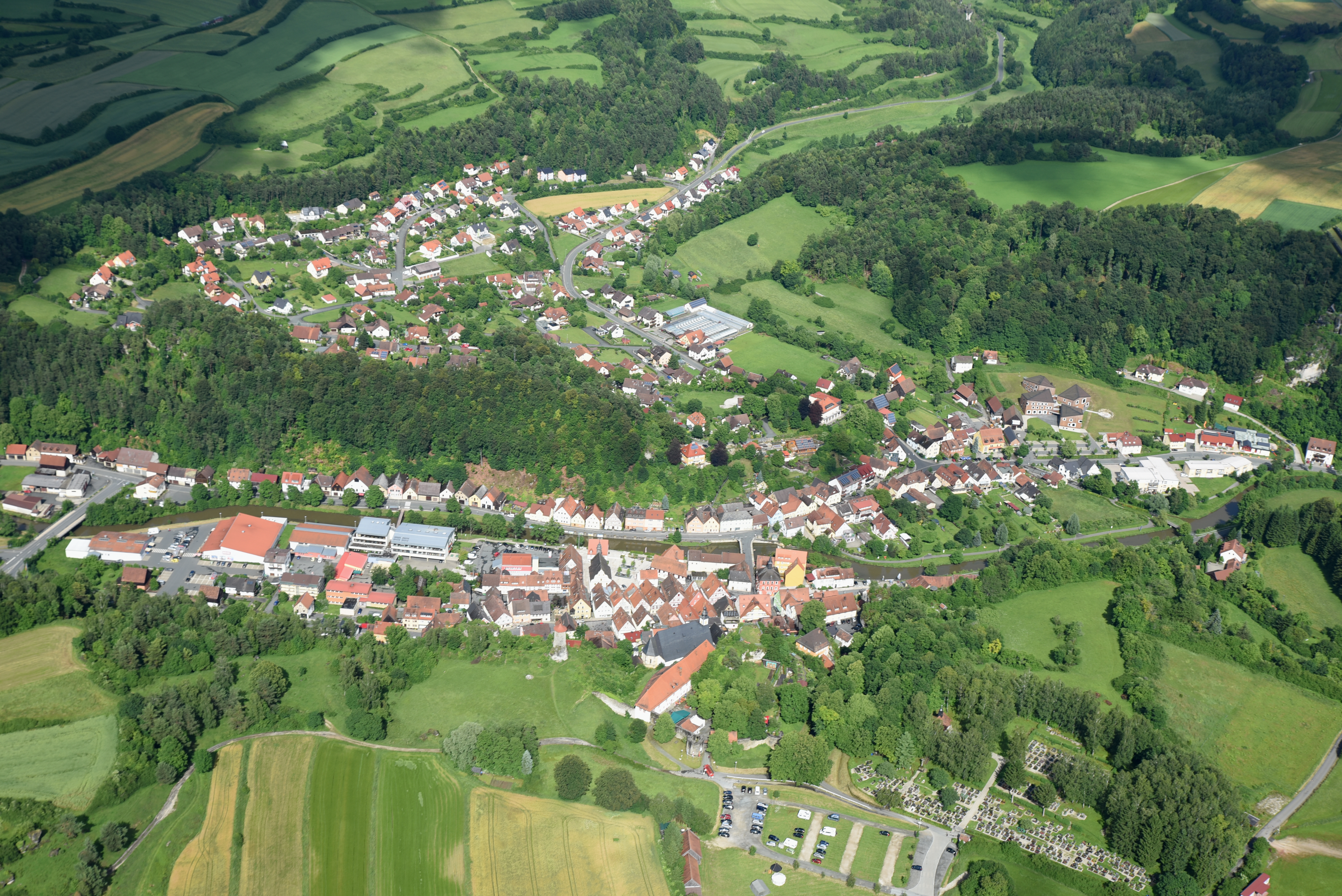
- Aerial view

- Coat of arms

- Location of Waischenfeld within Bayreuth district
- Interactive map of Waischenfeld
- Location within Germany Location within Bavaria
- Coordinates: 49°51′N 11°20′E
- Country: Germany
- State: Bavaria
- Admin. region: Oberfranken
- District: Bayreuth

Government
  - Mayor (2020–26): Thomas Thiem (CSU)

Area
  - Total: 57.93 km^{2} (22.37 sq mi)
- Elevation: 372 m (1,220 ft)

Population (2025-12-31)
  - Total: 2,955
  - Density: 51.01/km^{2} (132.1/sq mi)
- Time zone: UTC+01:00 (CET)
  - Summer (DST): UTC+02:00 (CEST)
- Postal codes: 91344
- Dialling codes: 09202
- Vehicle registration: BT, EBS
- Website: www.waischenfeld.de

Waischenfeld (German pronunciation: [ˈvaɪʃn̩ˌfɛlt]) is a town in the district of Bayreuth, in Bavaria, Germany. It is situated in Franconian Switzerland, 20 km southwest of Bayreuth.

It consists of the following districts: Aalkorb, Breitenlesau, Doos, Eichenbirkig, Gösseldorf, Gutenbiegen, Hammermühle, Hannberg, Heroldsberg, Heroldsberg-Tal, Hubenberg, Köttweinsdorf, Kugelau, Langenloh, Löhlitz, Nankendorf, Neusig, Pulvermühle, Rabeneck, Sauerhof, Saugendorf, Schafhof, Schlößlein, Schönhaid, Schönhof, Seelig, Siegritzberg, Waischenfeld, Zeubach.

The town is the location of Waischenfeld Castle.

== Notable people ==
- Ernst von Bomhard (1833-1912), lawyer, senate president at the Reichsgericht in Leipzig
- Michel Hofmann (1903-1968), State Archives Director in Würzburg, collaborator at the Carl Orff work Carmina Burana
