= Zoggendorf =

Zoggendorf Zoggendorf
- Village
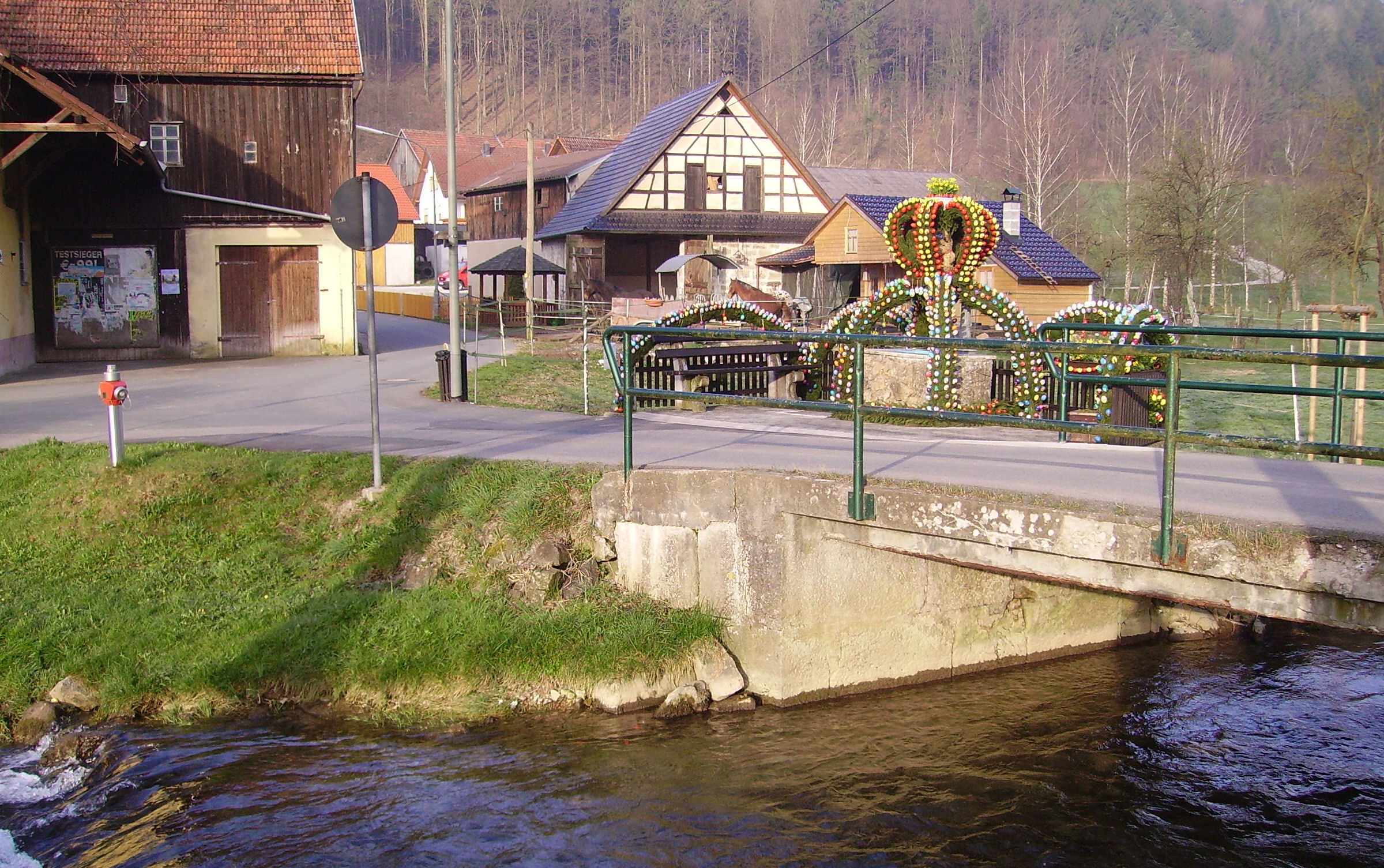
- An image of a few houses and a bridge in Zoggendorf

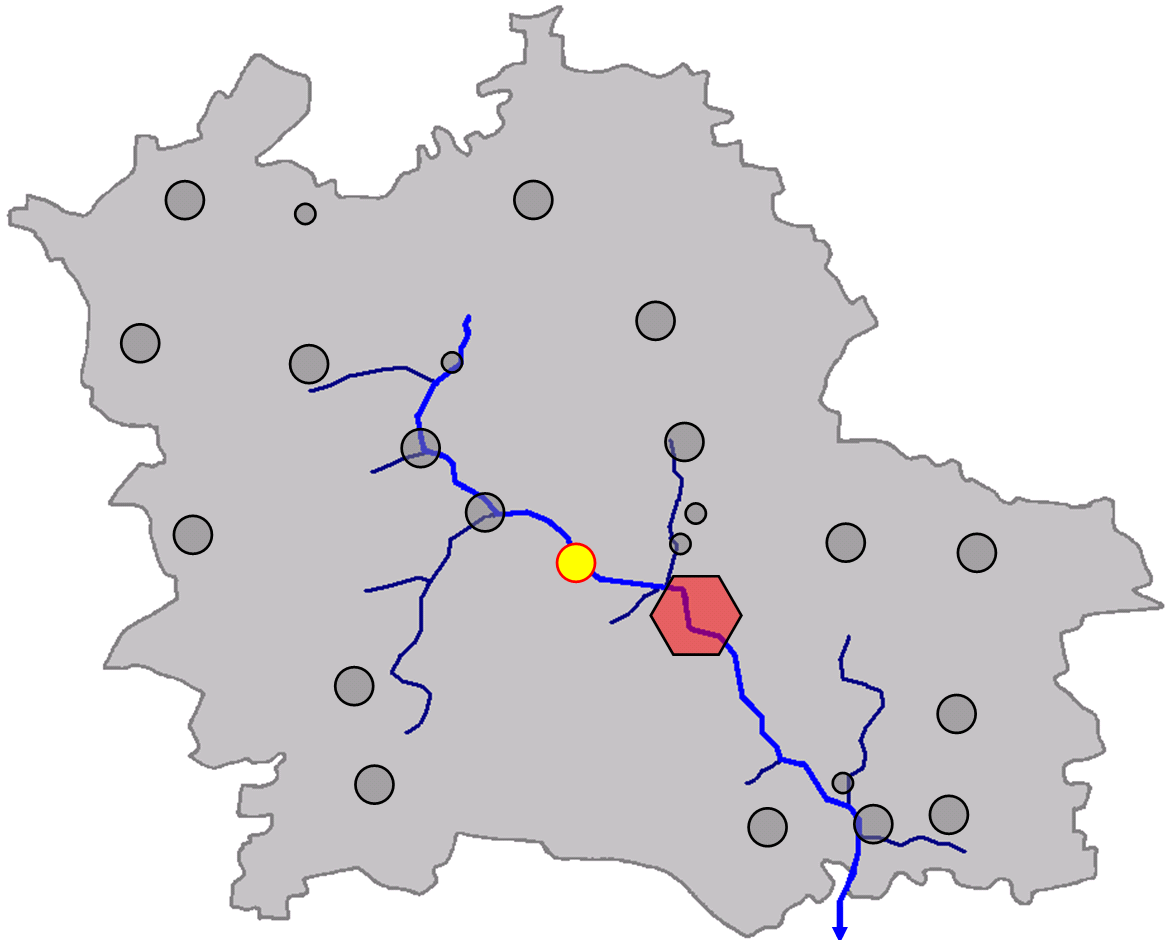
- Coordinates: 49°52′10.16″N 11°9′12.3″E
- Country: Germany

Population
  - Estimate (December 2015): 110

Zoggendorf is a constituent community of Heiligenstadt in Oberfranken, located in the state of Bavaria, Germany. It has a population of 110 inhabitants.

== Location ==
Zoggendorf is situated in Bavaria, Germany.

== History ==
The first mention of Zoggendorf dates back to 1163. The first confirmed certification was in 1371. On January 1, 1971, Zoggendorf became part of the market of Heiligenstadt.

A topographic description from 1752 reads: "Zoggendorf, a small village with 16 households, is located on the Leinleiter between Burggrub and Heiligenstadt. In this village, Baron von Stauffenberg of Burggrub holds various rights including village and community authority, tithe, hunting, and water rights, while the high court authority is held by the Hochstift (Prince-Bishopric) administered by the Office of Ebermannstadt."

The description also notes that:

- Two residents were subject to the Hochstift at the Ebermannstadt treasury office.
- Four residents belonged to the Princely House of Brandenburg-Culmbach, at the Office of Streitberg.
- Two residents were under the authority of the Count von Giech at Schloss Wiesentfels.
- Eight residents were under Baron von Stauffenberg at Schloss Burggrub, which was part of the Ritterkanton Gebürg.
- The community had fishing rights, adhered to the Evangelical religion, and was part of the parish of Heiligenstadt. Historically, Zoggendorf belonged to the von Streitberg family until their extinction, which led to its division.

== Name ==
The village was likely named by its first inhabitants. Over the centuries, the name evolved in both spelling and pronunciation to become Zoggendorf.
