= Schloss Greifenstein =

Castle in Bavaria, Germany

Coordinates: 49°52′27″N 11°10′20″E

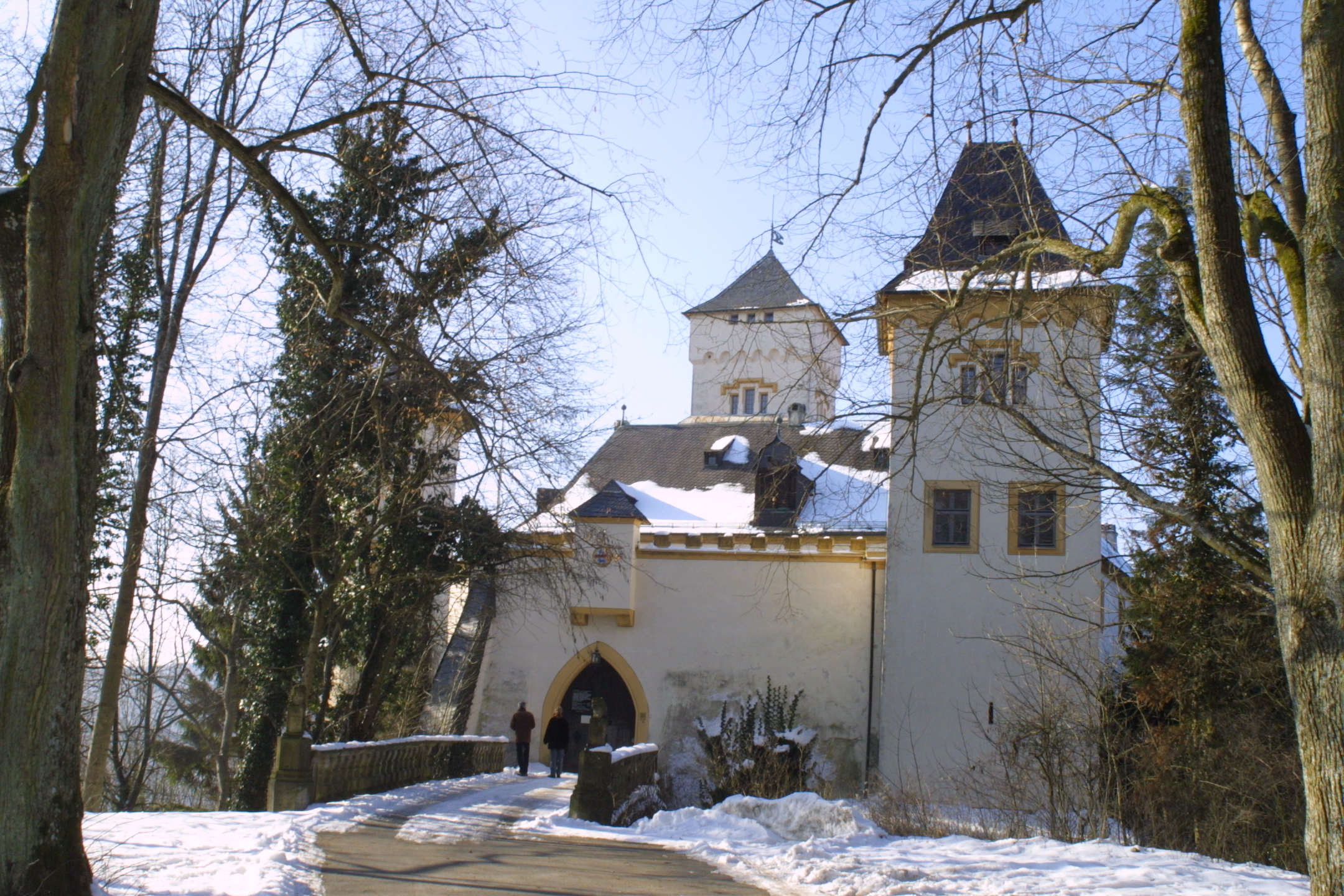
Entrance to Schloss Greifenstein

Schloss Greifenstein is a castle in the mountainous Fraconian Switzerland (Fränkische Schweiz) region of Upper Franconia, Germany. Since 1691 Greifenstein, the "stone stronghold" of Heiligenstadt round its walls, is the seat of the noble Schenk von Stauffenberg family. Greifenstein is a prominent feature of the modern tourist itinerary called the Burgenstraße (Castle Road).

The Gothic castle that was first noted in 1172 was ruined and pillaged during the Peasants' war of 1524-1525 and was subsequently rebuilt. Then Marquard Sebastian von Schenk von Stauffenberg, Prince-Bishop of Bamberg, took possession and rebuilt Greifenstein in Baroque style from 1691 to 1693, under the direction of the Bavarian architect Leonhard Dientzenhofer; consequently, as a seat of the bishop it is sometimes called Greifenstein Palais, though the aofficial bishop's palace stood (and still stands) in Bamberg. The Prince-Bishop inscribed over his gate a Latin motto taken from Luke 6:19: "for there went virtue out of him, and healed them all." The assemblage of arms and armor are outstanding.

A comprehensive restoration was carried out by Otto Philipp Schenk, Graf von Stauffenberg, in 1975–77.

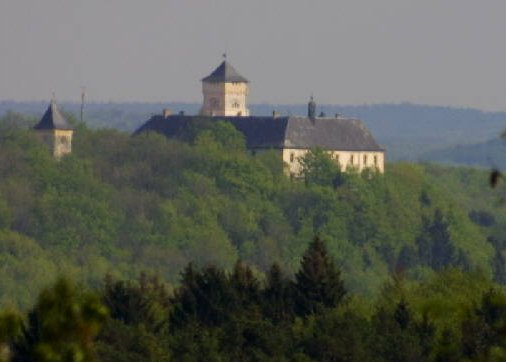
Greifenstein in its picturesque setting
