= Heiligenstadt in Oberfranken =

- Municipality
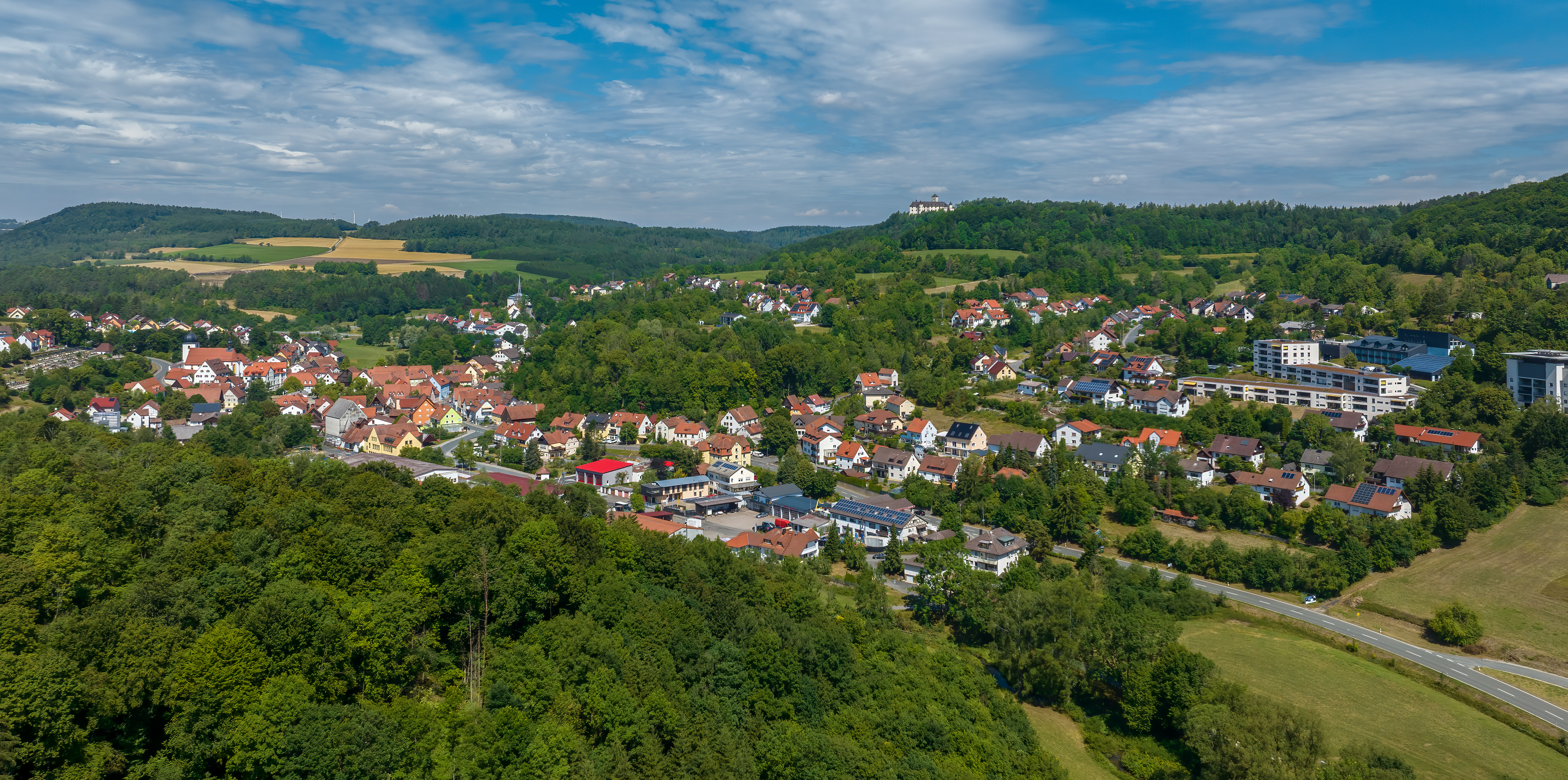
- Aerial view of Heiligenstadt

- Coat of arms

- Location of Heiligenstadt in Oberfranken within Bamberg district
- Interactive map of Heiligenstadt in Oberfranken
- Location within Germany Location within Bavaria
- Coordinates: 49°52′N 11°10′E
- Country: Germany
- State: Bavaria
- Admin. region: Oberfranken
- District: Bamberg

Government
  - Mayor (2020–26): Stefan Reichold (SPD)

Area
  - Total: 76.7 km^{2} (29.6 sq mi)
- Elevation: 304 m (997 ft)

Population (2025-12-31)
  - Total: 3,661
  - Density: 47.7/km^{2} (124/sq mi)
- Time zone: UTC+01:00 (CET)
  - Summer (DST): UTC+02:00 (CEST)
- Postal codes: 91332
- Dialling codes: 09198
- Vehicle registration: BA
- Website: www.markt-heiligenstadt.de

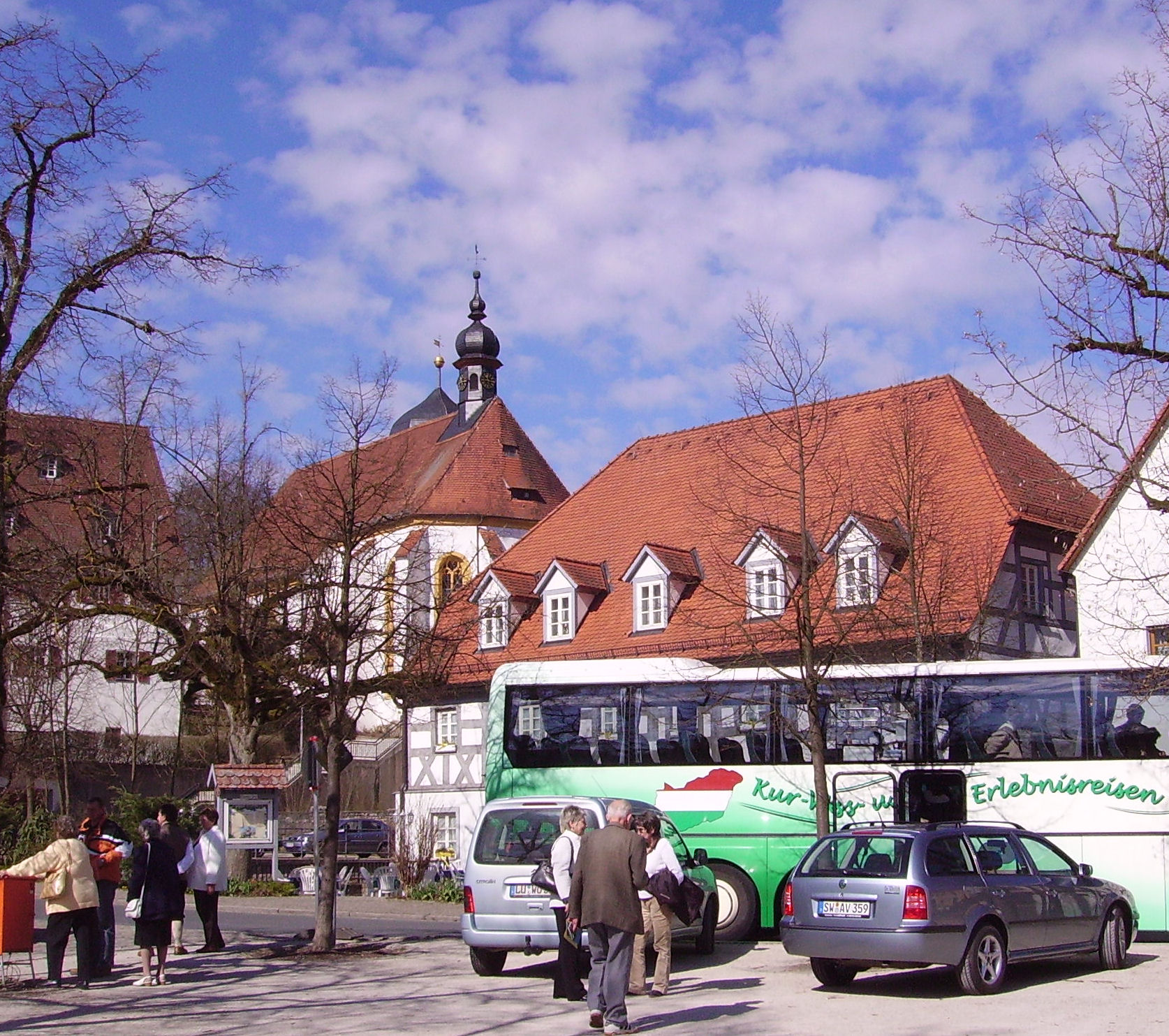
Easter in Heiligenstadt

Heiligenstadt in Oberfranken (German pronunciation: [ˈhaɪlɪɡn̩ˌʃtat ʔɪn ˈʔoːbɐˌfʁaŋkn̩], lit. 'Heiligenstadt in Upper Franconia'; officially: Heiligenstadt i. OFr.) is a community with market rights in the Upper Franconian district of Bamberg. The town clusters round the base of Schloss Greifenstein.

To further tourism the old school was converted into today's town hall, the historic marketplace was remodelled, and at Easter it is adorned with an Easter fountain. Furthermore, an old barn was converted into a community centre.

The community includes houses under memorial protection and a historic church.

Visitors are especially numerous at Easter when many come to see the Franconian Switzerland’s Easter fountains.

The Evangelical St.-Veit- und St.-Michaels-Kirche (church) goes back to a former tithe barn. The freestanding belltower stands on what is left of a former castle. Unusual for an Evangelical church is the elaborate Baroque painting on the wooden galleries and the panelled ceilings.

== Geography ==
Heiligenstadt lies in the Bamberg district’s southeastern corner. The 24 Gemeindeteile lie along the Leinleiter Valley and on the abutting Jura Plateau. Veilbronn lies 329 m above sea level. The greatest elevation is the Altenberg (mountain) behind Zoggendorf at 583 m above sea level. The villages on the heights from Volkmannsreuth to Teuchatz belong to the Lange Meile ("Long Mile"). The North Jura joins with the Seigelstein near Lindach. The mountain villages east of the Leinleiter are part of the Aufseßer Gebirge (mountain range).

Heiligenstadt, in the Naturpark Fränkische Schweiz-Veldensteiner Forst (nature park), is the most important place in the Leinleiter Valley.

=== Constituent communities ===
Heiligenstadt is a small centre with 24 constituent communities (Gemeindeteile). Within municipal limits is an area of 77 km^{2} making Heiligenstadt the district's third biggest community; however, it belongs to the more thinly populated areas. In all of Heiligenstadt's centres live roughly 3,500 inhabitants.

Brunn has an area of 5.57 km^{2}, lying on a plateau between Hohenpölz and Schloss Greifenstein.	111 inhabitants
Burggrub lies on the ridge of the Altenberg and below the 525-m high Eichenberg in the Leinleiter Valley, 378 m above sea level.	158 inhabitants
The hamlet of Geisdorf lies roughly 500 m above sea level on a terrace of the Jura.	34 inhabitants
Schloss Greifenstein lies 502 m above sea level and is the seat of the noble Stauffenberg family.	6 inhabitants
Heiligenstadt is the community's main and namesake centre, dwarfing all of its outlying centres with a population of 1,333.	1,422 inhabitants
The Heroldsmühle lies near the Leinleiter's source.	10 inhabitants
Herzogenreuth lies 566 m above sea level, making it the Bamberg district's highest village.	129 inhabitants
Hohenpölz with its 30-metre high church belltower can be seen from almost everywhere in the heights of the Franconian Jura. It has an area of 7.57 km^{2}.	143 inhabitants
Kalteneggolsfeld has an area of 4.18 km^{2} and an elevation of 520 m. It lies on the edge of the Lange Meile (“Long Mile”).	139 inhabitants
Leidingshof	35 inhabitants
Lindach was until administrative reform Bavaria's smallest community.	72 inhabitants
Not far from Neudorf begins the Wein Valley, which leads to Veilbronn.	47 inhabitants
The Neumühle lies on the Volletsbach 370 m above sea level below Schloss Greifenstein (castle) and is included in most depictions of the castle.	22 inhabitants
Oberleinleiter lies 386 m above sea level. The village's landmark is the 520-m high Kreuzsteinfelsen, from which there is a panorama over the countryside as far as the villages of the Bamberger Jura.	155 inhabitants
Oberngrub has an area of 3.7 km^{2}. It is part of the Lange Meile (“Long Mile”).	174 inhabitants
Reckendorf lies in a side valley of the Leinleiter running north–south, two kilometres north of Heiligenstadt.	70 inhabitants
Siegritz has an area of 9.24 km^{2}. It lies near the Wern Valley on the Alb plateau about 456 m above sea level in the Bamberg district's southeasternmost reaches.	174 inhabitants
Stücht once belonged to the Lords of Stauffenberg at Schloss Greifenstein.	68 inhabitants
Teuchatz lies in a small basin (545 m above sea level) on the edge of the western heights of the Franconian Jura.	212 inhabitants
Tiefenpölz has a noteworthy St. Martin's Parish Church that rises over the village.	140 inhabitants
Traindorf lies in the Leinleiter Valley hardly a kilometre south of Heiligenstadt.	144 inhabitants
Veilbronn lies in the Leinleiter Valley south of Heiligenstadt and is well known as a holiday village.	74 inhabitants
Volkmannsreuth lies on the plateau.	52 inhabitants
Zoggendorf lies in the Leinleiter Valley. Towering over it is the 585-m high Altenberg.	106 inhabitants

All population figures are as at 1 February 2021.

== History ==
Prehistoric finds establish that the market community's municipal area was already populated thousands of years ago, at least at times. However, permanent small communities only arose about the year 500 at the time of the Migration Period (or Völkerwanderung). Documentary mention, though, came only much later.

The community's villages arose about a thousand years ago. Heiligenstadt itself already existed before the Bishopric of Bamberg was founded in 1007.

In the Leinleiter Valley were lordly seats of the Knights of Streitberg. In 1525, the peasants revolted and inflicted heavy damage upon the castles. In 1541, the Emperor granted Heiligenstadt market privilege.

In 1580, the Reformation was introduced into Heiligenstadt and Unterleinleiter. In 1690, the Prince-Bishop of Bamberg, Marquard Sebastian Schenk von Stauffenberg inherited the knightly estates of Greifenstein and Burggrub together with patronage over Heiligenstadt. The Counts Schenk von Stauffenberg still live at Greifenstein Castle and the palatial estate of Burggrub today. The villages in the community's northern area grew out of the former Bamberg Ämter. Here there was no change in the prevailing religion.

Through the Reichsdeputationshauptschluss in 1803, the community passed to Bavaria.

In the course of administrative reform in Bavaria, the communities of Brunn, Burggrub, Hohenpölz, Oberleinleiter, Siegritz, Stücht, Traindorf and Zoggendorf joined the market community of Heiligenstadt.

=== Wars ===
==== Hussite storm (1430) ====
The first major war of which anything exact is known was the Hussite War in 1430. The Heiligenstadt parish chronicle reports that in 1429, single Bohemian cohorts destroyed parts of Heiligenstadt and the whole of Burggrub and Zoggendorf. By paying an immense sum of money, the Margrave Friedrich, who had been summoned for help, managed to get the Hussite leader Prokop to turn away. The money had to be made up through special taxes paid by the subjects.

==== German Peasants' War (1525) ====
During the German Peasants' War of 1525, peasants from the Bamberg area plundered and burnt the castle at Burggrub. A cohort from Ebermannstadt plundered the castle at Veilbronn. Once the revolt had been quelled by the Swabian League, five of the peasants’ leaders were beheaded at the market in Hollfeld.

==== Second Margrave War (1552–1554) ====
The Second Margrave War was set off in 1552 by the Margrave Albrecht Alcibiades of Brandenburg-Kulmbach. In April 1553, the Margrave's horsemen laid waste to the village of Herzogenreuth. Hohenpölz was supposed to pay protection money to receive a charter to avoid the worst.

==== Thirty Years' War (1618–1648) ====
The Thirty Years' War caused the most damage of all wars. On 10 September 1632, the Mistendorf clergyman reported the plunder of the villages of Teuchatz and Tiefenpölz, both served by him. The perpetrators, however, were not the Swedes, but Imperial troops who were fighting on the Catholic side. The Kastner (“bursary officer”) of the Streitburg wrote in 1633 to the Margrave in Kulmbach telling him that “the subjects had all their livestock and grain taken away and many were horridly murdered. In some villages more than half the subjects are said to have died wretchedly.” Farms were forsaken in Volkmannsreuth, Brunn, Oberleinleiter, Burggrub and Stücht. Meanwhile, times had become so uncertain that hardly any more written records were kept. Moreover, no-one knew anymore who was fighting for or against whom. On 12 June 1634, Weimar horsemen plundered the villages and took the farmers’ livestock away. An eyewitness wrote:

“On the same day we saw on the mountains near Hollfeld in three places villages burning; the flames reached up to the clouds.”

In connection with this, Heiligenstadt may also have been affected.

==== Seven Years' War 1756–1763 ====
The Seven Years' War between Prussia and Austria was about supremacy in Central Europe. The Prussians moved by way of Fürth towards the north and in the summer of 1757 they were quartered in Ebermannstadt, which they plundered before they then moved up the Leinleiter. On the way, they extorted all that there was to have: money, livestock, food. Under the soldiers’ march, Veilbronn and Traindorf both suffered. Barely a year later came the Prussians’ next invasion, and a year after that came a third. In November 1762, Prussian troops stayed in the area around Heiligenstadt for three weeks.

==== Napoleonic Wars (1796) ====
In the Napoleonic Wars, an army corps under General Jourdan on a retreat overran the Franconian Switzerland. French military police rode through the villages and extorted protection money from the peasants – sometimes many times in quick succession.

==== Franco-Prussian War (1870) ====
With the annexation of Alsace-Lorraine, many of those called up for military service were stationed at the Metz garrison, some of whom stayed for ever and took wives. Among these was Jean Puff from the Heroldsmühle.

==== First World War ====
Even though the First World War took place far from Heiligenstadt, the human losses were roughly as high as they had been in the Thirty Years' War.

==== Second World War ====
As the Second World War was drawing to an end, the villagers hid with their livestock while the village elders approached United States troops with a white flag to surrender their village. The Americans established a military government, ordering, on pain of death, the surrender of all firearms. Near Teuchatz, a bomb disposal site was set up, where Wehrmacht munitions were destroyed.

=== Chronology ===
1541 Market privileges
1580 Reformation in Heiligenstadt and Unterleinleiter
1803 Heiligenstadt passes to Bavaria
1915 Railway connection by way of Ebermannstadt to Forchheim
1968 Abandonment of railway
1971 Administrative reform

=== Community’s name ===
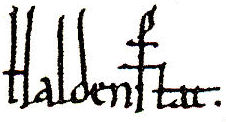
First documented form: “Haldenstat”

The placename Heiligenstadt has nothing to do with the German word heilig (“holy”). It is merely another example of how names can change over time. The community was first mentioned in 1365 as Haldenstat, meaning “town at the slope” (Halde is still a German word for “slope”).

In a report from the time of the Franconian Switzerland's discovery (that is, as a tour destination), Dr. Gottlieb Zimmermann describes in 1840 a hiking route along the Leinleiter wherein he shows by mentioning the community's old name that the name Heiligenstadt has nothing to do with Heiligen (“Holy Ones” or “Saints”), but rather with the word Halde:

„Heiligenstadt, auch das lutherische Hallstadt genannt, ist ein hübscher Marktflecken im Thale, wo die Reisenden mehrere und ziemlich gute Wirthshäuser finden.“

The community was called Lutherisches Hallstadt to distinguish it from Hallstadt near Bamberg, which was (and is) mostly Catholic.

== Religion ==
Within the market community's limits, Catholic and Evangelical villages lie in the area of the Archdiocese of Bamberg: In Leidingshof there is not a single Catholic, in the villages of the parish of Tiefenpölz, almost nobody is Evangelical. In the heart of the main community, mostly Lutherans live, whereas in the outlying newer developments, most people are Catholic. All together, the ratio between the two faiths stands at roughly 1:1.

=== Churches ===
==== Roman Catholic church ====
Heiligenstadt-Burggrub is a patronage parish with presentation rights of the Schenken von Stauffenberg, Greifenstein, and calls itself St. Paul Heiligenstadt-Burggrub.

==== Evangelical Lutheran church ====
The Evangelical Lutheran parish has its centre in the St.-Veit- und St.-Michaels-Kirche.

==== Free churches ====
Furthermore, there is in Heiligenstadt an Evangelical Free Church Congregation (Baptists). It has its seat in the family centre (sponsored by the Familienzentrum der Evangelisch-Freikirchlichen Gemeinden in Nordbayern e. V. )

=== Jews ===
Already by 1430 there were Jews from nearby towns doing trade with peasants in Heiligenstadt. In Heiligenstadt itself, it is believed there were no Jews at that time.

According to documents, in 1605 there were at least three Jewish families living in Heiligenstadt. In 1617, there were seven. According to a directory kept by a clergyman named Knab from Heiligenstadt, there were 1,758 souls in his parish all together, 239 of them Catholic and 58 Jewish.

In 1692, a shechita and slaughter order was in effect. In 1734, Jews were allowed to carry their books publicly, accompanied by musicians, into their synagogue.

Not seldom, the Jews’ business acumen led to envy. In 1699, peasants from the Scheßlitz area rose up together against the Jews. First, the Heiligenstadters wanted to stand against them. However, once they learnt that only Jews were to be harmed, they forsook their resistance. Some even took part in the ensuing pogrom. In 1716, the Jews requested lordly protection when news reached Heiligenstadt that a “young Christian girl” in Pretzfeld had been murdered, leading the Jews to fear that they would be the targets of a revenge campaign by those who suspected them.

The last relic of Jewish life is the Jewish cemetery on the Berg Kuhlich, mentioned as early as 1608. The last burial here took place about 1900. An unknown witness noted in the 1950s:

“Odd things happened at Jewish burials. The dead man or woman was driven to the graveyard on the Kuhlich by way of the Wischberg on a hay cart pulled by a horse. The grave was quickly dug beforehand. The dead were laid in a death shirt – already sewn while the dead were still alive – in a simple, unplaned coffin made without nails or screws by the local cabinetmaker, like a chest, from four boards. A little bag with coins went with the dead. Women, other than the nearest blood kin, had to stay in their dwellings. It was not allowed to give flowers, not even the smallest nosegay. With the customary head covering, the men laid the coffin in the grave, with the dead’s face towards the east. It all happened with great swiftness. Each one present threw three shovelfuls of earth into the grave. The Jewish teacher – in my youth it was the Jewish teacher from Aufseß – meanwhile read from the prayer book the Kadish, the prayer.”

== Politics ==
The community council is made up of 16 members, listed here by party or voter community affiliation, and also with the number of seats that each holds:

- CSU 5
- SPD-ÜW (Überparteiliche Wählergemeinschaft) 6
- BN (Bürgernähe) 4
- WZK (Wählergemeinschaft Zukunft) 1

=== Coat of arms ===
The community's arms show the Archangel Michael with golden wings, red cloak and blue robe, golden helmet with a red tuft of feathers on the head standing on a silver cloud and holding a blue flaming sword in his right hand and a green olive twig in his left.

When the outlying communities of Brunn, Burggrub, Hohenpölz, Oberleinleiter, Siegritz, Stücht, Traindorf and Zoggendorf were amalgamated with Heiligenstadt, the new, bigger community kept the old Heiligenstadt's coat of arms, which at arms revision in 1819 was held to be the “longest borne arms”. Older seals, however, have not come down to the present day.

The Archangel Michael is, along with Saint Vitus, the holy protector of the now Evangelical St.-Veit- und St.-Michaels-Kirche in Heiligenstadt.

== Economy and infrastructure ==
=== Economy ===
The industrialization arising in the surrounding towns led to the outflow of both small craftsmen and youth. Even the refugees driven from formerly German lands east of the Oder and Neiße after the Second World War did not decisively change this emigration pattern. Not all of them stayed for any length of time. It was only in the 1970s that an upswing was brought about when Mayor Daum did all that he could to make Heiligenstadt more attractive to those seeking work. To this end, jobs were created along with shopping facilities. The state furnished funds for this, making it possible to overhaul the community core.

=== Transport connections ===
==== Railway ====
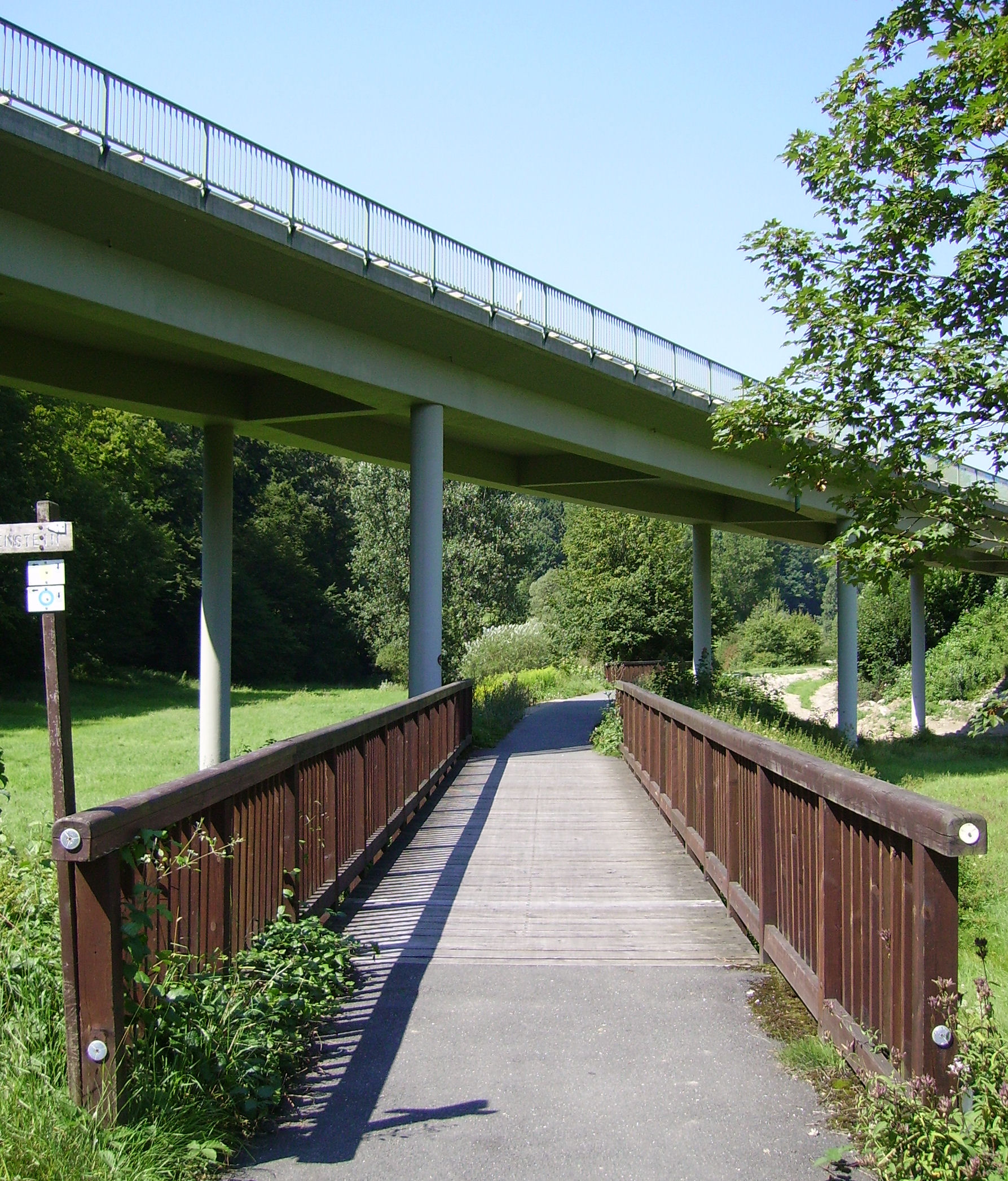
Bridge over the Leinleitertal and former railway line, now a cycle path

From 1915 to 1968, Heiligenstadt was the end of the Heiligenstadt–Ebermannstadt spur line, which also afforded a connection to Forchheim. When the time came to build it, there were still some who needed convincing of the project's wisdom. Put forth as arguments in its favour were the basalt mined on the Upper Leinleiter, iron ore finds near Königsfeld, the wood from the Stauffenberg and Aufseß forests, loading grain and livestock, and the looming tourism in the Franconian Switzerland.

For those whose lands abutted the projected right of way, building the railway meant a financial burden, for the railway required acquisition of lands needed not only for this right of way but also for other building works such as access ways. Even communities farther away from the railway were ready to throw their lot in with those that were nearer in the hope that there would one day be an extension to Hollfeld or Scheßlitz.

The people of Gasseldorf, on the other hand, caused the railway builders difficulties. They were unwilling to yield land for the project, making forcible expropriation measures necessary.

In June 1913, building work began. There was 117 000 m^{3} of earth to be moved, 11 bridges to be built, and the Leinleiter riverbed had to be shifted in five places, making plenty of work for more than 100 workers and many residents.

In 1915, the project could fulfil its purpose. On 4 October 1915, the Ebermannstadt-Heiligenstadt local railway went into service. The schoolteacher Hans Spörl wrote:

“A Heiligenstadter, engine driver Fritz Krasser, son of former mayor Friedrich Krasser in Heiligenstadt, who in his own time was already pushing for a railway to be built, had asked to be allowed to drive the first train into his hometown. His wish was granted.”

It goes on to say:

“Mayor Richter greeted the guests who had arrived, wished them a hearty welcome and expressed to everyone who had helped on this project which was so important for the community of Heiligenstadt the warmest thanks. In his further remarks he highlit the development of railway building from its beginnings through to today’s opening.
“With thanks to God he bound the wish for the new railway to Heiligenstadt to stay in God’s hand and for it to become a blessing to the community of Heiligenstadt. While the rejoicing schoolchildren were allowed to take free trips to Ebermannstadt and back again, the municipal representatives found themselves together with the guests and wellwishers at the Hösch Inn at a guests’ meal, where also in various addresses the importance of this festive day was brought to mind and an enthusiastic ‘Glück Auf!’ (a traditional miner’s expression of good luck de:Glück auf) was expressed for Heiligenstadt and the surrounding area. Heiligenstadt is proud of its railway!”

The pride was, however, short-lived, for in June 1960, passenger service ended on the line, and in 1968, goods services were also halted.

==== Roads ====
Already by 1912 there were signals to the effect that a motorized postal service from Bamberg to Heiligenstadt was being planned. In 1930, the postal bus was running “as demand required”. This mainly meant outings into the Franconian Switzerland. The post conducted its wanting service mostly under bad road conditions. The motorized postal line to Hollfeld was abandoned again in the autumn of 1931 because the abutting communities of Zoggendorf and Stücht were not using the service enough for it to be justifiable. After that, the coachman with his horse-drawn service ran once again.

Roads fit for motor vehicles within the community's limits came into being only in the 1930s through work done by the Reichsarbeitsdienst, mainly through their job creation schemes. In connection with this, the roads from Veilbronn to Siegritz and from Hohenpölz to Reckendorf were built.

The biggest postwar project was the building of the valley bridge in Veilbronn in the 1950s.

==== Post ====
The oldest note of the postal service in Heiligenstadt comes from the year 1733 when the prospective Catholic clergyman Josef Rösch in Bamberg stated that his father had for many years been the postmaster in Heiligenstadt. In 1853, the Briefniederlage (“letter repository”) was replaced with a Brief- und Fahrpostexpedition (“letter and coach service”). Whenever the postal agent changed, the station for the service also changed. In 1892, Heiligenstadt got a postal stop for the so-called Cariolpostlinie to Aufseß and Hollfeld. Another such postal line ran to the railway station in Ebermannstadt. In 1898 came the establishment of a planned postal agency, whose agents complained about the strenuous duty because the postal vehicles always came at night or very early in the morning, making it necessary for them to be on duty then.

Letter and parcel post was carried by motor vehicles. The postal delivery service was provided until the 1960s by postmen on foot or bicycle.

On 1 October 1874, Heiligenstadt got a Morse telegraph station, which was used until 1926. In 1907, a telephone exchange was opened. The first subscribers were the Hösch Inn and Schloss Greifenstein as well as the communities of Burggrub and Hohenpölz.
