= Castle Road =

Theme route in Germany and the Czech Republic

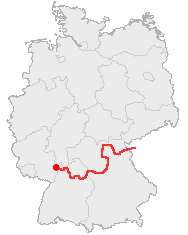
Map of the Castle Road

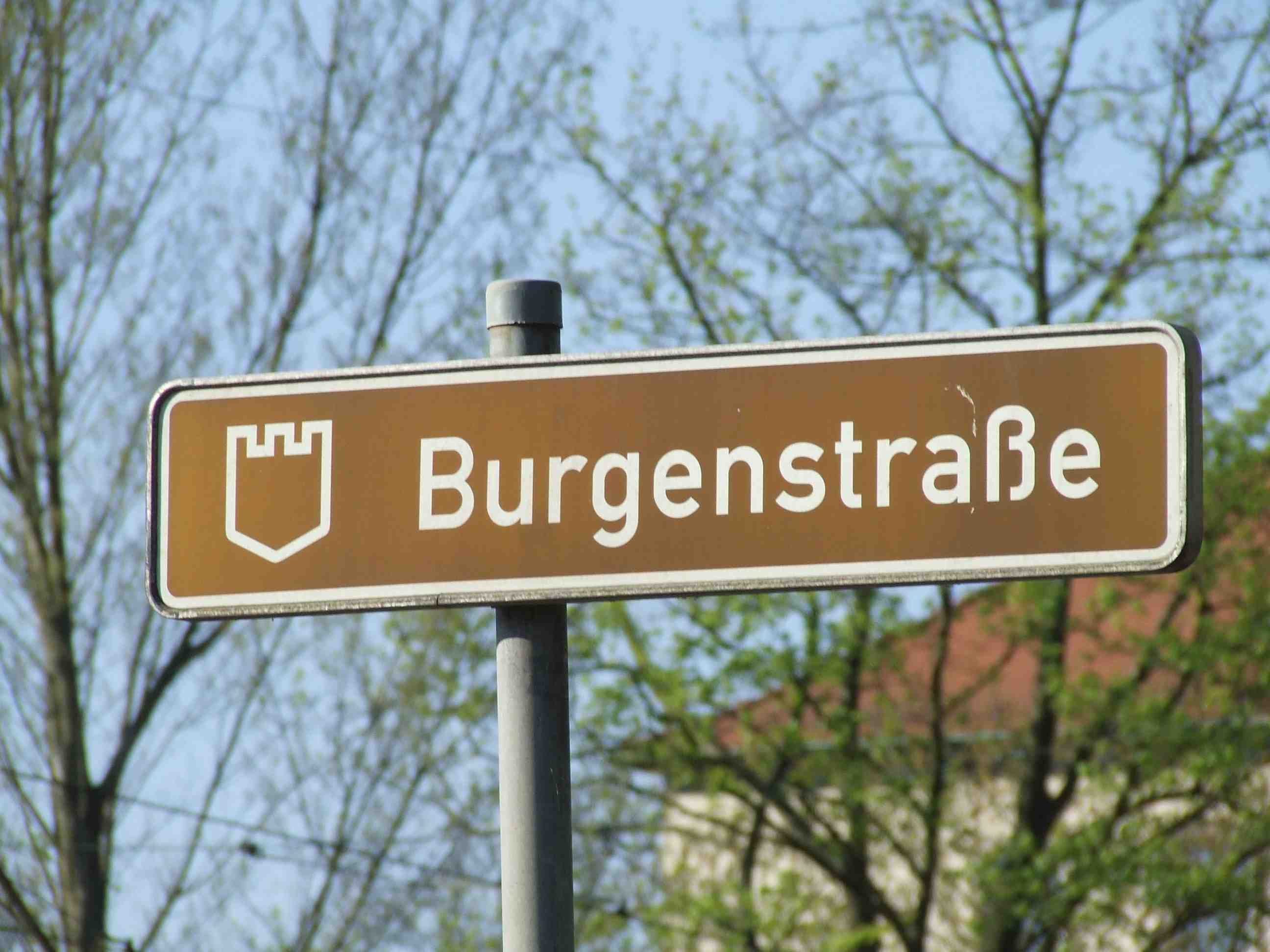
Route marker

The Castle Road (German: Burgenstraße) is a theme route in southern Germany (in Bavaria and Baden-Württemberg) and a small portion in the Czech Republic, between Mannheim and Prague.

It was established in 1954. In 1994 it was possible to extend it to Prague. It leads through the Neckar valley, the Hohenlohe Plateau, the Franconian Heights, Franconian Switzerland, the Fichtel Mountains and the Slavkov Forest. The Castle Road has a length of over 1,000 kilometres (600 mi).

== List of places ==
The Castle Road at the moment passes, from west to east, the following places and landmarks.

- D-Mannheim – Mannheim Palace
- D-Schwetzingen – Schwetzingen Castle
- D-Heidelberg – Heidelberg Castle, Old Inner City
- D-Neckargemünd – Bergfeste Dilsberg
- D-Neckarsteinach – Schadeck Castle, Hinterburg Castle, Mittelburg and Vorderburg
- D-Hirschhorn (Neckar) – Hirschhorn Castle
- D-Eberbach – Eberbach Castle
- D-Zwingenberg - Zwingenburg
- D-Neckargerach - Minneburg
- D-Binau - Dauchstein Castle
- D-Obrigheim – Neuburg Castle
- D-Mosbach – historical town centre
- D-Neckarzimmern – Hornberg Castle
- D-Haßmersheim-Neckarmühlbach – Guttenberg Castle
- D-Gundelsheim – Horneck Castle
- D-Bad Rappenau – Heinsheim Castle, Ehrenberg Castle, Rappenau Water Castle
- D-Bad Wimpfen – Kaiserpfalz Wimpfen
- D-Heilbronn – city itself
- D-Weinsberg – Weibertreu ruins
- D-Jagsthausen – Götzenburg (castle of Götz von Berlichingen)
- D-Öhringen – Öhringen Castle
- D-Neuenstein – Neuenstein Castle
- D-Waldenburg – Waldenburg Castle
- D-Schwäbisch Hall – Comburg
- D-Kirchberg an der Jagst – Kirchberg Castle
- D-Langenburg – Langenburg Castle
- D-Rothenburg ob der Tauber – Rothenburg ob der Tauber, medieval town
- D-Ansbach – Margravial Residence, Orangery and Hofgarten
- D-Romantic Franconia – Colmberg Castle, Veste Lichtenau, castle of the Teutonic Knights, Wolframs-Eschenbach
- D-Abenberg – Abenberg Castle
- D-Roth – Ratibor Castle
- D-Nürnberg – Nuremberg Castle
- D-Franconian Switzerland – Kaiserpfalz Forchheim, Ebermannstadt, Mark Wiesenttal, Egloffstein Castle, Gößweinstein Castle, Waischenfeld Castle, Aufsess Castle, Schloss Greifenstein
- D-Ahorntal - Rabenstein Castle
- D-Bamberg – Altenburg Castle, Bamberg, New Residence
- D-Rentweinsdorf - Schloss Rentweinsdorf
- D-Ebern - historic old town, Schloss Eyrichsdorf, Rotenhan Castle ruins
- D-Pfarrweisach - Lichtenstein Castle
- D-Maroldsweisach - Altenstein Castle
- D-Heldburg - Heldburg Fortress
- D-Coburg – Ehrenburg Palace, Veste Coburg, Callenberg Castle
- D-Lichtenfels – Lichtenfels Castle
- D-Kronach – Rosenberg Fortress
- D-Kulmbach – Plassenburg
- D-Bayreuth – New Palace Old Palace, Eremitage
- CZ-Cheb – Eger Castle
- CZ-Lázně Kynžvart – Königswart Castle (Lazne Kynzvart)
- CZ-Loket – Elbogen Castle (Hrad Loket)
- CZ-Bečov nad Teplou – Petschau Castle (Hrad a zámek Bečov)
- CZ-Teplá – Teplá Abbey
- CZ-Švihov – Svihov Castle (Vodní hrad Švihov)
- CZ-Nezvěstice – Nebilovy Castle (Zámek Nebílovy)
- CZ-Šťáhlavy – Kozel Castle (Zámek Kozel)
- CZ-Hořovice – Hořovice Castle
- CZ-Zdice – Žebrák Castle (Hrad Žebrák), Točník Castle (Hrad Točník)
- CZ-Křivoklát – Křivoklát Castle (Hrad Křivoklát)
- CZ-Karlštejn – Karlštejn Castle
- CZ-Prague – Prague Castle

== Cycleway ==
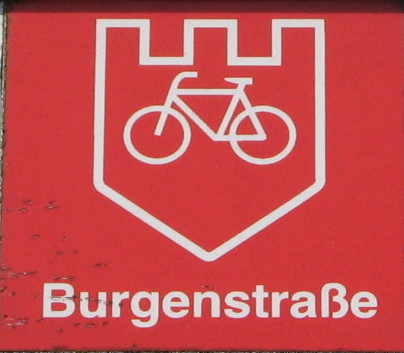
Sign Cycleway Burgenstraße

There also exists a Cycleway "Burgenstraßen-Radweg".

== Gallery ==
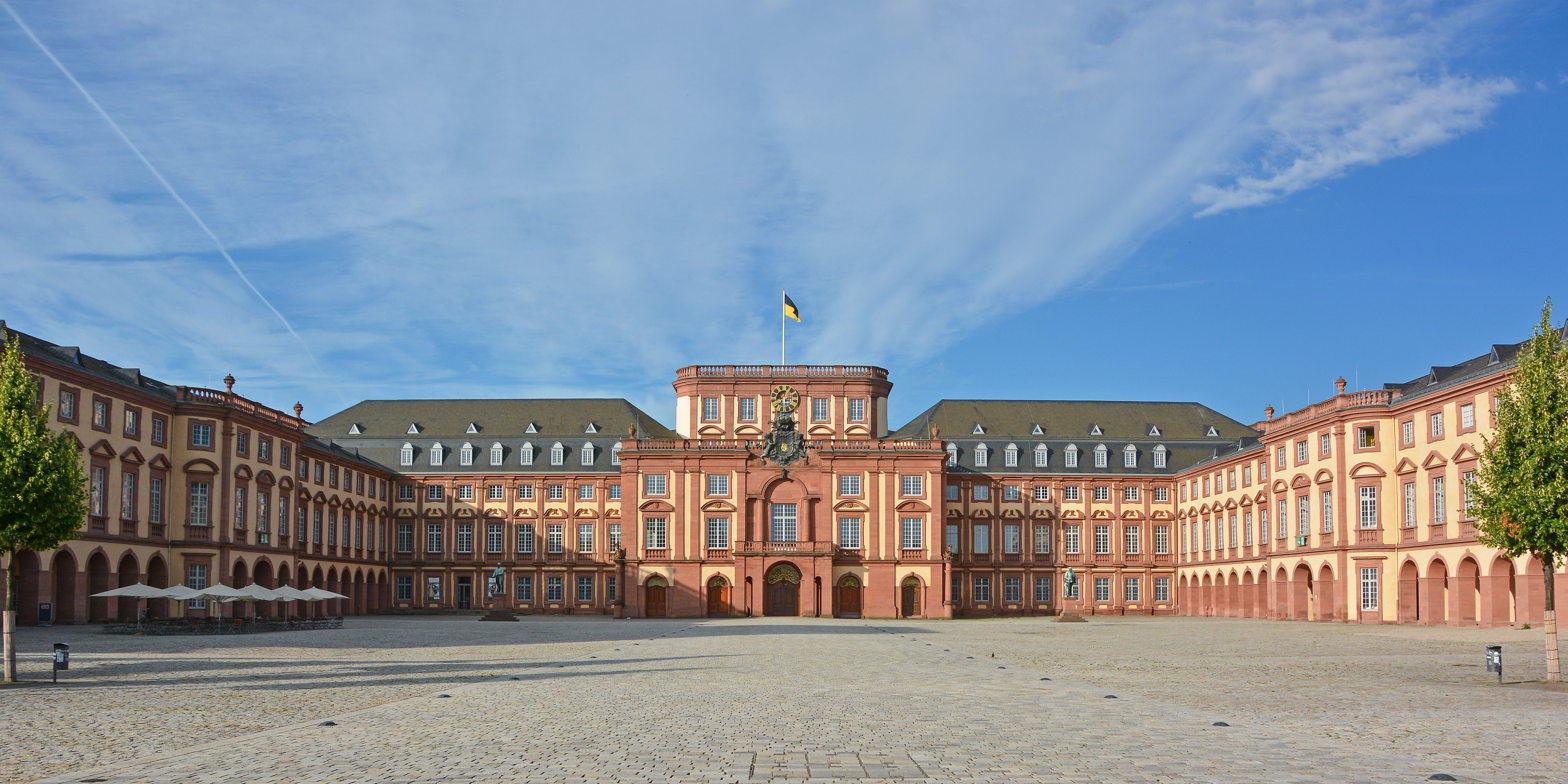
Mannheim Palace

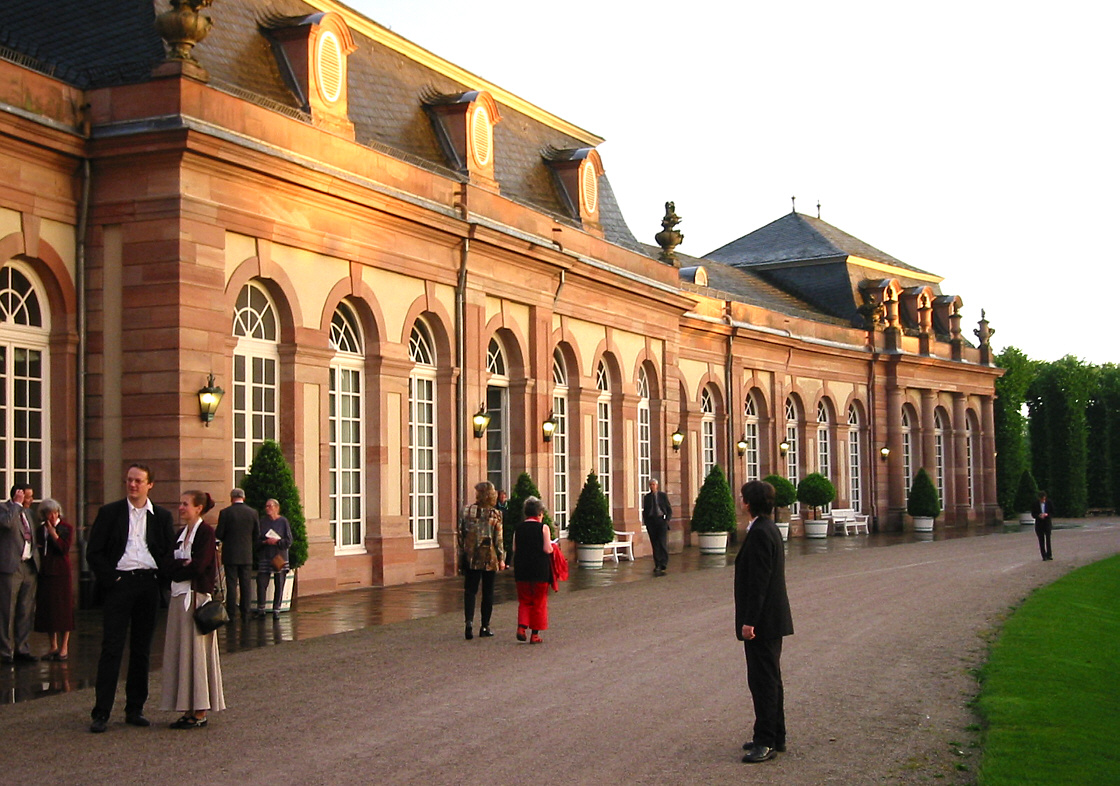
Schwetzingen

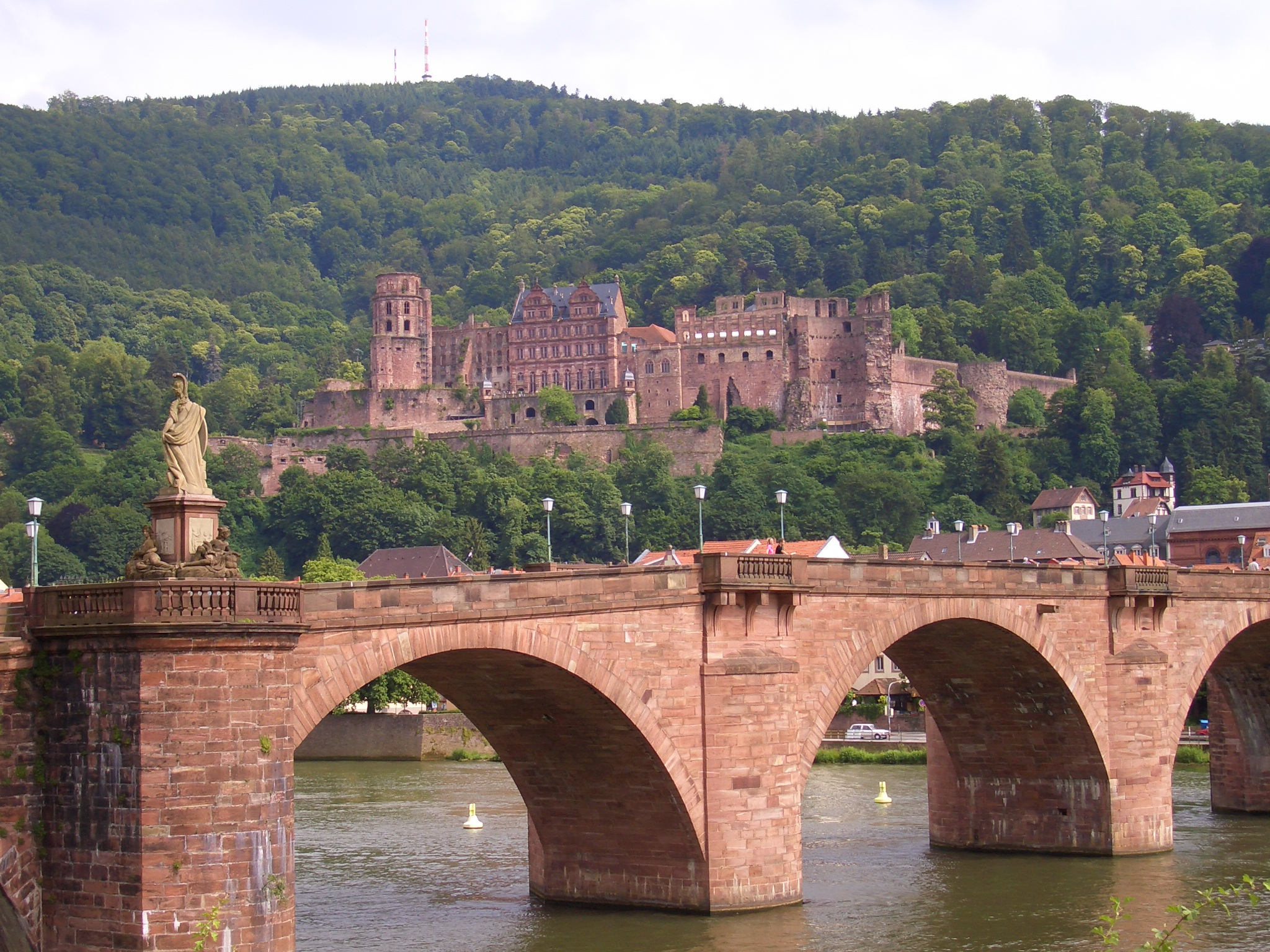
Heidelberg Castle

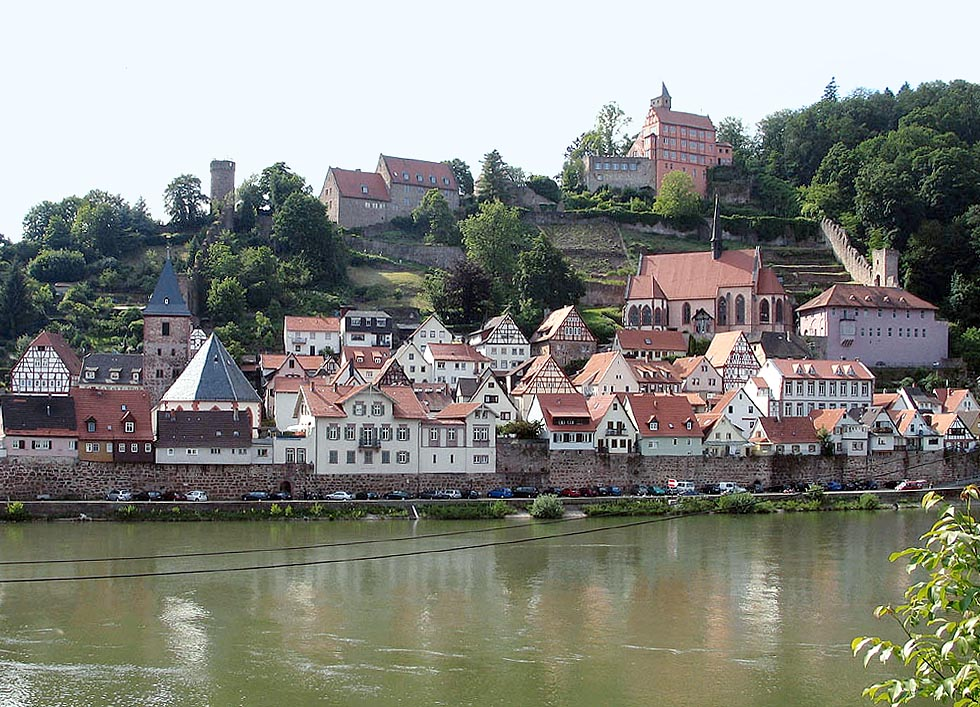
Hirschhorn

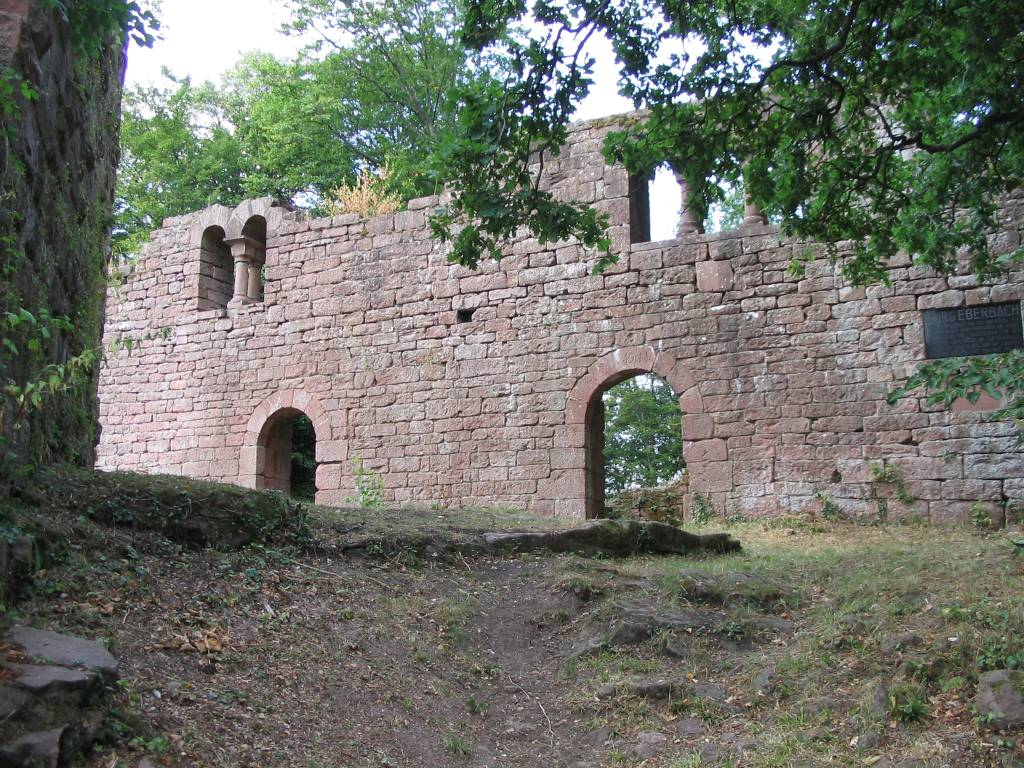
Eberbach Castle

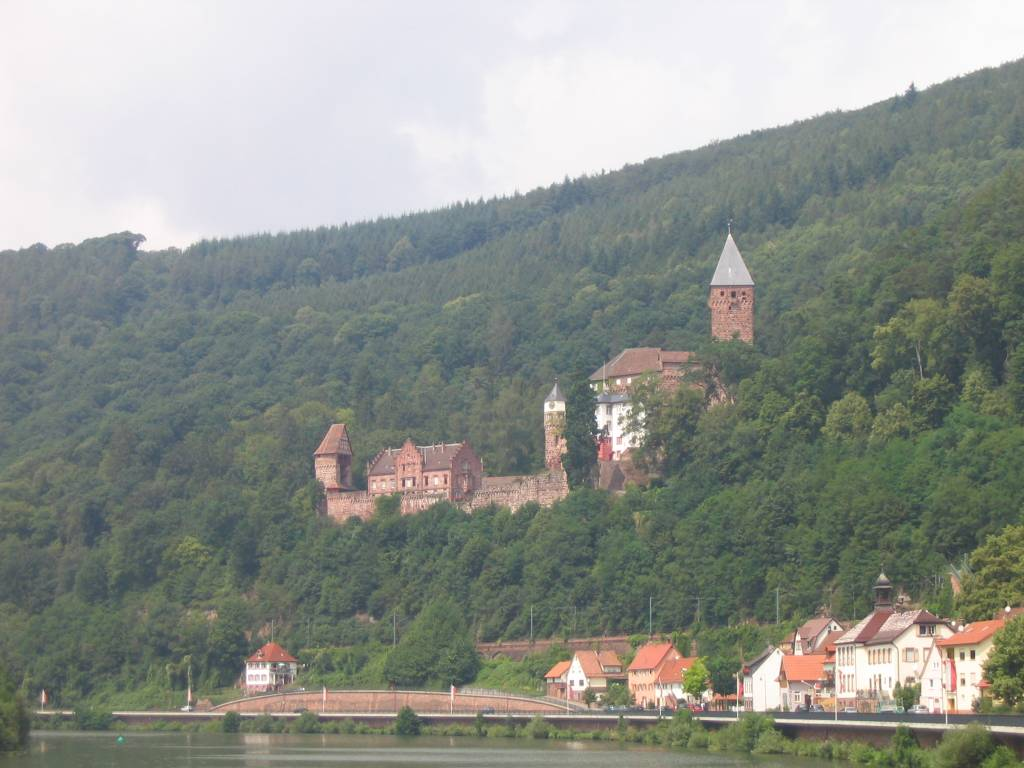
Zwingenburg

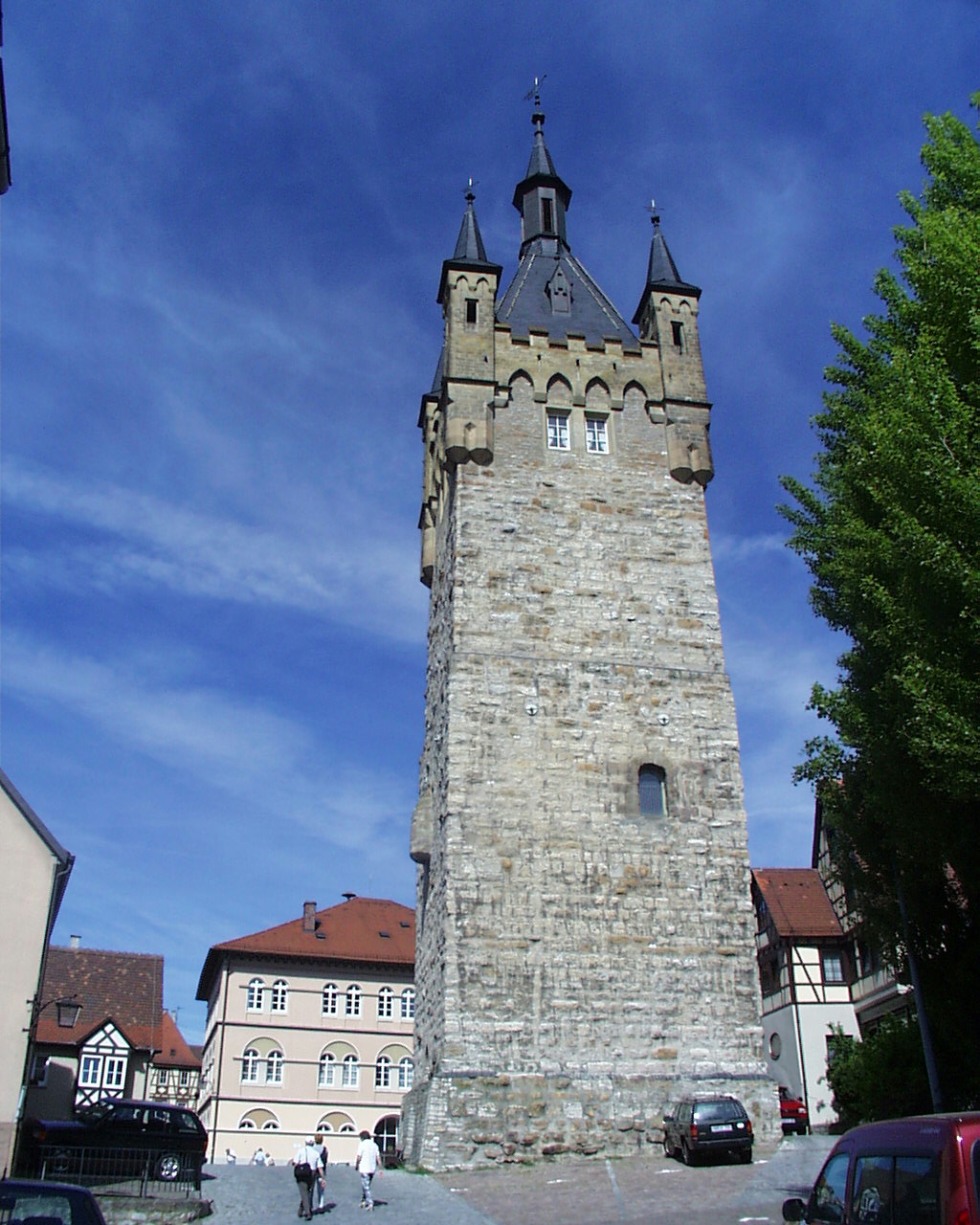
Bad Wimpfen

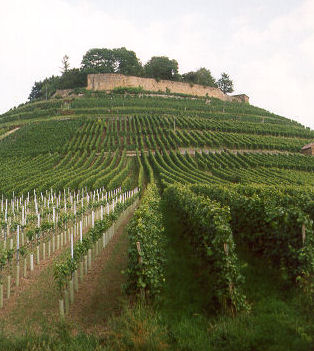
Weinsberg Castle

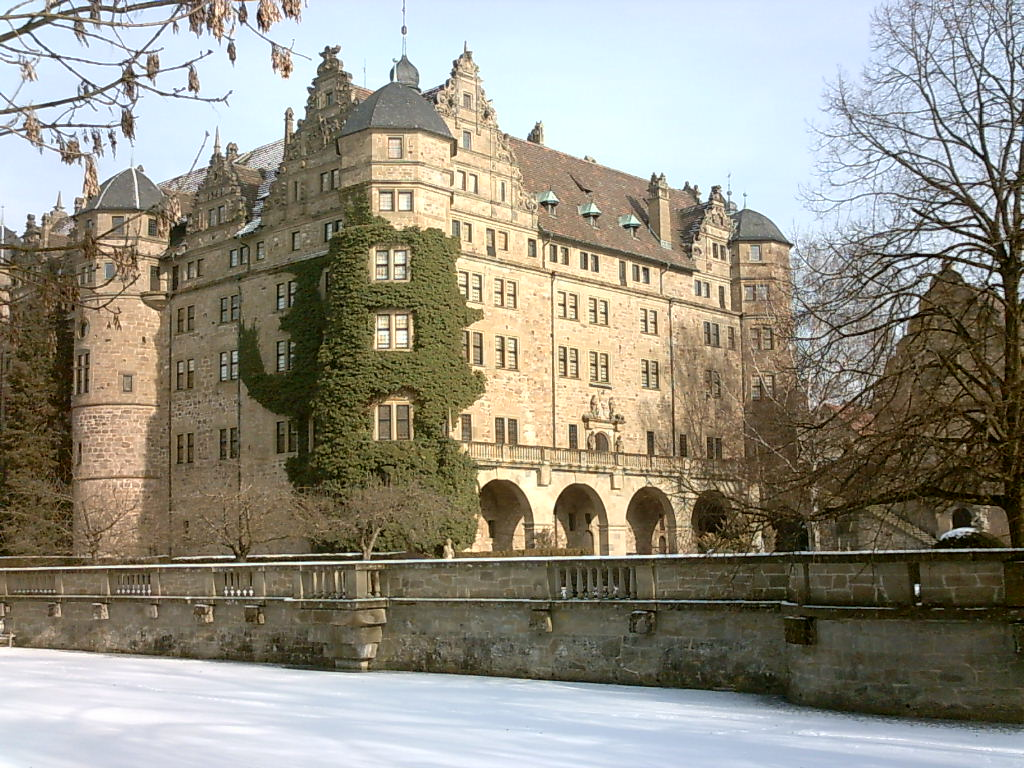
Neuenstein Castle

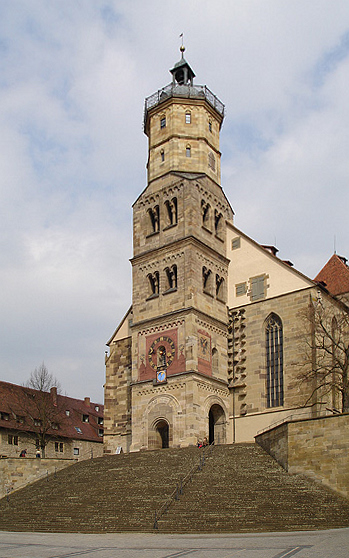
Schwäbisch Hall

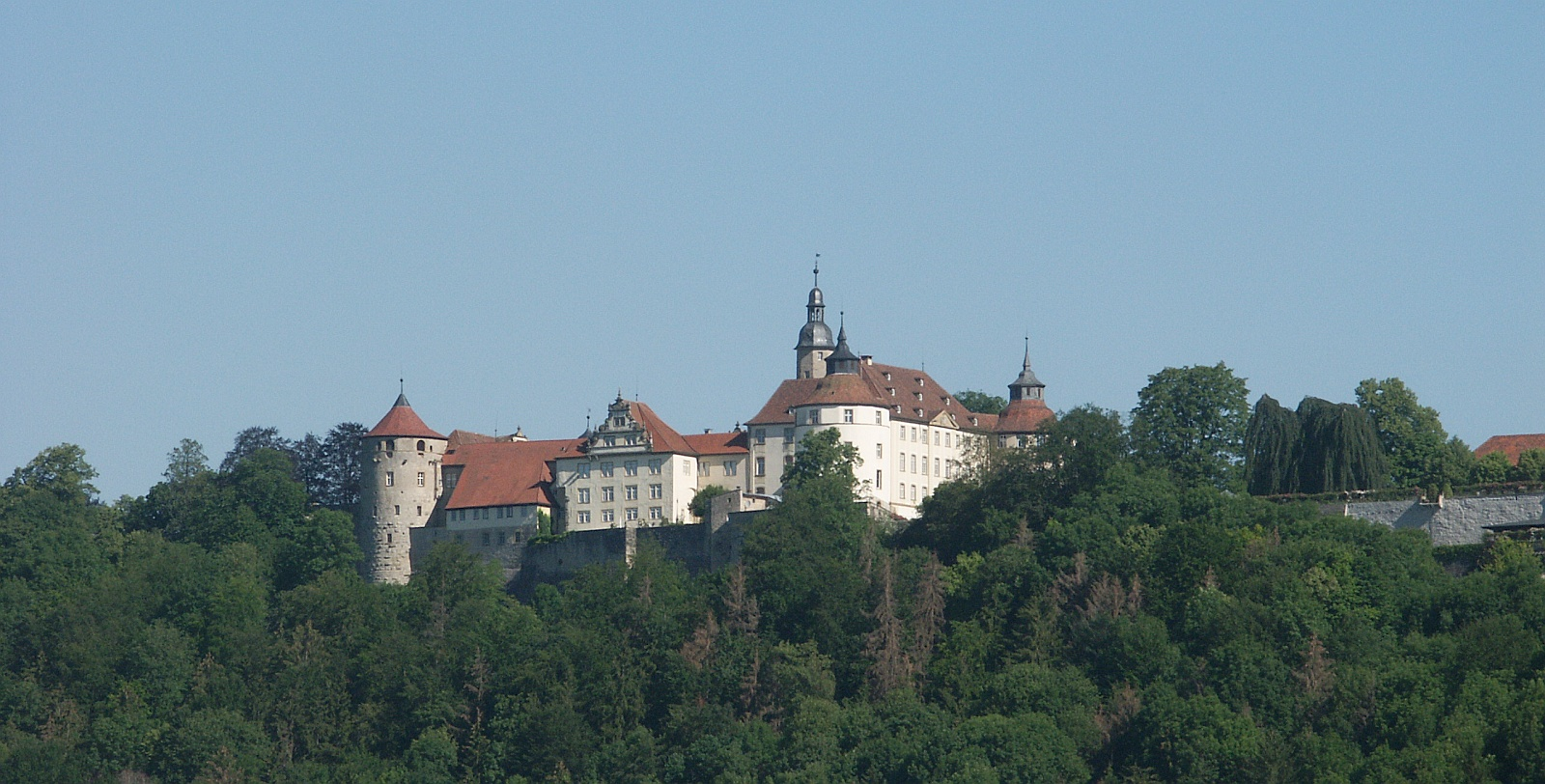
Langenburg Castle

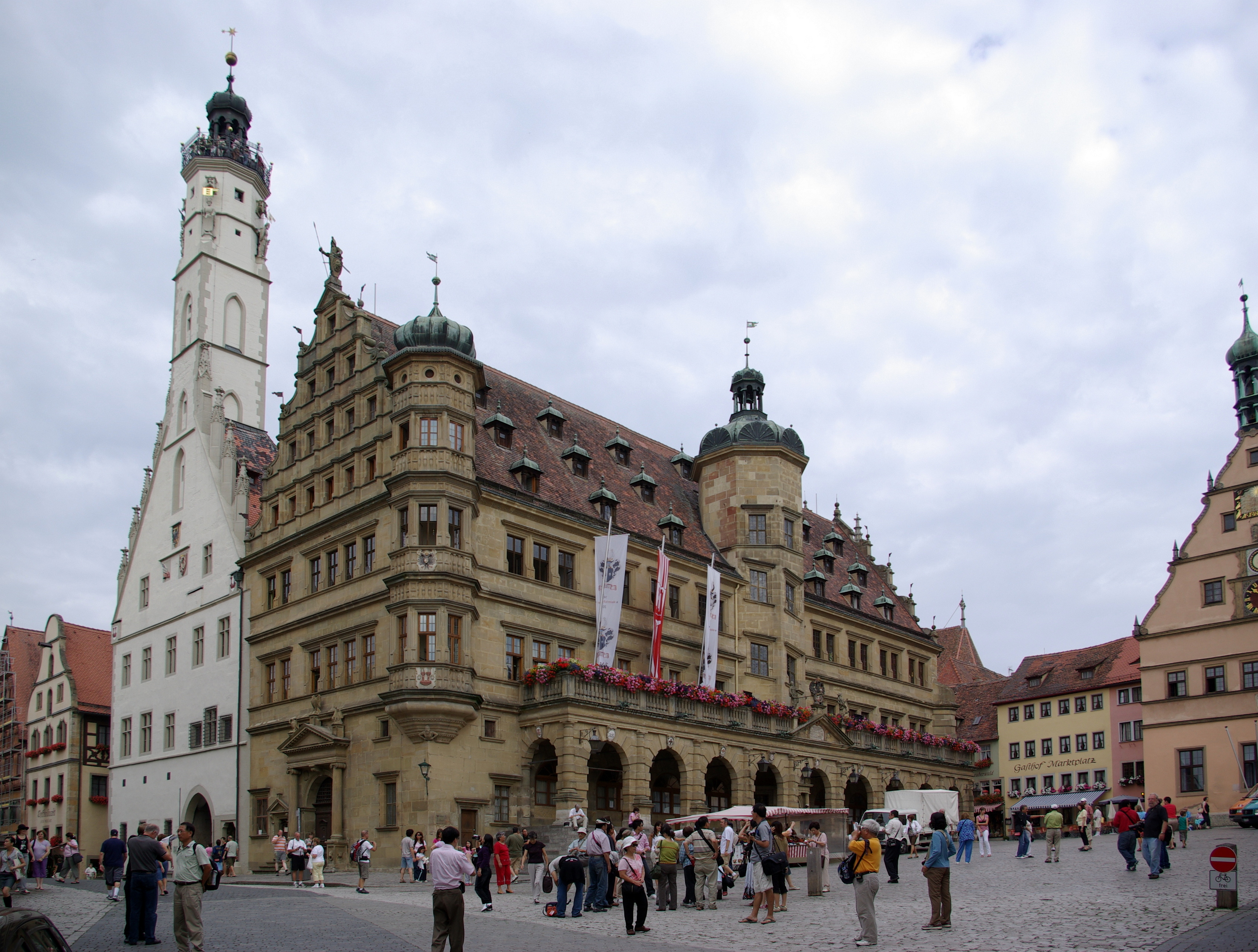
Rothenburg town hall

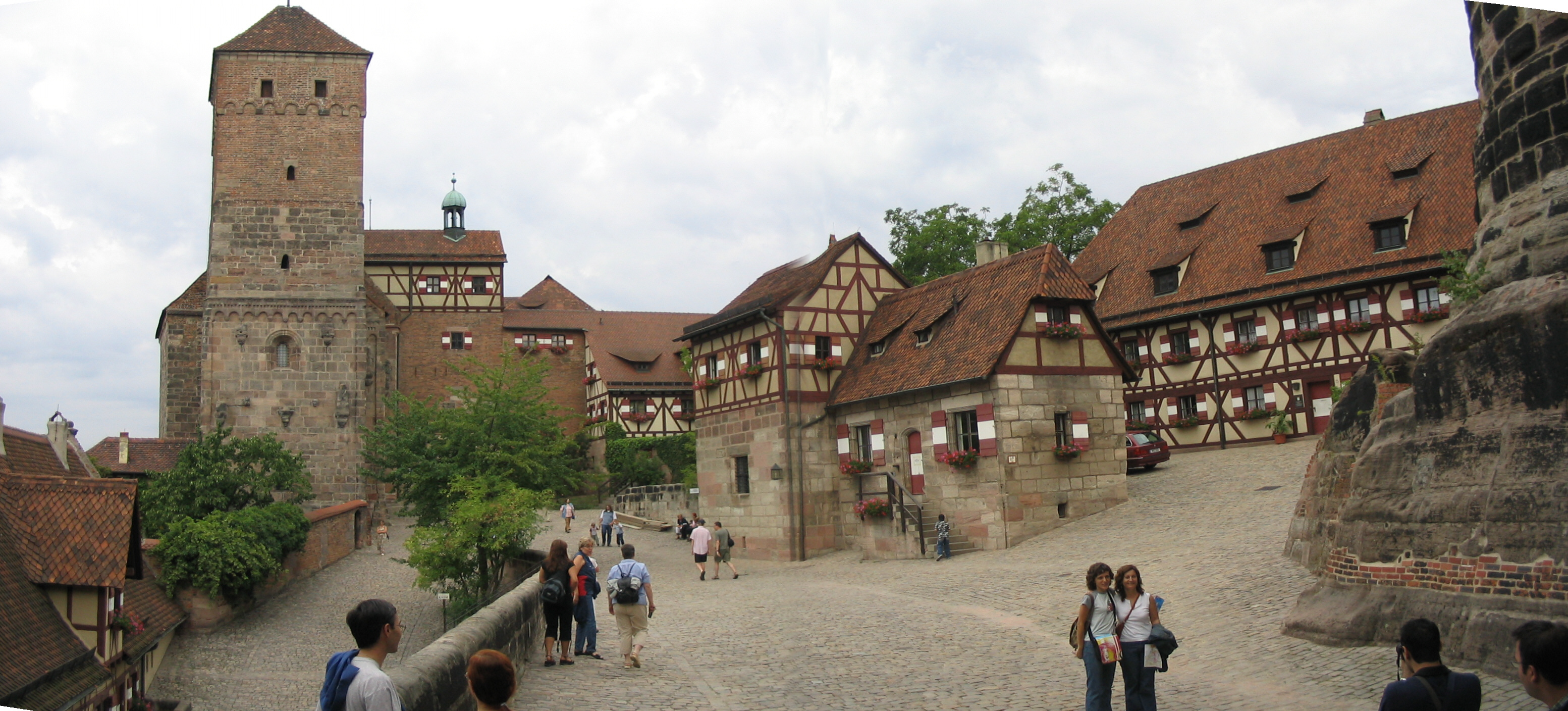
Nuremberg Castle

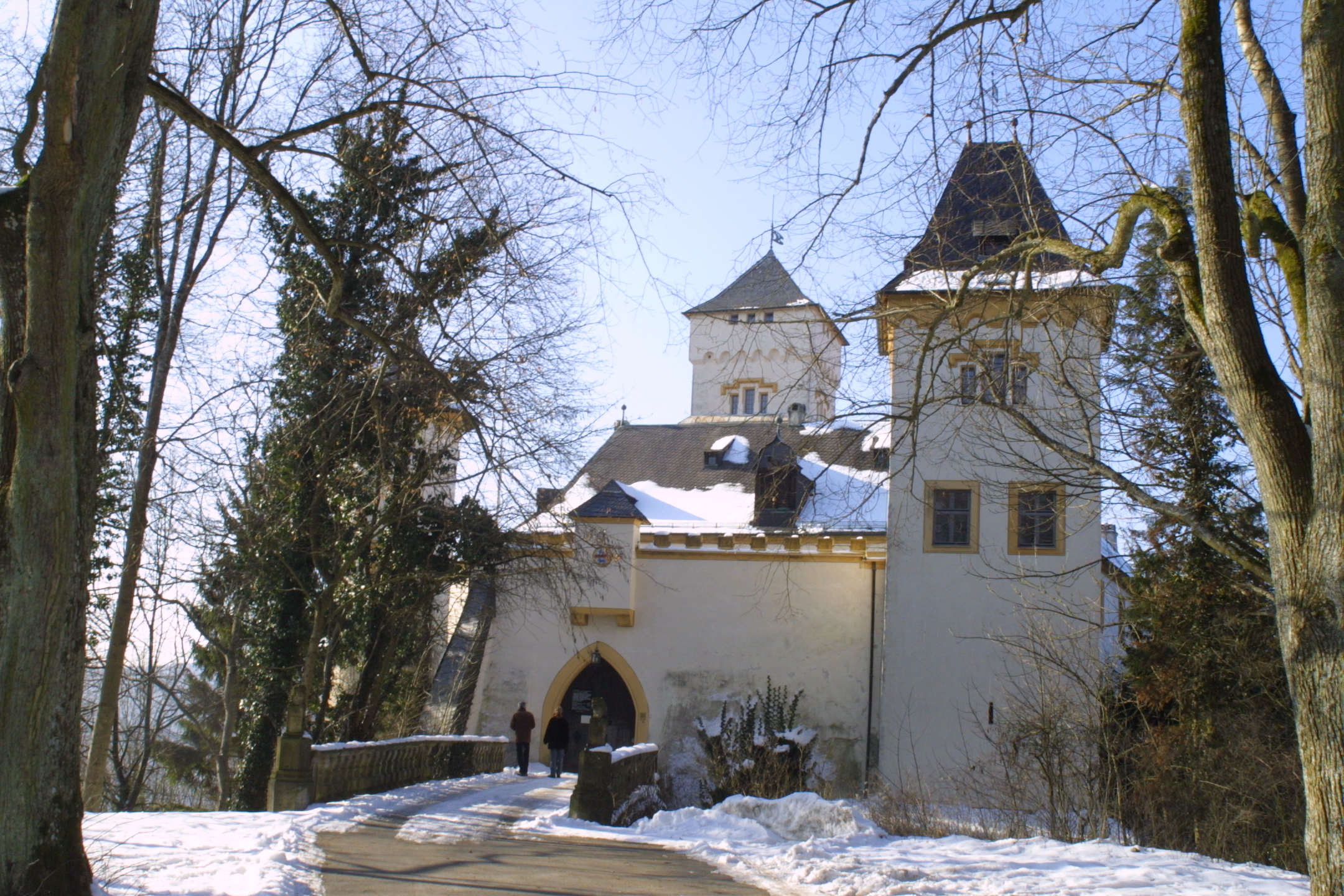
Greifenstein Castle

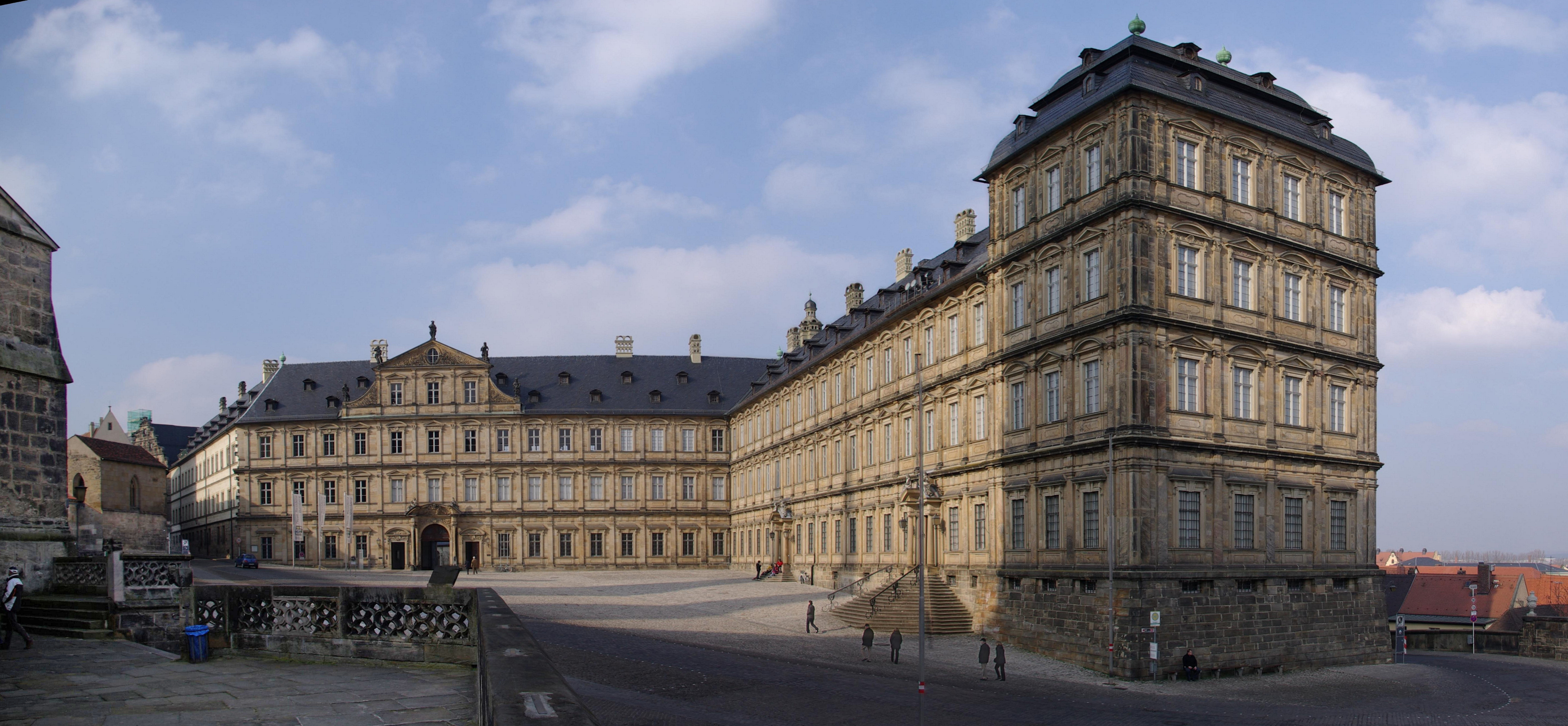
New Residence in Bamberg

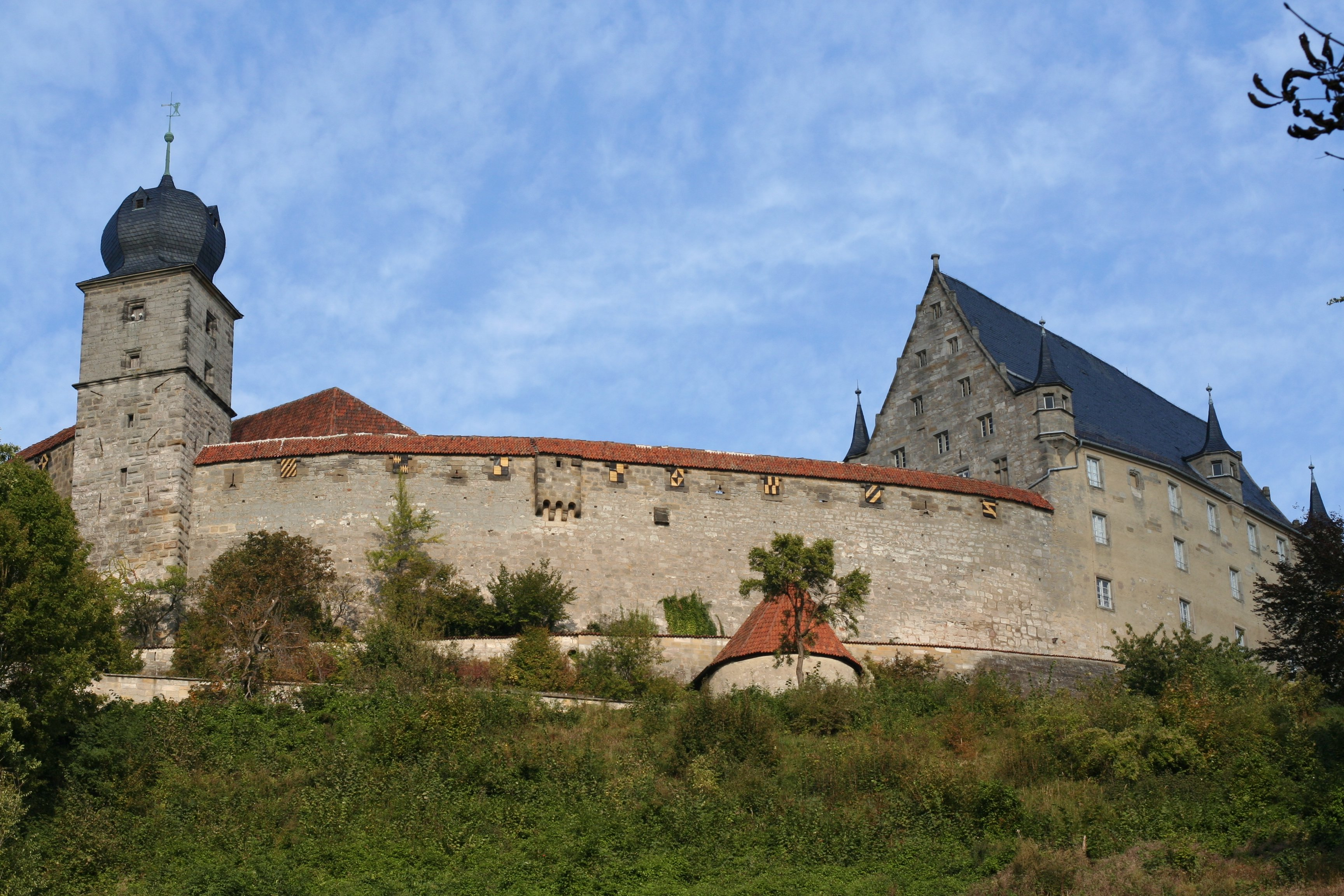
Veste Coburg

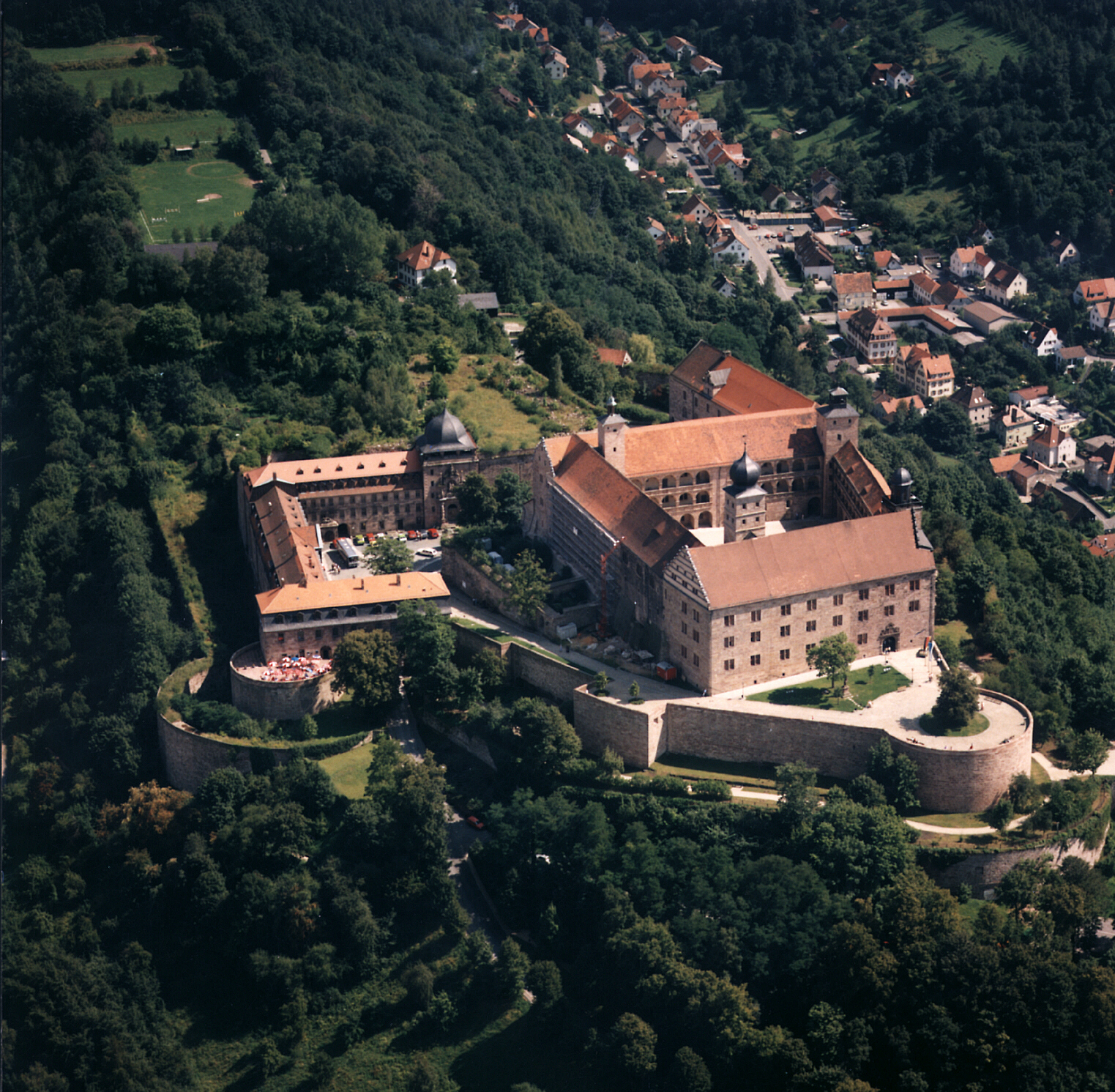
Plassenburg Castle

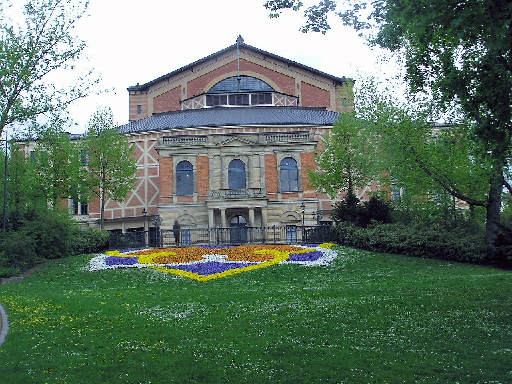
Festival Theater in Bayreuth

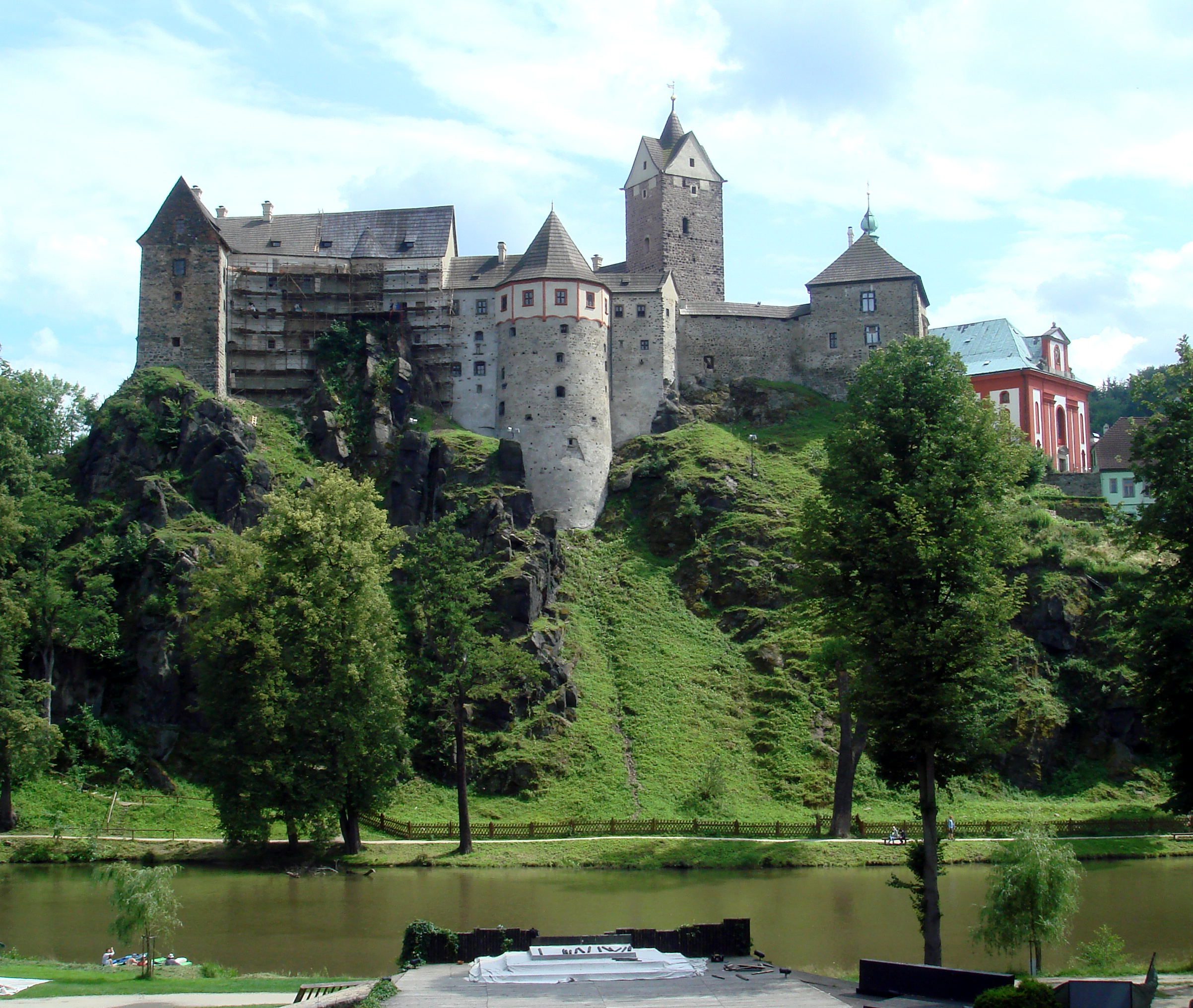
Loket

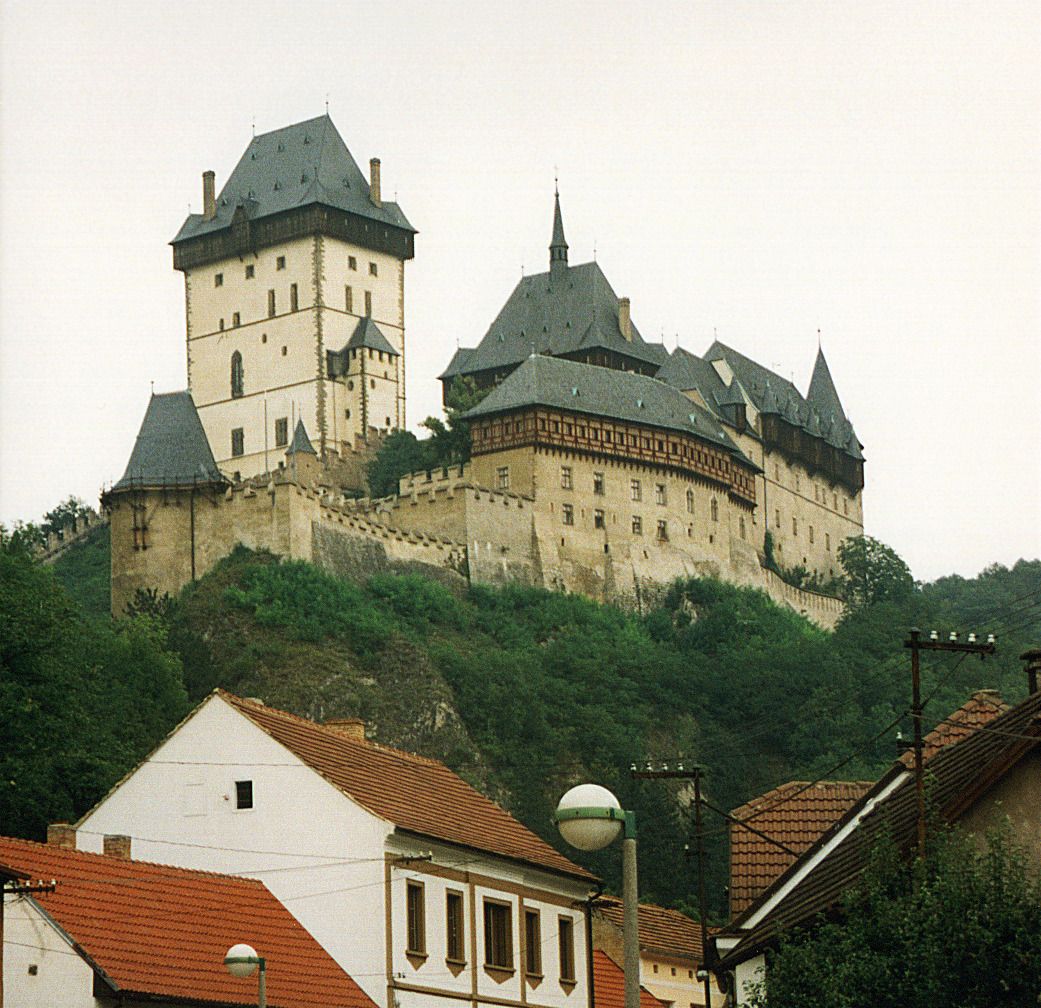
Karlštejn Castle

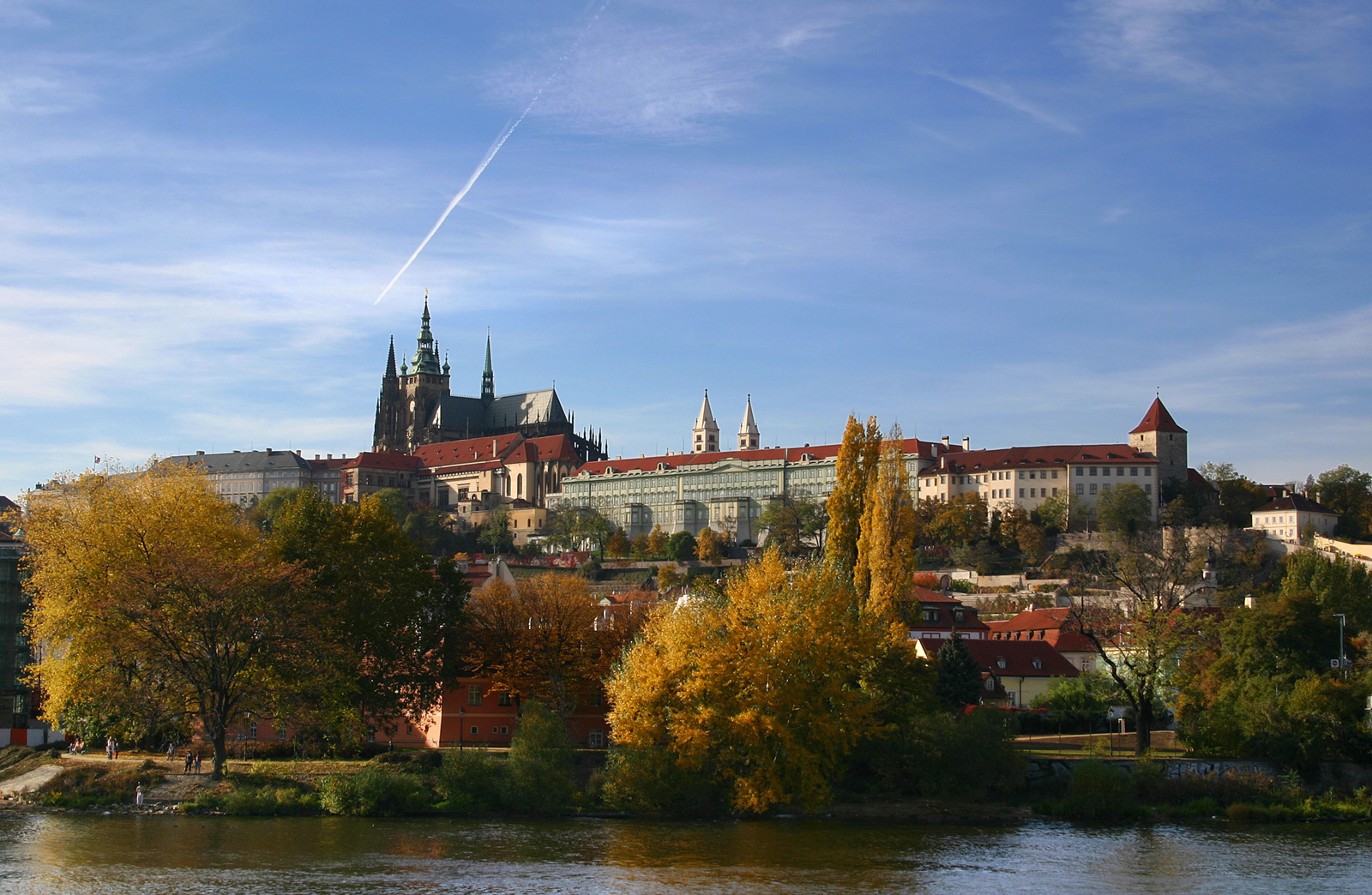
Prague

== Literature ==
- Arbeitsgemeinschaft "Die Burgenstraße": Burgenstraßen-Radwanderführer. Hrsg. Arbeitsgemeinschaft "Die Burgenstraße", Heilbronn. J. Fink-Kümmerly + Frey Verlag GmbH, Ostfildern
- Hans Konrad Schenk: Hohenlohe vom Reichsfürstentum zur Standesherrschaft. Swiridoff-Verlag Künzelsau, 2006. ISBN 3-89929-080-1
