= Koser =

Koser may refer to:

- Anja Koser (born 1970), German handball and football player
- Fatma Koşer Kaya (born 1968), Dutch lawyer and politician of Turkish origin
- Ralf Koser (born 1973), German judoka
- several Yugoslavian sailplanes designed by Jaroslav Koser:
  - Koser-Hrovat KB-1 Triglav
  - Koser KB-3 Jadran
- Koserbach (other name Koser), a river of Bavaria, Germany, tributary of the Schorgast
  - Großer Koserbach, uppercourse name of the Koserbach
  - Kleiner Koserbach, tributary of the Koserbach
