= Steinach =

Steinach may refer to:

== Places and rivers ==
- in Germany:
  - Steinach, Baden-Württemberg, a municipality in the Ortenaukreis district
  - Steinach, Bavaria, a municipality in the Straubing-Bogen district
  - Steinach, Thuringia, a town in the Sonneberg district
  - Steinach (Rodach), a river of Thuringia and Bavaria, tributary of the Rodach, itself a tributary of the Main
  - Untere Steinach, a river in Bavaria, tributary of the Schorgast
  - Warme Steinach a river of Bavaria, tributary of the Red Main
  - Steinach (Neckarsteinach), a river of Hesse and Baden-Württemberg, a tributary of the Neckar in Neckarsteinach
  - Steinach (Nürtingen), a river of Baden-Württemberg, a tributary of the Neckar in Nürtingen
- in Austria:
  - Steinach am Brenner, a municipality in Tyrol
- in Switzerland:
  - Steinach, St. Gallen, a municipality in the canton of St. Gallen
  - Steinach (Lake Constance), a tributary of Lake Constance

== People ==
- Eugen Steinach (1861-1944), leading Austrian physiologist and pioneer in endocrinology
- Bligger von Steinach, the name of a series of feudal lords of Steinach, today Neckarsteinach in Hesse, Germany

== Other ==
- Steinach (b Rothenburg o. d. Tauber) station, a railway station in Bavaria, Germany
- SV 08 Steinach, a German association football club that plays in Steinach, Thuringia
