= Hohe Warte (ridge) =

- Location within Bavaria

Highest point
- Elevation: 493 m above sea level (1,617 ft)
- Coordinates: 49°58′06″N 11°34′30″E

Geography
- Location: Land: Bavaria/Bayreuth district Parishes: Bindlach/Heinersreuth/Bayreuth
- Parent range: Fichtel Mountains

Geology
- Mountain type: Mountain chain
- Rock type: Bunter Sandstone

The Hohe Warte (318–493 m above NN) is a largely forested upland with four striking hills on the southwestern fringe of the Fichtel Mountains located in northern Bavaria, near Bayreuth. Its highest peak is the Hirschberg (493 m). About 60% of the ridge lies on the territory of the parish of Bindlach, the other 40% is divided between the town of Bayreuth and the parish of Heinersreuth. A number of lakes and streams have their origin in these hills and are an important source of drinking water for the surrounding settlements.

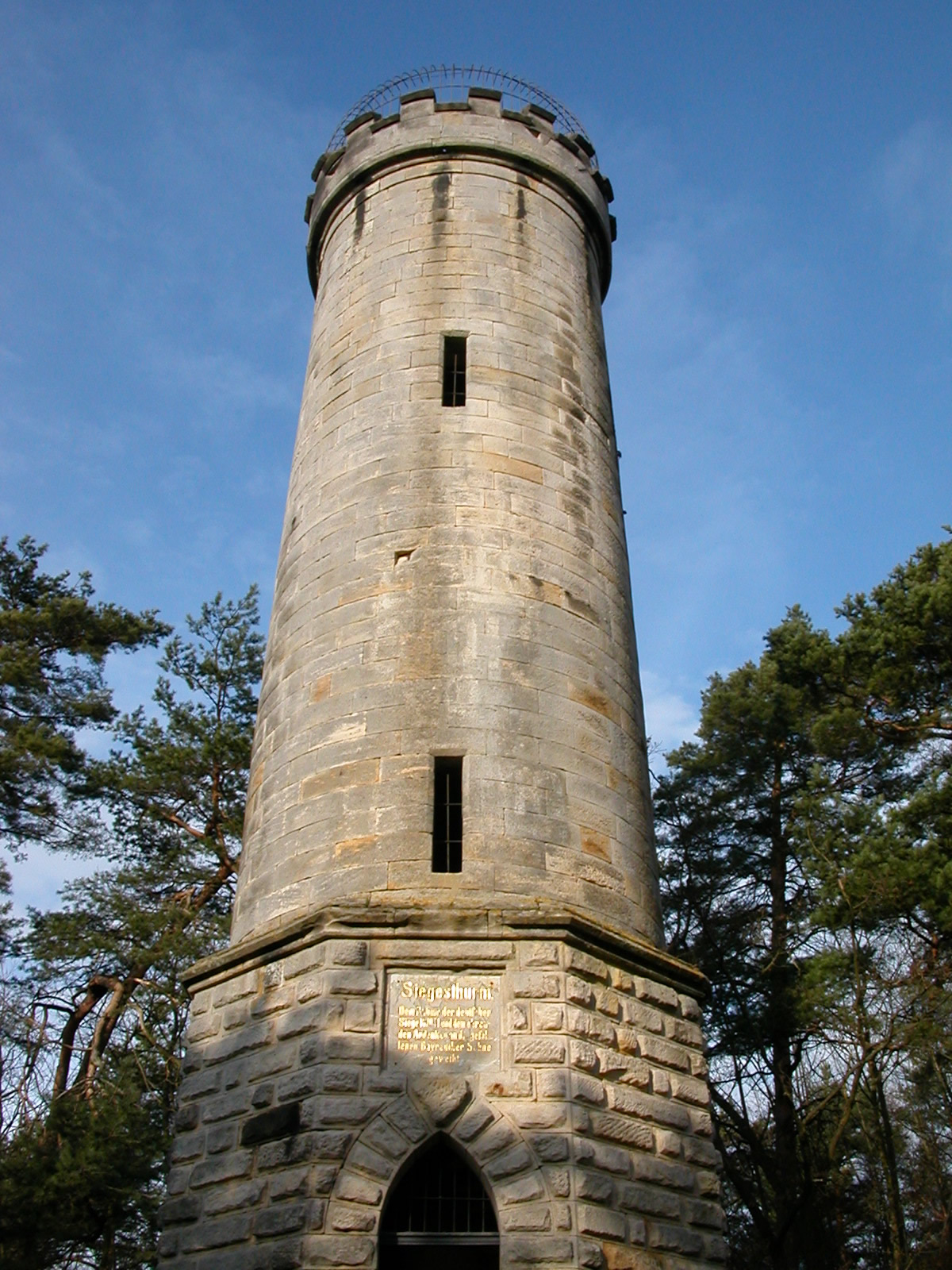
Victory Tower (Siegesturm)

== Parishes ==
To the north and east lies the hills are in the parish of Bindlach, in the south in the borough of Bayreuth, in the west on the parish of Heinersreuth.

The following villages lie on the hill range:

- Schupfenschlag
- Stöckig
- Neuhaus
- Gemein
- Crottendorf
- Pferch
- Euben
- Buchhof
- Hochtheta
- Theta
- Unterkonnersreuth
- Cottenbach
- Hermannshof
- Wendelhöfen
- Forkenhof

== Peaks ==
- Hirschberg (493 m above NN)
- Hohe Wart, Victory tower (Siegesturm) (463 m ANN) - erected after the Franco-Prussian War of 1870/71
- Kühnleite (457 m ANN)
- Schupfenschlager Höhe (452 m ANN)

== Rivers and lakes ==
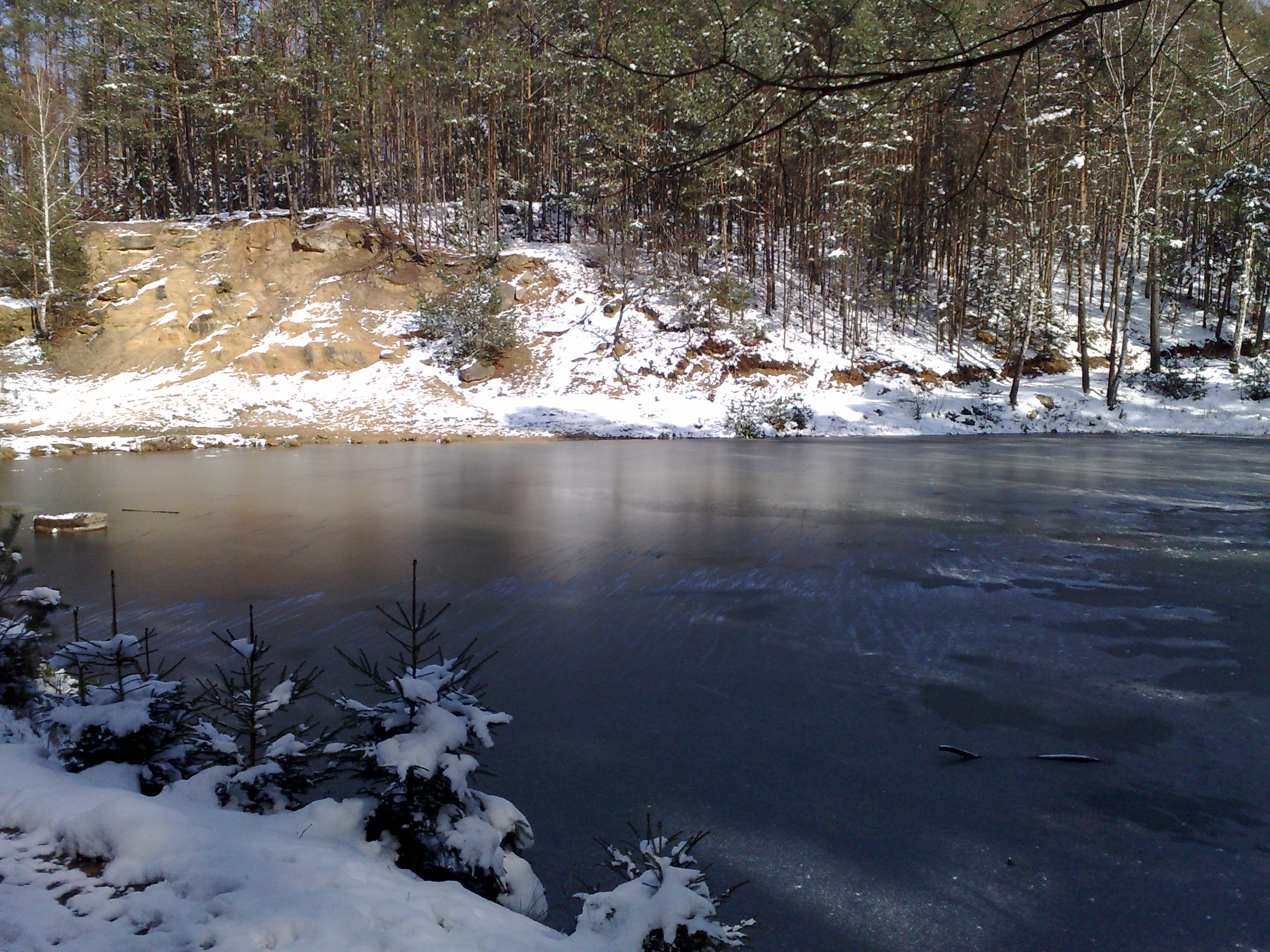
The Eisbachsee in April 2008

Rivers/streams:

- Hirschbach rises on the Hirschberg and flows into the Trebgast (White Main)
- Eisbach begins at the Eisbachsee and flows into the Trebgast
- Cottenbach begins at the Hirschbergsee and flows into the Red Main
- Altbach rises at the foot of the Schupfenschlager Höhe and flows into the Trebgast

Lakes:

- Eisbachsee
- Hirschbergsee
- Schupfenschlager Weiher

== Crags ==
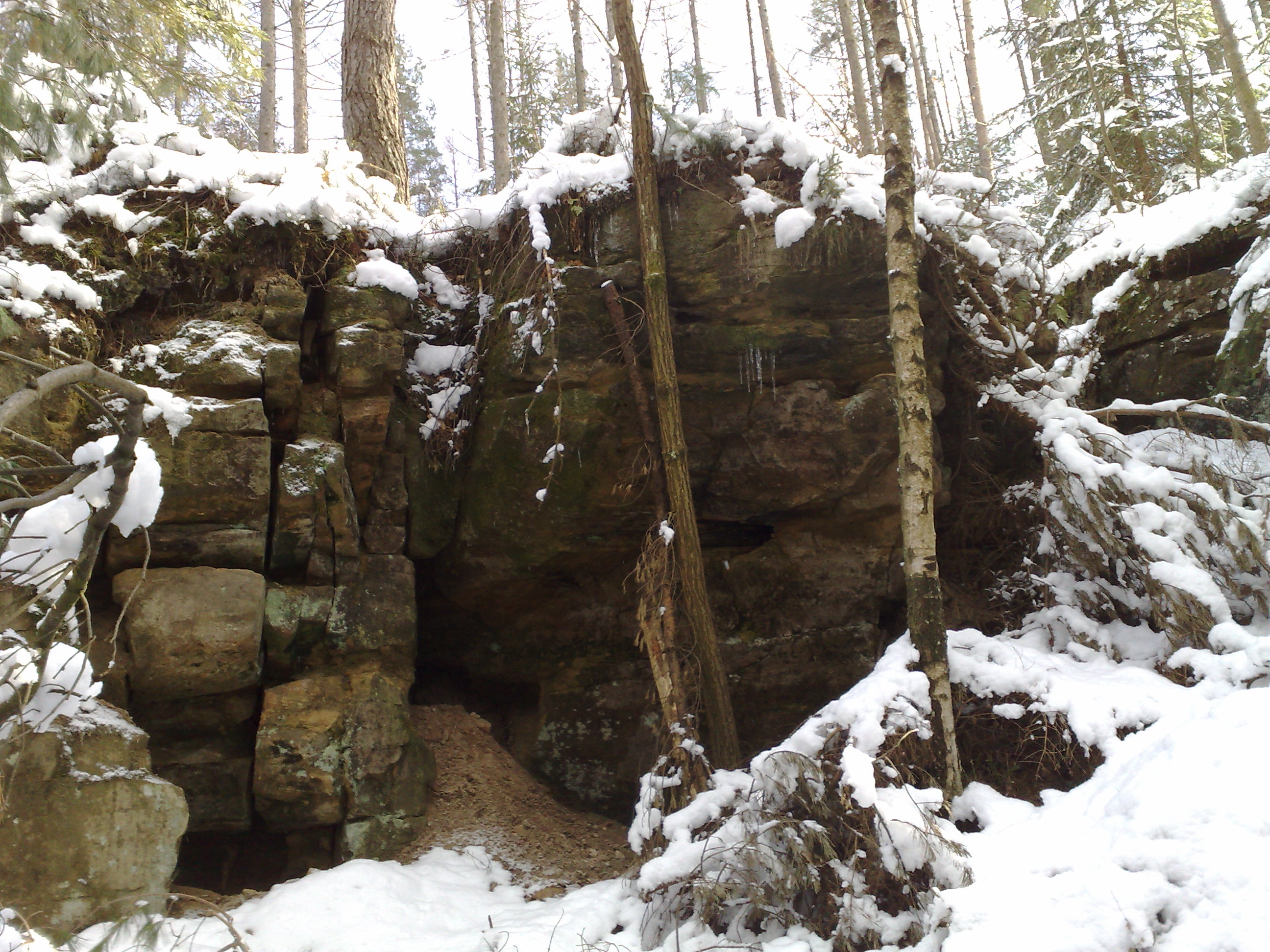
The Eisbach gorge in April 2008

- Neuhauser Felsmassiv (near Neuhaus)
- Eisgrube (near Pferch)
- Eisbachklamm (near Buchhof)
- Sandsteinfelsen Hohe Wart (near Hermannshof)
- Cottenbachklamm (near Euben)
- Ludwigsfelsen named after King Ludwig I of Bavaria (near Hochtheta/Kühnleite)

== Tourism ==
The main tourist attraction in the region is the Victory Tower (Siegesturm) in Bayreuth, on the Hohe Warte. The eastern part is less popular. Almost the entire areas is a protected landscape. The ridge is also called the "Gateway to the Bavarian Northern Forests" (Tor zum Bayrischen Nortwald, the old name for the Franconian Forest and Fichtel Mountains, because it was the first range of hills in the Fichtel Mountains from the valley of the Red Main. The Bavarian Nortwald hiking trail also begins at Hirschberg.

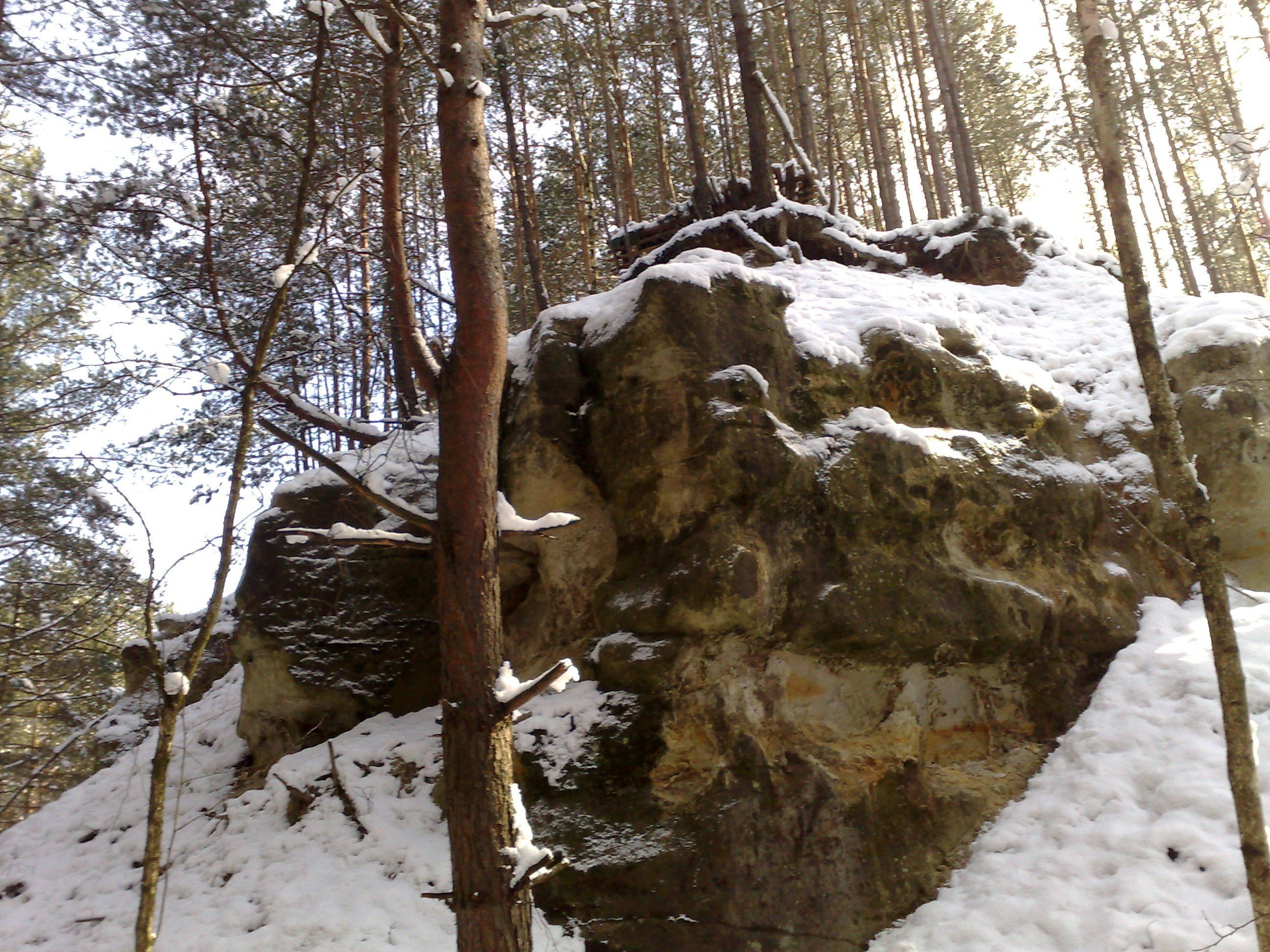
Crag on the Neuhaus rock massif, April 2008

== Economy ==
The region is important for forestry, being used and maintained by the Bavarian State Forests. The source region around the Hohe Wart is almost exclusively used to supply water to the town of Bayreuth and there is also an elevated drinking water reservoir. East of the Hohe Warte lies the hospital named after it, the Klinik Hohe Warte
