= Red Main Spring =

Coordinates: 49°51′20″N 11°31′55″E

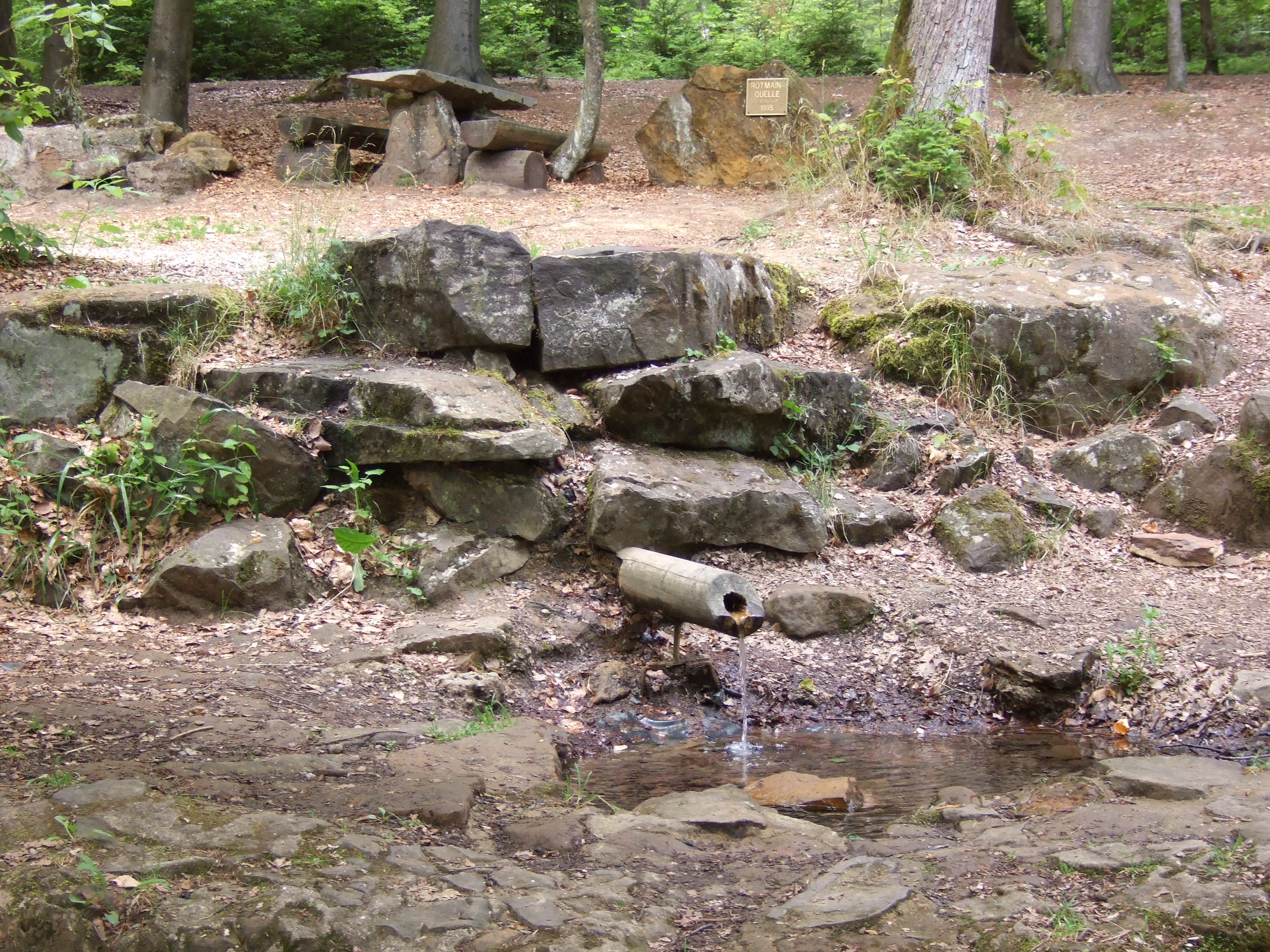
Source of the Red Main in the Lindenhardt Forest

The Red Main Spring (German: Rotmainquelle) is the source of the Red Main river, the left-hand and southern headstream of the River Main in Germany. It is located in the Lindenhardt Forest, ten kilometres south of Bayreuth near Hörlasreuth at a height of 581 m above sea level (NN) on the southern slopes of the Tannenberg (596 m). Although the Red Main is several kilometres longer than the Weiße Main, the stronger White Main Spring is seen as the source of the Main itself.

The Red Main Spring was enclosed in stone in 1907 and, from there, the water flows along a narrow wooden pipe. The source region lies in the Franconian Switzerland-Veldenstein Forest Nature Park and belongs geologically to the Brown Jura.

The river gets its name from the boggy red subsoil and the associated fluvial sediment that gives it its red appearance. In the vicinity of the Red Main Spring is the origin of the Fichtenohe, the upper course of the River Pegnitz.
