= Kleiner Koserbach =

River in Germany

Location
- Country: Germany
- States: Bavaria

Physical characteristics
- Mouth
  - location: Koserbach
  - coordinates: 50.1357°N 11.6184°E

Basin features
- Progression: Koserbach→ Schorgast→ White Main→ Main→ Rhine→ North Sea

Kleiner Koserbach is a small river of Bavaria, Germany. It flows into the Koserbach near Wirsberg.

== See also ==
- List of rivers of Bavaria
