= Kronach (disambiguation) =

Kronach is a town in Upper Franconia, Bavaria, Germany, capital of the eponymous district.

Kronach may also refer to:

- Kronach (district), a Landkreis (district) in Bavaria, Germany
- Kronach (Haßlach), a river of Bavaria, Germany, tributary of the Haßlach
- Kronach (White Main), a river of Bavaria, Germany, tributary of the White Main
- Kronach, a district of the town Fürth in Bavaria, Germany
