= Dühlbach =

River in Germany

Location
- Country: Germany
- State: Bavaria

Physical characteristics
- Mouth
  - location: Red Main
  - coordinates: 49.9790°N 11.5258°E
- Length: 5.7 km (3.5 mi)

Basin features
- Progression: Red Main→ Main→ Rhine→ North Sea subdivision_type1 = Country

Dühlbach is a river of Bavaria, Germany. It flows into the Red Main near Heinersreuth.

== See also ==
- List of rivers of Bavaria
