= White Main Spring =

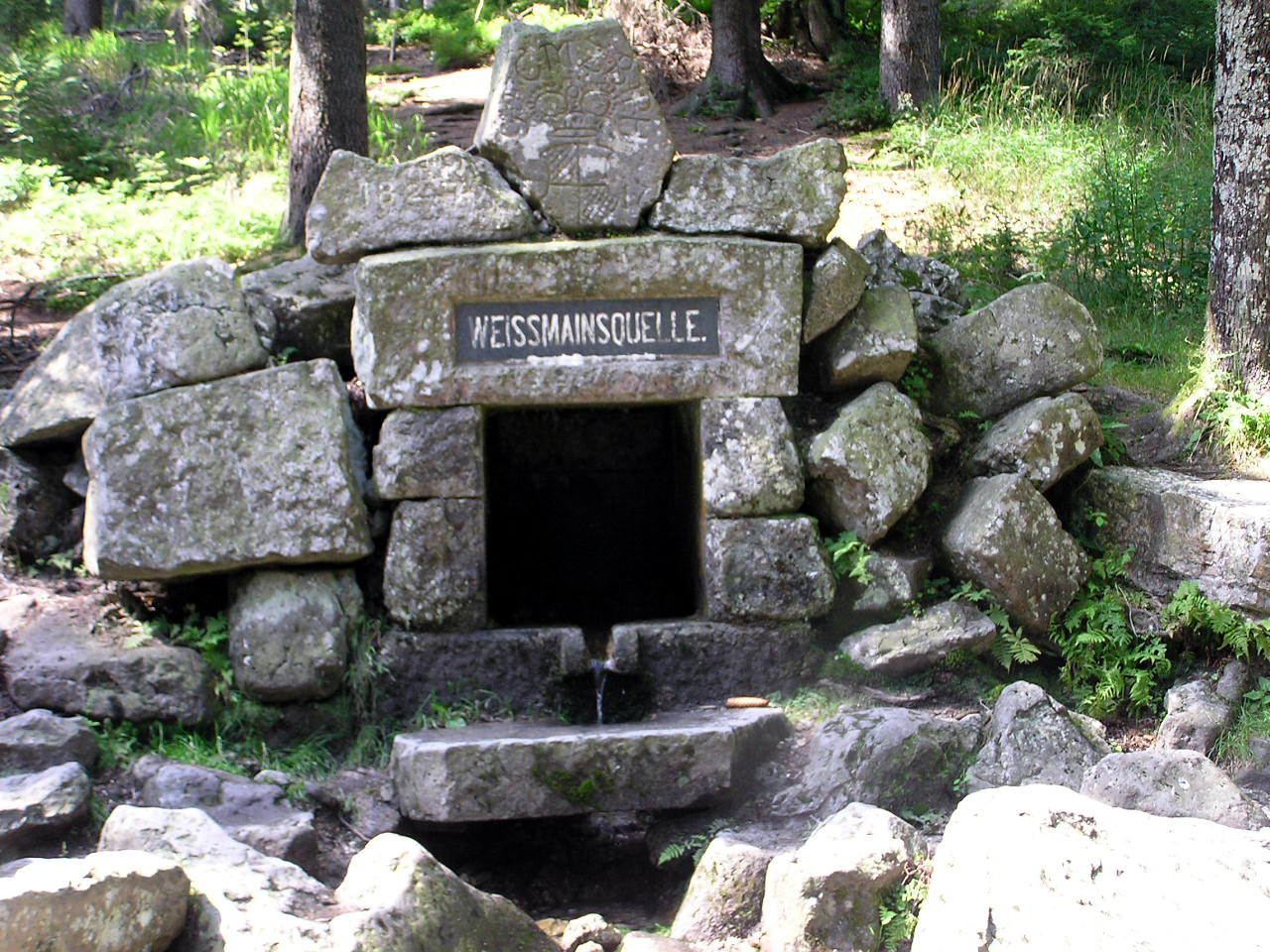
The White Main Spring on the Ochsenkopf

The White Main Spring (German: Weißmainquelle) is the source of the White Main river, the right-hand and northern headstream of the River Main, a major tributary of the Rhine in Germany. It is located at a height of 887 metres above sea level on the eastern slopes of the Ochsenkopf mountain and is viewed as the source of the Main, even though the Red Main is several kilometres longer. Usually the White Main Spring is stronger (i.e. has a higher volumetric flow) than the Red Main Spring.

Margrave Frederick of Brandenburg had it traced in 1717 and impounded in granite blocks bearing the Hohenzollern coat of arms. The spring bears the name Fürstenbrunnen ("Prince's Well"), but is not to be confused with the Upper and Lower Fürstenbrunnen on the Ochsenkopf. By contrast, in 1785 Goethe considered the Seehausbrunnen (50.0324418°N 11.871652°E) southeast of the Schneeberg as the source of the Main and wrote: "the source of the Main, which rises right by the house here and makes the brook look like a tin wash".

The White Main Spring gets its name from the light-coloured, granitic subsoil which gives the river its white appearance.

Over the Ochsenkopf runs the European Watershed between the source of the Main, whose waters reach the North Sea via the Rhine, and the nearby Fichtelnaab Spring, which drains via the Fichtelnaab and Danube into the Black Sea.

The White Main Spring is a station on the Spring Way maintained by the Fichtelgebirge Club.

== Geotope ==
The spring is designated by the Bavarian Department of the Environment as Geotope 472Q003.

== Literature ==
- Dietmar Herrmann: Der Ochsenkopf im Fichtelgebirge; Band 17/2009 der Schriftenreihe des Fichtelgebirgsvereins Das Fichtelgebirge (comprehensive description of the spring)
