= Koserbach =

River in Germany

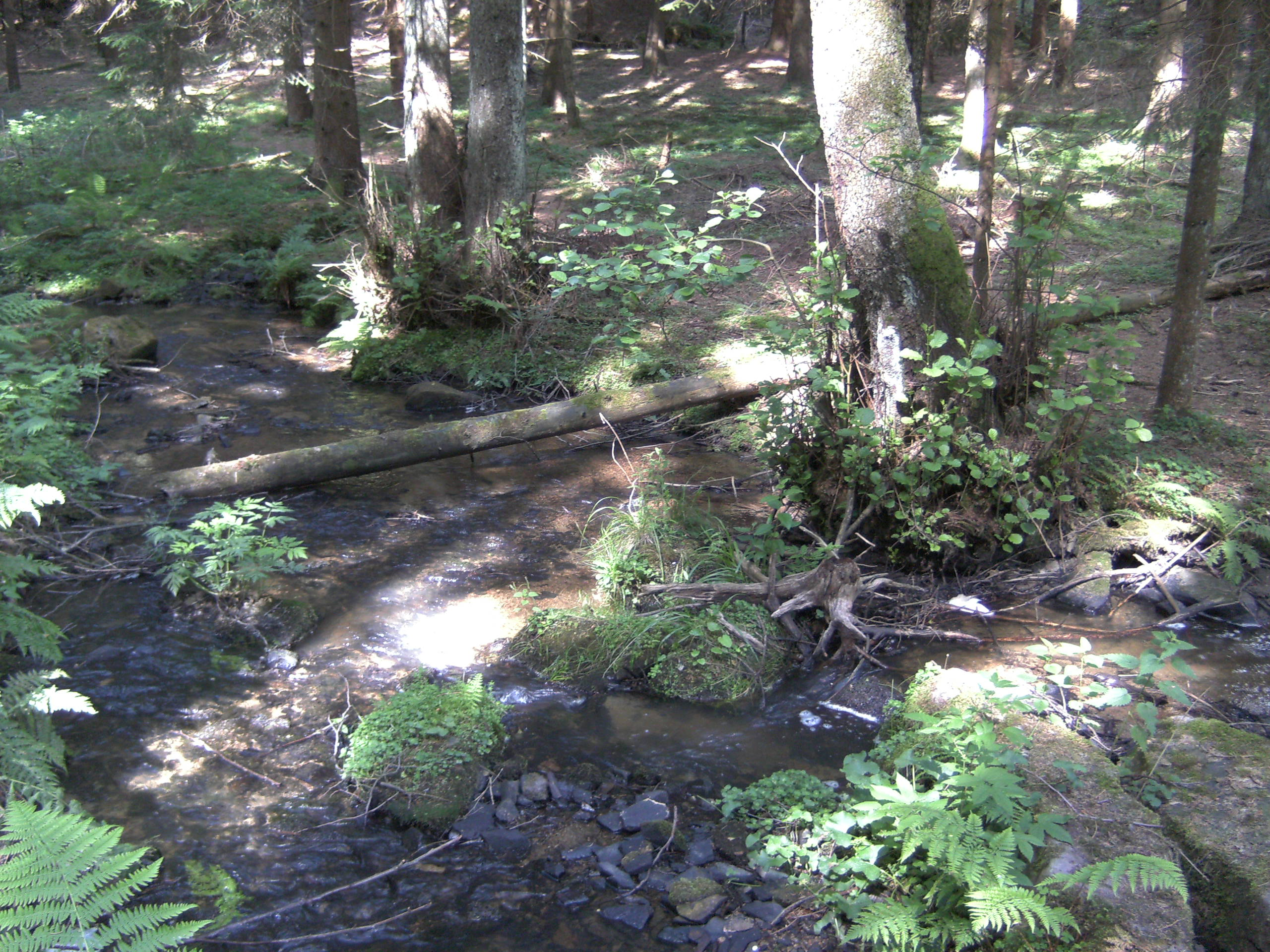
- Großer Koserbach

Location
- Country: Germany
- State: Bavaria

Physical characteristics
- Mouth
  - location: Schorgast
  - coordinates: 50.1078°N 11.6094°E
- Length: 14.0 km (8.7 mi)

Basin features
- Progression: Schorgast→ White Main→ Main→ Rhine→ North Sea
- Tributaries
  - right: Kleiner Koserbach

Koserbach (in its upper course: Großer Koserbach) (also: Koser) is a river of Bavaria, Germany. It is a right tributary of the Schorgast in Wirsberg.

== See also ==
- List of rivers of Bavaria
