= Ölschnitz =

Ölschnitz may refer to:

- Ölschnitz (Red Main), headstream of the Red Main, Bavaria, Germany
- Ölschnitz (White Main), headstream of the White Main, Bavaria, Germany
