= Trebgast (disambiguation) =

Trebgast is a municipality in Bavaria, Germany.

Trebgast may also refer to:

- TSV Trebgast, a German association football club from the municipality
- Trebgast (White Main), a river of Bavaria, Germany, tributary of the White Main
