= Dobrach =

River in Germany

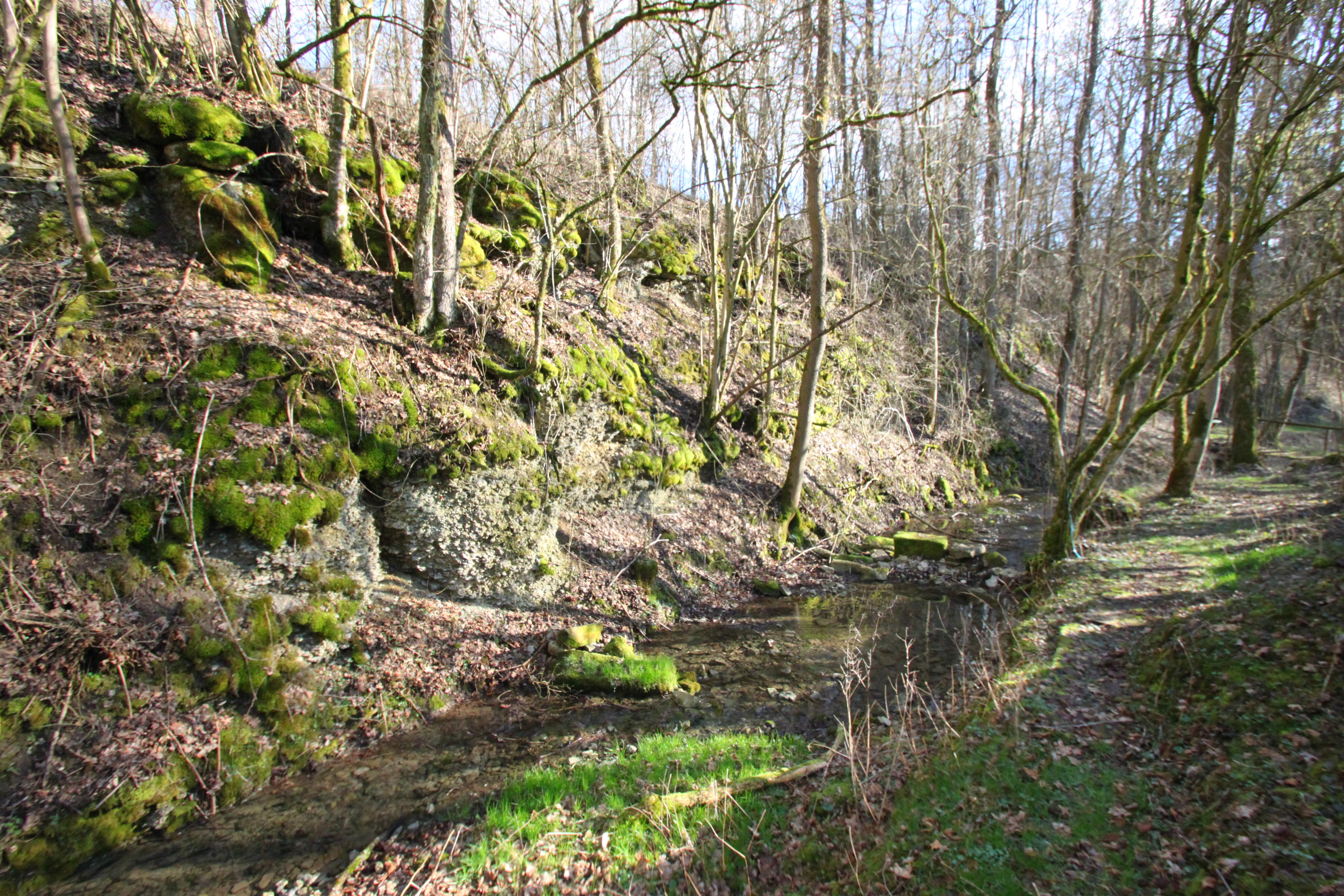
- The Dobrach above Grafendobrach (part of Kulmbach)

Location
- Country: Germany
- State: Bavaria

Physical characteristics
- Mouth
  - location: White Main
  - coordinates: 50.1144°N 11.4435°E
- Length: 10.2 km (6.3 mi)

Basin features
- Progression: White Main→ Main→ Rhine→ North Sea

The Dobrach is a river in Bavaria, Germany. It flows into the White Main near Kulmbach.

== See also ==
- List of rivers of Bavaria
