= Schorgast =

River in Germany

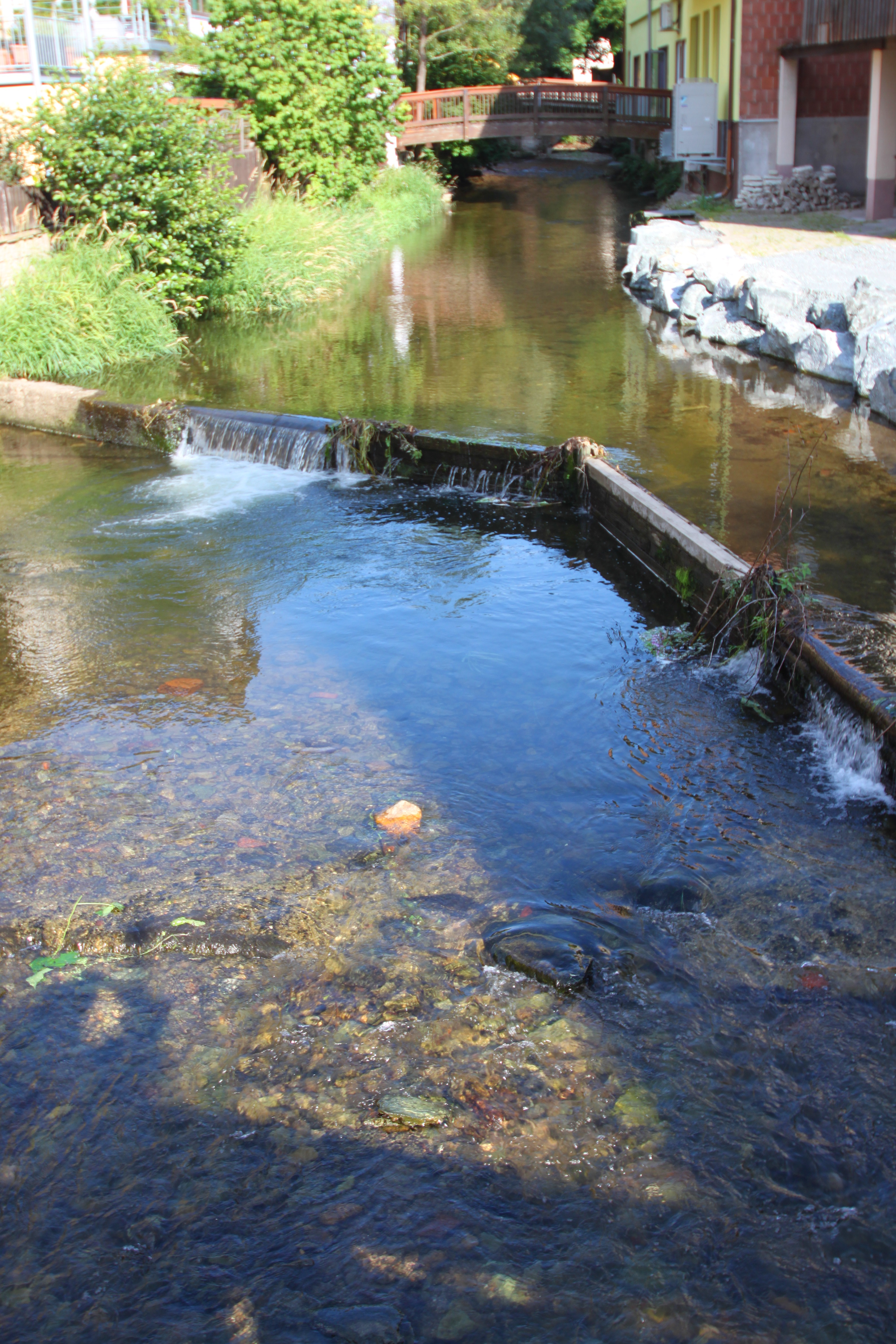
- The Schorgast in Wirsberg next to the old town hall

Location
- Country: Germany
- State: Bavaria

Physical characteristics
- Mouth
  - location: White Main
  - coordinates: 50.1129°N 11.5015°E
- Length: 19.5 km (12.1 mi)

Basin features
- Progression: White Main→ Main→ Rhine→ North Sea
- Tributaries
  - right: Koserbach, Untere Steinach

The Schorgast is a river of Bavaria, Germany. It flows, from the right, into the White Main east of Kulmbach.

== See also ==
- List of rivers of Bavaria
