= Untere Steinach =

River in Germany

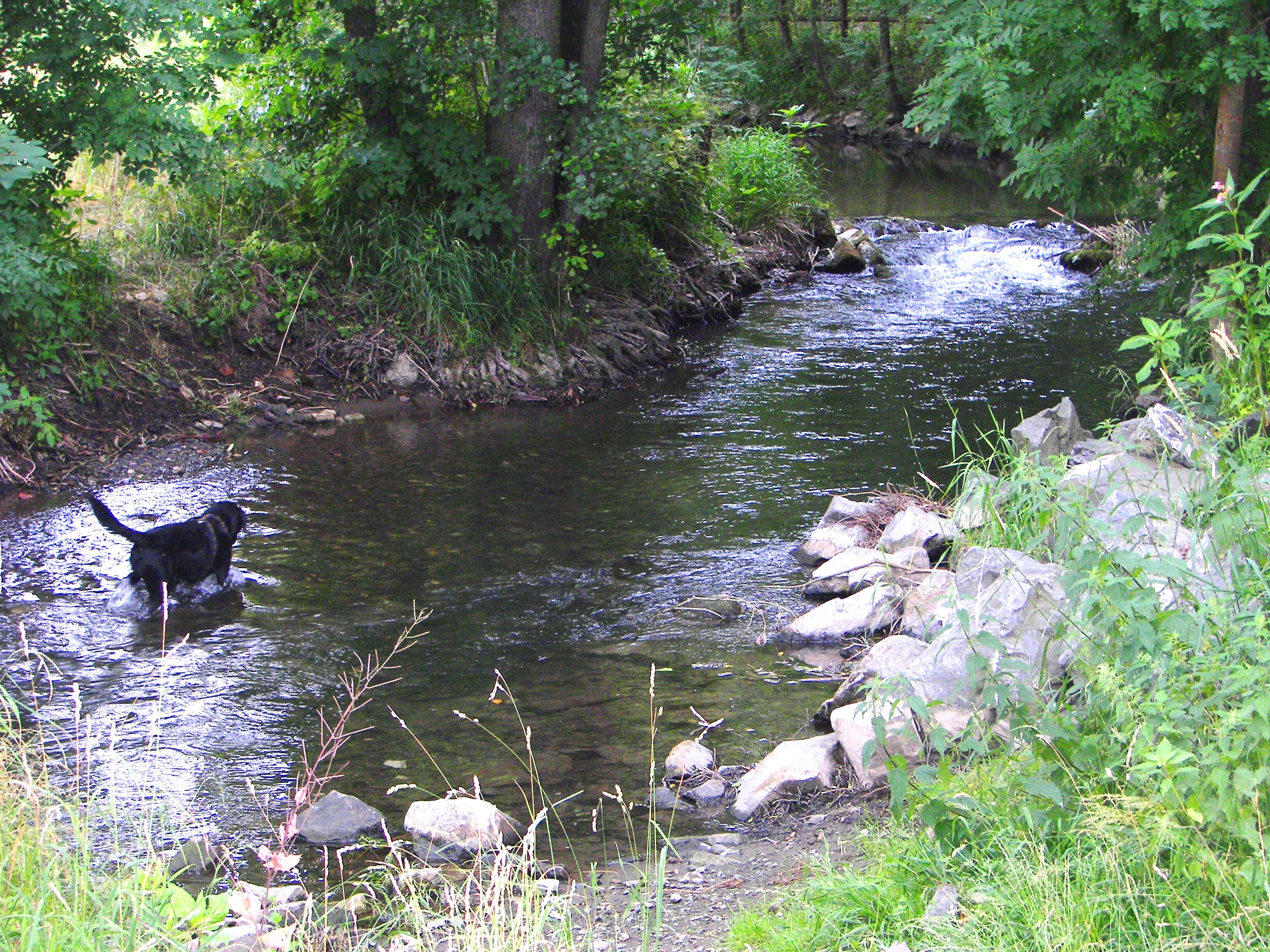
- The Untere Steinach between Untersteinach und Stadtsteinach

Location
- Country: Germany
- State: Bavaria

Physical characteristics
- Mouth
  - location: Schorgast
  - coordinates: 50.1275°N 11.5269°E
- Length: 24.7 km (15.3 mi)

Basin features
- Progression: Schorgast→ White Main→ Main→ Rhine→ North Sea

The Untere Steinach (or Lower Steinach, in its upper course: Rehbach) is a river in Bavaria, Germany. It flows into the Schorgast in Untersteinach.

== See also ==
- List of rivers of Bavaria
