= Mistel (Red Main) =

River in Germany

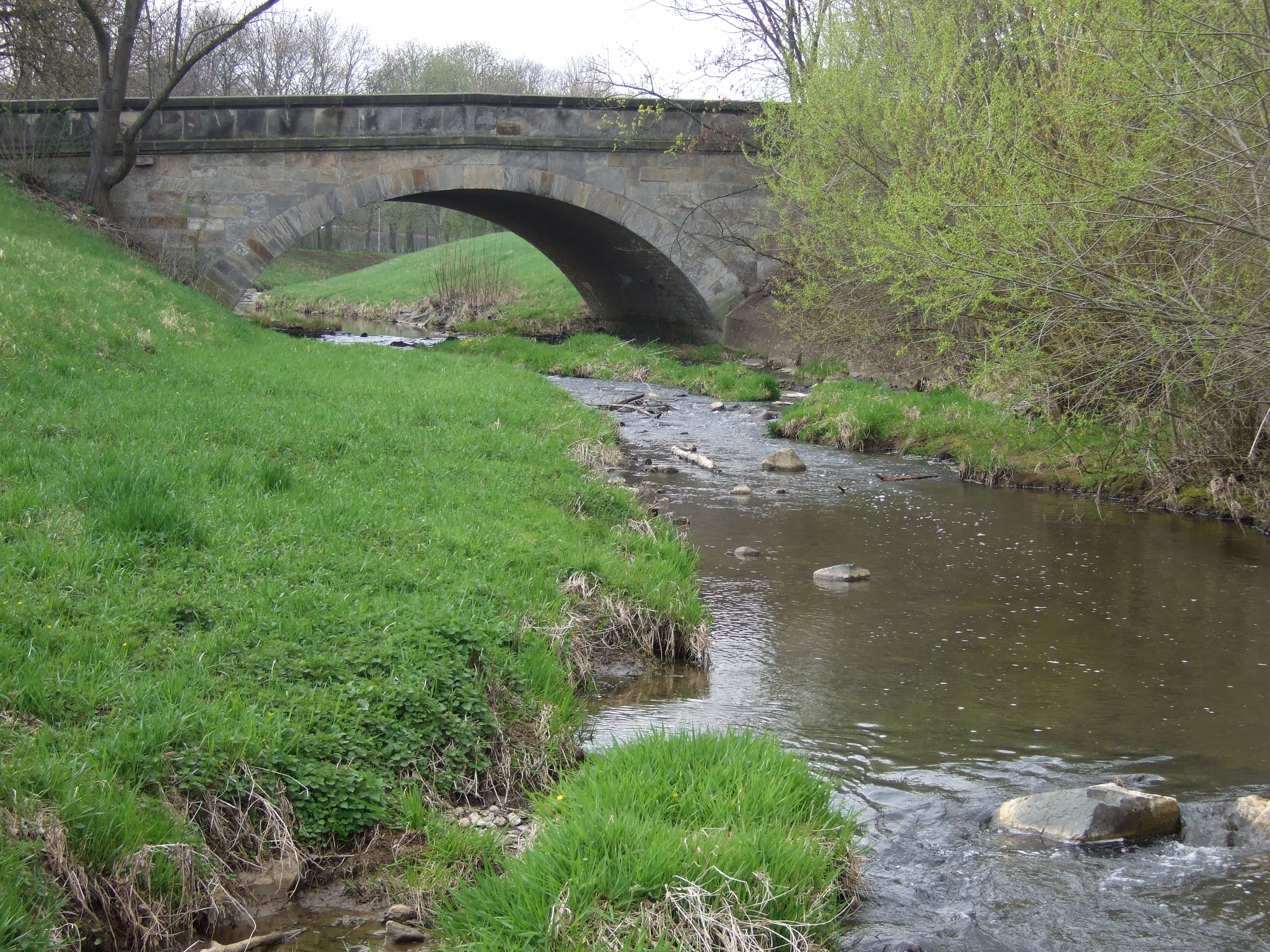
- The Mistel in Bayreuth

Location
- Country: Germany
- State: Bavaria

Physical characteristics
- Mouth
  - location: Red Main
  - coordinates: 49.9481°N 11.5685°E
- Length: 13.8 km (8.6 mi)

Basin features
- Progression: Red Main→ Main→ Rhine→ North Sea

Mistel is a river of Bavaria, Germany. It is a left tributary of the Red Main in Bayreuth.

== See also ==
- List of rivers of Bavaria
