= Emtmannsberg =

- Municipality
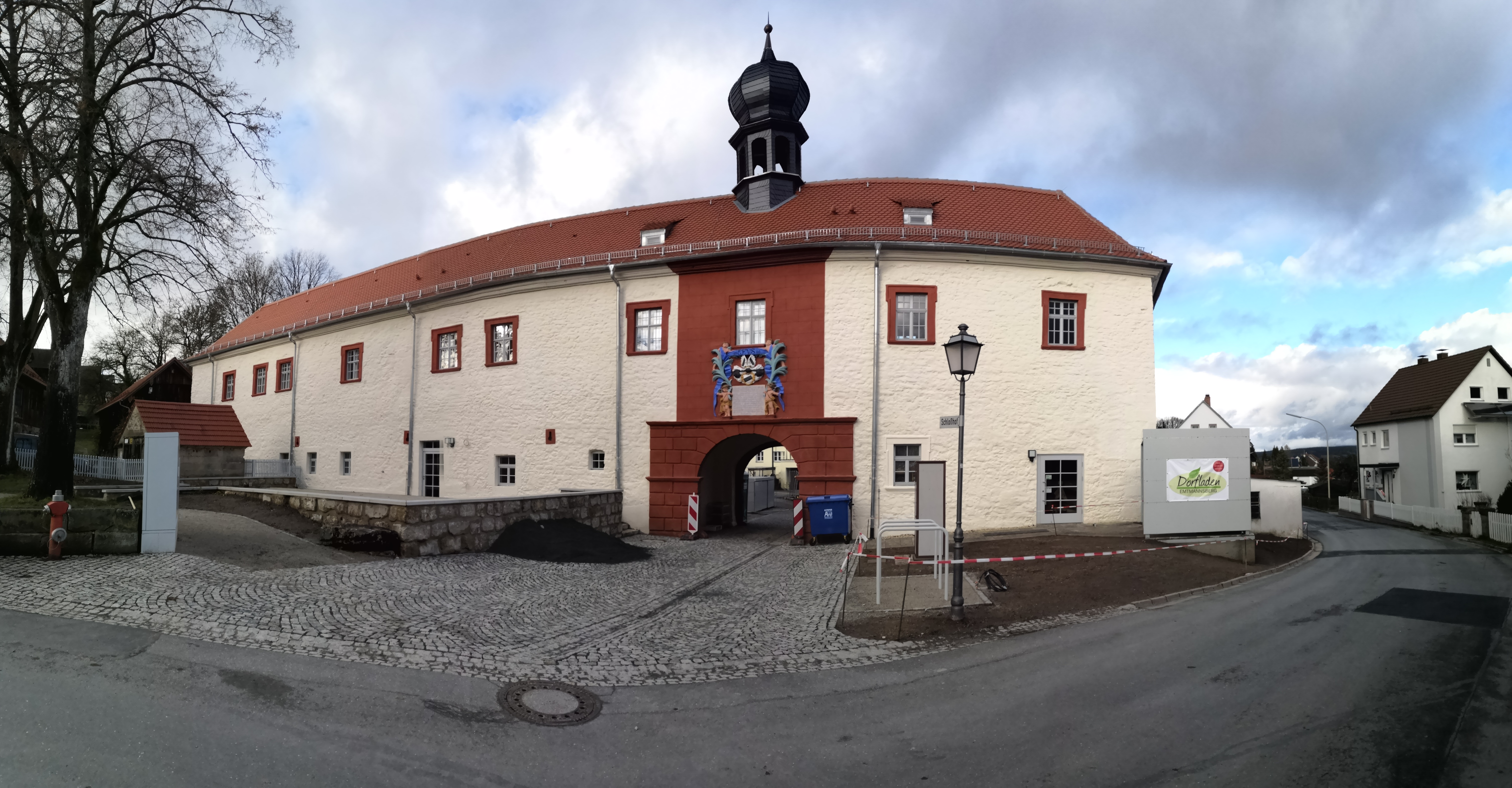
- Emtmannsberg Castle

- Coat of arms

- Location of Emtmannsberg within Bayreuth district
- Interactive map of Emtmannsberg
- Location within Germany Location within Bavaria
- Coordinates: 49°53′29″N 11°38′41″E
- Country: Germany
- State: Bavaria
- Admin. region: Oberfranken
- District: Bayreuth
- Municipal assoc.: Weidenberg
- Subdivisions: 20 Ortsteile

Government
  - Mayor (2020–26): Gerhard Herrmannsdörfer

Area
  - Total: 22.31 km^{2} (8.61 sq mi)
- Elevation: 469 m (1,539 ft)

Population (2025-12-31)
  - Total: 979
  - Density: 43.9/km^{2} (114/sq mi)
- Time zone: UTC+01:00 (CET)
  - Summer (DST): UTC+02:00 (CEST)
- Postal codes: 95517
- Dialling codes: 09209
- Vehicle registration: BT
- Website: www.emtmannsberg.de

Emtmannsberg is a municipality in the district of Bayreuth in Upper Franconia in Bavaria, Germany.

The Ölschnitz river begins near Emtmannsberg-Unterölschnitz at the confluence of the Laimbach and Bieberswöhrbach.
