= Friesenbach (Red Main) =

River in Germany

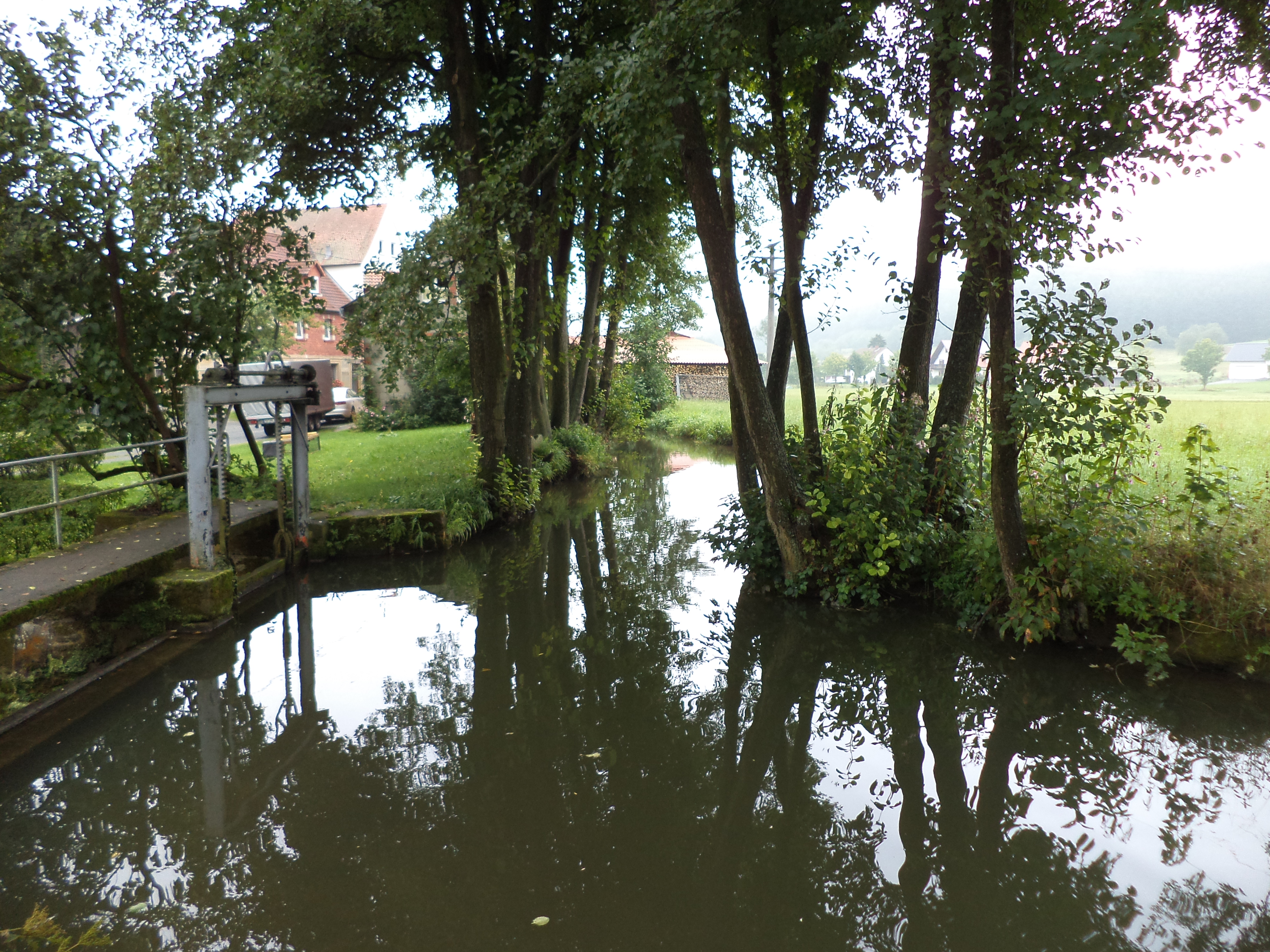
- The Friesenbach at Hutschdorf (parish of Thurnau)

Location
- Country: Germany
- State: Bavaria

Physical characteristics
- Mouth
  - location: Red Main
  - coordinates: 50.0571°N 11.4483°E
- Length: 10.6 km (6.6 mi)

Basin features
- Progression: Red Main→ Main→ Rhine→ North Sea

Friesenbach is a river of Bavaria, Germany at the edge of the Franconian Jura. The Friesenbach is a left tributary of the Red Main and about 11 kilometres (6.8 mi) long.

== See also ==
- List of rivers of Bavaria
