= Streitmühlbach =

River in Germany

Location
- Country: Germany
- State: Bavaria

Physical characteristics
- Mouth
  - location: White Main
  - coordinates: 50.0633°N 11.5913°E

Basin features
- Progression: White Main→ Main→ Rhine→ North Sea

Streitmühlbach is a river of Bavaria, Germany. It flows into the White Main in Himmelkron.

== Geography ==
=== Course ===
The Streitmühlbach stream originates near Marktschorgast - Rohrersreuth from several headstreams. It flows into the White Main River near Himmelkron.

== See also ==
- List of rivers of Bavaria
