= Red Main =

River in Germany

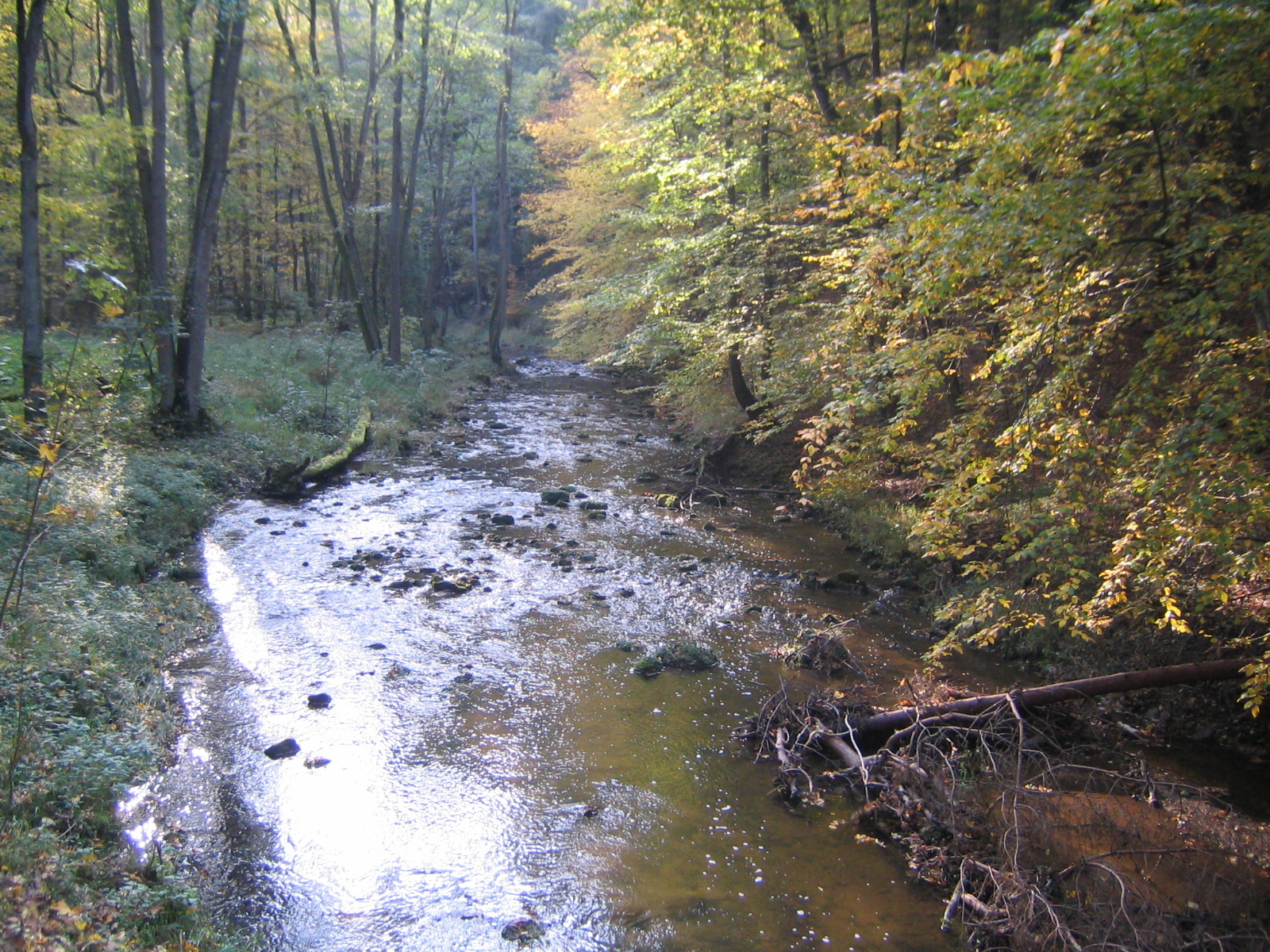
- The Red Main east of Bayreuth

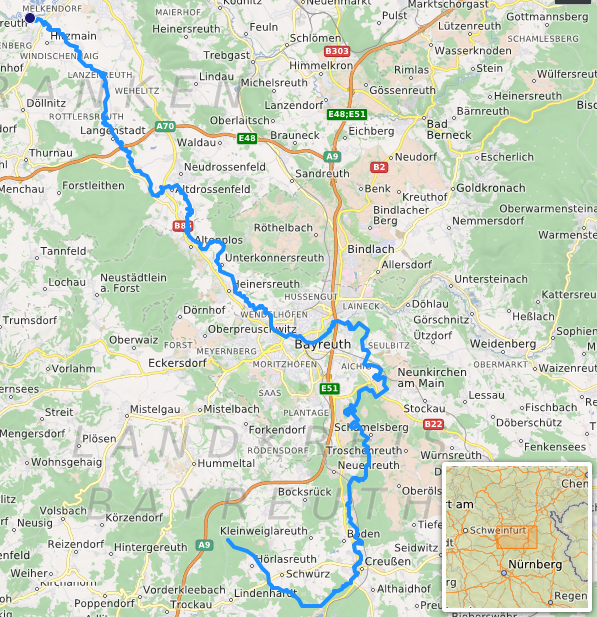
- Path of the Roter Main River

Location
- Country: Germany
- State: Bavaria
- District: Upper Franconia
- Reference no.: DE: 2412

Physical characteristics
- Source
  - location: the Red Main Spring in the Lindenhardt Forest, 10 kilometres south of Bayreuth near Hörlasreuth (Creußen)
  - coordinates: 49°51′23″N 11°31′59″E
  - elevation: 581 m above sea level (NN)
- Mouth
  - location: Confluence: south of Kulmbach, near Steinenhausen Castle with the White Main into the Main
  - coordinates: 50°05′13″N 11°23′56″E
  - elevation: 298 m above sea level (NN)
- Length: 71.8 km (44.6 mi)
- Basin size: 519 km^{2} (200 sq mi)
- Discharge
  - average: 4.7 m³/s

Basin features
- Progression: Main→ Rhine→ North Sea
- Landmarks: Large towns: Bayreuth

The Red Main (German: Roter Main or Rotmain) is a river in southern Germany. It is the southern, left headstream of the river Main. It rises in the hills of Franconian Switzerland, near Haag and flows generally northwest through the towns Creußen, Bayreuth, Heinersreuth and Neudrossenfeld. It merges with the White Main near Kulmbach to form the Main. The Red Main is 72 kilometres (45 mi) long and descends a total of 283 metres (928 ft).

The waters of the Red Main flow through a region of clayey soils, which is why the river carries a lot of suspended solids, especially after rainfall, and acquires a red-brown colour, hence the name Red Main.

== Sources ==
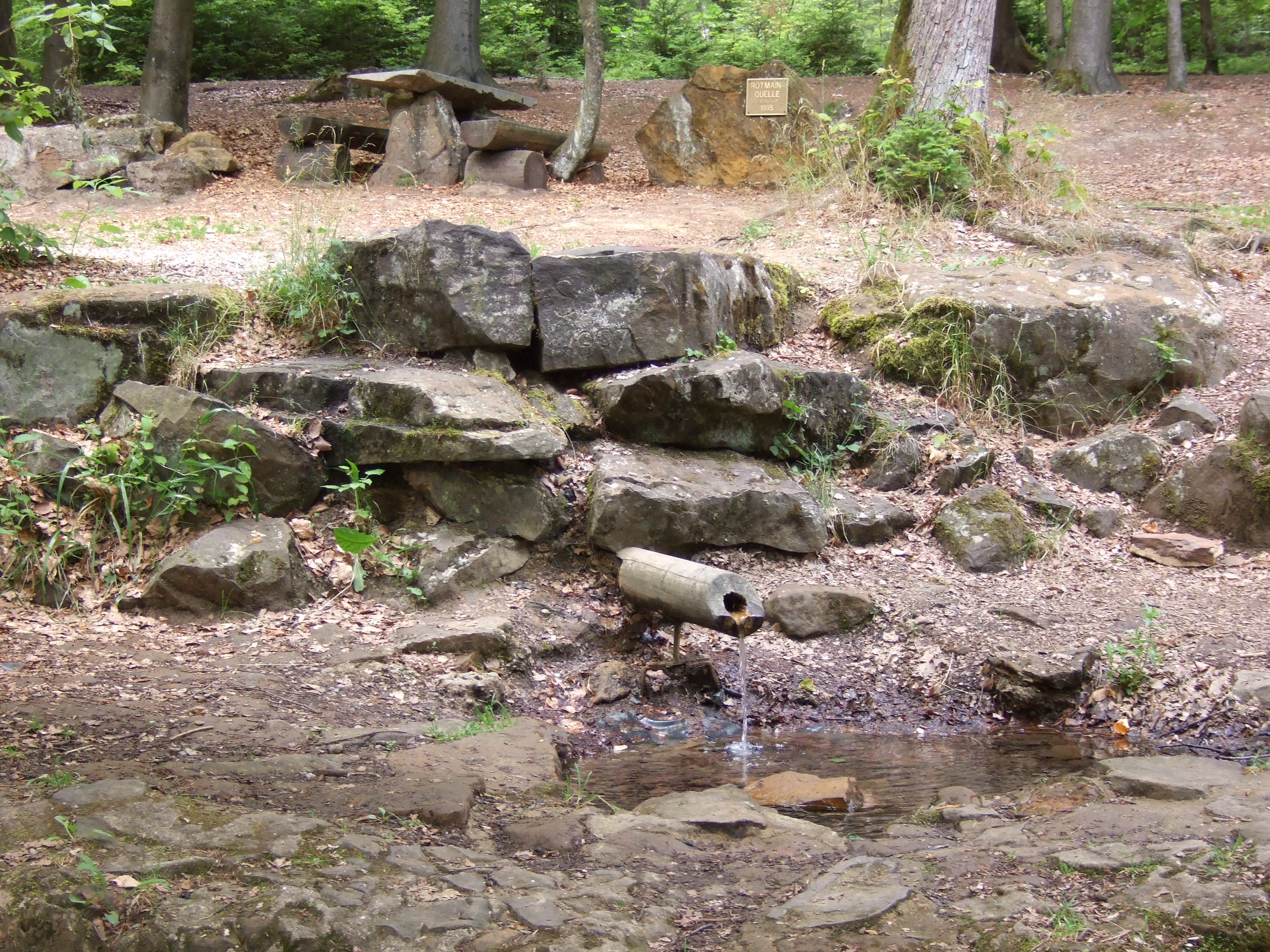
Source in the Lindenhardt Forest

The Red Main rises 10 kilometres (6.2 mi) south of Bayreuth near Hörlasreuth (Creußen) in the Lindenhardt Forest at a height of 581 m above sea level (NN). The source of the Red Main (Rotmainquelle) was impounded in stone in 1907, the water flows out of a small wooden pipe. Its source region lies in the Franconian Switzerland-Veldenstein Forest Nature Park. Geologically, it belongs to the Brown Jura.

== Course ==
The Red Main flows initially in a southeasterly direction, before it swings northeast and passes through Creußen. From there it heads almost due north and then turns west beyond Eremitage. It passes through the town of Bayreuth from east to west. In the town centre it has been confined since the 1970s in a concrete channel and partially covered.

In the vicinity of the Bayreuth folk festival square the river divides into two branches. The southern branch is called the Mühlkanal, because it used to feed several mills within the town. Its water flow is held roughly constant by a weir and it runs above ground as far as the Münzgasse. Behind the former state central bank it disappears into a tunnel and surfaces again opposite the Graser School just before reuniting with the northern branch. In the late 1990s a section of the channel in Opernstraße was exposed and swept up as part of the rebuilding at the southern end of Luitpoldplatz.

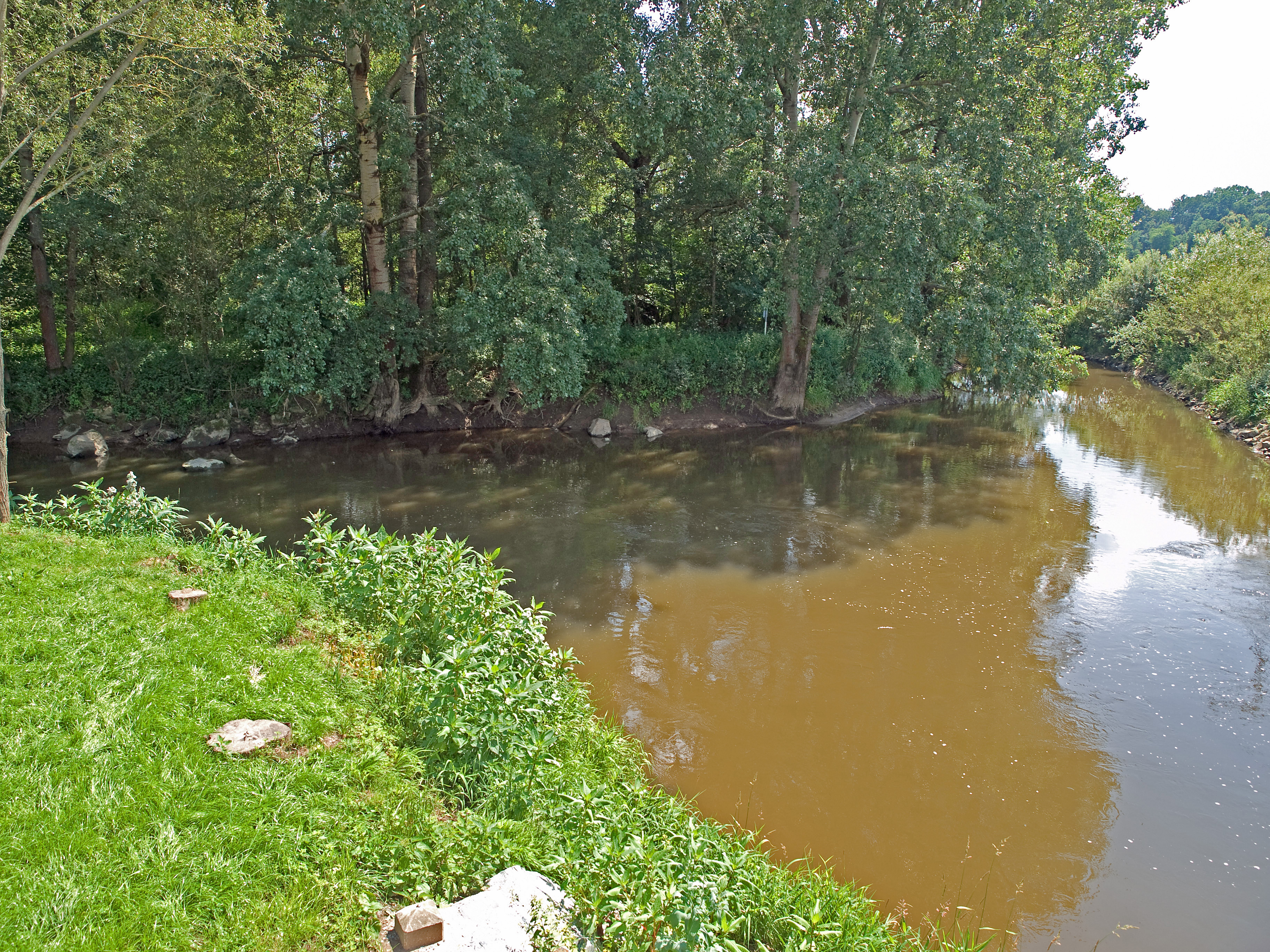
Confluence of the Red and White Main near Kulmbach

The northern arm usually carries only a small amount of water, but acts as a flood channel at times of high water and has a very wide river bed. It is partly covered by two car parks.

Beyond Bayreuth the Red Main flows northwest in wide meanders through a broad valley, past the villages of Heinersreuth and Neudrossenfeld. South of Kulmbach, near Steinenhausen Castle, it is united with the White Main, which rises in the Fichtel Mountains near Bischofsgrün. The Red Main is 73 kilometres (45 mi) long (source to mouth), the White Main 52 kilometres (32 mi). At the confluence of the two headstreams a bridge was built in 2009 where the young Main may be crossed right at its beginning. Information boards on the bridge describe the rest of the river's course, the local walking and cycle routes and the surrounding countryside.

== Bodenmühlwand geotope ==
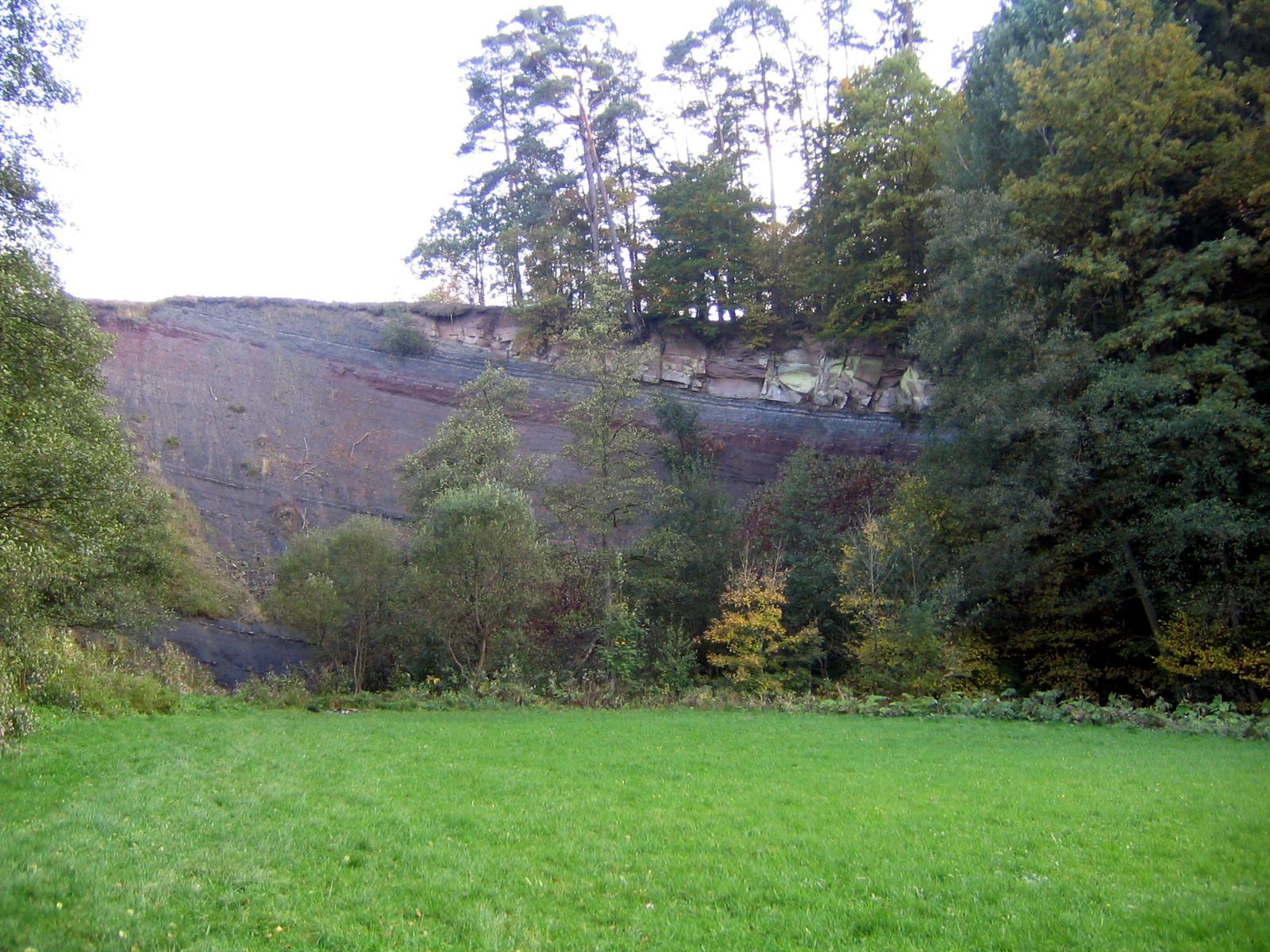
Keuper outcrop on the Bodenmühlwand

In the vicinity of the Bodenmühle mill east of Bayreuth, the Red Main has carved out a bluff (Prallhang) on a bend in the river caused by erosion, the so-called Bodenmühlwand, a steep slope 20 metres (66 ft) in height.

This has exposed rock strata from the Middle Keuper period. Around 225 million years ago the area was a coastal region with frequent changes caused in the influence of land and sea. As a result, today, layers of claystone and Benker sandstone (Estheria) lie on top of each other. In the latter, geologists found fossils of ostracods (Palaesteria minuta), after which the layers are named (in German), the remains of coelacanth as well as the scales, teeth and fin spines of prehistoric sharks. The highest and thickest rock layer belongs to reed sandstones (Stuttgart-Formation) of the Carnian stage.

== Fauna ==
The Red Main is a habitat for brown trout, grayling, barbel, bullhead, lamprey, carp, tench, carp bream, roach, perch, pike, pike-perch, eel and burbot.

== Tributaries ==
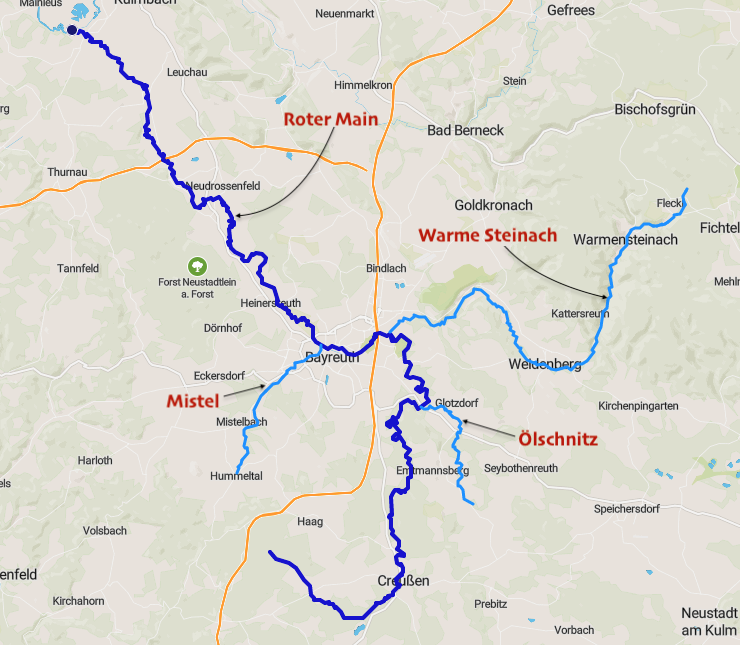
The Roter Main and its main tributaries

- Simmelbach (right)
- Eschingbach (right)
- Hühnerbach (right)
- Kupfergraben (Kaingraben) (left)
- Tiefenbach (left)
- Schwarzbach (right)
- Metzelersbach (right)
- Gosenbach (left), (7.95 km)
- Schliefgraben (right)
- Schwarzweiherbach (left)
- Weihersgraben (left)
- Brunnengraben (right)
- Schamelsgraben (right)
- Mühlwässerlein (left)
- Schnerfenbach (right)
- Thiergatenweihergraben (left)
- Ölschnitz (right), (with the Laimbach 14.72 km)
- Gereutbach (right)
- Bühlersbach (left)
- Warme Steinach (right), (24.61 km)
- Mistel (left), (11.42 km)
- Grünbaumgraben (right)
- Preuschwitzerin (left)
- Cottenbach (right)
- Tannenbach (left)
- Dühlbach (left), (7.01 km)
- Seebach (right)
- Köhlersgraben (left)
- Rottelbach (left), (6.93 km)
- Pechgraben (right)
- Erlgraben (right)
- Reuthbach (Rotbach) (left), (5.94 km)
- Schellenbach (right)
- Friesenbach (left), (8.85 km)
- Aubach (right)
- Erlenbach (right)
- Hirtengraben (left)
- Krummer Lachengraben (right)
- Proßer Bach (right)

== Trails ==
The Red Main Trail (Rotmainweg), which was laid out by Fichtelgebirge Club, begins near the source. This main footpath is marked by a red M on a white background throughout its length. Its 60 kilometre long route is as follows: Source of the Red Main-Creußen-Eimersmühle-Schlehenberg-Eremitage-Bayreuth-Martinsreuth-Altenplos-Grüngraben-Jöslein-Langenstadt-Affalterhof Katschenreuth-Steinenhausen Castle near Kulmbach (confluence with the White Main).

The Main-Mies Trail (Main-Mies-Weg), established by the Upper Palatinate Forest Club (Oberpfälzer-Wald-Verein) also begins near the source. Here the trail is marked by at red diagonal cross on a white background. The 93 km long route is as follows: Source of the Red Main-Creußen-Seidwitz-Frankenberg-Neustadt am Kulm-Erbendorf-Falkenberg-Tirschenreuth-Griesbach.

== Sources ==
- M. Johann Willen: Das Teutsche Paradeiß in dem vortrefflichen Fichtelberg. In: Archiv für Geschichte von Oberfranken. Band 15, Heft 3, p. 167
- Johann Christoph Pachelbel: Ausführliche Beschreibung des Fichtel-Berges im Nordgau liegend. Leipzig 1716, p. 18
- Faltblatt des Fichtelgebirgsvereins: Der Rotmainweg (detailed route description)
- Gustav Schmidt: Der Obermain von den Quellen bis Bamberg. In: Heimatbeilage zum Oberfränkischen Schulanzeiger. Nr. 325/2005
- Franz X. Bogner: Der Obermain. Ein Luftbildporträt von Bayreuth bis Bamberg. Ellwanger-Verlag, Bayreuth 2006, ISBN 3-925361-57-X
