= Koser KB-3 Jadran =

Jadran
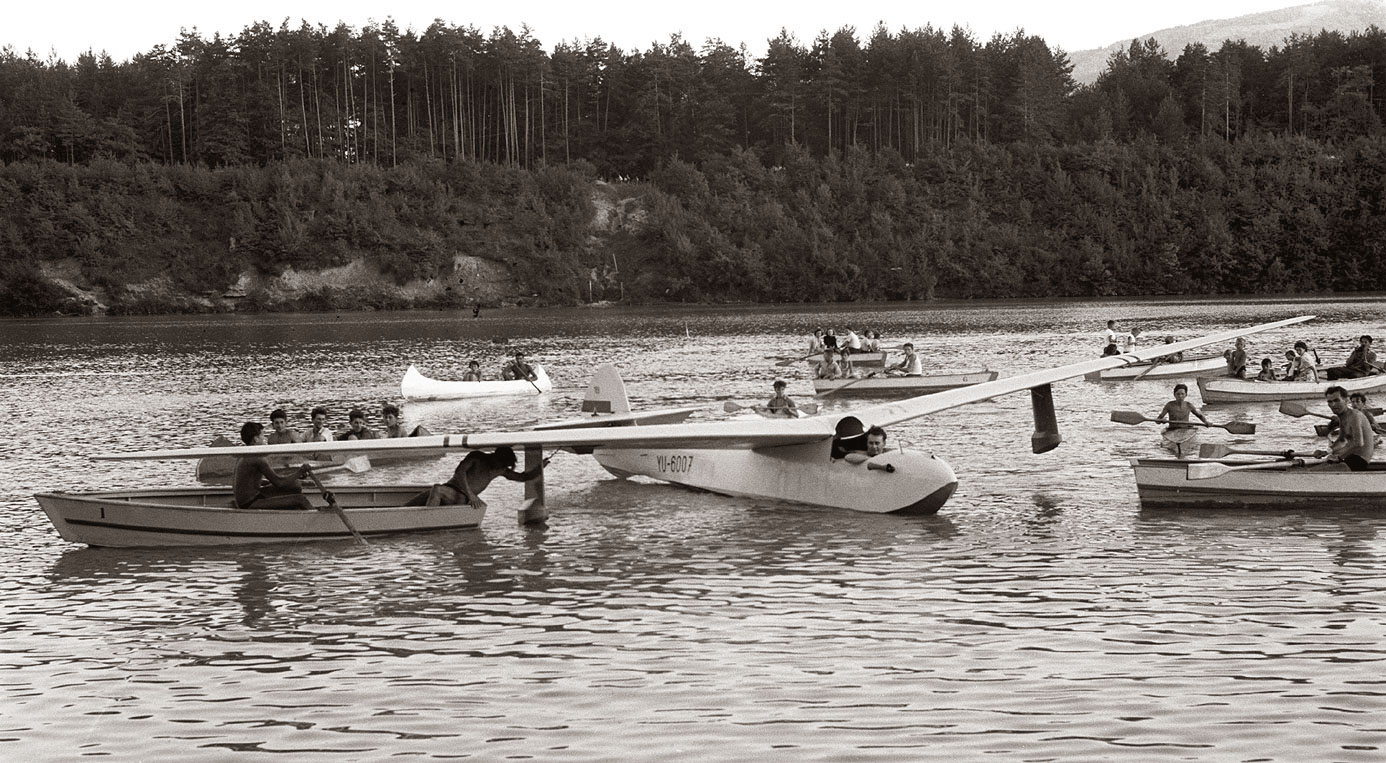

General information
- Type: Amphibious sailplane
- National origin: Yugoslavia
- Manufacturer: LIBIS aircraft
- Designer: Jaroslav Košer

History
- First flight: 1949-50

The Koser KB-3 Jadran was a Slovenian amphibious sailplane designed and produced by LIBIS aircraft during Yugoslavian period. It was designed by Jaroslav Košer, a student at the Ljubljana Technical Faculty (Tehniška fakulteta v Ljubljani) of the University of Ljubljana and was a development of his earlier Koser-Hrovat KB-1 Triglav design.

== Specifications ==
Data from The World's sailplanes

General characteristics

- Crew: one
- Wingspan: 15.0 m (49 ft 3 in)
- Wing area: 13.25 m^{2} (142.6 sq ft)
- Aspect ratio: 17
- Airfoil: Göttingen Gö 549
- Empty weight: 195 kg (430 lb)
- Gross weight: 280 kg (617 lb) maximum

Performance

- Maximum speed: 200 km/h (120 mph, 110 kn) placard
- Maximum glide ratio: 25 at 75 km/h (47 mph; 40 kn)
- Rate of sink: 0.75 m/s (148 ft/min) minimum, 60 km/h (37 mph; 32 kn)
- Aerotow maximum speed: 150 km/h (93 mph; 81 kn)
