= Kronach (White Main) =

River in Bavaria, Germany

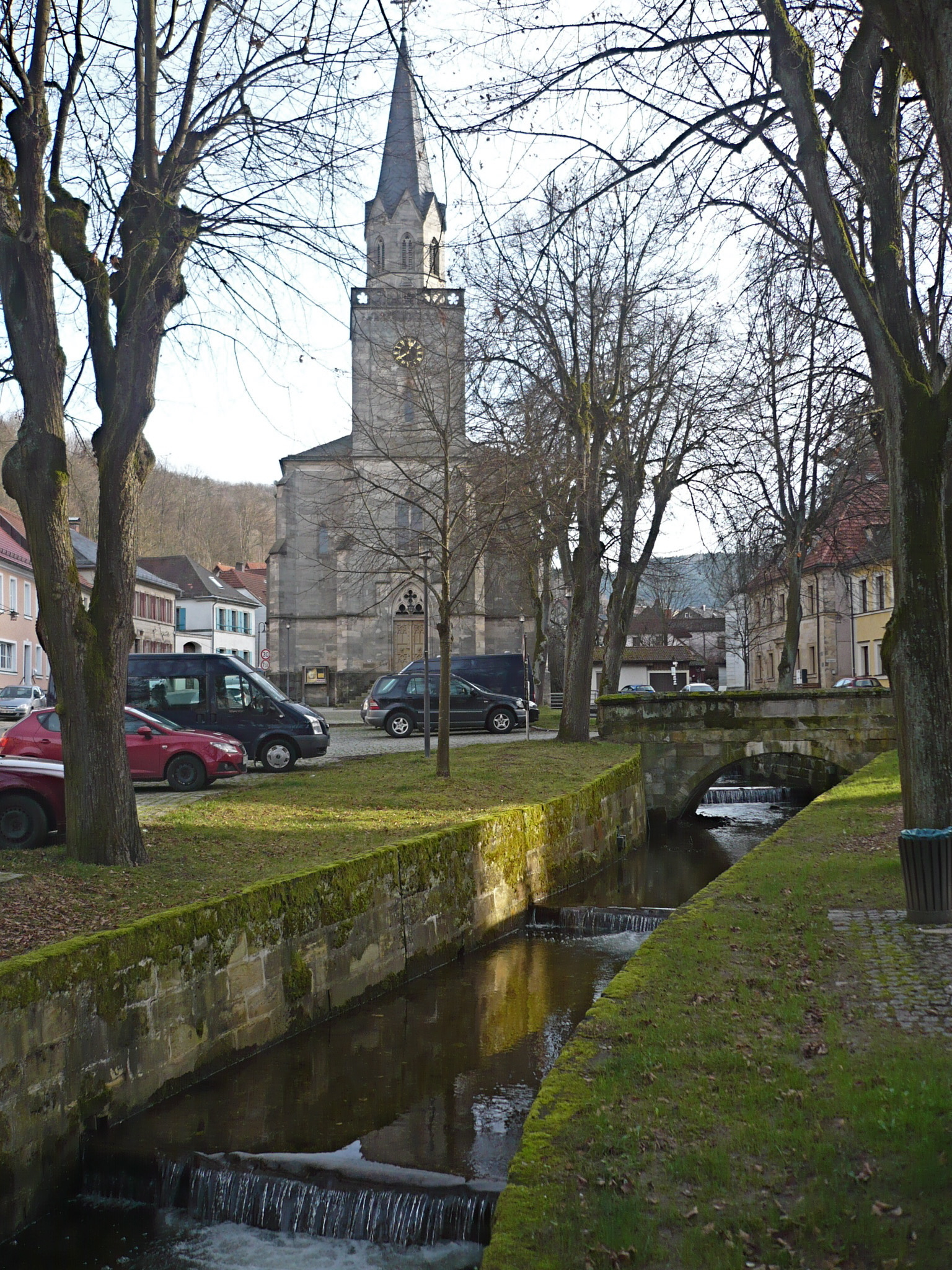
- The Kronach in Goldkronach

Location
- Country: Germany
- State: Bavaria

Physical characteristics
- Mouth
  - location: White Main
  - coordinates: 50.0451°N 11.6076°E
- Length: 14.3 km (8.9 mi)

Basin features
- Progression: White Main→ Main→ Rhine→ North Sea

Kronach (German pronunciation: [ˈkʁoːnax]) is a river of Bavaria, Germany. It is a left tributary of the White Main near Himmelkron.

== See also ==
- List of rivers of Bavaria
