= Ölschnitz (Red Main) =

River in Germany

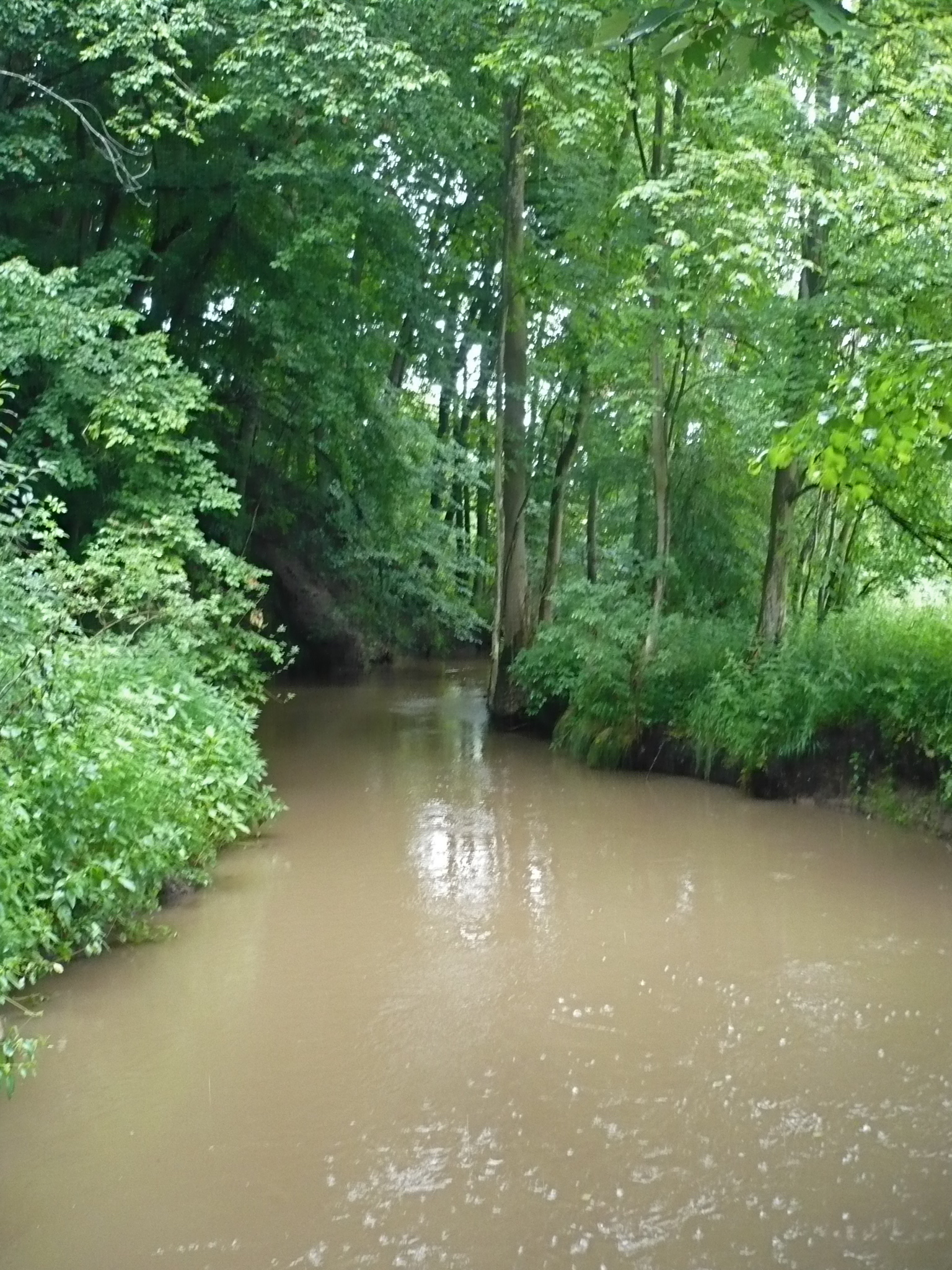
- The Ölschnitz at Bühl, a part of Emtmannsberg

Location
- Country: Germany
- State: Bavaria
- Location: Upper Franconia
- Reference no.: DE: 24122

Physical characteristics
- Source
  - location: start: confluence of the Laimbach and Bieberswöhrbach near Emtmannsberg-Unterölschnitz
  - coordinates: 49°52′33″N 11°40′25″E
  - elevation: ca. 381 m above sea level (NN)
- Mouth
  - location: near Weidenberg-Neunkirchen into the Red Main
  - coordinates: 49°55′14″N 11°38′17″E
  - elevation: ca. 358 m above sea level (NN)
- Length: 18.5 km (11.5 mi)

Basin features
- Progression: Red Main→ Main→ Rhine→ North Sea

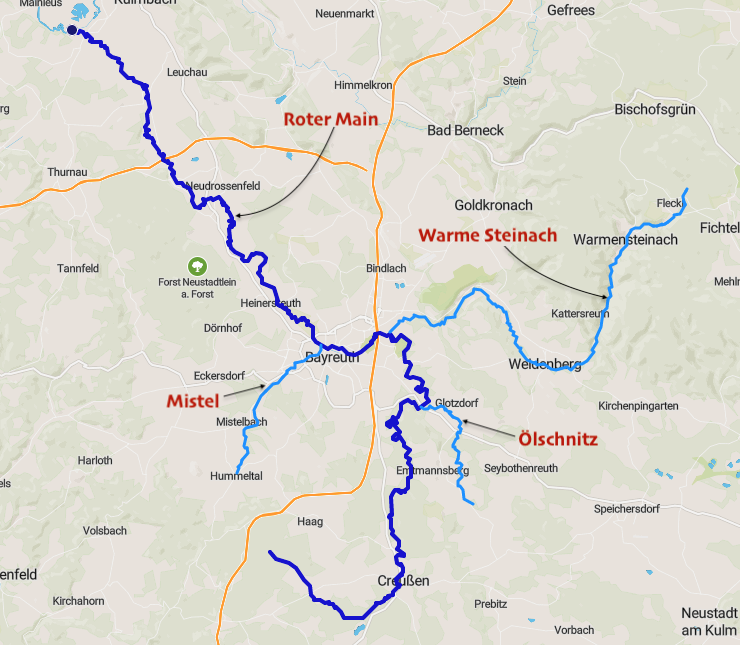

The Ölschnitz is right-bank, southeastern headstream of the Red Main in the German province of Upper Franconia in Bavaria. It is 8.8 kilometres (5.5 mi) long, and including its source river Laimbach 18.5 km (11.5 mi).

== Course ==
The Ölschnitz starts at the confluence of the Laimbach and Bieberswöhrbach streams near Emtmannsberg-Unterölschnitz and discharges into the Red Main near Weidenberg-Neunkirchen.

== Places ==
The Ölschnitz flows through the following places:

- Unterölschnitz
- Hauendorf
- Lehen
- Stockau
- Neunkirchen

== Tributaries ==
- Oberölschnitzer Bach (left)
- Lainbach (right)
- Würgersbach (right)
- Mühlbach (right)

== See also ==
- List of rivers of Bavaria
