= Warme Steinach =

River in Germany

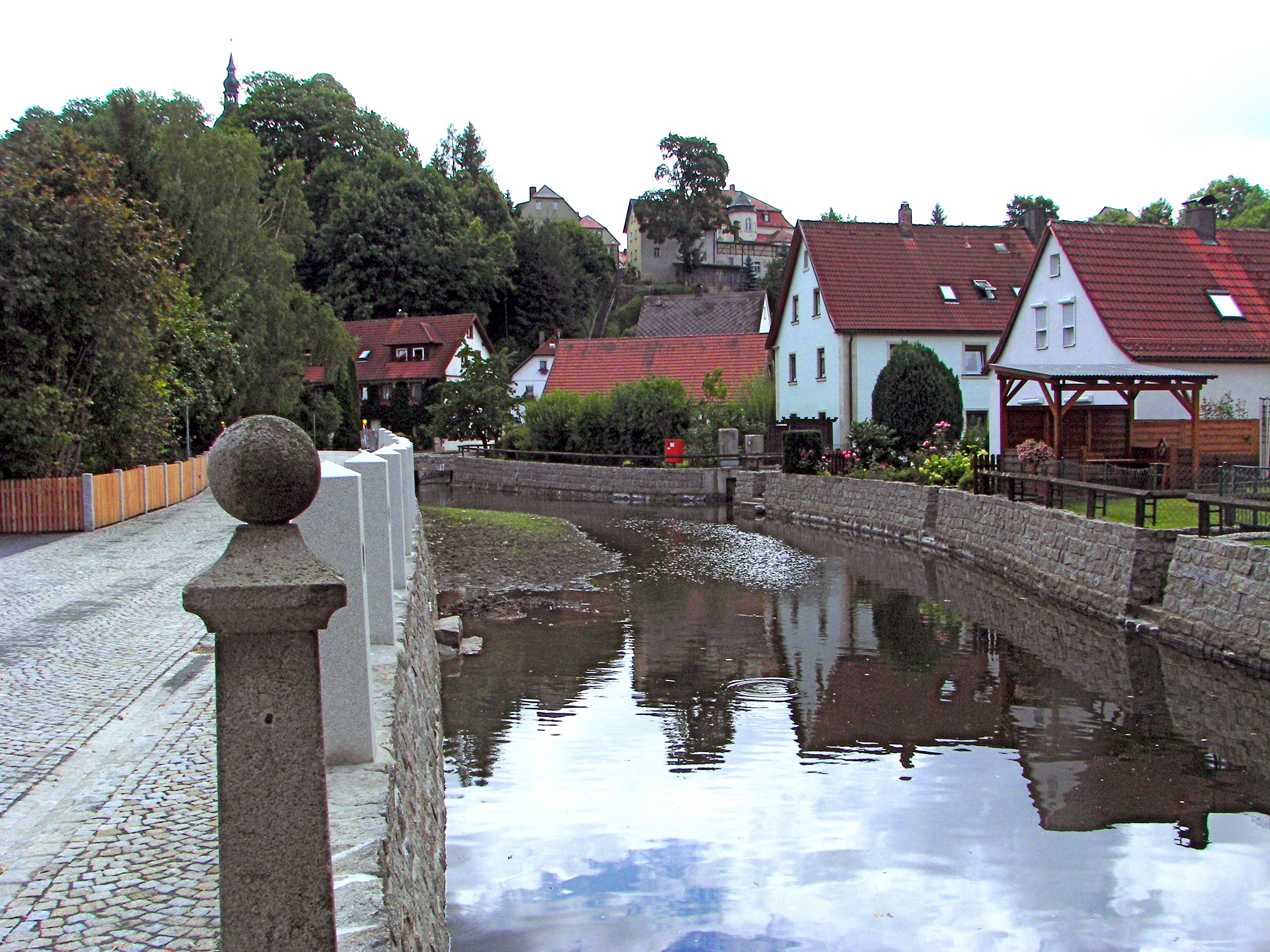

Location
- Country: Germany
- State: Bavaria

Physical characteristics
- Mouth
  - location: Red Main
  - coordinates: 49.9529°N 11.6158°E
- Length: 28.1 km (17.5 mi)

Basin features
- Progression: Red Main→ Main→ Rhine→ North Sea

Warme Steinach is a river of Bavaria, Germany. It flows into the Red Main east of Bayreuth.

== See also ==
- List of rivers of Bavaria
