= Steinach (Nürtingen) =

River in Baden-Württemberg, Germany

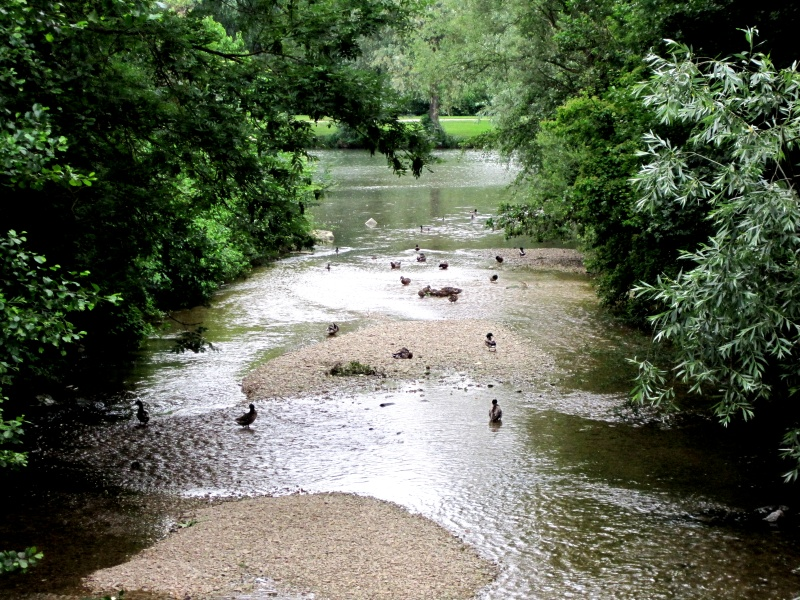

Location
- Country: Germany
- State: Baden-Württemberg

Physical characteristics
- Mouth
  - location: Neckar
  - coordinates: 48°37′33″N 9°19′59″E
- Length: 13.2 km (8.2 mi)

Basin features
- Progression: Neckar→ Rhine→ North Sea

Steinach (German pronunciation: [ˈʃtaɪnax]) is a river of Baden-Württemberg, Germany. It passes through Neuffen and flows into the Neckar in Nürtingen.

== See also ==
- List of rivers of Baden-Württemberg
