= Veldenstein Forest =

Coordinates: 49°41′4″N 11°31′9″E

Location of the Veldenstein Forest in the district of Bayreuth

The Veldenstein Forest (German: Veldensteiner Forst) lies in the east of the Franconian Switzerland-Veldenstein Forest Nature Park between the towns of Pegnitz and Plech.

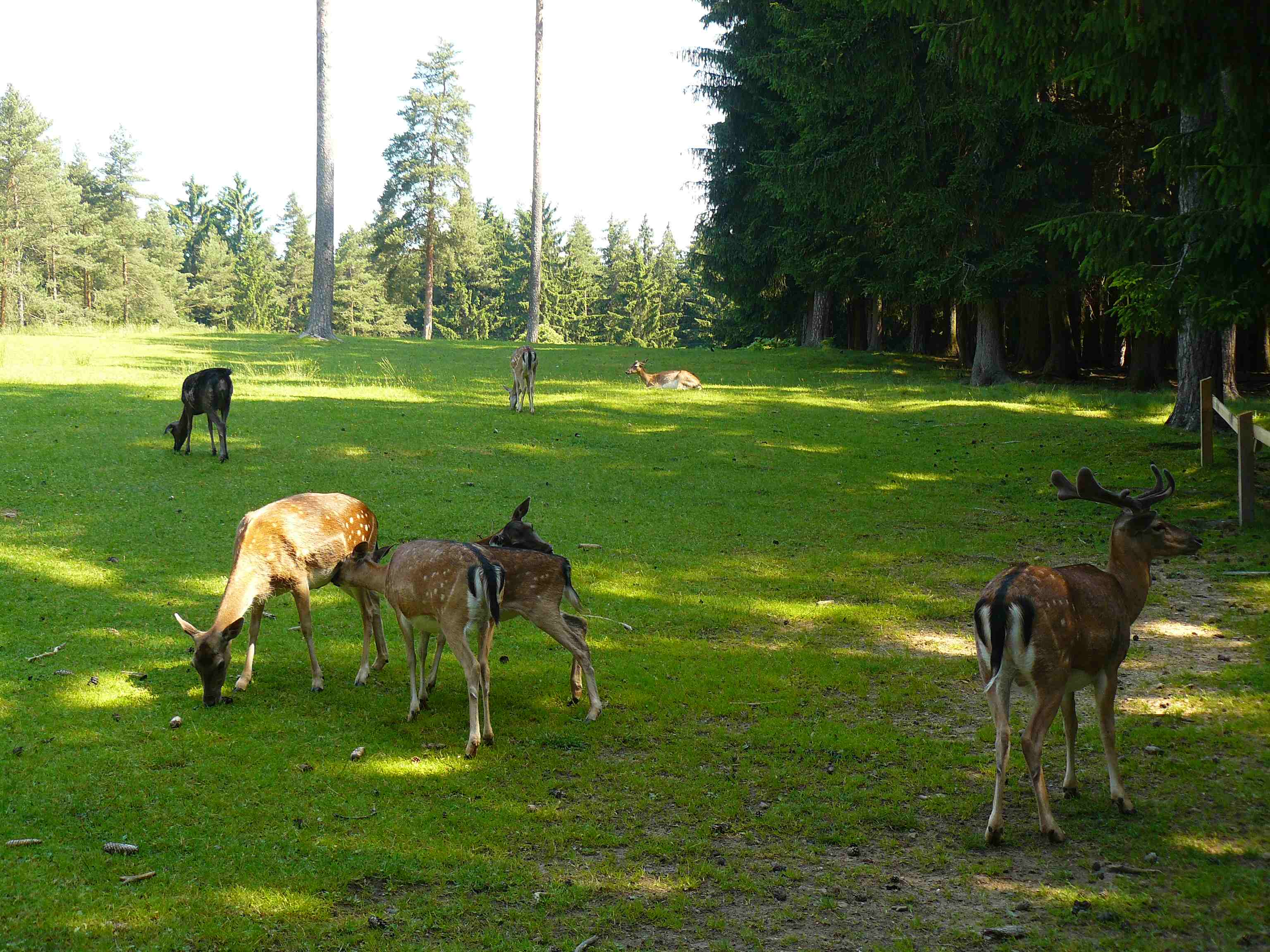
Fallow deer in the Veldenstein Forest Wildlife Park

Its name is derived from Veldenstein Castle, a large, well preserved, medieval fortification above Neuhaus an der Pegnitz. The Veldenstein Forest, with its extensive pine and spruce woods has an area of around 70 km^{2} and is one of the largest contiguous areas of forest in Bavaria. A large part of the Veldenstein Forest lies on the territory of the district of Bayreuth and forms the fourth largest unincorporated area in Bavaria (55.60 km^{2}).

== Sights ==
A particular attraction in the Veldenstein Forest is the wildlife park. In the east the nature reserve of Pegnitzau zwischen Ranna und Michelfeld borders immediately on the forest. The forest also has numerous rock formations, caves and dolines, some of which are classified as natural monuments or geotopes.

== Literature ==
- Stephan Lang: Höhlen in Franken - Ein Wanderführer in die Unterwelt der Hersbrucker Schweiz und des Oberpfälzer Jura. Verlag Hans Carl, Nuremberg, 2006, ISBN 3-418-00390-7, pp. 36–38.
