= Koser-Hrovat KB-1 Triglav =

KB-1 Triglav

General information
- Type: Sailplane
- National origin: Slovenia
- Manufacturer: LIBIS aircraft (Letalski inštitut Branko Ivanuš Slovenija)

History
- First flight: 1948

Triglav was a Slovenian sailplane, designed and produced by LIBIS aircraft during Yugoslavian period.

It was designed by Jaroslav Košer and Stojan Hrovat, then students of the Ljubljana Technical Faculty (Tehniška fakulteta v Ljubljani) of the University of Ljubljana. The first flight was in 1948. The detailed description was published in the Yugoslavian aviation magazine Narodna Krila (People's Wings) in 1949.

The goal of the design team was to create the new Olympic glider for OSTIV (Organisation Scientifique et Technique du Vol à Voile), in competition with the DFS Meise (which won), amongst others.

== Specifications ==
Data from

General characteristics

- Crew: 1
- Length: 6.83 m (22 ft 5 in)
- Wingspan: 15.0 m (49 ft 3 in)
- Height: 1.2 m (3 ft 11 in)
- Wing area: 13.25 m^{2} (142.6 sq ft)
- Aspect ratio: 17
- Airfoil: root Göttingen 549 16%, tip NACA M6
- Empty weight: 212 kg (467 lb)
- Gross weight: 265 kg (584 lb)
- Max takeoff weight: 302 kg (666 lb)

Performance

- Stall speed: 42 km/h (26 mph, 23 kn)
- Never exceed speed: 300 km/h (190 mph, 160 kn)
- g limits: +12 -10
- Maximum glide ratio: 1:27 at 75 km/h (40 kn; 47 mph)
- Rate of sink: 0.67 m/s (132 ft/min) at 62 km/h (33 kn; 39 mph)
- Wing loading: 20 kg/m^{2} (4.1 lb/sq ft)
