= Trebgast (White Main) =

River in Germany

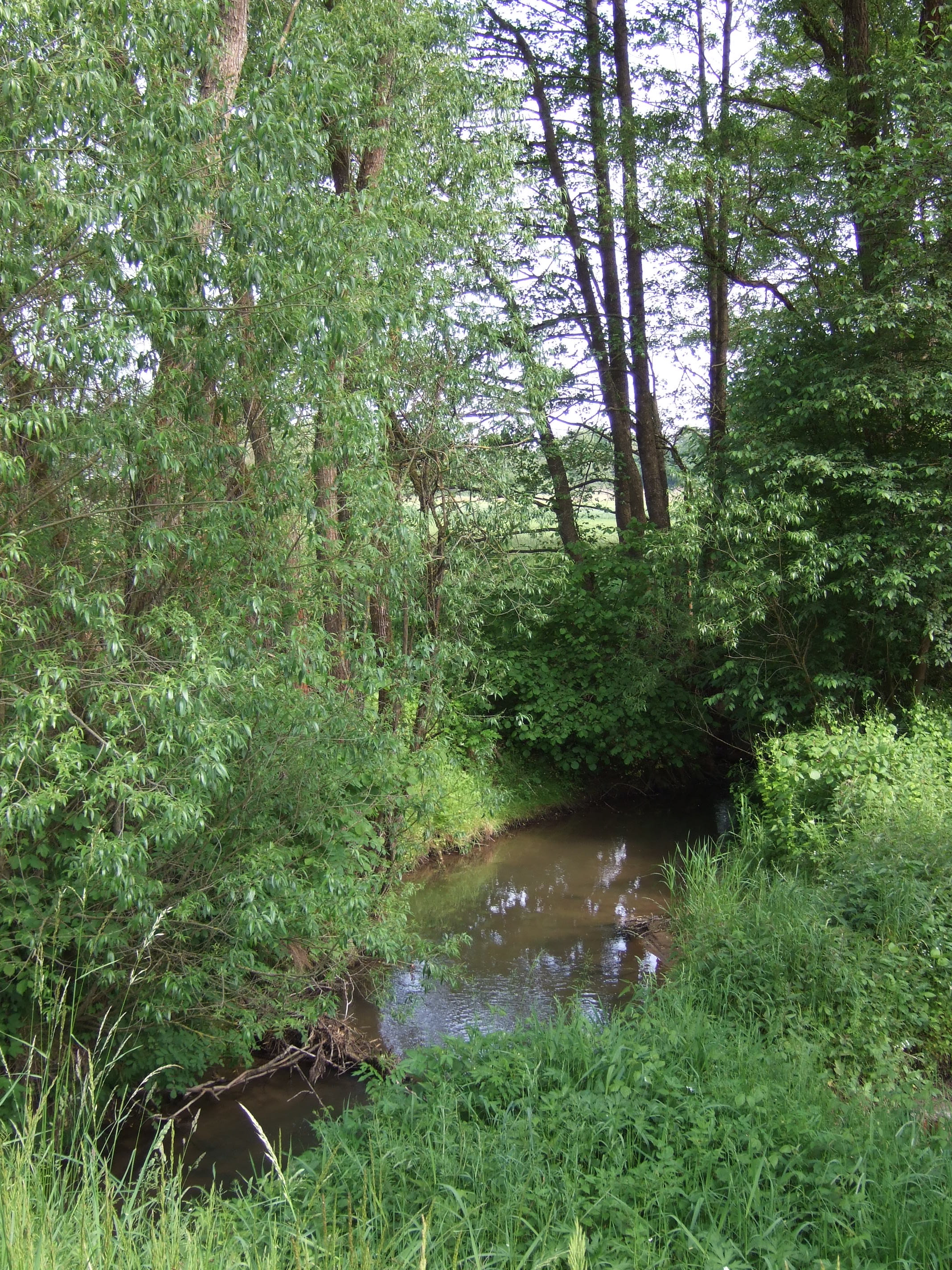
- The Trebgast at Harsdorf

Location
- Country: Germany
- State: Bavaria

Physical characteristics
- Mouth
  - location: White Main
  - coordinates: 50.0714°N 11.5520°E
- Length: 17.7 km (11.0 mi)

Basin features
- Progression: White Main→ Main→ Rhine→ North Sea

Trebgast is a river of Bavaria, Germany. It is a left tributary of the White Main near the village Trebgast.

== See also ==
- List of rivers of Bavaria
