= Wirsberg =

- Municipality
- Coat of arms

- Location of Wirsberg within Kulmbach district
- Interactive map of Wirsberg
- Location within Germany Location within Bavaria
- Coordinates: 50°7′N 11°35′E
- Country: Germany
- State: Bavaria
- Admin. region: Oberfranken
- District: Kulmbach
- Subdivisions: 10 Ortsteile

Government
  - Mayor (2020–26): Jochen Trier

Area
  - Total: 17.21 km^{2} (6.64 sq mi)
- Elevation: 370 m (1,210 ft)

Population (2025-12-31)
  - Total: 1,900
  - Density: 110/km^{2} (290/sq mi)
- Time zone: UTC+01:00 (CET)
  - Summer (DST): UTC+02:00 (CEST)
- Postal codes: 95339
- Dialling codes: 09227
- Vehicle registration: KU
- Website: www.wirsberg.de

Wirsberg is a municipality in the district of Kulmbach in Bavaria in Germany.

== City arrangement ==
Wirsberg is arranged in the following boroughs:

- Birkenhof
- Cottenau
- Einöde
- Goldene Adlerhütte
- Neufang
- Osserich
- Schlackenmühle
- Sessenreuth
- Weißenbach
- Wirsberg

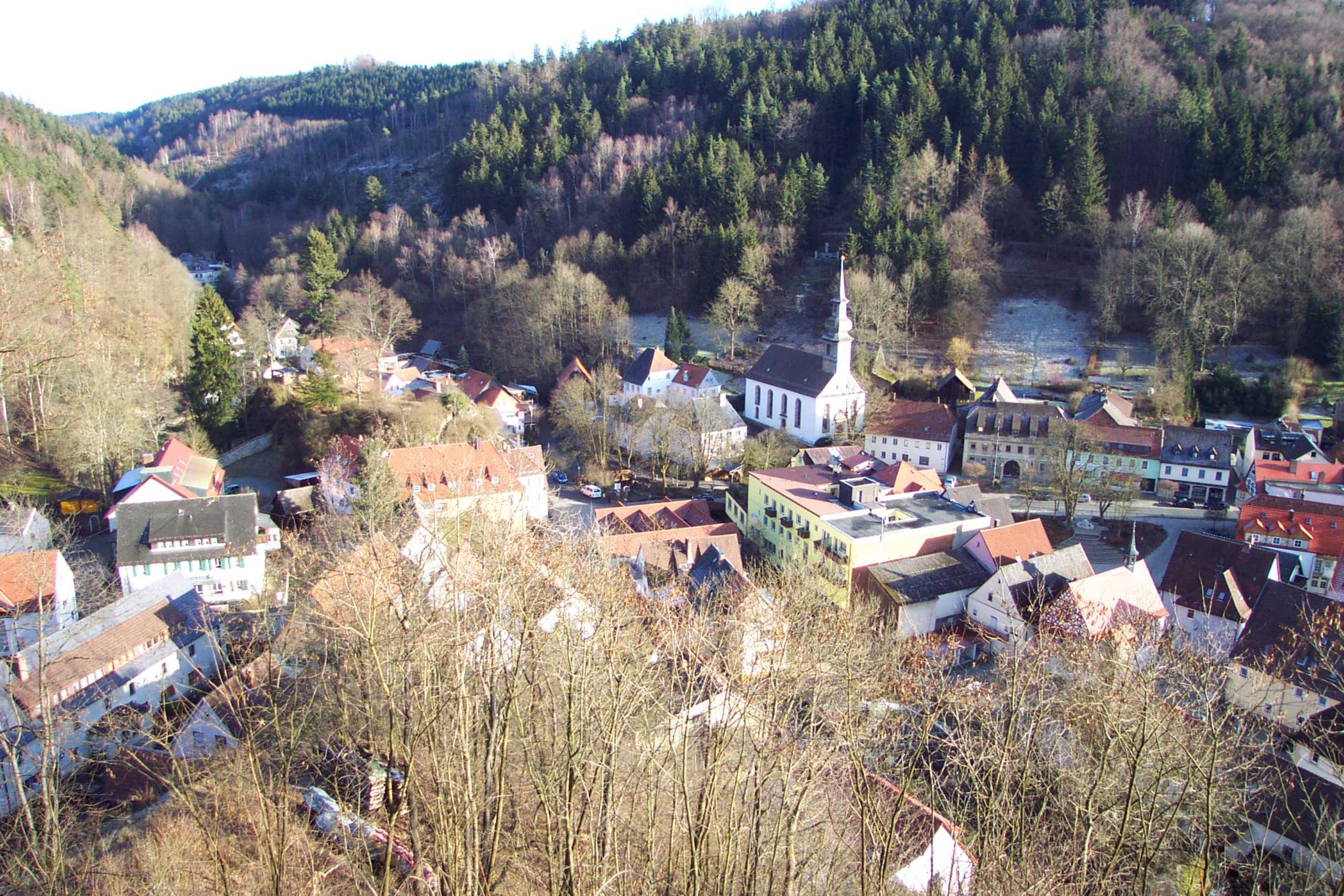
View from emperors monument to Wirsberg
