= Heinersreuth =

- Municipality
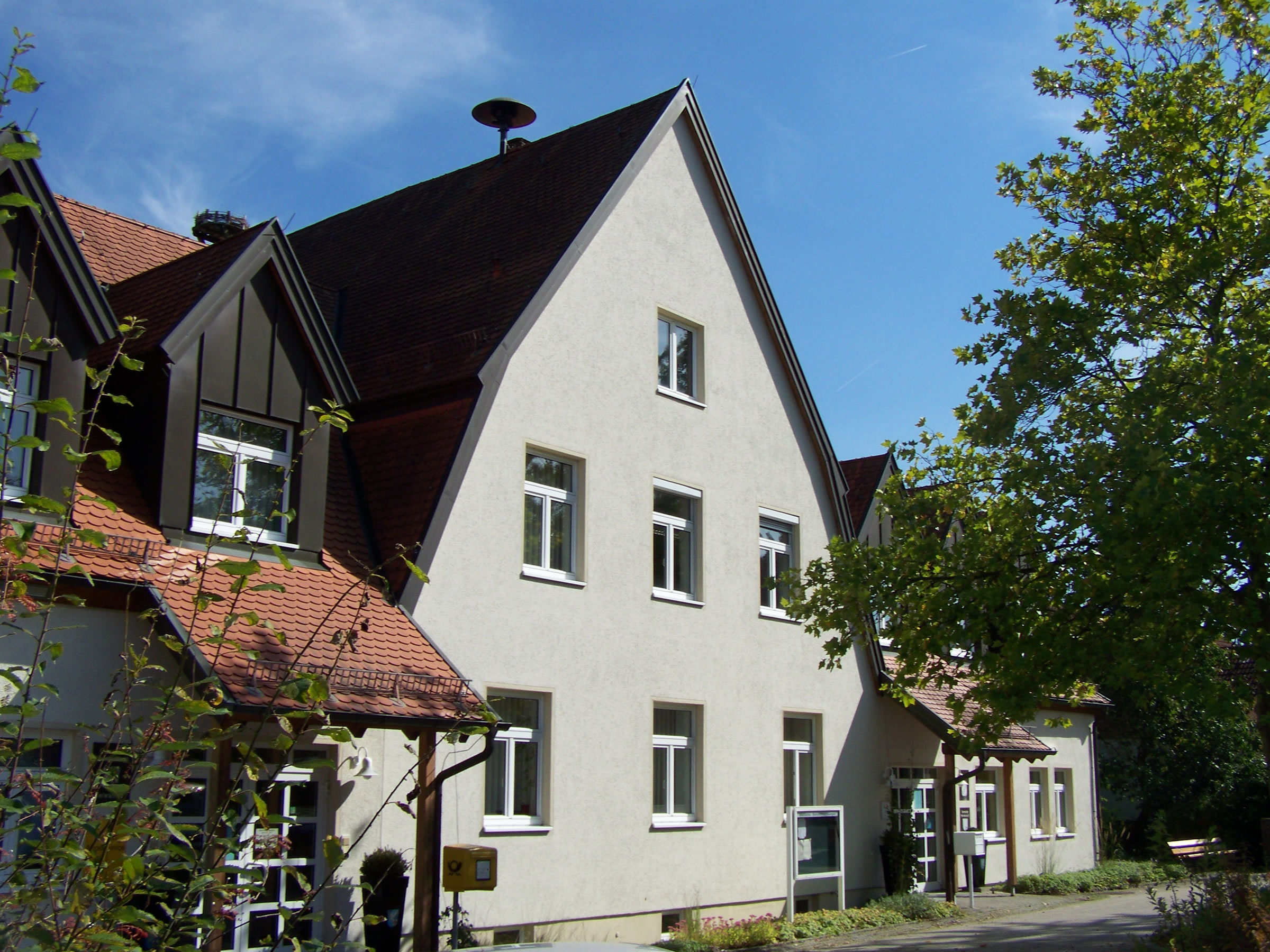
- Town hall

- Coat of arms

- Location of Heinersreuth within Bayreuth district
- Interactive map of Heinersreuth
- Location within Germany Location within Bavaria
- Coordinates: 49°58′4.54″N 11°31′54.82″E
- Country: Germany
- State: Bavaria
- Admin. region: Oberfranken
- District: Bayreuth
- Subdivisions: 18 Ortsteile

Government
  - Mayor (2020–26): Simone Kirschner (CSU)

Area
  - Total: 14.63 km^{2} (5.65 sq mi)
- Elevation: 340 m (1,120 ft)

Population (2025-12-31)
  - Total: 3,703
  - Density: 253.1/km^{2} (655.6/sq mi)
- Time zone: UTC+01:00 (CET)
  - Summer (DST): UTC+02:00 (CEST)
- Postal codes: 95500
- Dialling codes: 0921
- Vehicle registration: BT
- Website: www.heinersreuth.de

Heinersreuth is a municipality in the district of Bayreuth in Bavaria in Germany.

== People ==
- Rolf Schmidt-Holtz (born 1948), German businessman and journalist
