= White Main =

River in Germany

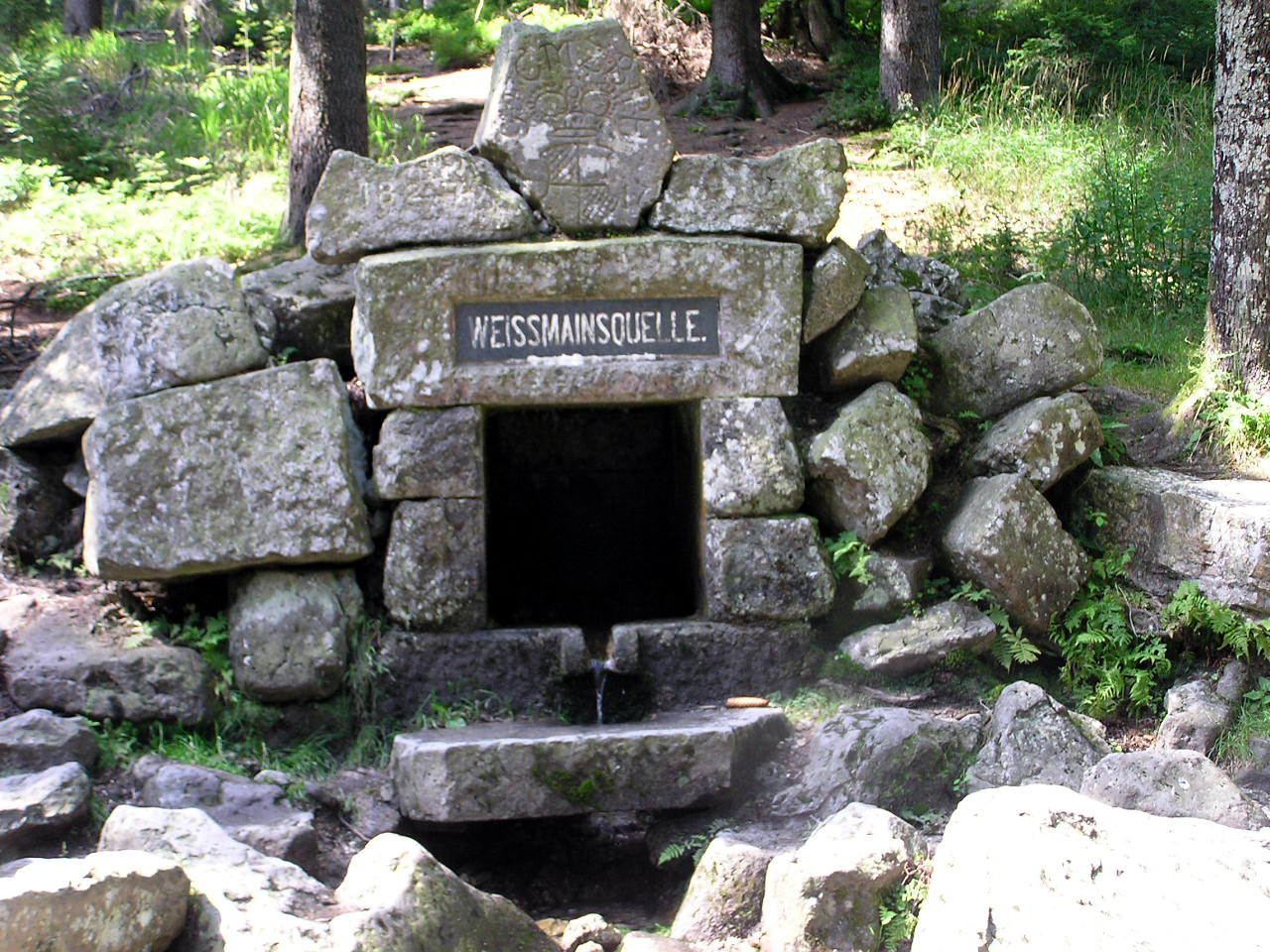
- Source of the White Main

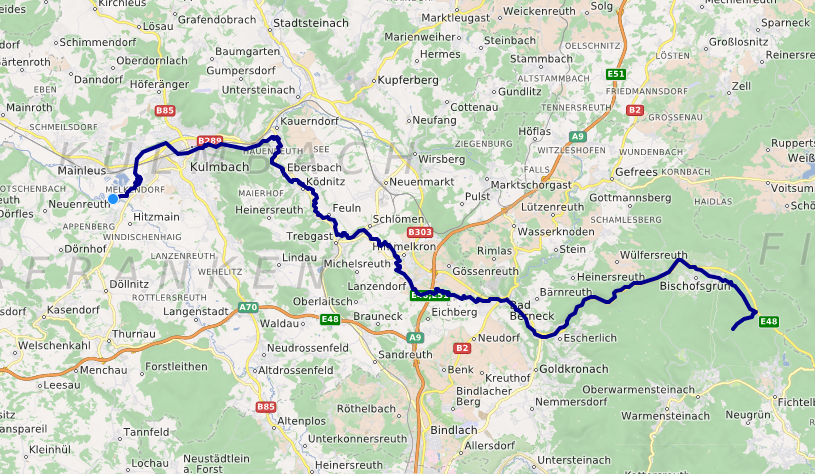
- Course of the White Main (interactive map)

Location
- Country: Germany
- States: Bavaria (Upper Franconia)
- Reference no.: DE: 24

Physical characteristics
- Source
  - location: on the eastern slope of the Ochsenkopf in the Fichtel Mountains
  - coordinates: 50°01′47″N 11°49′26″E
  - elevation: 887 m above sea level (NN)
- Mouth
  - location: confluence: south of Kulmbach, near Steinenhausen Castle with the Red Main into the Main
  - coordinates: 50°05′13.65″N 11°23′51.21″E
  - elevation: 298 m above sea level (NN)
- Length: 51.7 km (32.1 mi)
- Basin size: 636 km^{2} (246 sq mi)
- Discharge
  - average: 8.4 m^{3}/s (300 cu ft/s)

Basin features
- Progression: Main→ Rhine→ North Sea

The White Main (German: Weißer Main or Weißmain, not to be confused with the Weismain), is the larger and shorter of the two headstreams of the river Main. It rises in the Fichtel Mountains and merges near Steinenhausen, southwest of Kulmbach, with the left-hand, southern headstream, the Red Main, to form the Main. The length of the White Main is 51.7 km. The source of the White Main lies on light granite rock, which lends it its white colouration.

== Sources ==
The source of the White Main is a wellspring located at 887 m above NN on the eastern slope of the Ochsenkopf. Margrave Frederick fixed it and had it enclosed in granite blocks in 1717. He also had the Hohenzollern coat-of-arms carved into the granite. Johann Wolfgang von Goethe visited the spring in 1785, but reckoned the Seehausbrunnen southeast of the Schneeberg as the source of the Main, for he wrote: "...the source of the Main, which rises close to the house here and where the stream here amounts to a no more than a tin washtub, ...".

Although the Red Main is a few kilometres longer, the source of the larger White Main is seen as that of the Main.

== Course ==
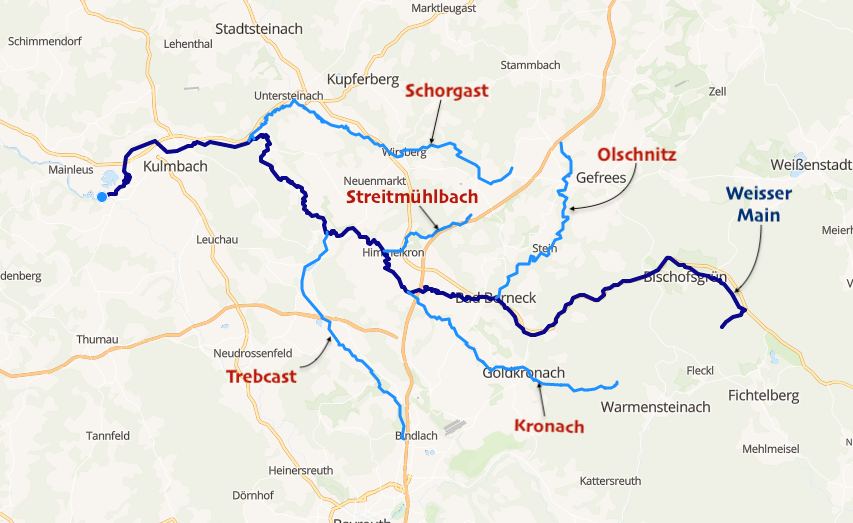
The White Main and its main tributaries

Initially, the White Main flows steeply downhill towards the northeast. After about 1.4 km (0.9 mi) it feeds a small lake near Karches in the municipality of Bischofsgrün. Shortly thereafter, it changes direction abruptly to the northwest and cuts its way through a narrow valley. Just before Fröbershammer it leaves the granite of the central massif. Near Fröbershammer it meets the Kroppenbach which enters from the right. Near Rangen it turns towards the southwest and flows through a very, narrow, wild, scenic gorge. At the far end it reaches a mill, the Glasermühle, where it is joined from the left by the Brombergsbach and, shortly thereafter, by the Lützelmain, also known as the Lützelmainbach. After that it also picks up the little Steinbach. Near Bad Berneck-Schmelz the Schmelzbach and the Zoppatenbach enter it from the left. The White Main now turns northwest, passes through the village of Frankenhammer before reaching Bad Berneck. Here it is joined from the right by the Ölschnitz and the Rimlasgrundbach. It then passes north of Blumenau, where it merges with the Obere Wiesenbächlein and, immediately afterwards, the Untere Wiesenbächlein, from the left-hand side.

Near Kremitz it meets the left-hand tributary of the Kronach coming from the southeast. It passes through Lanzendorf und Himmelkron, where it is met from the right by the Streitmühlbach, near Neuenmarkt-Schlömen and then the Laubenbach. Next it alters course towards the west, until it reaches Trebgast, where it picks up the stream of the same name coming from the south. It then swings northwest and flows past Feuln, collecting the waters of the Feulnerbach; then the Veitsgraben near Ködnitz and the Mühlgraben. It travels through Fölschnitz and Kauerndorf, where it is joined by the Schorgast. It now runs in a southwesterly direction past Aichig, where it is fed by the Teufelsgraben, and enters Kulmbach. There it is met by the Purbach and the Dobrach from the right and the Kinzelsbach from the left. At the western edge of Kulmbach, near Steinhausen Castle, the White Main finally merges with the Red Main to form the River Main.

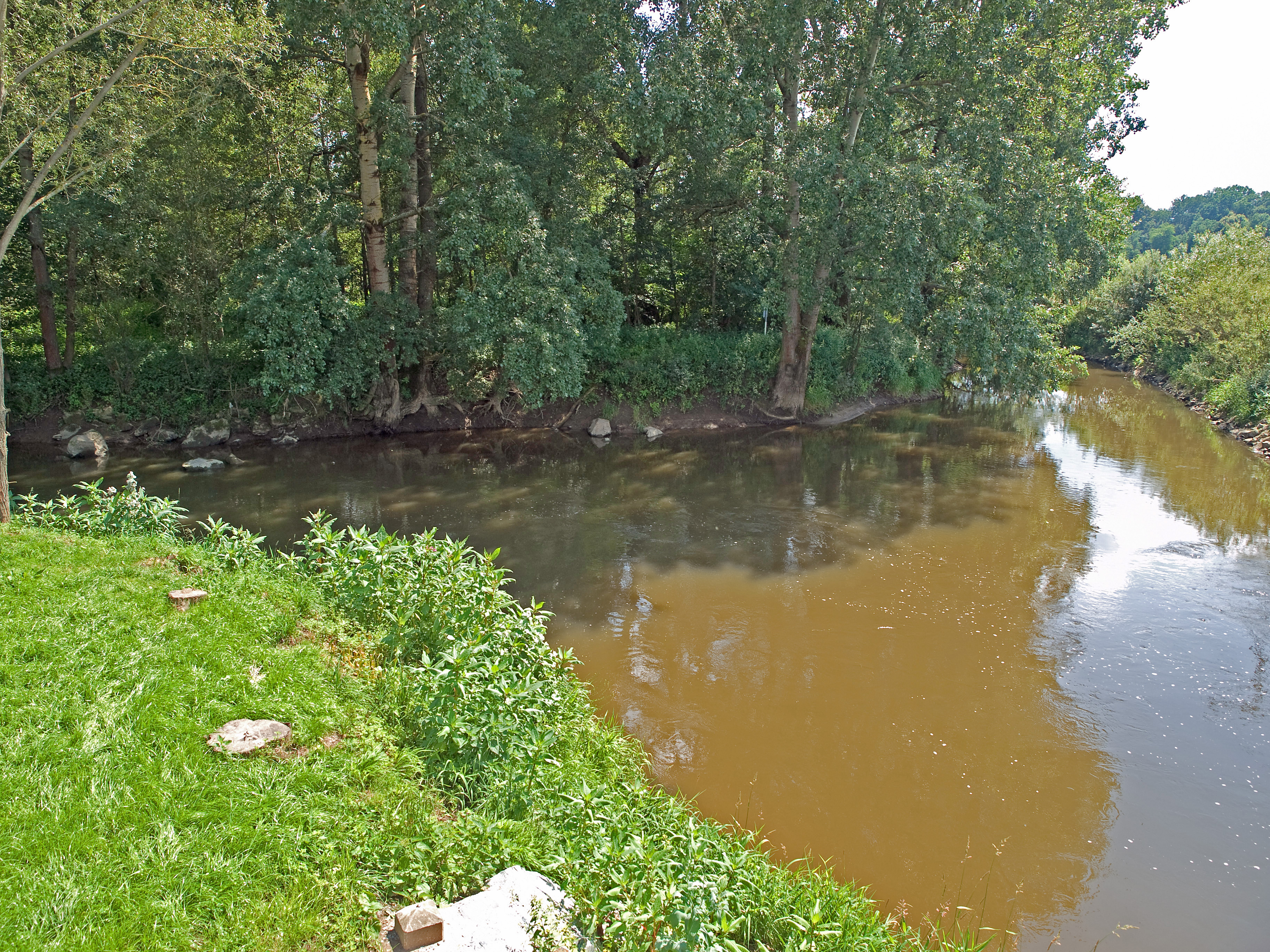
The confluence of the Red und White Main near Kulmbach

== Fauna ==
The White Main is home to the eel, grayling, brown trout, brook trout, barbel, perch, carp bream, pike, carp, rainbow trout, roach, rudd and tench.

== Geography ==
=== Tributaries ===
- Paschenbach (right)
- Kroppenbach (right)
- Brommbergsbach (left)
- Lützelmain (left)
- Steinbach (left)
- Schmelzbach (left)
- Zoppatenbach (left)
- Ölschnitz (right)
- Rimlasgrundbach (right)
- Oberes Wiesenbächlein (left)
- Unteres Wiesenbächlein (left)
- Kronach (left)
- Streitmühlbach (right)
- Laubenbach (right)
- Trebgast (left)
- Feulner Bach (right)
- Veitsgraben (left)
- Mühlgraben (left)
- Schorgast (right)
- Teufelsgraben (right)
- Purbach (right)
- Dobrach (right)
- Kinzelsbach (left)

=== Towns on its banks ===
- Bad Berneck
- Kulmbach

== See also ==
- List of rivers of Bavaria

== Sources ==
Bogner, Franz X. (2006). Der Obermain. Ein Luftbildporträt von Bayreuth bis Bamberg. Ellwanger-Verlag, Bayreuth, 2006. ISBN 3-925361-57-X
