= Neubürg =

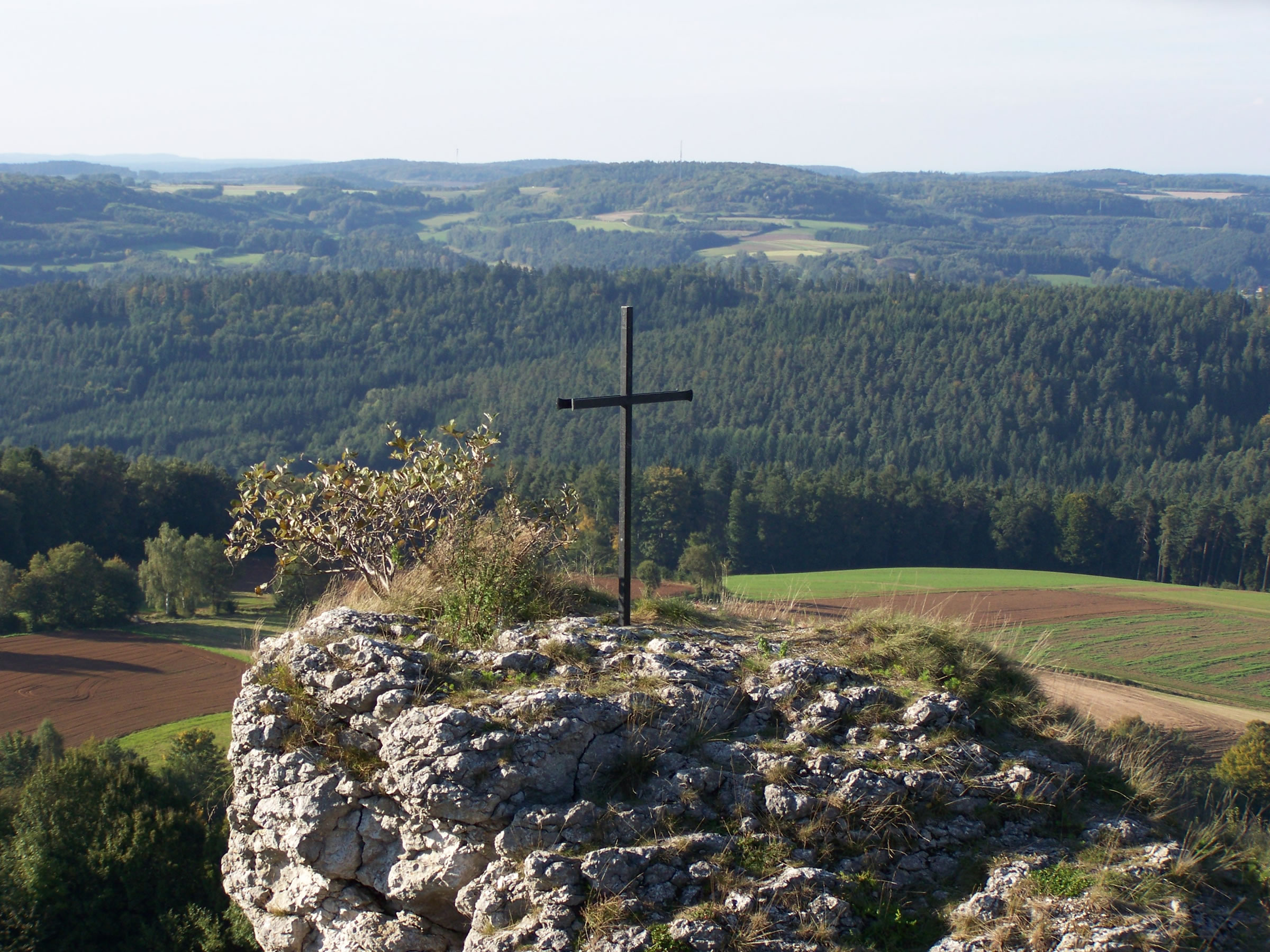
- Cross on a rocky outcrop of the Neubürg

Highest point
- Elevation: 586.8 m (1,925 ft)
- Coordinates: 49°53′N 11°24′E

Geography
- Location within Bavaria
- Location: Mistelgau, Bayreuth district, Bavaria, Germany

The Neubürg is a table hill in Mistelgau, Germany. It is part of the Franconian Jura and Franconian Switzerland.

== Geography ==
The Neubürg is a so-called "Zeugenberg" (outlier mountain) located on the eastern edge of the Franconian Jura, 5 km southwest of the village of Mistelgau. The small village Wohnsgehaig (part of Mistelgau municipality) is located on the western slopes of Neubürg.

== Geology ==
The Neubürg was created in the Jurassic era. The top layer consists of lime, followed by clay and iron-rich sandstone.

== History ==
Likely, the hilltop was first settled during Paleolithic around 12,000 BCE.

From the Neolithic period up to the La Tène period, a fortified settlement existed on the hilltop plateau. For this reason, today, this plateau is a protected archeological monument.

During the Middle Ages and until 1415, a castle atop the hill secured the road Via imperialis that ran from Bamberg to Bayreuth (and then on towards Cheb).

In 1806, local residents cut down the oak wood atop the hill. Today, this gives visitors a panoramic view of the entire surrounding area from Fichtel Mountains and Bayreuth right up to the Bamberg area.

In 1999, the nearby municipalities or towns Aufseß, Eckersdorf, Gesees, Glashütten, Hollfeld, Hummeltal, Mistelbach, Mistelgau, Plankenfels, and Waischenfeld, together with other agents, created the development association Förderverein Region Neubürg e. V. aimed at fostering tourism in the region.

Since 2003, the hill hosts the NaturKunstRaum Neubürg (literally Nature Art Room Neubürg), a permanent exhibit of various sculptures created by artists from Germany, France and Switzerland.
