= Mistelgau =

- Municipality
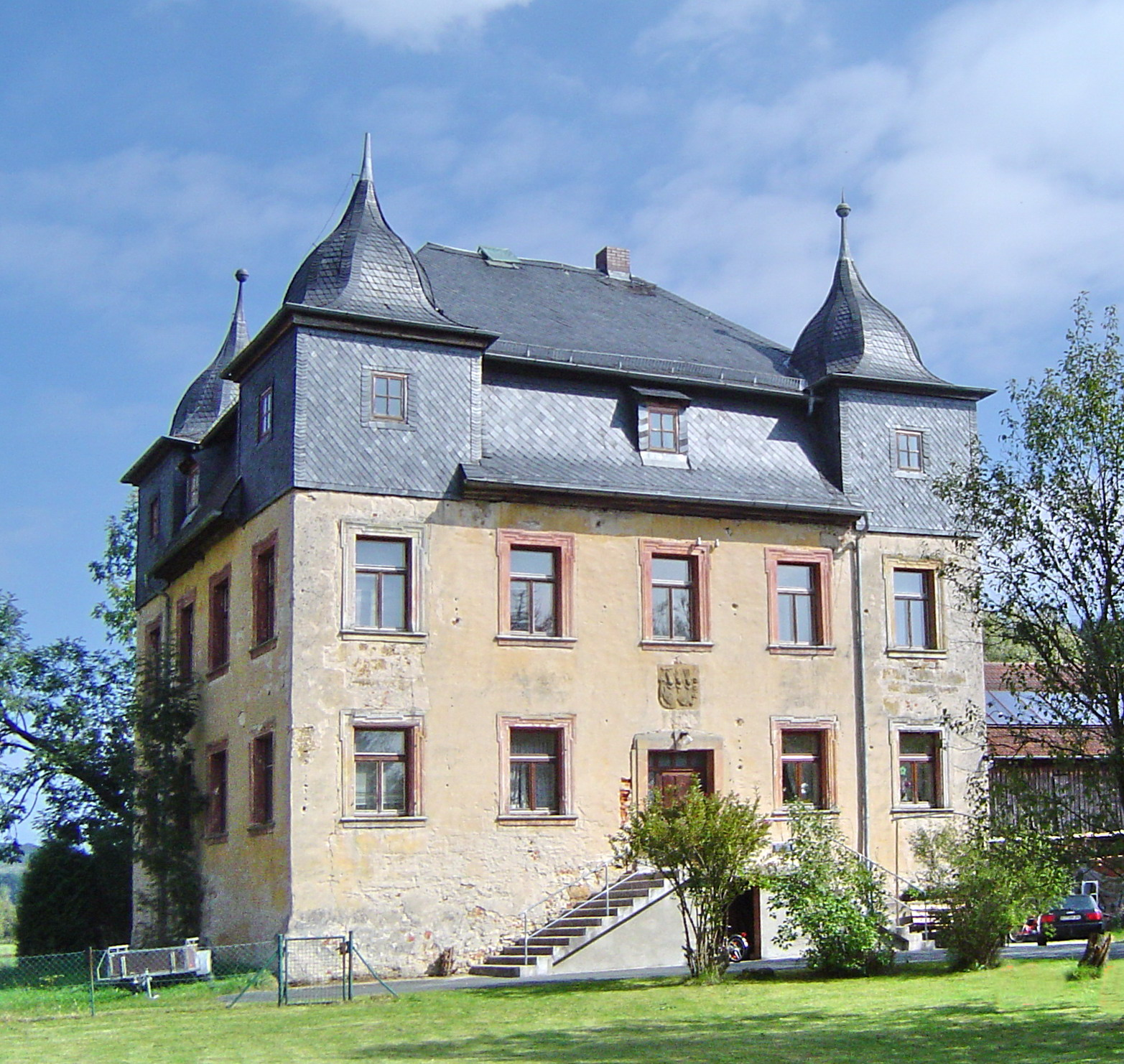
- Truppach Castle

- Coat of arms

- Location of Mistelgau within Bayreuth district
- Interactive map of Mistelgau
- Location within Germany Location within Bavaria
- Coordinates: 49°55′N 11°28′E
- Country: Germany
- State: Bavaria
- Admin. region: Oberfranken
- District: Bayreuth
- Municipal assoc.: Mistelgau
- Subdivisions: 42 Ortsteile

Government
  - Mayor (2020–26): Karl Lappe

Area
  - Total: 42.52 km^{2} (16.42 sq mi)
- Elevation: 435 m (1,427 ft)

Population (2025-12-31)
  - Total: 3,830
  - Density: 90.1/km^{2} (233/sq mi)
- Time zone: UTC+01:00 (CET)
  - Summer (DST): UTC+02:00 (CEST)
- Postal codes: 95490
- Dialling codes: 09279
- Vehicle registration: BT
- Website: www.mistelgau.de

Mistelgau is a municipality in the district of Bayreuth in Bavaria in Germany. The eponymous village is the seat of both the municipality as well as the municipality association Mistelgau.

== Name ==
The name "Mistelgau" is a compound of "Mistel" (German for mistletoe) and "Gau" (here: shire), possibly referring to the abundance of mistletoes in a nearby oak forest, which was cut down in 1780.

Today, mistletoes are not quite as common in the area as the name would suggest.

== Geography ==
=== Location ===
The main village Mistelgau is located 10 km to the west of Bayreuth. It is the centre of the so-called Hummelgau, the north-northeastern boundary of Franconian Switzerland and its transition into the Obermain foothills. The eastern part of the municipality is located on modestly hilly terrain used for agriculture, whereas the (south-)western parts are already part of the Franconian Switzerland with its steeper relief and wooded slopes. Roughly 5 km southwest of the main town, but still within the municipality, lies Neubürg, a table hill offering views of the surrounding area. To the east, the Red Main valley opens up, granting views of the Fichtel Mountains in the distance.

==== Neighbouring municipalities ====
Beginning in the north and continuing clockwise, Mistelgau shares borders with the following municipalities: Eckersdorf, Mistelbach, Hummeltal, Glashütten, Plankenfels, Hollfeld, and Thurnau.

=== Fossil pit ===
The Mistelgau fossil pit is considered one of the hundred most beautiful geotopes in Bavaria. Until 2005, the Mistelgau pit was used to mine clay for brick production.

It gained supraregional fame because of its impressive fossils. A “belemnite battlefield” and remains of dinosaurs make it one of the most important fossil sites in Europe. Some of the finds are exhibited at the Urwelt Museum Oberfranken in Bayreuthin.

The Bavarian State Office for the Environment has designated the pit as a valuable geotope (geotope number 472A016).

=== Subdivisions ===
The municipality consists of the following 42 districts: Äußerer Graben, Außerleithen, Bärnreuth, Böhnershof, Braunersberg, Culm (obere), Culm (untere), Engelmeß, Eschenmühle, Frankenhaag, Friedrichsruh, Geislareuth, Gollenbach, Göritzen, Gries, Hardt, Harloh, Hundshof, Kammer, Klingenmühle, Kreckenmühle, Laimen, Lenz, Mengersdorf, Mistelgau, Moosing, Obernsees, Ochsenholz, Pensenleithen, Plösen, Schnackenwöhr, Schobertsberg, Schobertsreuth, Schöchleins, Seitenbach, Sorg, Streit, Striegelhof, Tennig, Truppach, Wohnsgehaig.

== History ==
The area of the current municipality was first populated during the Stone Age: on top of the Neubürg, a fortified settlement existed between the Neolithic and the La Tène period.

During the Frankish Empire, around the year 700, peasants (Hummelbauern) from the Moselle and Middle Rhine regions settled in the area. Also, tumuli from the times of the Carolingian dynasty have been found.

Mistelgau proper is one of the older villages in the western part of Bayreuth district. Its first documentary mention was in 1379. From 1386 onwards, a noble family resided within the village.

In 1422, the characteristic church St. Bartholomäus was first mentioned.

Most historic sources were destroyed in the course of the Hussite (1433), German Peasants' (1525), Second Margrave (1552–55), Thirty Years' and Seven Years' Wars.

In 1634, more than half of the population died of the plague.

In 1791, Mistelgau along with the remaining Principality of Bayreuth was ceded to Prussia.

During the Napoleonic Wars, a part of the municipality served as a staging area for French artillery in a battle against the Austrians (1806). After the Treaties of Tilsit, Mistelgau was briefly under French control until the Kingdom of Bavaria purchased it alongside the remainder of the former Principality of Bayreuth. Since then, Mistelgau has been part of Bavaria.

In 1904, a railroad line from Bayreuth to Hollfeld (see main article: Bayreuth–Hollfeld railway) with a stop in the village of Mistelgau was opened. The village was electrified and a couple of manufacturing plants constructed.

A public school was created in 1964.

In 1972, several other formerly independent municipalities (Seitenbach, Engelmeß, Truppach, Mengersdorf, Frankenhaag, Plösen, Gollenbach, Wohnsgehaig) were incorporated into Mistelgau.

The railroad connection to Bayreuth and Hollfeld was discontinued in 1974. In the time since then, the tracks have been dismantled and the former railroad route has been converted into a road (in the direction of Obernsees) and a bike path (in the direction of Bayreuth, linking Mistelgau to Hummeltal).

In 1978, the hitherto independent Obernsees was incorporated into the municipality.

In 1980, the Catholic church St. Peter and Paul was opened.

The thermal bath Therme Obernsees was inaugurated in 1998.

In 2003, the permanent exhibit NaturKunstRaum Neubürg on top of the hill Neubürg was opened.
