= Truppach =

Truppach may refer to:

- Truppach (Mistelgau), a district of Mistelgau, Bavaria, Germany
- Truppach (Wiesent), a river of Bavaria, Germany, tributary of the Wiesent
