= Hans Max von Aufseß =

German writer (1905–1993)

Hans Max Baron von Aufseß (August 4, 1905, in Berchtesgaden – November 22, 1993) was a German writer who primarily published on topics related to the cultural history of Franconia. A great-nephew of Hans Baron von und zu Aufseß, the founder of the Germanic National Museum in Nuremberg, he lived and wrote at his castle, Oberaufseß, in Upper Franconia.

== Early life and education ==
Hans Max von Aufseß was the son of Lilli von Aufseß, née von Hofenfels, and Ministerialrat Ernst von Aufseß. He was also the great-nephew of Hans von Aufseß, the founder of the Germanic Museum in Nuremberg. He studied law and forestry, and passed the major state law examination.

== Career ==
He established himself as a lawyer in Naila by 1934.

During World War II, von Aufseß, who was fluent in French and English, worked in counterintelligence for the German occupation in Paris before being transferred in 1941 as a deputy—and in 1942 as the head—of the German civil administration on the British Channel Islands. The islands had been occupied by the Wehrmacht since the summer of 1940.

There is evidence that von Aufseß played a moderating role in his position, attempting to mediate between the British civilian population and the German occupiers to prevent abuses. However, it cannot be overlooked that he was part of an occupation regime that violated international law, employing forced laborers under inhumane conditions. Under his administration, in 1944, the artists Claude Cahun and Marcel Moore were arrested on the island of Jersey for using their art as a form of resistance against the Nazis. In his diaries, von Aufseß described them as belonging to an "unpleasant category" and noted that their house was "stuffed with hideous cubist paintings."

Despite this, some British citizens praised his conduct in office after the war. In May 1945, with the surrender of the German occupation forces on the Channel Islands, von Aufseß was taken as a British prisoner of war.

Von Aufseß was a Protestant and married Marilie von Klipstein in 1934, with whom he had three children: Uta, Cordula, and Michael. His wife, Marilie, was arrested by the Gestapo in August 1944 for making statements critical of the government.

In a manner typical of the German aristocracy, which combined snobbish disdain for Nazi upstarts with tacit agreement with their war aims and methods, von Aufseß wrote in his essay Nürnbergs Aufstieg aus Sand – und Asche (Nuremberg's Rise from Sand – and Ash):

"Thus, it can only be regretted as one of Hitler's many fatal errors that this presumptuous, greatest charlatan and half-educated man of all time, in desecration of the hospitality once granted to German emperors in Nuremberg, chose to hold his Reich Party Rallies and erect his monstrous buildings of boundless hubris there."

However, such post-1945 statements stand in contrast to his prior membership in the Nazi Party. According to records, von Aufseß joined the NSDAP on May 1, 1933 (membership number 2,524,705).

Though he was not a committed National Socialist, he shared some core assumptions of Nazi ideology until 1945. His party membership was likely an opportunistic move, as joining the party may have seemed necessary for a newly admitted lawyer at the start of his career.

From 1945 to 1947, he was interned in the British re-education camp Camp 18 (Featherstone Park) in northern England. The re-education efforts were successful in his case, and after 1945, he convincingly distanced himself from National Socialism. A critical reassessment of his activities on the Channel Islands was published in 2020.

Nevertheless, in his occupation-era diaries, von Aufseß occasionally referred to National Socialism as a "good idea, poorly executed." However, he did not specify what he considered "good" about it, only what he found troubling: its terrible "stubbornness," rigidity, and excessiveness. He described Hitler as "clumsy, unspiritual, and one-sided."

After his release from captivity in 1947, von Aufseß reestablished himself as a lawyer, first in Bamberg, where he also worked for the Higher Regional Court, and later in Naila. From 1959, he served as the General Director of the Ducal Family Administration of the House of Saxe-Coburg and Gotha in Coburg.

No essayist of the 20th century wrote as extensively about Nuremberg, Fürth, Erlangen, Bamberg, Bayreuth, and virtually every city, town, and village in Franconia as Hans Max von Aufseß. He was described as a "powerful advocate of Franconian identity" and was a member of the Rotary Club.

== Awards and honours ==
- In 1971, he received the Joseph E. Drexel Prize.
- In 1972, he was awarded the Cultural Prize of the Upper Franconian Economy. The Frankenwürfel, the highest award for Franconian humor, bestowed by the three Franconian administrative districts, originated from his 1983 book Der Franke ist ein Gewürfelter (The Franconian is a Dice-Rolled Man).
- In 1972, he was awarded the Cultural Prize of the Fränkische-Schweiz-Verein by District Administrator Franz-Josef Kaiser from Ebermannstadt.
- In 1980, he received the Wolfram von Eschenbach Prize from the district of Middle Franconia.
- In 1980, the district of Bayreuth honored his literary work with a newly established cultural award.
- In 1986, he received the Bavarian Poet's Medal from the Münchner Turmschreiber literary society.
- On November 11, 1997, he was posthumously awarded the Frankenwürfel.
