= Bayreuth–Hollfeld railway =

Bayreuth–Hollfeld

Overview
- Line number: 5002

Service
- Route number: ex 842

Technical
- Line length: 32.7 km (20.3 mi)
- Track gauge: 1,435 mm (4 ft 8 1/2 in)
- Minimum radius: 250 m (820 ft)
- Maximum incline: 1.92 %

The Bayreuth–Hollfeld railway was a branch line in the Bavarian province of Upper Franconia. It ran from Bayreuth to Hollfeld in the northern part of Franconian Switzerland.

== Construction ==
Plans for the construction of this line went back to the 1860s. Originally an even longer railway was planned: to the west via Forchheim–Höchstadt to Rothenburg and in the east into the Fichtel Mountains. A link to Bamberg via Scheßlitz was also considered. But due to the cost of building a route in such difficult terrain only the above-mentioned line was built. Its construction took place between 1902 and 1904 and the opening ceremony was held on 9 March 1904. The journey time for the route, which was just under 33 kilometres long, was two hours. To begin with there were only three pairs of trains per day.

== Route ==
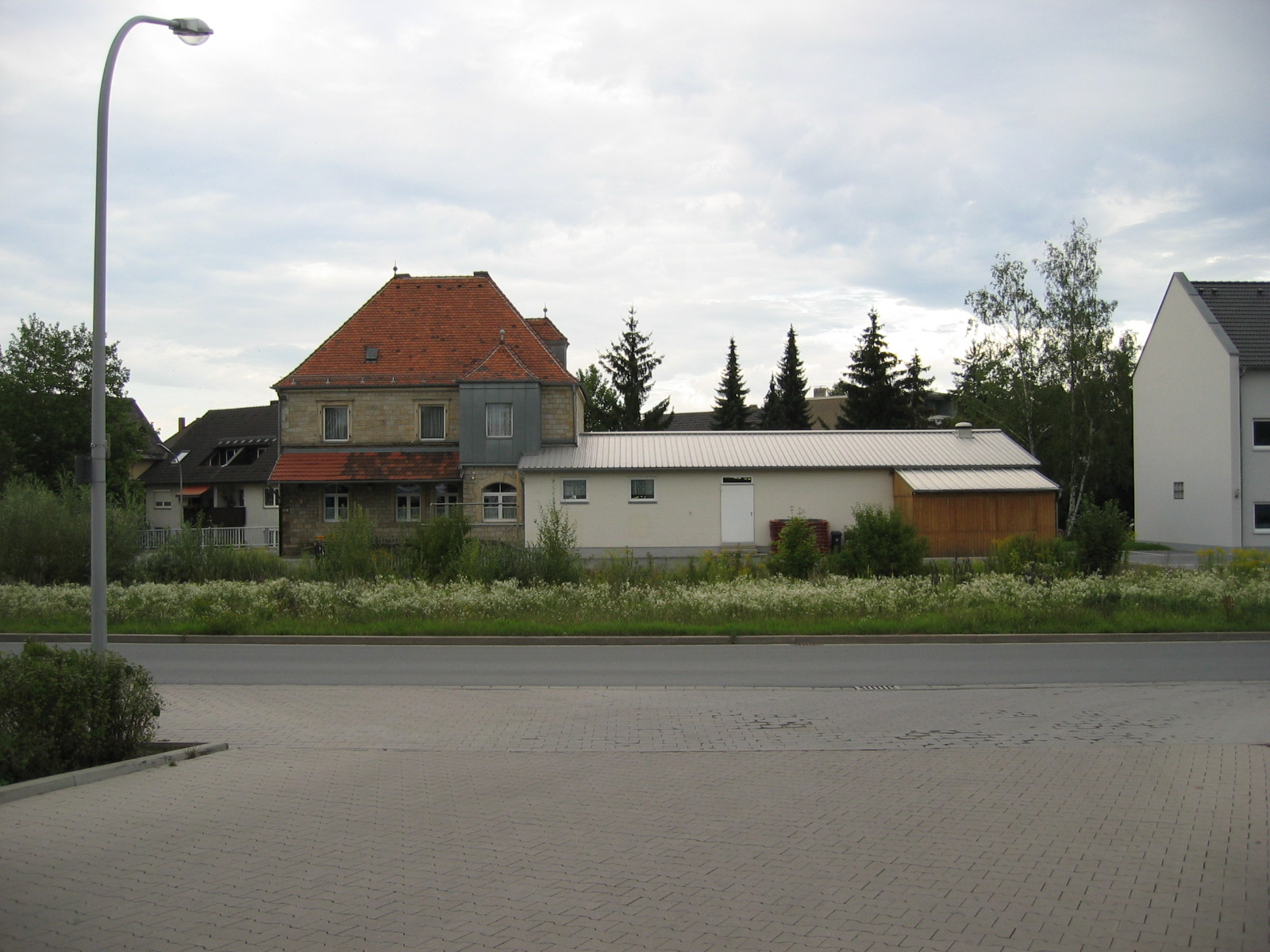
Bayreuth-Altstadt station from the south

The exact length of the line (from the centre line of the station buildings at each end) was 32.73 km and, as the crow flies, 20.5 km. The station at Bayreuth was 343.72 m above sea level and the terminus at Hollfeld was 41.58 m higher. The smallest curve radius was 250 m and the steepest incline was 19.2 ‰.

The Bayreuth municipal department (today the BEW) had a direct rail link to the gas works southwest of the Hofgarten. This railway link branched off from the main line in the vicinity of the present-day university between the halts of Kreuzstein and Röhrensee, roughly where the bridge over the Emil-Warburg-Weg is situated today. From there it ran northwards, crossed the Sendelbach stream, swung westwards and reached the gas works on Birkenstrasse after a good 800 metres.

Although it had been planned as early as 1918, it cannot have been built until the 1950s because no railway can be seen in US Air Force air photographs taken immediately after the Second World War. Its dismantling presumably followed the closure of the coal-to-gas plant at the end of the 1960s and before the construction of the Bayreuth city ring road.

In the industrial estate on Otto-Hahn-Strasse between Kreuzstein Halt and Bayreuth Altstadt station several firms and sheds were connected to the railway by industrial sidings. Some were sporadically used even into the early 1990s. A timber merchant's on Justus-Liebig-Strasse and the curtain factory on Leuschnerstrasse also had rail access.

== End of the line ==
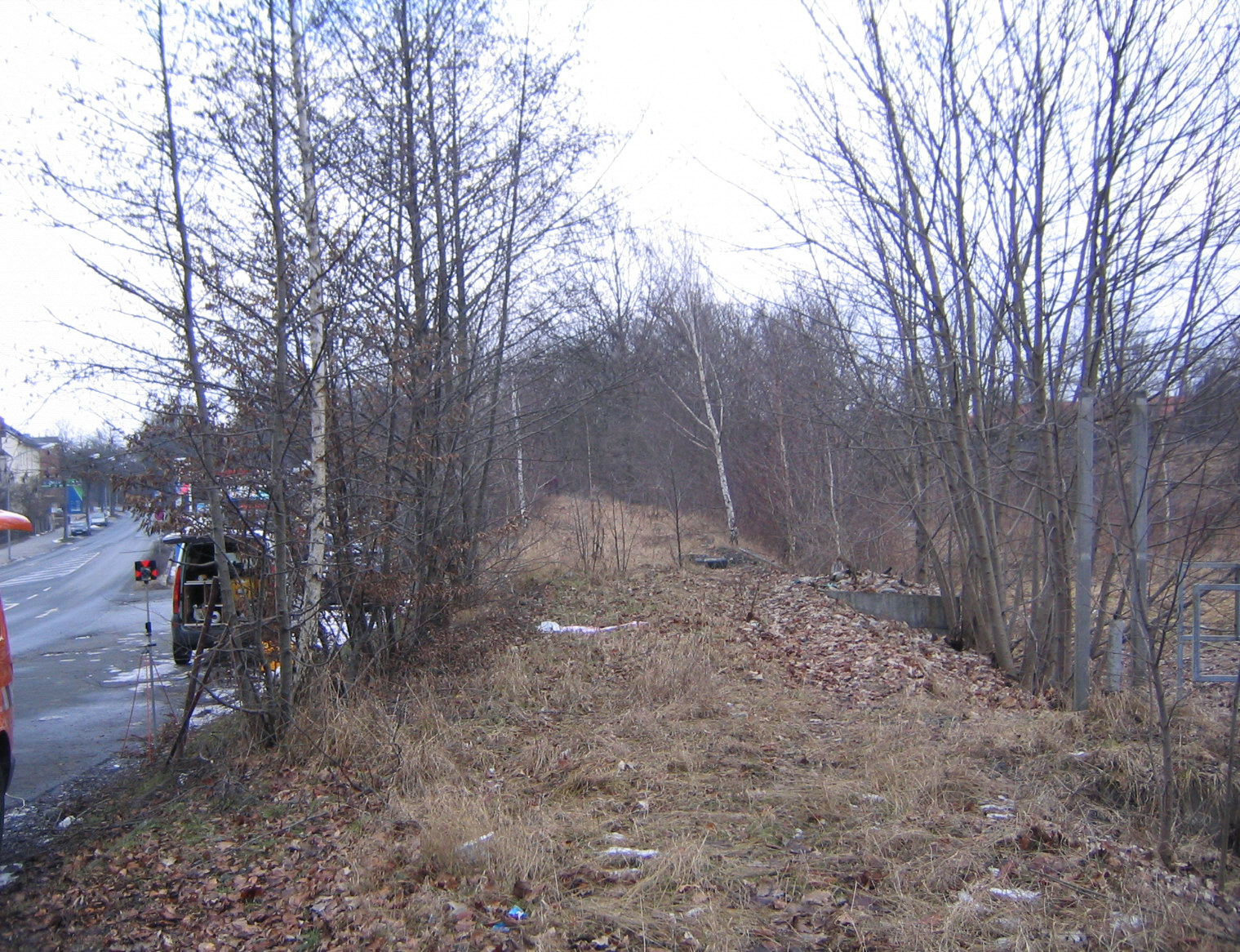
15 years later: closed line in Bayreuth between the branch-off point from the main line and Nürnberger Strasse

Like many other Lokalbahn lines this one was also closed as being supposedly unprofitable. The last train – a special hauled by steam locomotive 064 415-3, the last of a type once commonly used on the line – took place to a great reception from the local population on 28 September 1974. Its dismantling followed very quickly thereafter. The original plan to operate it purely as a goods line did not come to fruition. Most of the trackbed between Bayreuth and Plankenfels was converted into a cycle path.

Between Obernsees and Plankenfels the trackbed was used to upgrade and straighten the St 2186 state road. Between Mistelgau and its junction with district road BT2 SÖ from Hardt (1 km southeast of Frankenhaag) it was used to upgrade and straighten out the BT1 district road.

At the end of the 1980s when Bayreuth University underwent a major expansion, there were serious discussions about the construction of a "Universität" halt. It would have been built immediately east of the bridge over the Emil-Warburg-Weg and would have become an excellent link to local public transport services. It would have secured the preservation of the first 2.5 km of the line. Goods trains were still working to Bayreuth Altstadt until 1 October 1994. The city of Bayreuth bought in the 1990s the railway as far as the former Altstadt station. But no train services resulted. It was soon converted to a cycle path. Only 50 metres of railway line have been preserved in the area of the Altstadt as a quasi monument.
