= Plech =

- Municipality
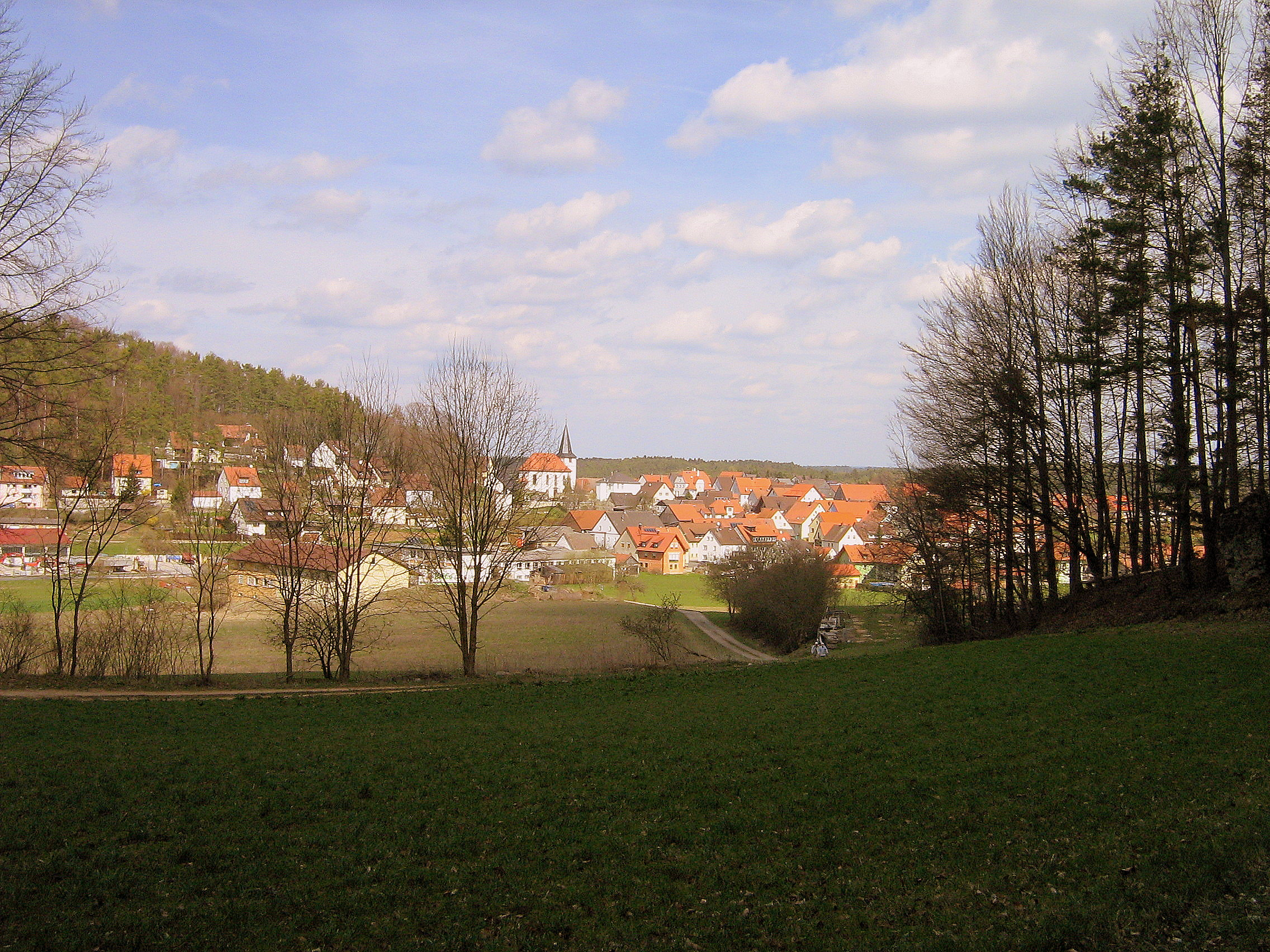
- General view of Plech

- Coat of arms

- Location of Plech within Bayreuth district
- Interactive map of Plech
- Location within Germany Location within Bavaria
- Coordinates: 49°38′08″N 11°28′09″E
- Country: Germany
- State: Bavaria
- Admin. region: Oberfranken
- District: Bayreuth
- Municipal assoc.: Betzenstein
- Subdivisions: 3 Ortsteile

Government
  - Mayor (2020–26): Karlheinz Escher

Area
  - Total: 15.29 km^{2} (5.90 sq mi)
- Elevation: 461 m (1,512 ft)

Population (2025-12-31)
  - Total: 1,333
  - Density: 87.18/km^{2} (225.8/sq mi)
- Time zone: UTC+01:00 (CET)
  - Summer (DST): UTC+02:00 (CEST)
- Postal codes: 91287
- Dialling codes: 09244
- Vehicle registration: BT
- Website: www.plech.de

Plech is a municipality in the district of Bayreuth in Bavaria in Germany.

The municipality consists of the small market town of Plech and two villages, Ottenhof and Bernheck.

Plech is directly connected to the A9 motorway via junction no. 46, which serves Plech and Betzenstein.
