= House of Aufseß =

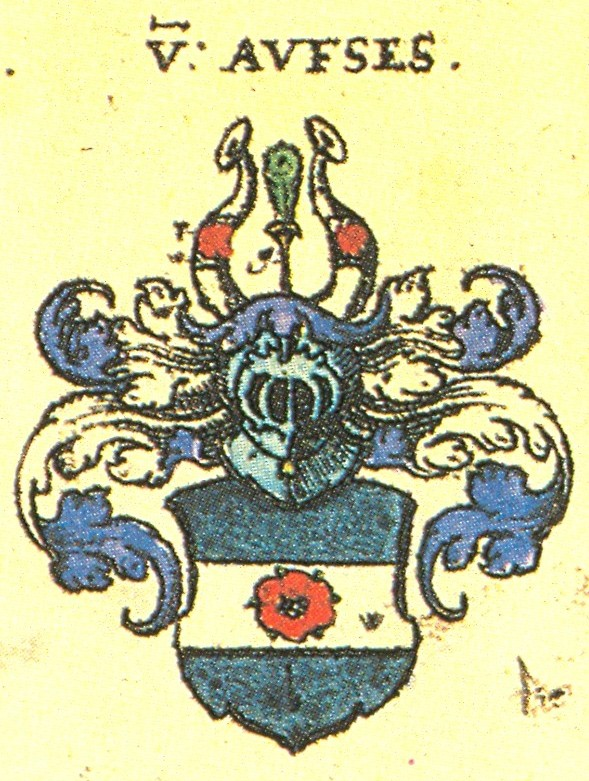
The Coat of arms of the Aufseß family in 1605

The Aufseß family, sometimes spelt Aufsees and Aufsess, is a Franconian noble family of Barons. The original family seat was at Unteraufseß castle in Aufseß, Upper Franconia. Members of this family held important Roman Catholic Church posts in Bamberg.

== Notable members ==
- Jobst Bernhard von Aufsees (28 March 1671 – 2 April 1738), also known as Jodocus, canon of Bamberg and Würzburg, was born in Mengersdorf. He was baptized as a Lutheran but educated as a Roman Catholic and was later the founder of the Aufseesianum in Bamberg.
- Friedrich III von Aufseß was Prince-Bishop of Bamberg from 1421 to 1431.
- Hans von und zu Aufseß was a baron and the principal founder of the Germanisches Nationalmuseum (formerly the "Germanischen Museums") in Nuremberg.

== Properties of the Aufseß family ==
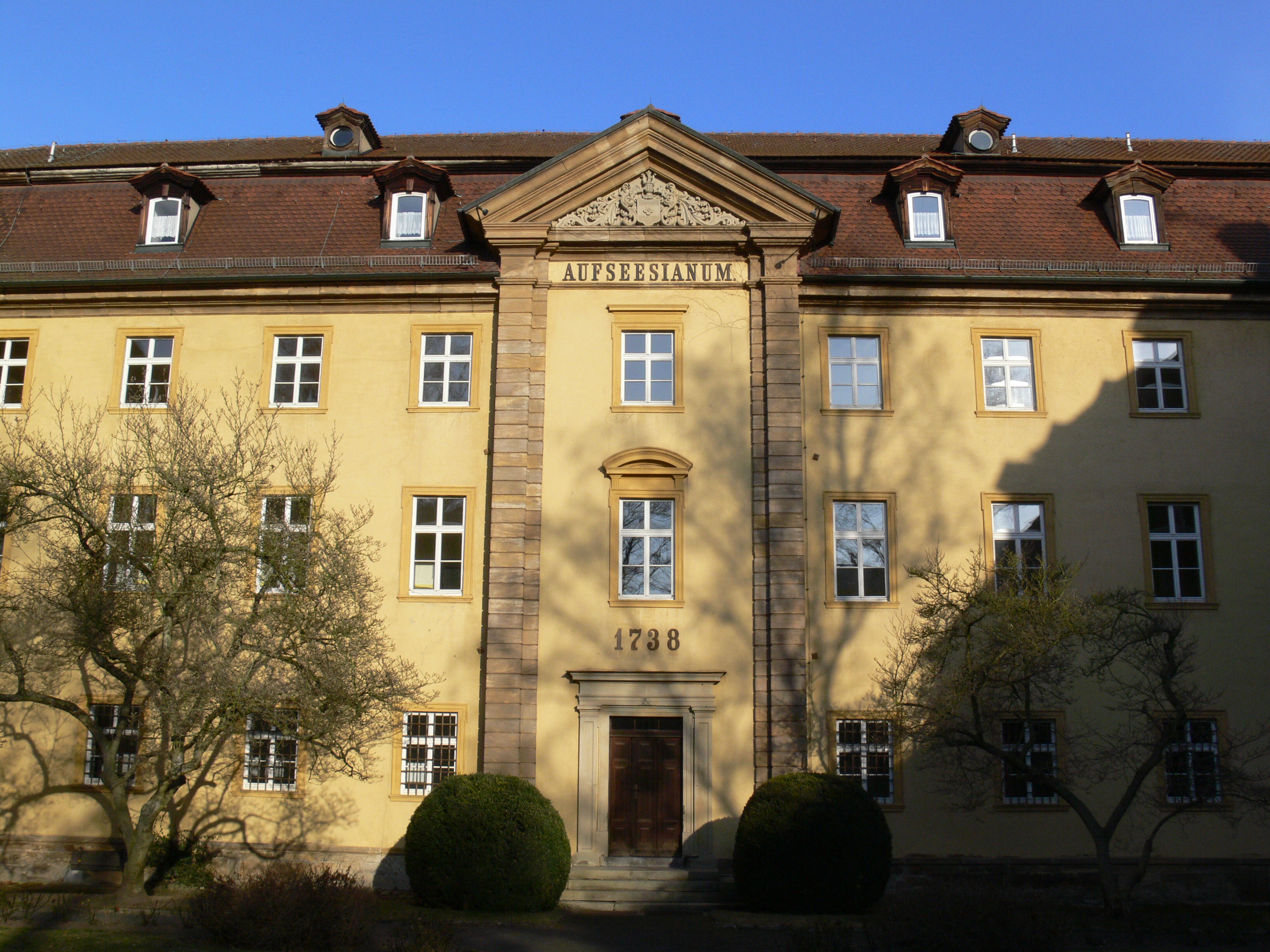
Jobst Bernhard von und zu Aufsees was the founder of the Aufseesianum in Bamberg

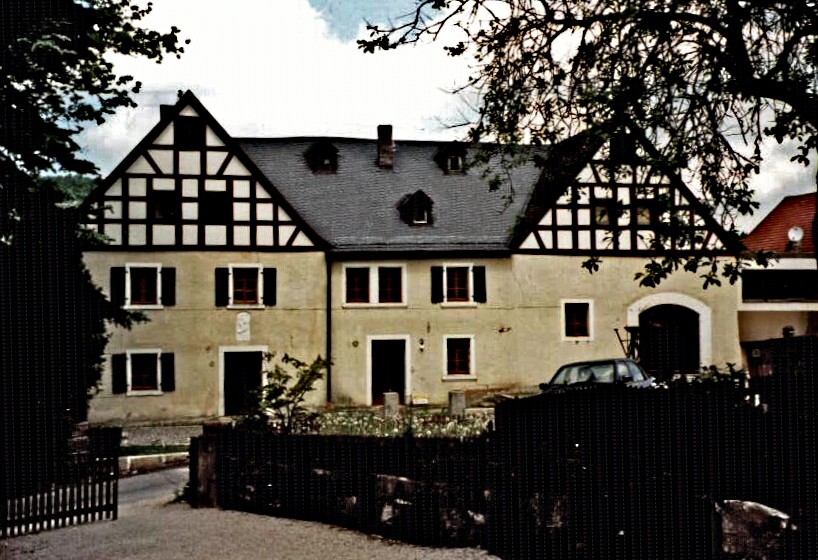
Manor house of the Aufseß family in Mengersdorf, near Mistelgau in Upper Franconia
