= Betzenstein (Verwaltungsgemeinschaft) =

- Verwaltungsgemeinschaft
- Location of Betzenstein within Bayreuth district
- Interactive map of Betzenstein
- Location within Germany Location within Bavaria
- Coordinates: 49°41′N 11°25′E
- Country: Germany
- State: Bavaria
- Admin. region: Upper Franconia
- District: Bayreuth
- Seat: Betzenstein
- Subdivisions: 2 municipalities

Area
  - Total: 67.13 km^{2} (25.92 sq mi)

Population (2025-12-31)
  - Total: 3,848
  - Density: 57.32/km^{2} (148.5/sq mi)
- Time zone: UTC+01:00 (CET)
  - Summer (DST): UTC+02:00 (CEST)
- Website: www.betzenstein.de

Betzenstein is a Verwaltungsgemeinschaft (municipal association) in the district of Bayreuth in Bavaria, Germany. Its seat is in Betzenstein. It consists of the following municipalities:

1. Betzenstein
2. Plech
