= Creußen (Verwaltungsgemeinschaft) =

- Verwaltungsgemeinschaft
- Location of Creußen within Bayreuth district
- Interactive map of Creußen
- Location within Germany Location within Bavaria
- Coordinates: 49°51′N 11°37′E
- Country: Germany
- State: Bavaria
- Admin. region: Upper Franconia
- District: Bayreuth
- Seat: Creußen
- Subdivisions: 4 municipalities

Area
  - Total: 123.04 km^{2} (47.51 sq mi)

Population (2025-12-31)
  - Total: 7,795
  - Density: 63.35/km^{2} (164.1/sq mi)
- Time zone: UTC+01:00 (CET)
  - Summer (DST): UTC+02:00 (CEST)
- Website: www.vg-creussen.de

Creußen is a Verwaltungsgemeinschaft (municipal association) in the district of Bayreuth in Bavaria, Germany. Its seat is in Creußen. It consists of the following municipalities:

1. Creußen
2. Haag
3. Prebitz
4. Schnabelwaid
