= Truppach (Wiesent) =

River in Germany

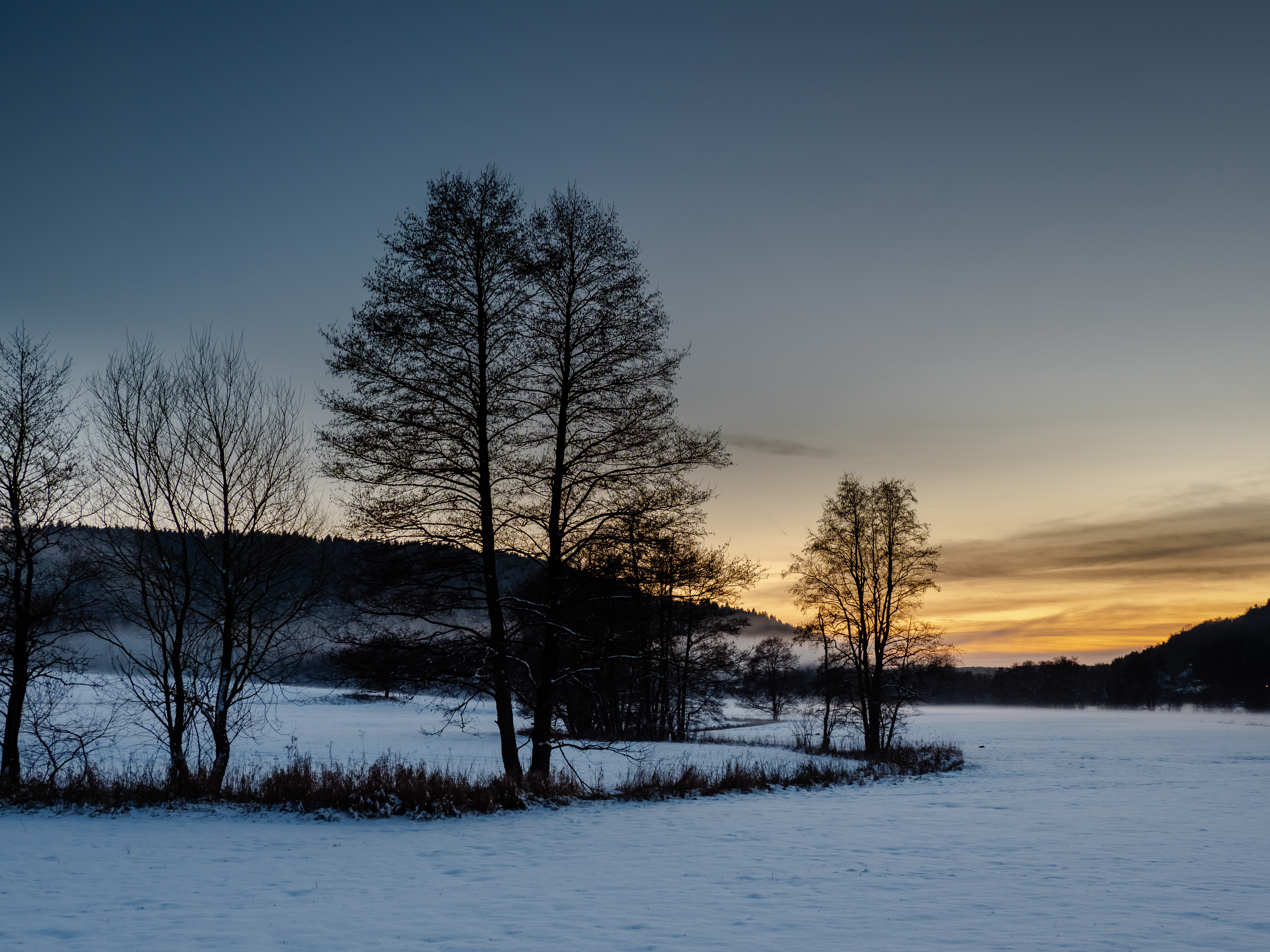
- Alders in the valley of the Truppach in Franconian Switzerland

Location
- Country: Germany
- State: Bavaria

Physical characteristics
- Mouth
  - location: Wiesent
  - coordinates: 49.8774°N 11.3346°E

Basin features
- Progression: Wiesent→ Regnitz→ Main→ Rhine→ North Sea

Truppach is a river of Bavaria, Germany. It is a left tributary of the Wiesent near Plankenfels.

== See also ==
- List of rivers of Bavaria
