= Seybothenreuth =

- Municipality
- Coat of arms

- Location of Seybothenreuth within Bayreuth district
- Interactive map of Seybothenreuth
- Location within Germany Location within Bavaria
- Coordinates: 49°53′39″N 11°42′18″E
- Country: Germany
- State: Bavaria
- Admin. region: Oberfranken
- District: Bayreuth
- Municipal assoc.: Weidenberg
- Subdivisions: 9 Ortsteile

Government
  - Mayor (2020–26): Reinhard Preißinger

Area
  - Total: 17.44 km^{2} (6.73 sq mi)
- Elevation: 420 m (1,380 ft)

Population (2025-12-31)
  - Total: 1,258
  - Density: 72.13/km^{2} (186.8/sq mi)
- Time zone: UTC+01:00 (CET)
  - Summer (DST): UTC+02:00 (CEST)
- Postal codes: 95517
- Dialling codes: 09275, 09278
- Vehicle registration: BT
- Website: www.seybothenreuth.de

Seybothenreuth is a municipality in the district of Bayreuth in Upper Franconia in Bavaria, Germany.
