= Hollfeld (Verwaltungsgemeinschaft) =

- Verwaltungsgemeinschaft
- Location of Hollfeld within Bayreuth district
- Interactive map of Hollfeld
- Location within Germany Location within Bavaria
- Coordinates: 49°56′N 11°18′E
- Country: Germany
- State: Bavaria
- Admin. region: Upper Franconia
- District: Bayreuth
- Seat: Hollfeld
- Subdivisions: 3 municipalities

Area
  - Total: 124.06 km^{2} (47.90 sq mi)

Population (2025-12-31)
  - Total: 6,856
  - Density: 55.26/km^{2} (143.1/sq mi)
- Time zone: UTC+01:00 (CET)
  - Summer (DST): UTC+02:00 (CEST)
- Website: www.vg-hollfeld.de

Hollfeld is a Verwaltungsgemeinschaft (municipal association) in the district of Bayreuth in Bavaria, Germany. Its seat is in Hollfeld. It consists of the following municipalities:

1. Aufseß
2. Hollfeld
3. Plankenfels
