= Mistelbach (Verwaltungsgemeinschaft) =

- Verwaltungsgemeinschaft
- Location of Mistelbach within Bayreuth district
- Interactive map of Mistelbach
- Location within Germany Location within Bavaria
- Coordinates: 49°55′N 11°31′E
- Country: Germany
- State: Bavaria
- Admin. region: Upper Franconia
- District: Bayreuth
- Seat: Mistelbach
- Subdivisions: 3 municipalities

Area
  - Total: 38.46 km^{2} (14.85 sq mi)

Population (2025-12-31)
  - Total: 5,153
  - Density: 134.0/km^{2} (347.0/sq mi)
- Time zone: UTC+01:00 (CET)
  - Summer (DST): UTC+02:00 (CEST)
- Website: www.vg-mistelbach.de

Mistelbach is a Verwaltungsgemeinschaft (municipal association) in the district of Bayreuth in Bavaria, Germany. Its seat is in Mistelbach. It consists of the following municipalities:

1. Gesees
2. Hummeltal
3. Mistelbach
