= Truppach (Mistelgau) =

Coordinates: 49.90861°N 11.37194°E

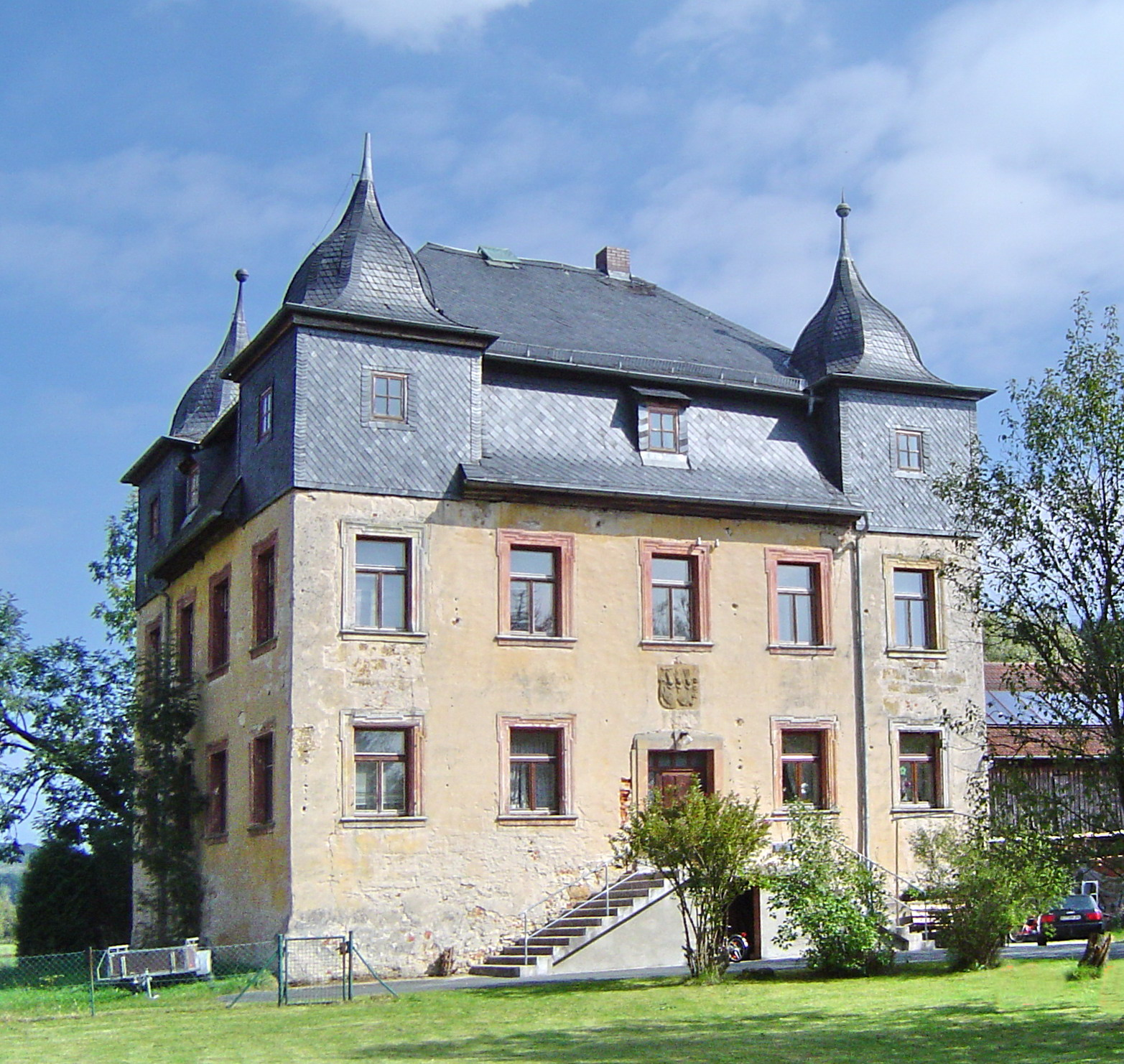
Truppach Castle

Truppach is a district of Mistelgau, a municipality in the district of Bayreuth in Bavaria in Germany.
