= Schnabelwaid =

- Municipality
- Coat of arms

- Location of Schnabelwaid within Bayreuth district
- Interactive map of Schnabelwaid
- Location within Germany Location within Bavaria
- Coordinates: 49°49′N 11°34′E
- Country: Germany
- State: Bavaria
- Admin. region: Oberfranken
- District: Bayreuth
- Municipal assoc.: Creußen
- Subdivisions: 8 Ortsteile

Government
  - Mayor (2020–26): Hans-Walter Hofmann (CSU)

Area
  - Total: 21.28 km^{2} (8.22 sq mi)
- Elevation: 451 m (1,480 ft)

Population (2025-12-31)
  - Total: 977
  - Density: 45.9/km^{2} (119/sq mi)
- Time zone: UTC+01:00 (CET)
  - Summer (DST): UTC+02:00 (CEST)
- Postal codes: 91289
- Dialling codes: 09270
- Vehicle registration: BT
- Website: www.markt-schnabelwaid.de

Schnabelwaid is a municipality in the district of Bayreuth in Bavaria in Germany.
