= Prebitz =

- Municipality
- Coat of arms

- Location of Prebitz within Bayreuth district
- Interactive map of Prebitz
- Location within Germany Location within Bavaria
- Coordinates: 49°50′2.69″N 11°41′5.92″E
- Country: Germany
- State: Bavaria
- Admin. region: Oberfranken
- District: Bayreuth
- Municipal assoc.: Creußen
- Subdivisions: 13 Ortsteile

Government
  - Mayor (2020–26): Hans Freiberger

Area
  - Total: 20.99 km^{2} (8.10 sq mi)
- Elevation: 419 m (1,375 ft)

Population (2025-12-31)
  - Total: 949
  - Density: 45.2/km^{2} (117/sq mi)
- Time zone: UTC+01:00 (CET)
  - Summer (DST): UTC+02:00 (CEST)
- Postal codes: 95473
- Dialling codes: 09270
- Vehicle registration: BT

Prebitz is a municipality in the district of Bayreuth in Bavaria in Germany.
