= Mistelbach, Bavaria =

Mistelbach
- Municipality
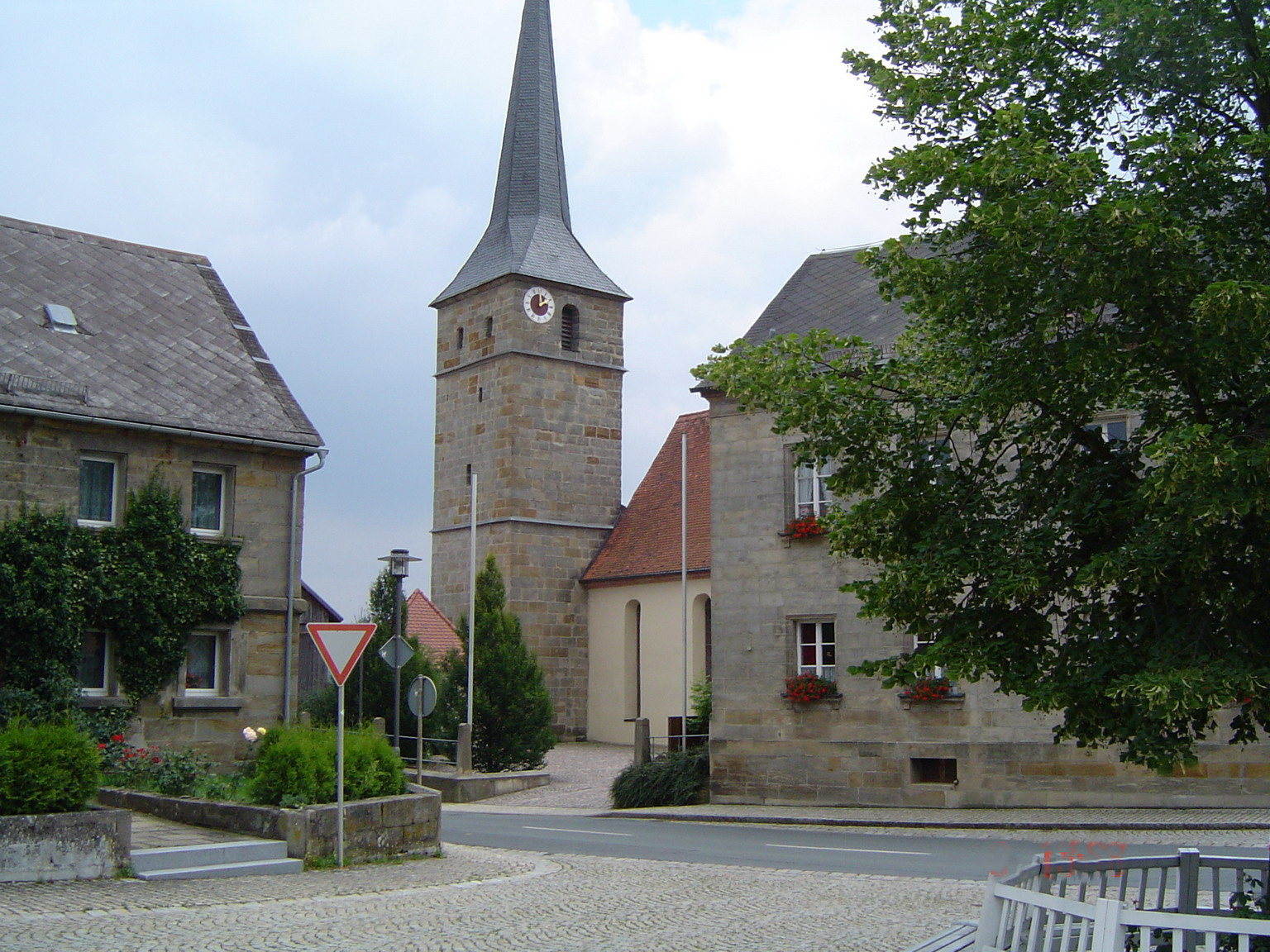
- Church of Saint Bartholomew

- Coat of arms

- Location of Mistelbach within Bayreuth district
- Interactive map of Mistelbach
- Location within Germany Location within Bavaria
- Coordinates: 49°55′N 11°31′E
- Country: Germany
- State: Bavaria
- Admin. region: Oberfranken
- District: Bayreuth
- Municipal assoc.: Mistelbach

Government
  - Mayor (2020–26): Matthias Mann (SPD)

Area
  - Total: 6.12 km^{2} (2.36 sq mi)
- Elevation: 408 m (1,339 ft)

Population (2025-12-31)
  - Total: 1,475
  - Density: 241/km^{2} (624/sq mi)
- Time zone: UTC+01:00 (CET)
  - Summer (DST): UTC+02:00 (CEST)
- Postal codes: 95511
- Dialling codes: 09201
- Vehicle registration: BT
- Website: www.mistelbach.de

Mistelbach is a municipality in the district of Bayreuth in Upper Franconia in Bavaria, Germany.
