= Haag, Upper Franconia =

Haag
- Municipality
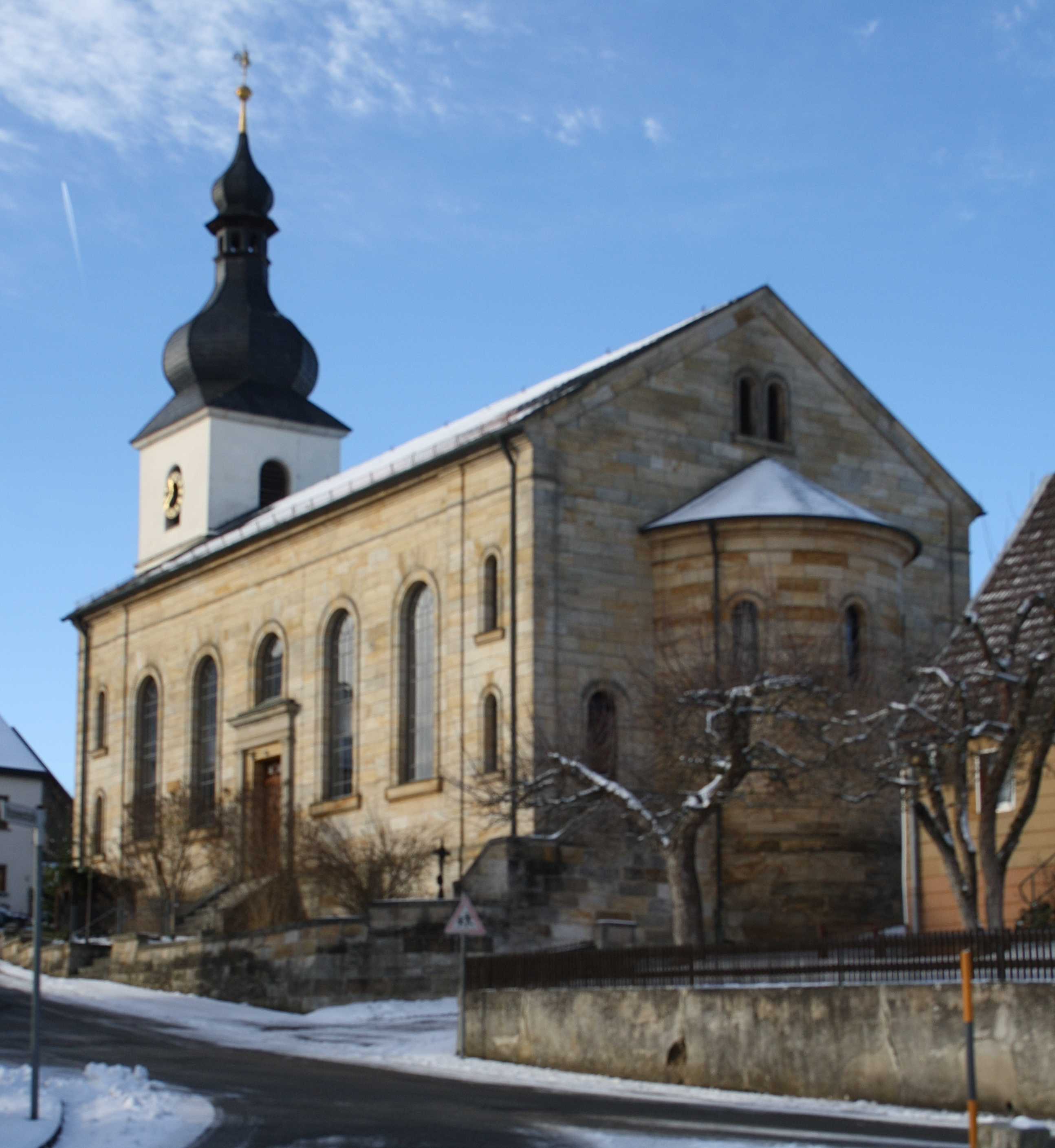
- Church of Saint Catherine

- Coat of arms

- Location of Haag within Bayreuth district
- Interactive map of Haag
- Location within Germany Location within Bavaria
- Coordinates: 49°52′11.08″N 11°33′45.46″E
- Country: Germany
- State: Bavaria
- Admin. region: Oberfranken
- District: Bayreuth
- Municipal assoc.: Creußen
- Subdivisions: 12 Ortsteile

Government
  - Mayor (2020–26): Robert Pensel (CSU)

Area
  - Total: 15.89 km^{2} (6.14 sq mi)
- Elevation: 485 m (1,591 ft)

Population (2025-12-31)
  - Total: 944
  - Density: 59.4/km^{2} (154/sq mi)
- Time zone: UTC+01:00 (CET)
  - Summer (DST): UTC+02:00 (CEST)
- Postal codes: 95473
- Dialling codes: 09201
- Vehicle registration: BT
- Website: www.haag-oberfranken.de

Haag (German pronunciation: [haːk]) is a municipality in the district of Bayreuth in Bavaria in Germany.
