= Kirchenpingarten =

- Municipality
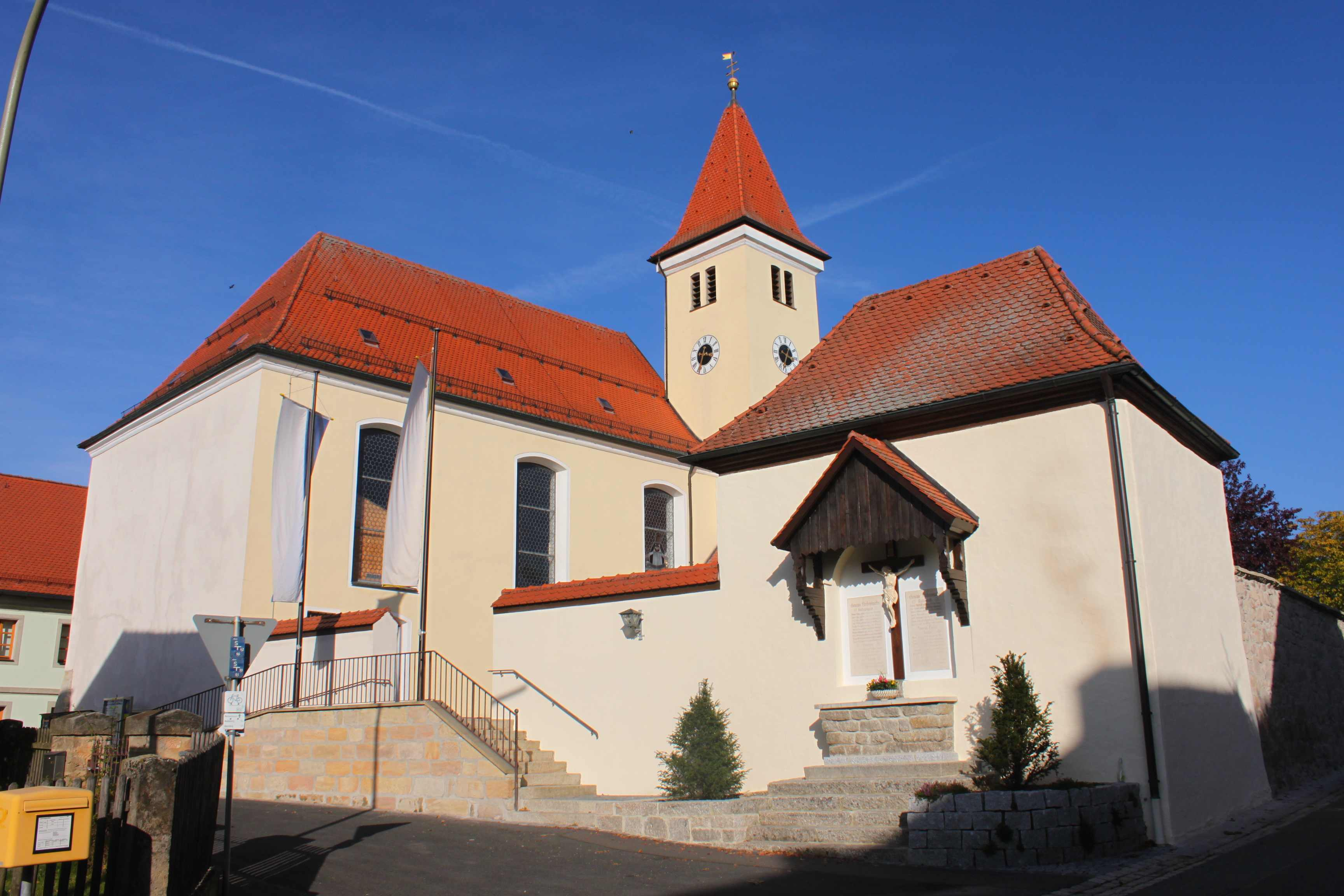
- Church of Saint James the Elder

- Coat of arms

- Location of Kirchenpingarten within Bayreuth district
- Interactive map of Kirchenpingarten
- Location within Germany Location within Bavaria
- Coordinates: 49°55′18″N 11°47′12″E
- Country: Germany
- State: Bavaria
- Admin. region: Oberfranken
- District: Bayreuth
- Municipal assoc.: Weidenberg
- Subdivisions: 16 Ortsteile

Government
  - Mayor (2020–26): Markus Brauner

Area
  - Total: 33.55 km^{2} (12.95 sq mi)
- Elevation: 525 m (1,722 ft)

Population (2025-12-31)
  - Total: 1,275
  - Density: 38.00/km^{2} (98.43/sq mi)
- Time zone: UTC+01:00 (CET)
  - Summer (DST): UTC+02:00 (CEST)
- Postal codes: 95466
- Dialling codes: 09278
- Vehicle registration: BT
- Website: www.kirchenpingarten.de

Kirchenpingarten is a municipality in the district of Bayreuth in Bavaria in Germany.
