= Weidenberg (Verwaltungsgemeinschaft) =

- Verwaltungsgemeinschaft
- Location of Weidenberg within Bayreuth district
- Interactive map of Weidenberg
- Location within Germany Location within Bavaria
- Coordinates: 49°57′N 11°43′E
- Country: Germany
- State: Bavaria
- Admin. region: Upper Franconia
- District: Bayreuth
- Seat: Weidenberg
- Subdivisions: 4 municipalities

Area
  - Total: 142.2 km^{2} (54.9 sq mi)

Population (2025-12-31)
  - Total: 9,323
  - Density: 65.56/km^{2} (169.8/sq mi)
- Time zone: UTC+01:00 (CET)
  - Summer (DST): UTC+02:00 (CEST)
- Website: www.weidenberg.de

Weidenberg is a Verwaltungsgemeinschaft (municipal association) in the district of Bayreuth in Bavaria, Germany. Its seat is in Weidenberg. It consists of the following municipalities:

1. Emtmannsberg
2. Kirchenpingarten
3. Seybothenreuth
4. Weidenberg
