= Mistelgau (Verwaltungsgemeinschaft) =

- Verwaltungsgemeinschaft
- Location of Mistelgau within Bayreuth district
- Interactive map of Mistelgau
- Location within Germany Location within Bavaria
- Coordinates: 49°55′N 11°28′E
- Country: Germany
- State: Bavaria
- Admin. region: Upper Franconia
- District: Bayreuth
- Seat: Mistelgau
- Subdivisions: 2 municipalities

Area
  - Total: 46.04 km^{2} (17.78 sq mi)

Population (2025-12-31)
  - Total: 5,111
  - Density: 111.0/km^{2} (287.5/sq mi)
- Time zone: UTC+01:00 (CET)
  - Summer (DST): UTC+02:00 (CEST)

Mistelgau is a Verwaltungsgemeinschaft (municipal association) in the district of Bayreuth in Bavaria, Germany. Its seat is in Mistelgau. It consists of the following municipalities:

1. Glashütten
2. Mistelgau
