= Obernsees =

Coordinates: 49.919075°N 11.384341°E

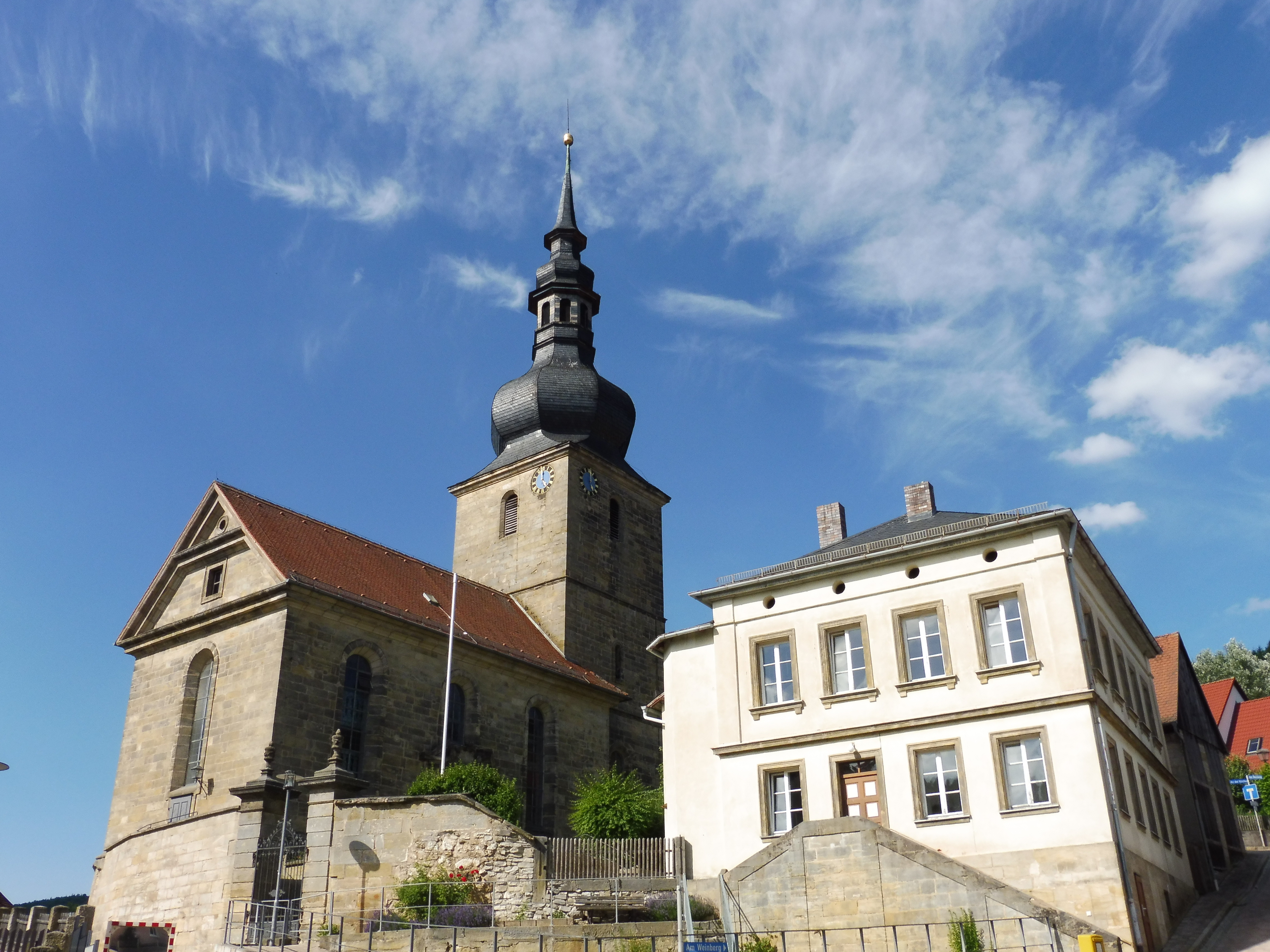
Kirche St Jakob in Obernsees und Kantorat

Obernsees is a village in Germany. It is part of the municipality Mistelgau in the district of Bayreuth in Bavaria.
