= Hans von und zu Aufseß =

German antiquarian (1801–1872)

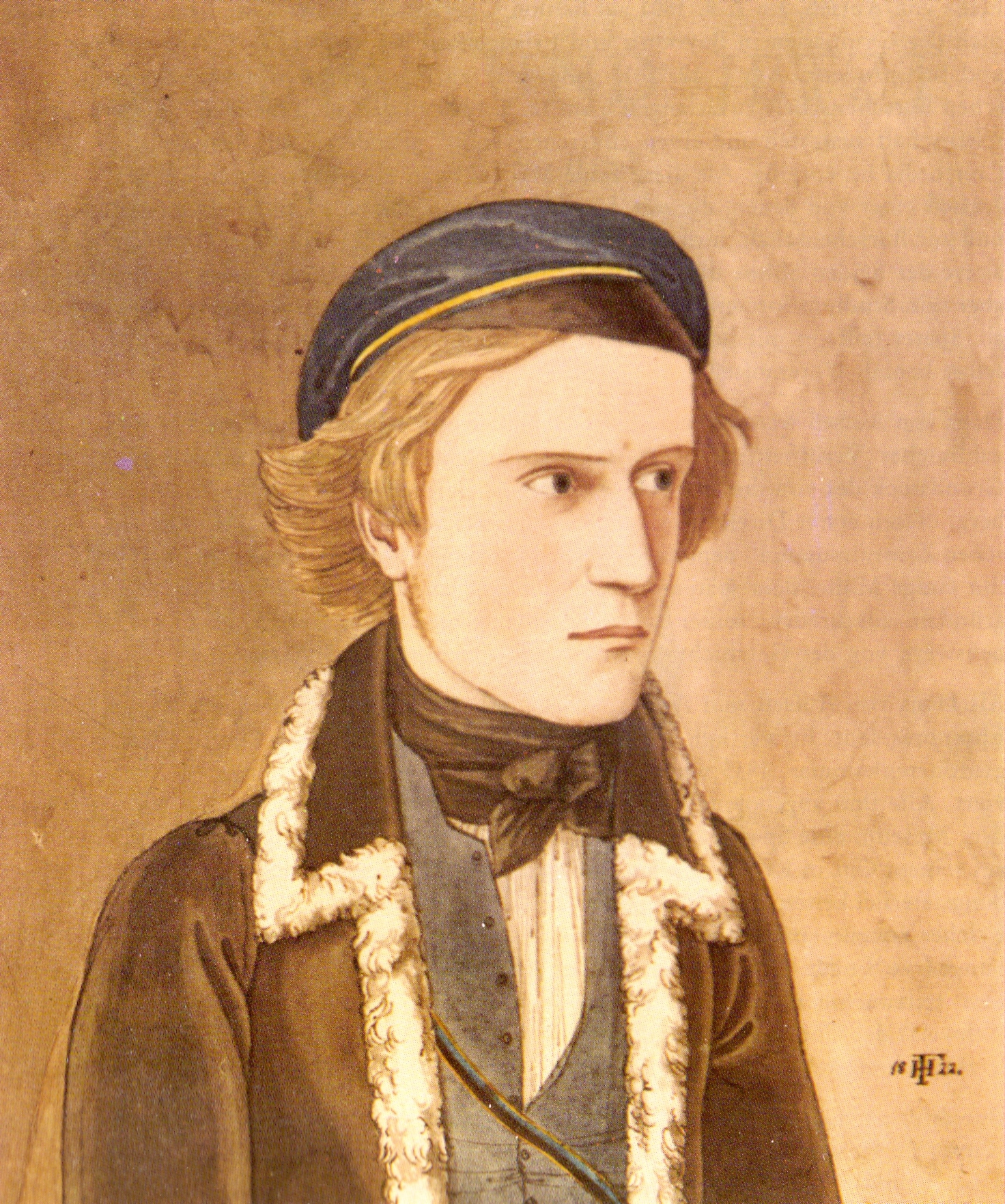
- Von Aufseß as a student at Erlangen in 1822, by Friedrich Hoffstadt (1802–1846)
- Born: Hans Philipp Werner Freiherr von und zu Aufseß; 7 September 1801; Aufseß, Kingdom of Bavaria
- Died: 6 May 1872 (aged 70); Münsterlingen
- Occupation: Antiquarian
- Known for: Founding of the Germanisches Museum in Nuremberg

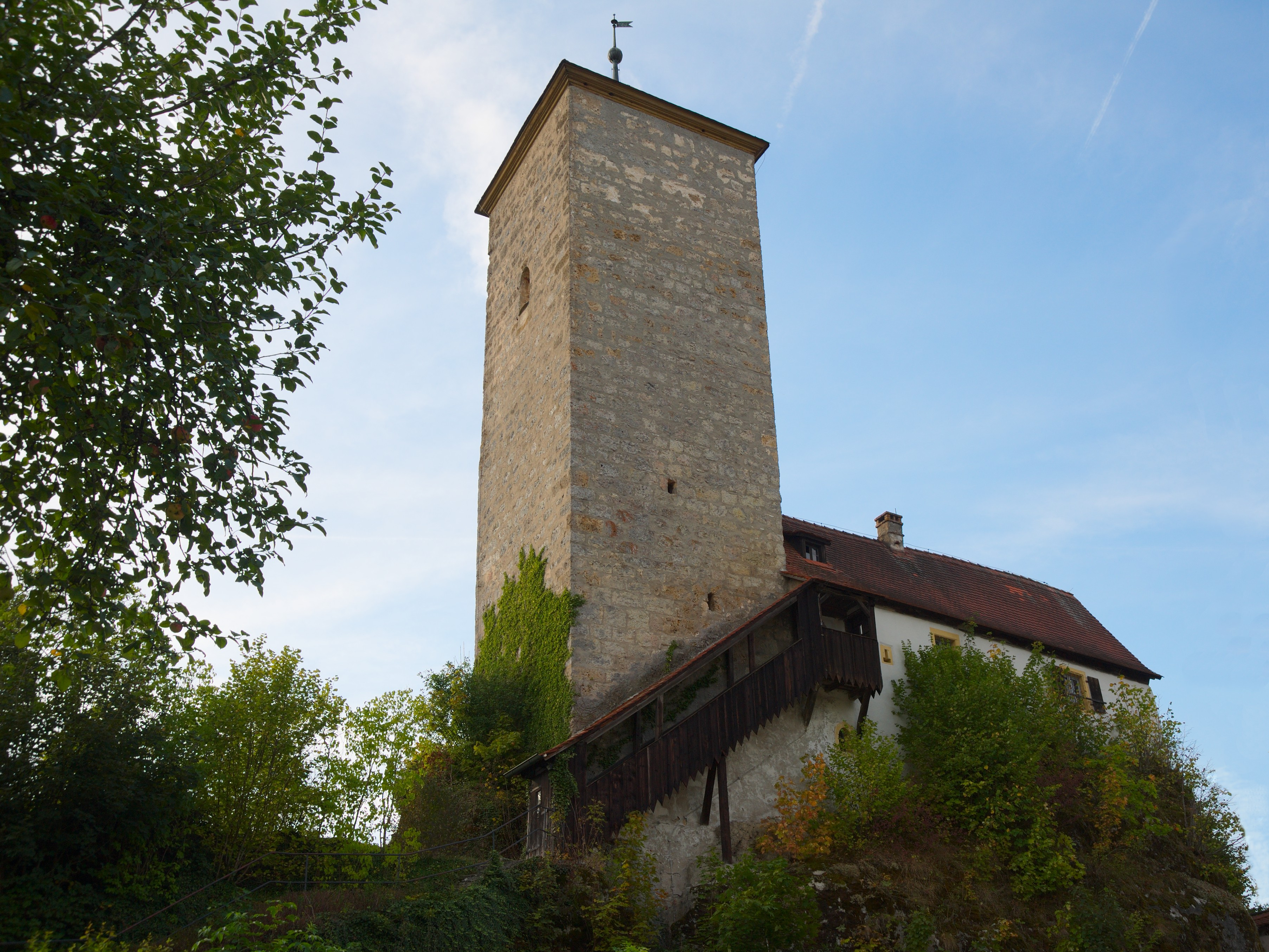
birthplace Hans von Aufseß

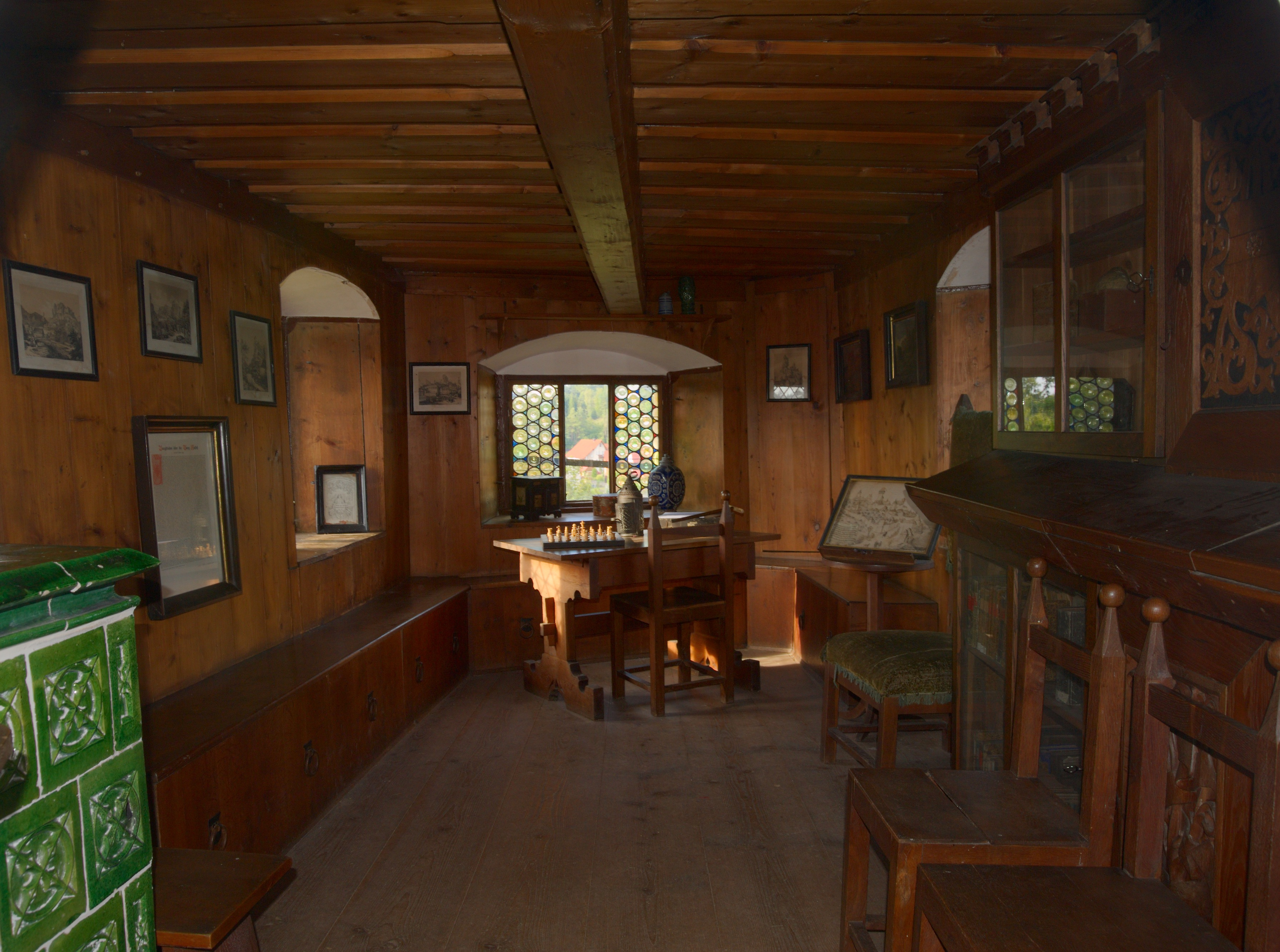
Study-room of Hans von Aufseß

Castle Unteraufseß

Hans Philipp Werner, Freiherr von und zu Aufseß (1801–1872) was a German baron, antiquarian and lead founder of the Germanisches Museum in Nuremberg.

Born at Castle Unteraufseß into the Aufseß noble family, he studied law at Erlangen and was employed at the courts at Bayreuth and Gräfenberg. He received his doctorate in law in 1822 and left public service, dedicating himself to the administration of the family estate and to the study of German antiquity. He accumulated a substantial library and art collection. His genealogical research into his family's history was published in 1838.

His antiquarian studies were influenced by the ideals of Romanticism and nascent German nationalism of the time. From 1832, he co-edited the journal Anzeiger für Kunde der deutschen Vorzeit. From 1846, von Aufseß dedicated himself to the creation of a museum for German antiquity. He moved to Nuremberg in 1848 and worked towards this goal for a number of years, leading up to the foundation of the Germanic Museum (Germanisches Museum) in 1852, for which he served as director until 1862. At this point he retired and spent his final years on an estate in Kressbronn am Bodensee. He died in Münsterlingen, Thurgau, succumbing to injuries he received from a mob of angry students when he visited the opening ceremony of Strasbourg University due to a case of mistaken identity, being taken for a "Francophile".

A great-nephew, Hans Max von Aufseß (1906–1993), also known as Baron von Aufsess, was Chief Civil Administrator of Jersey, during the German occupation of the Channel Islands (1942–1945).
