= Betzenstein =

- Town
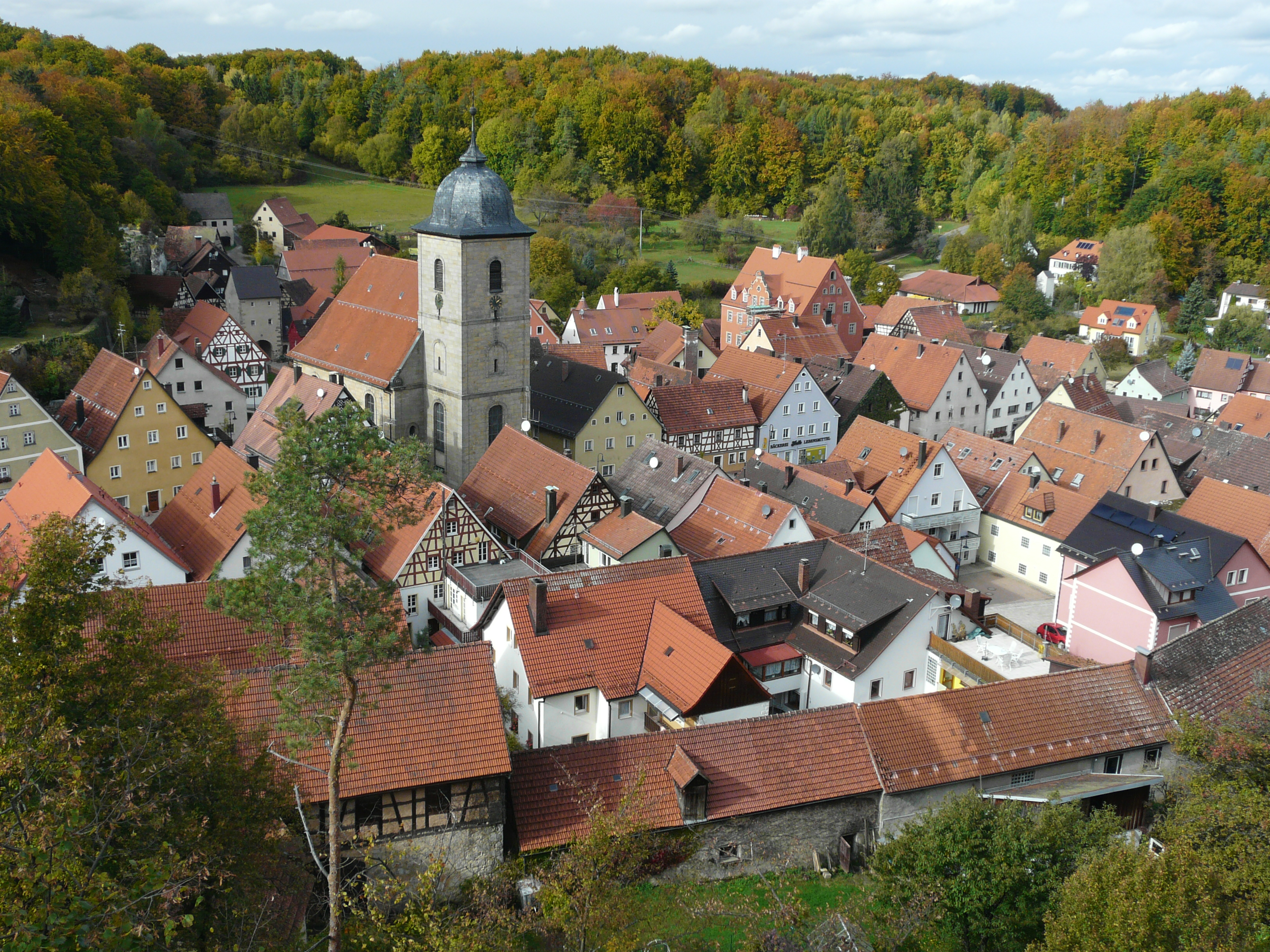
- Betzenstein

- Coat of arms

- Location of Betzenstein within Bayreuth district
- Interactive map of Betzenstein
- Location within Germany Location within Bavaria
- Coordinates: 49°40′49″N 11°25′04″E
- Country: Germany
- State: Bavaria
- Admin. region: Oberfranken
- District: Bayreuth
- Municipal assoc.: Betzenstein

Government
  - Mayor (2020–26): Claus Meyer (FW)

Area
  - Total: 51.84 km^{2} (20.02 sq mi)
- Elevation: 511 m (1,677 ft)

Population (2025-12-31)
  - Total: 2,515
  - Density: 48.51/km^{2} (125.7/sq mi)
- Time zone: UTC+01:00 (CET)
  - Summer (DST): UTC+02:00 (CEST)
- Postal codes: 91282
- Dialling codes: 09244
- Vehicle registration: BT
- Website: www.betzenstein.de

Betzenstein (German pronunciation: [ˈbɛtsn̩ˌʃtaɪn]) is a town in the district of Bayreuth, in Bavaria, Germany. It is situated in the Franconian Switzerland, 35 km northeast of Nuremberg.
