= Aufseß =

- Municipality
- Coat of arms

- Location of Aufseß within Bayreuth district
- Interactive map of Aufseß
- Location within Germany Location within Bavaria
- Coordinates: 49°54′N 11°13′E
- Country: Germany
- State: Bavaria
- Admin. region: Upper Franconia
- District: Bayreuth
- Municipal assoc.: Hollfeld

Government
  - Mayor (2020–26): Alexander Schrüfer

Area
  - Total: 29 km^{2} (11 sq mi)
- Elevation: 414 m (1,358 ft)

Population (2025-12-31)
  - Total: 1,250
  - Density: 43/km^{2} (110/sq mi)
- Time zone: UTC+01:00 (CET)
  - Summer (DST): UTC+02:00 (CEST)
- Postal codes: 91347
- Dialling codes: 09198, 09274, 09204
- Vehicle registration: BT
- Website: www.aufsess.de

Aufseß, also sometimes spelled Aufsess, is a municipality in the district of Bayreuth in Bavaria, Germany.

Located in Franconian Switzerland on the Castle Road and the Franconian Bierstraße, or Beer Road, Aufseß is best known for its connection with the noble family of Aufsess, Knights of the Empire. Notable members of the family include Jobst Bernhard von und zu Aufsees, the founder of the Aufseesianum in Bamberg, Friedrich III von Aufseß, Prince-Bishop of Bamberg (1421–1431), and Hans von und zu Aufseß, who in 1852 was the principal founder of the Germanisches Nationalmuseum (formerly the "Germanischen Museums“) in Nuremberg.

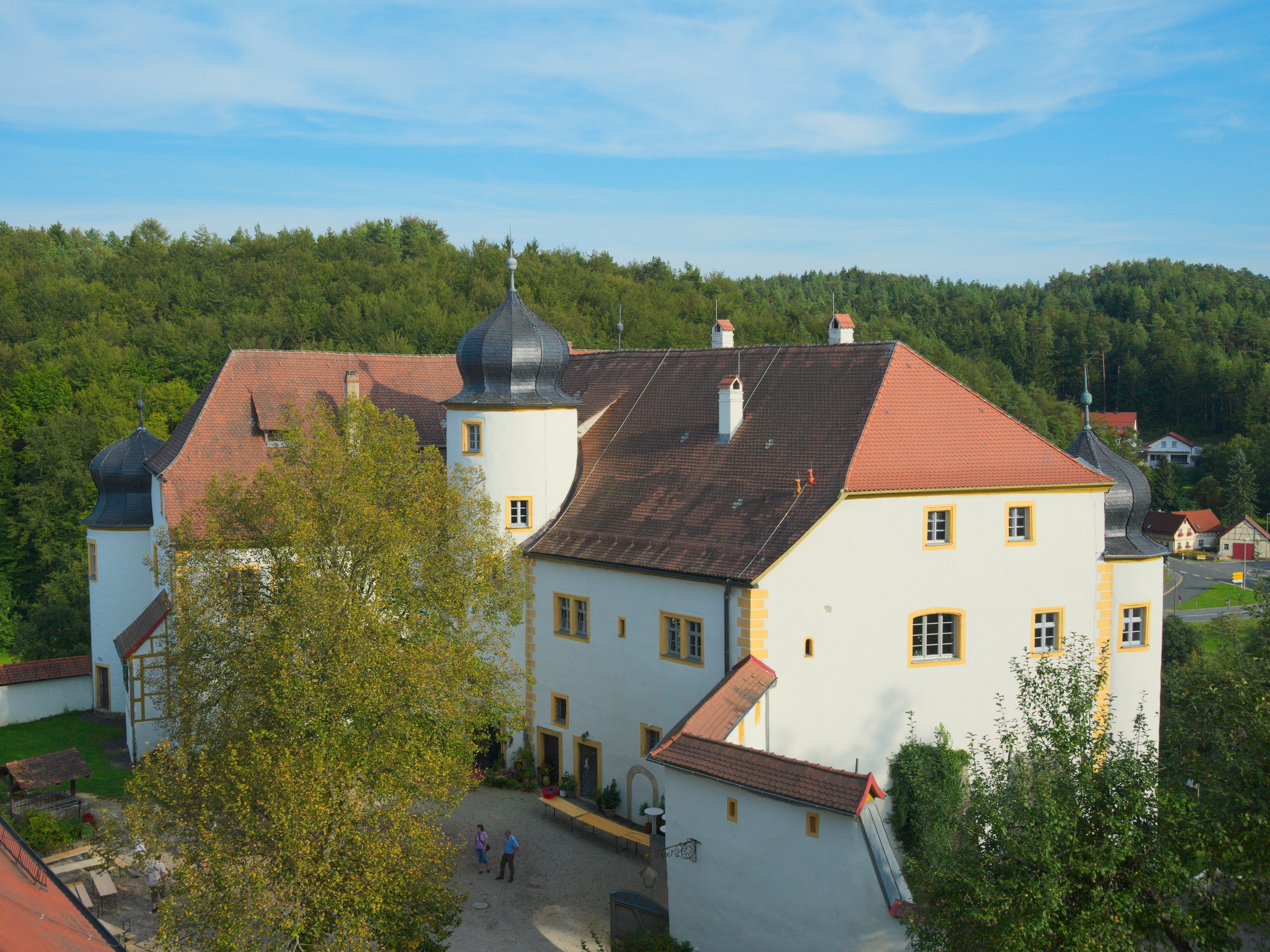
Castle Unteraufseß inner courtyard

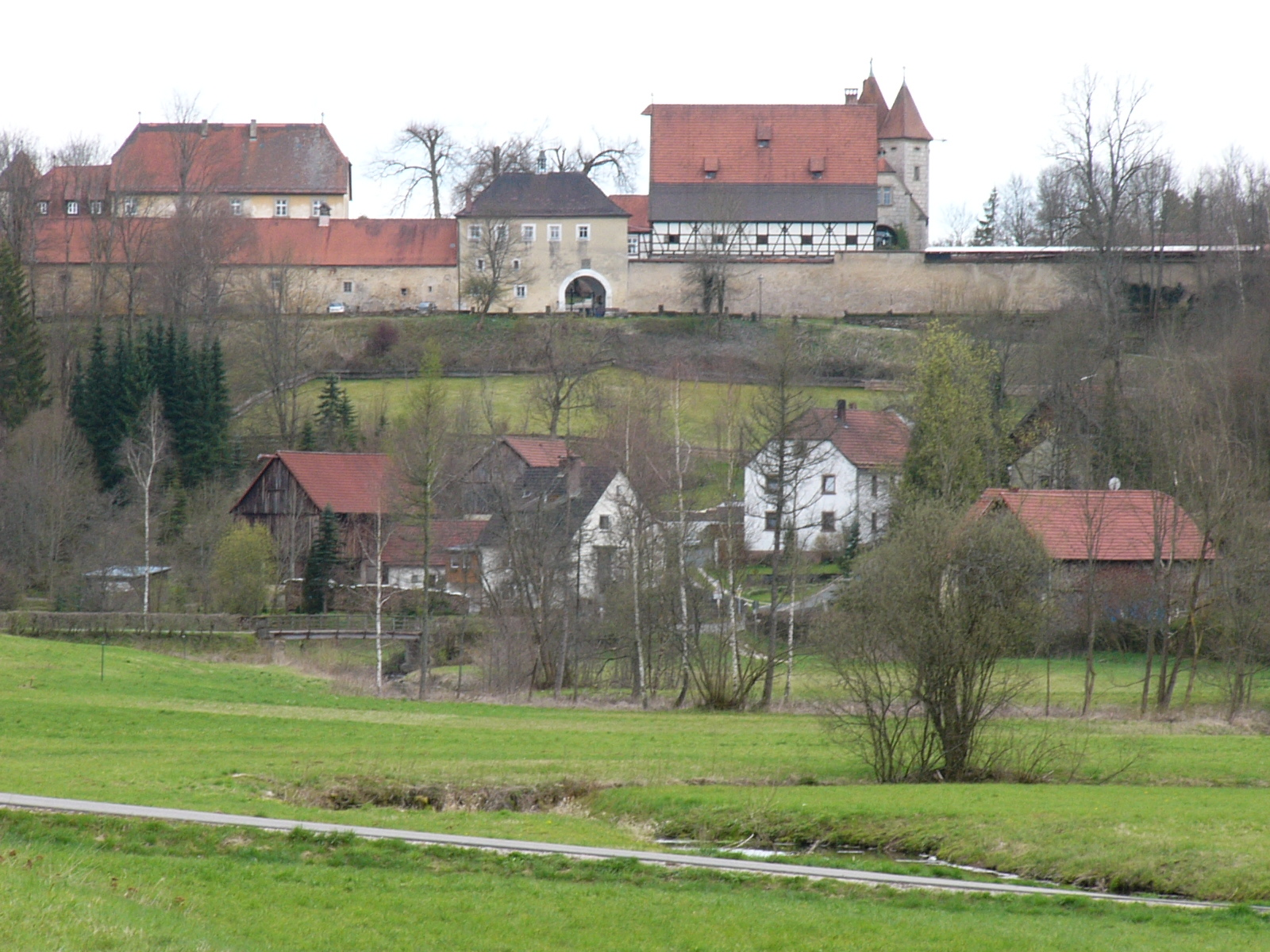
Oberaufseß
