= Gesees =

- Municipality
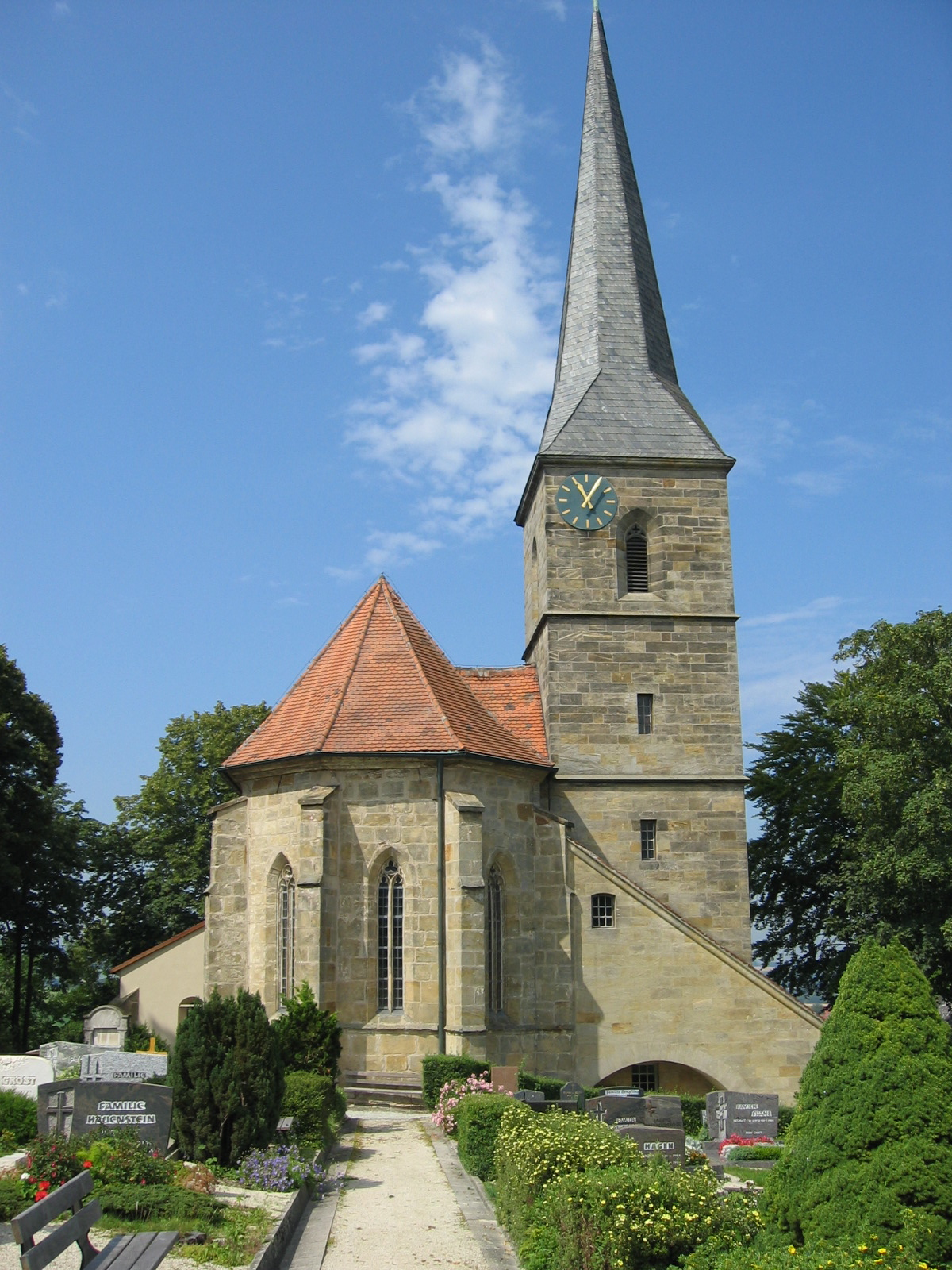
- Fortified Church of the Virgin Mary

- Coat of arms

- Location of Gesees within Bayreuth district
- Interactive map of Gesees
- Location within Germany Location within Bavaria
- Coordinates: 49°53′54.85″N 11°32′16.06″E
- Country: Germany
- State: Bavaria
- Admin. region: Oberfranken
- District: Bayreuth
- Municipal assoc.: Mistelbach
- Subdivisions: 7 Ortsteile

Government
  - Mayor (2020–26): Harald Feulner

Area
  - Total: 10.44 km^{2} (4.03 sq mi)
- Elevation: 450 m (1,480 ft)

Population (2025-12-31)
  - Total: 1,258
  - Density: 120.5/km^{2} (312.1/sq mi)
- Time zone: UTC+01:00 (CET)
  - Summer (DST): UTC+02:00 (CEST)
- Postal codes: 95494
- Dialling codes: 09201
- Vehicle registration: BT
- Website: www.gesees.de

Gesees is a municipality in the district of Bayreuth in Bavaria in Germany.
