= Hummeltal =

- Municipality
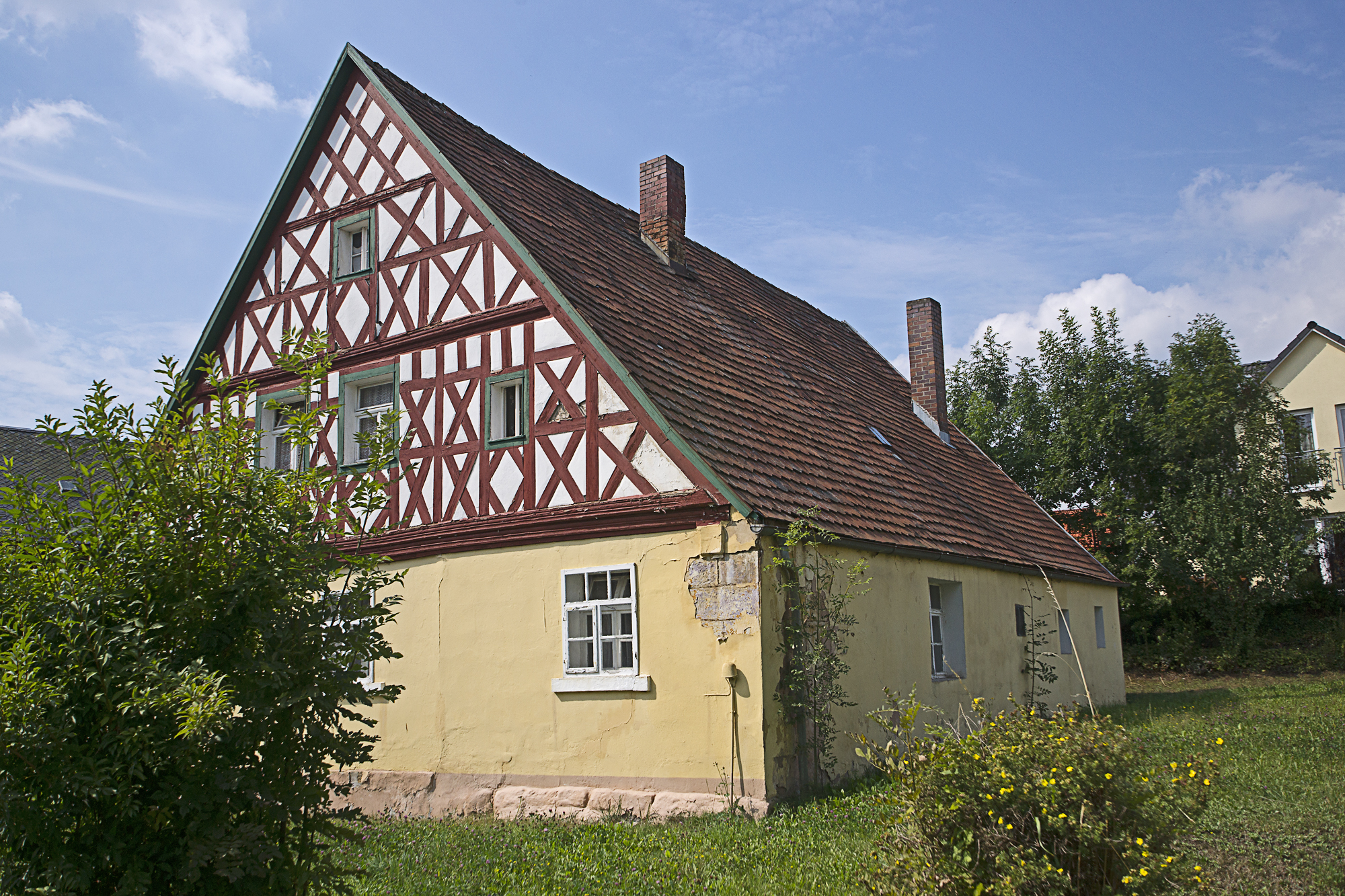
- Fachwerkhaus in Hummeltal

- Coat of arms

- Location of Hummeltal within Bayreuth district
- Interactive map of Hummeltal
- Location within Germany Location within Bavaria
- Coordinates: 49°53′24.94″N 11°30′37.00″E
- Country: Germany
- State: Bavaria
- Admin. region: Oberfranken
- District: Bayreuth
- Municipal assoc.: Mistelbach
- Subdivisions: 20 Ortsteile

Government
  - Mayor (2020–26): Patrick Meyer (CSU)

Area
  - Total: 21.91 km^{2} (8.46 sq mi)
- Elevation: 389–580 m (1,276–1,903 ft)

Population (2025-12-31)
  - Total: 2,420
  - Density: 110/km^{2} (286/sq mi)
- Time zone: UTC+01:00 (CET)
  - Summer (DST): UTC+02:00 (CEST)
- Postal codes: 95503
- Dialling codes: 09201
- Vehicle registration: BT
- Website: www.hummeltal.de

Hummeltal is a municipality in the district of Bayreuth in Bavaria in Germany.
