= Glashütten, Bavaria =

Glashütten
- Municipality
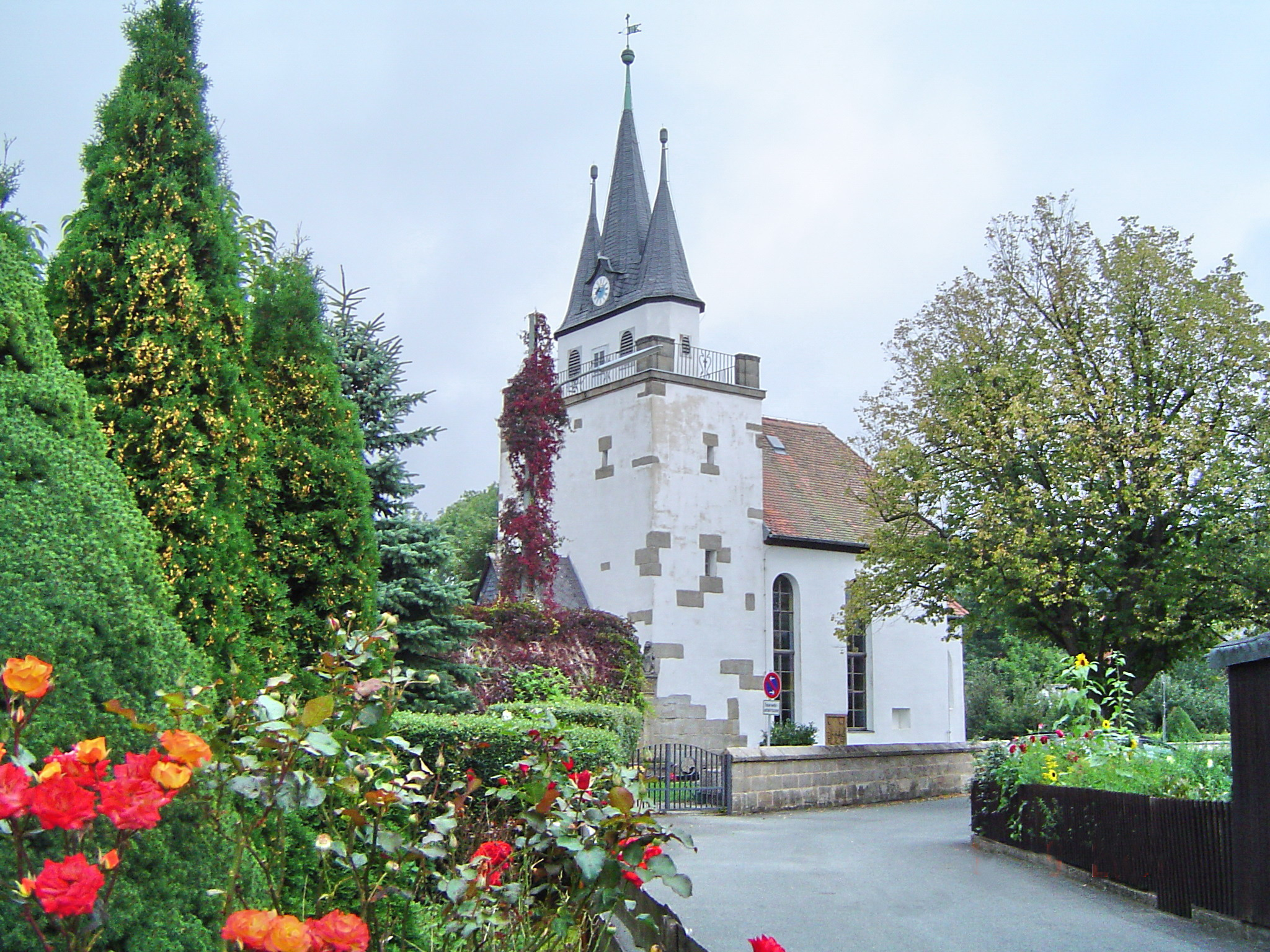
- Church of Saint Bartholomew

- Coat of arms

- Location of Glashütten within Bayreuth district
- Interactive map of Glashütten
- Location within Germany Location within Bavaria
- Coordinates: 49°53′19.70″N 11°26′54.72″E
- Country: Germany
- State: Bavaria
- Admin. region: Oberfranken
- District: Bayreuth
- Municipal assoc.: Mistelgau

Government
  - Mayor (2020–26): Sven Ruhl

Area
  - Total: 3.53 km^{2} (1.36 sq mi)
- Elevation: 421 m (1,381 ft)

Population (2025-12-31)
  - Total: 1,281
  - Density: 363/km^{2} (940/sq mi)
- Time zone: UTC+01:00 (CET)
  - Summer (DST): UTC+02:00 (CEST)
- Postal codes: 95496
- Dialling codes: 09279
- Vehicle registration: BT
- Website: www.glashuetten.de

Glashütten is a municipality in the district of Bayreuth in Bavaria in Germany.
