= Bayreuth (district) =

Coordinates: 49°55′N 11°30′E

- District
- Flag Coat of arms
- Country: Germany
- State: Bavaria
- Adm. region: Upper Franconia
- Capital: Bayreuth

Government
  - District admin.: Florian Wiedemann (FW)

Area
  - Total: 1,273 km^{2} (492 sq mi)

Population (31 December 2025)
  - Total: 102,756
  - Density: 80.72/km^{2} (209.1/sq mi)
- Time zone: UTC+01:00 (CET)
  - Summer (DST): UTC+02:00 (CEST)
- Vehicle registration: BT, EBS, ESB, KEM, MÜB, PEG
- Website: www.landkreis-bayreuth.de

Bayreuth (German pronunciation: [baɪˈʁɔʏt]) is a Landkreis (district) in Bavaria, Germany. It surrounds, but does not include the city of Bayreuth. The district is bounded by (from the north and clockwise) the districts of Kulmbach, Hof, Wunsiedel, Tirschenreuth, Neustadt an der Waldnaab, Amberg-Sulzbach, Nürnberger Land, Forchheim, Bamberg and Lichtenfels.

== History ==
The district was established in 1972 by merging the former districts of Bayreuth and Pegnitz, adding the town Gefrees of the former district of Münchberg and the town of Speichersdorf of the former district of Kemnath.

== Geography ==
The sources of the White Main and the Red Main are both located in the district. The Red Main rises in the very south in the hills of the Frankish Alb, the White Main has its source in the Fichtel Mountains in the east. Both rivers run to the northwest, but do not meet within the district's borders.

The valley of the Red Main separates the two major geographical regions of the district from each other: the hilly countryside of the Franconian Jura and the much higher Fichtel Mountains.

Within the county lies the Veldenstein Forest, one of the largest contiguous areas of woodland in Bavaria.

== Coat of arms ==
The arms display the heraldic eagle of the Hohenzollern dynasty together with the white and blue pattern of Bavaria.

== Towns and municipalities ==
Clickable map of towns and municipalities in the district

Towns
1. Bad Berneck i. F.
2. Gefrees
3. Goldkronach
4. Pegnitz
5. Pottenstein
6. Waischenfeld
Municipalities
1. Ahorntal
2. Bindlach
3. Bischofsgrün
4. Eckersdorf
5. Fichtelberg

6. Heinersreuth
7. Mehlmeisel
8. Speichersdorf
9. Warmensteinach

Verwaltungsgemeinschaften
1. Betzenstein; 1. Betzenstein^{1,2}; 2. Plech^{3}; 2. Creußen; 1. Creußen^{1,2}; 2. Haag; 3. Prebitz; 4. Schnabelwaid^{3}	3. Hollfeld; 1. Aufseß; 2. Hollfeld^{1,2}; 3. Plankenfels; 4. Mistelbach; 1. Gesees; 2. Hummeltal; 3. Mistelbach^{1}	5. Mistelgau; 1. Glashütten; 2. Mistelgau^{1}; 6. Weidenberg; 1. Emtmannsberg; 2. Kirchenpingarten; 3. Seybothenreuth; 4. Weidenberg^{1,3}
^{1}seat of the Verwaltungsgemeinschaft; ^{2}town; ^{3}Markt

== Sights ==
Schloss Aufseß	Aufseß
Schloss Fantaisie	Eckersdorf
Schloss Freienfels	Hollfeld
Hollfeld	Hollfeld
Pegnitz	Pegnitz
Burg Pottenstein	Pottenstein
Teufelshöhle	Pottenstein
Tüchersfeld	Pottenstein
Burg Waischenfeld	Waischenfeld
Schloss Wiesentfels	Hollfeld
