= Hollfeld =

- Town
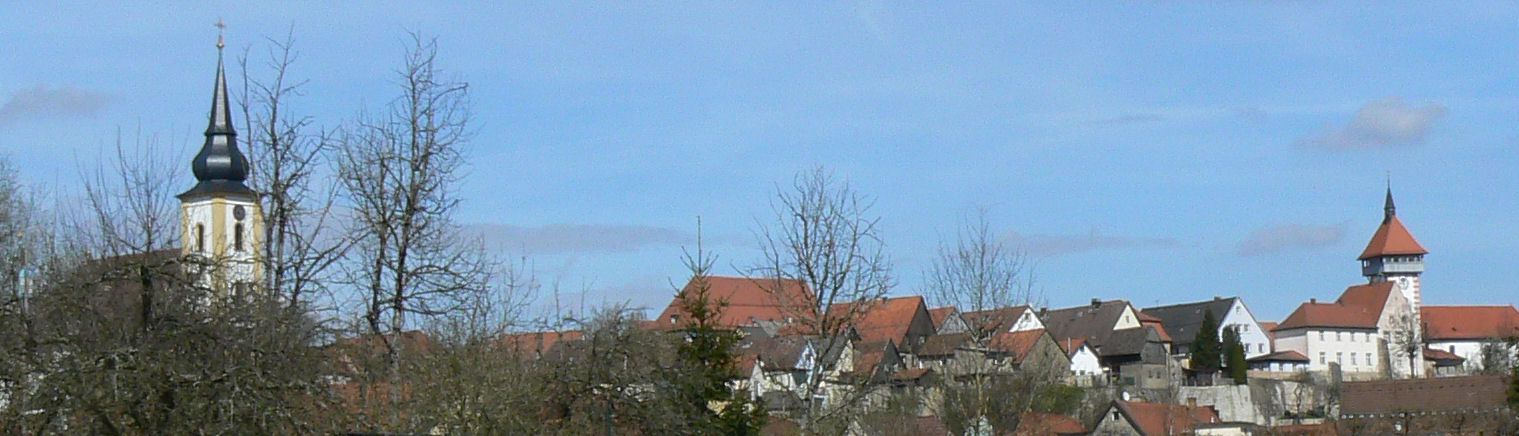
- Panorama of the Old Town of Hollfeld

- Coat of arms

- Location of Hollfeld within Bayreuth district
- Interactive map of Hollfeld
- Location within Germany Location within Bavaria
- Coordinates: 49°56′N 11°18′E
- Country: Germany
- State: Bavaria
- Admin. region: Oberfranken
- District: Bayreuth
- Municipal assoc.: Hollfeld

Government
  - Mayor (2020–26): Hartmut Stern

Area
  - Total: 80.65 km^{2} (31.14 sq mi)
- Elevation: 403 m (1,322 ft)

Population (2025-12-31)
  - Total: 4,769
  - Density: 59.13/km^{2} (153.2/sq mi)
- Time zone: UTC+01:00 (CET)
  - Summer (DST): UTC+02:00 (CEST)
- Postal codes: 96142
- Dialling codes: 09274
- Vehicle registration: BT
- Website: www.hollfeld.de

Hollfeld (German pronunciation: [ˈhɔlˌfɛlt]) is a town in the district of Bayreuth, in Bavaria, Germany.

It is situated 20 km west of Bayreuth, and 30 km east of Bamberg.

== Sport ==
The town's association football club, ASV Hollfeld, experienced its greatest success in 2012 when it qualified for the new northern division of the expanded Bayernliga, the fifth tier of the German football league system, where it played for two seasons until 2014.

== Gallery ==
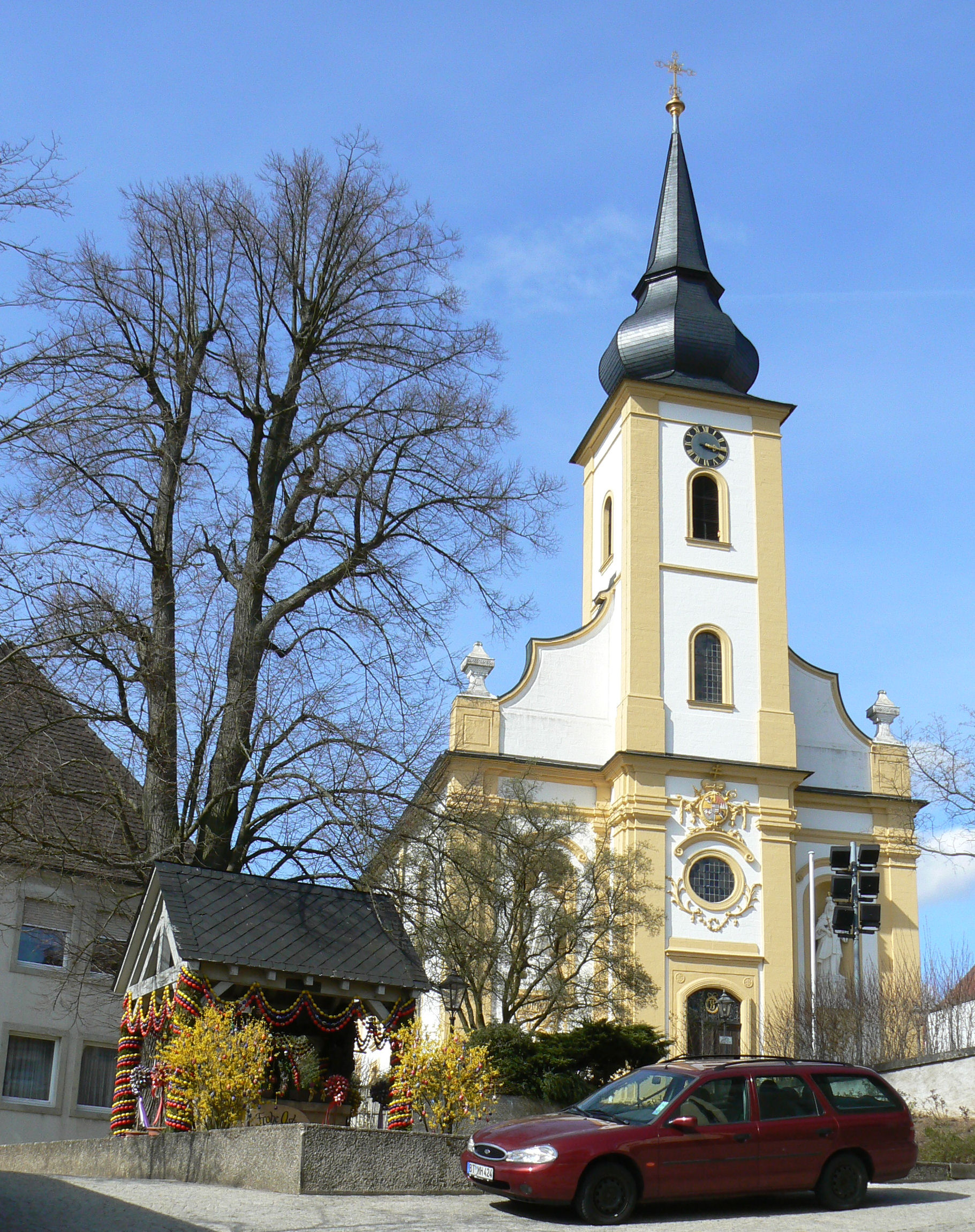
Mariä Himmelfahrt

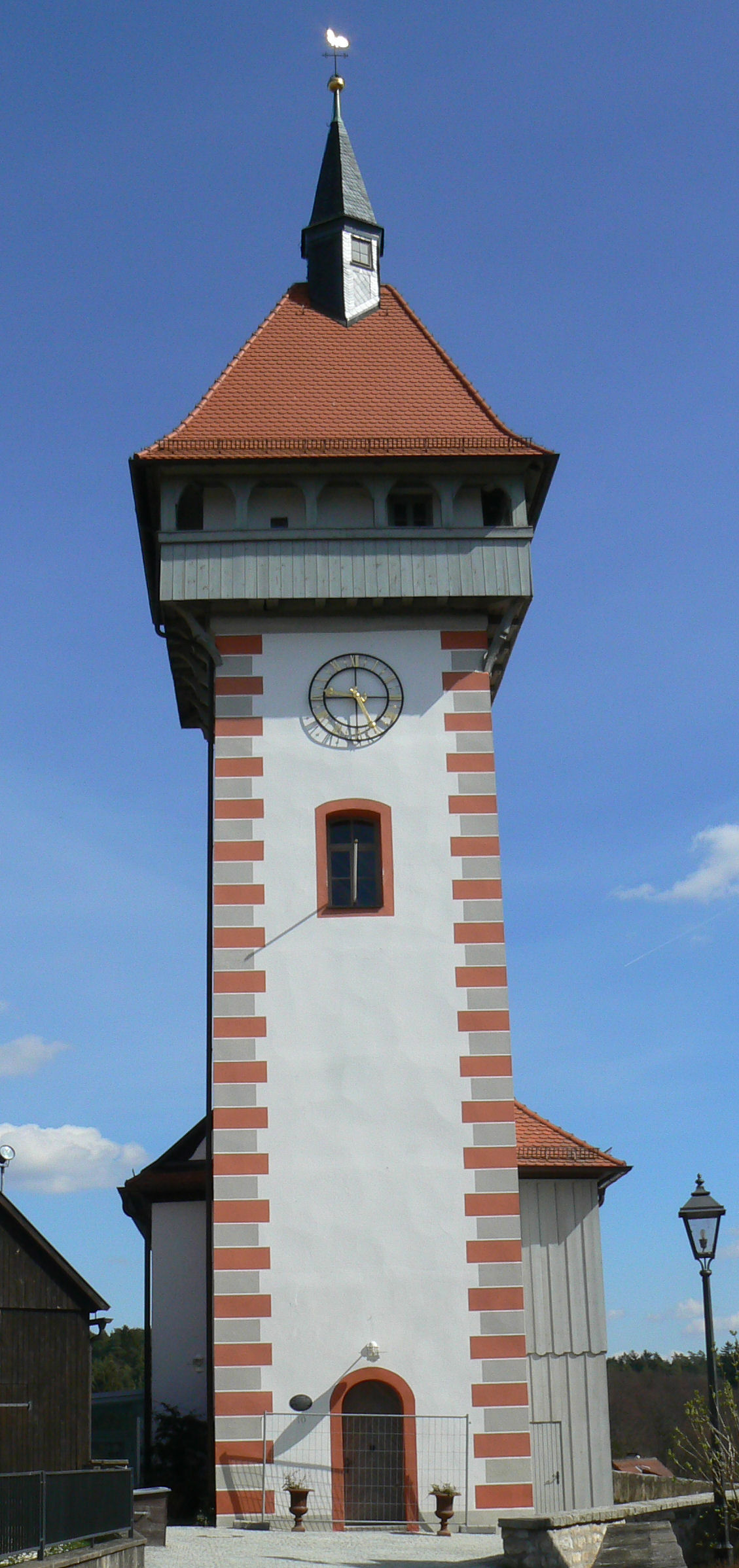
Gangolfsturm

== Villages ==
Drosendorf	Fernreuth	Freienfels	Gottelhof	Hainbach	Höfen	Hollfeld
Kainach	Krögelstein	Loch	Moggendorf	Neidenstein	Pilgerndorf	Schönfeld
Stechendorf	Tiefenlesau	Treppendorf	Weiher	Welkendorf	Wiesentfels	Wohnsdorf
