= Plankenfels =

- Municipality
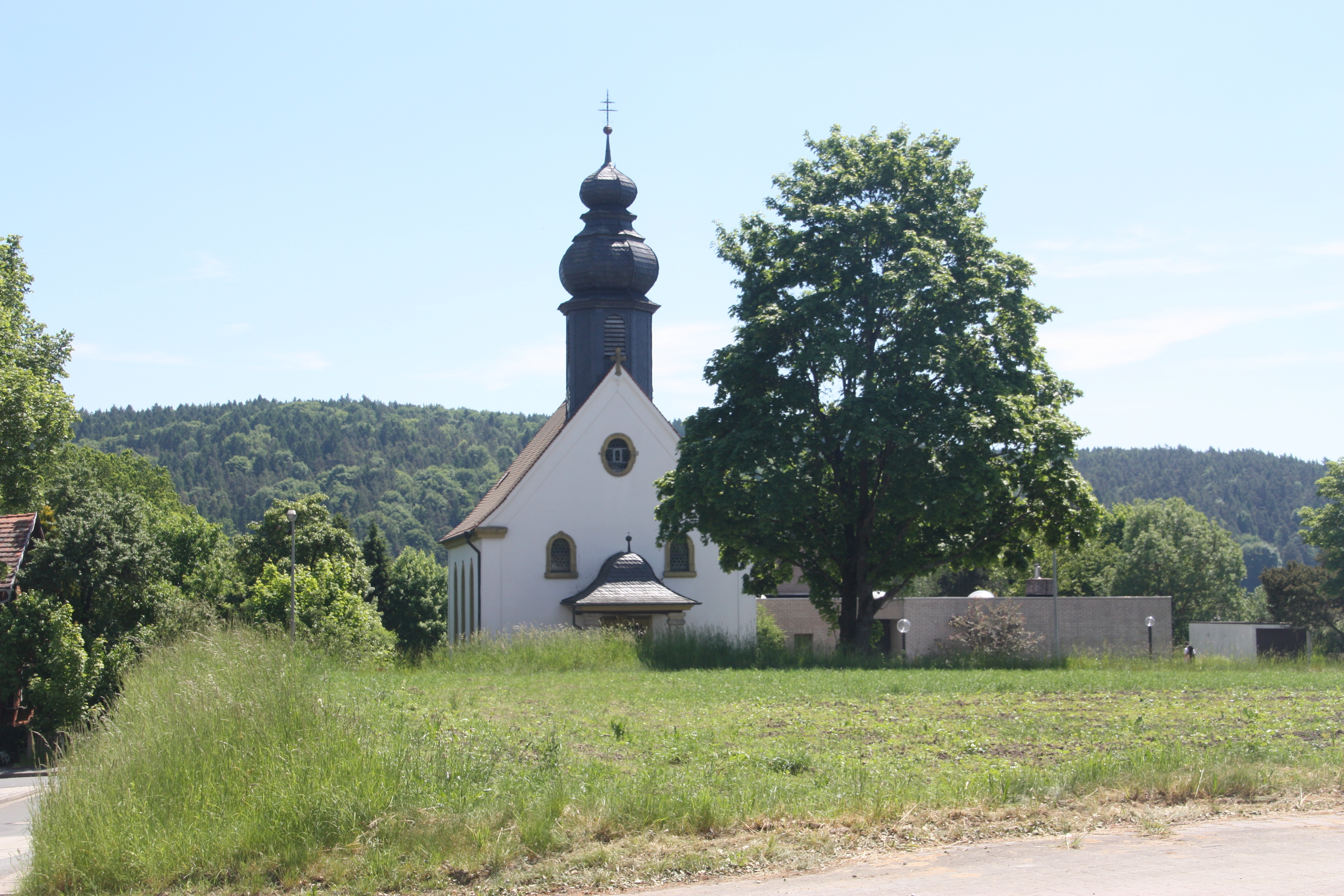
- Church of Saint Henry

- Coat of arms

- Location of Plankenfels within Bayreuth district
- Interactive map of Plankenfels
- Location within Germany Location within Bavaria
- Coordinates: 49°53′N 11°20′E
- Country: Germany
- State: Bavaria
- Admin. region: Oberfranken
- District: Bayreuth
- Municipal assoc.: Hollfeld
- Subdivisions: 12 Ortsteile

Government
  - Mayor (2020–26): Harald Wich (CSU)

Area
  - Total: 14.01 km^{2} (5.41 sq mi)
- Elevation: 390 m (1,280 ft)

Population (2025-12-31)
  - Total: 837
  - Density: 59.7/km^{2} (155/sq mi)
- Time zone: UTC+01:00 (CET)
  - Summer (DST): UTC+02:00 (CEST)
- Postal codes: 95515
- Dialling codes: 09204
- Vehicle registration: BT
- Website: www.plankenfels.de

Plankenfels is a municipality in the district of Bayreuth in Bavaria in Germany.

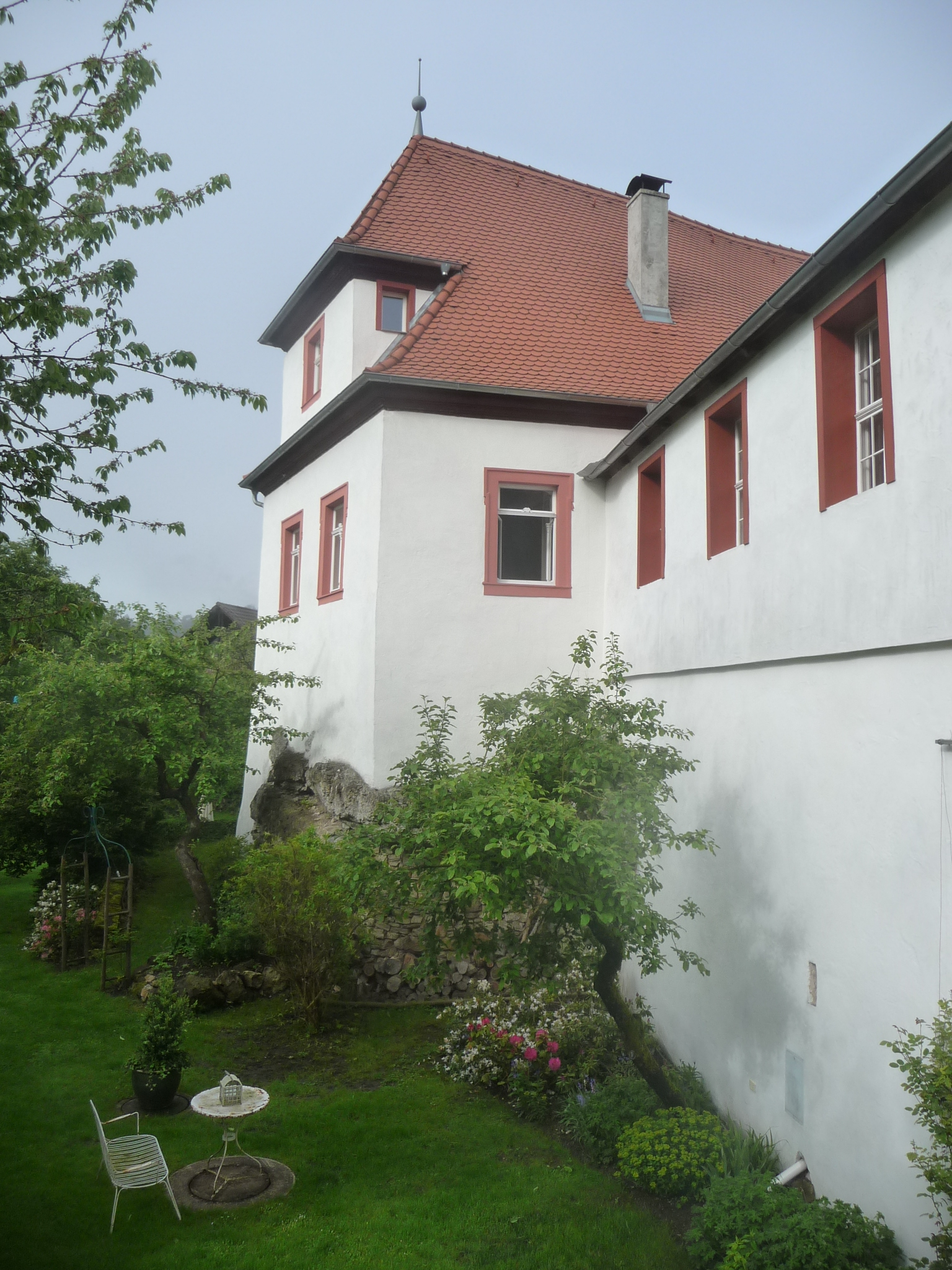
Plankenfels castle
