= Schloss Fantaisie =

Coordinates: 49°56′01″N 11°30′33″E

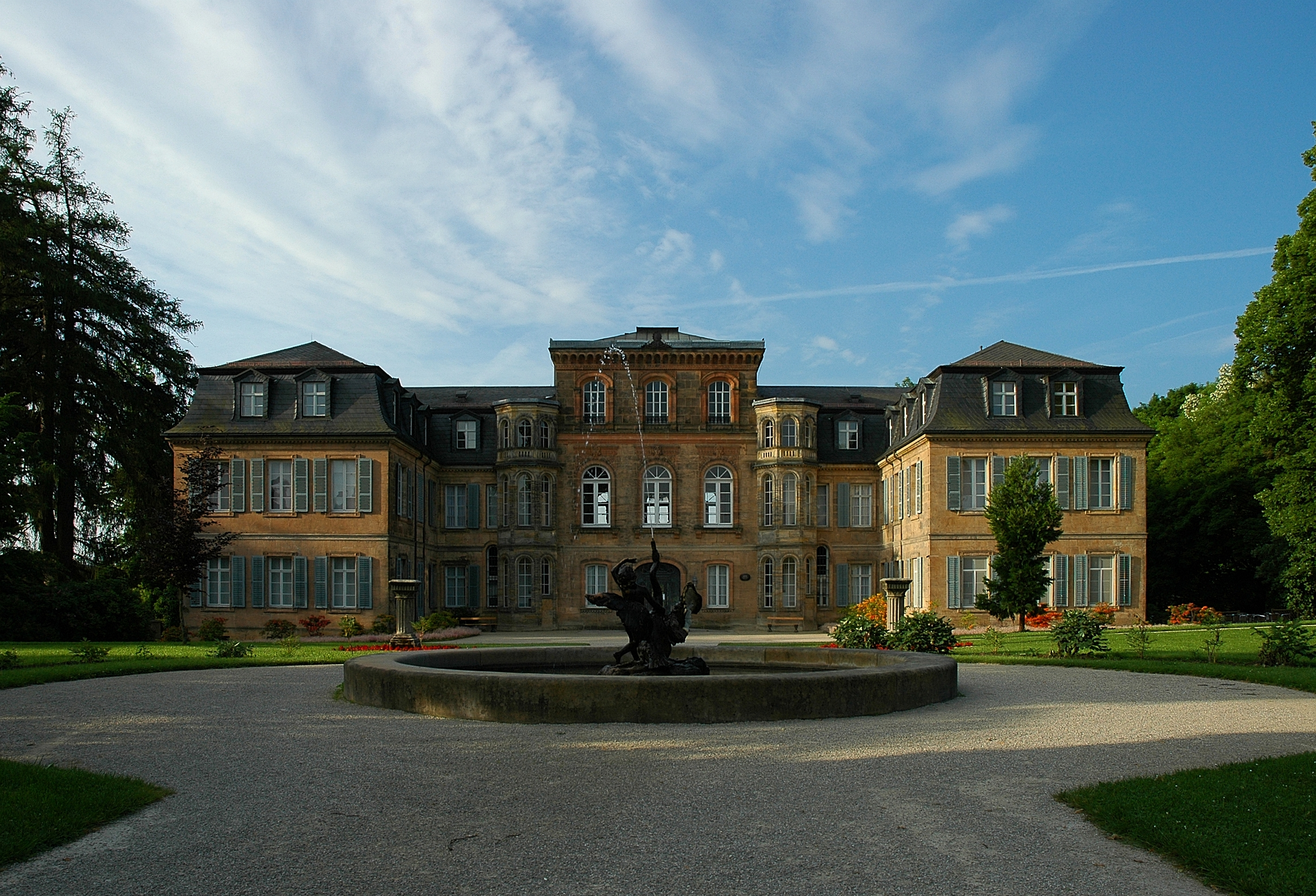
Schloss Fantaisie (north facade)

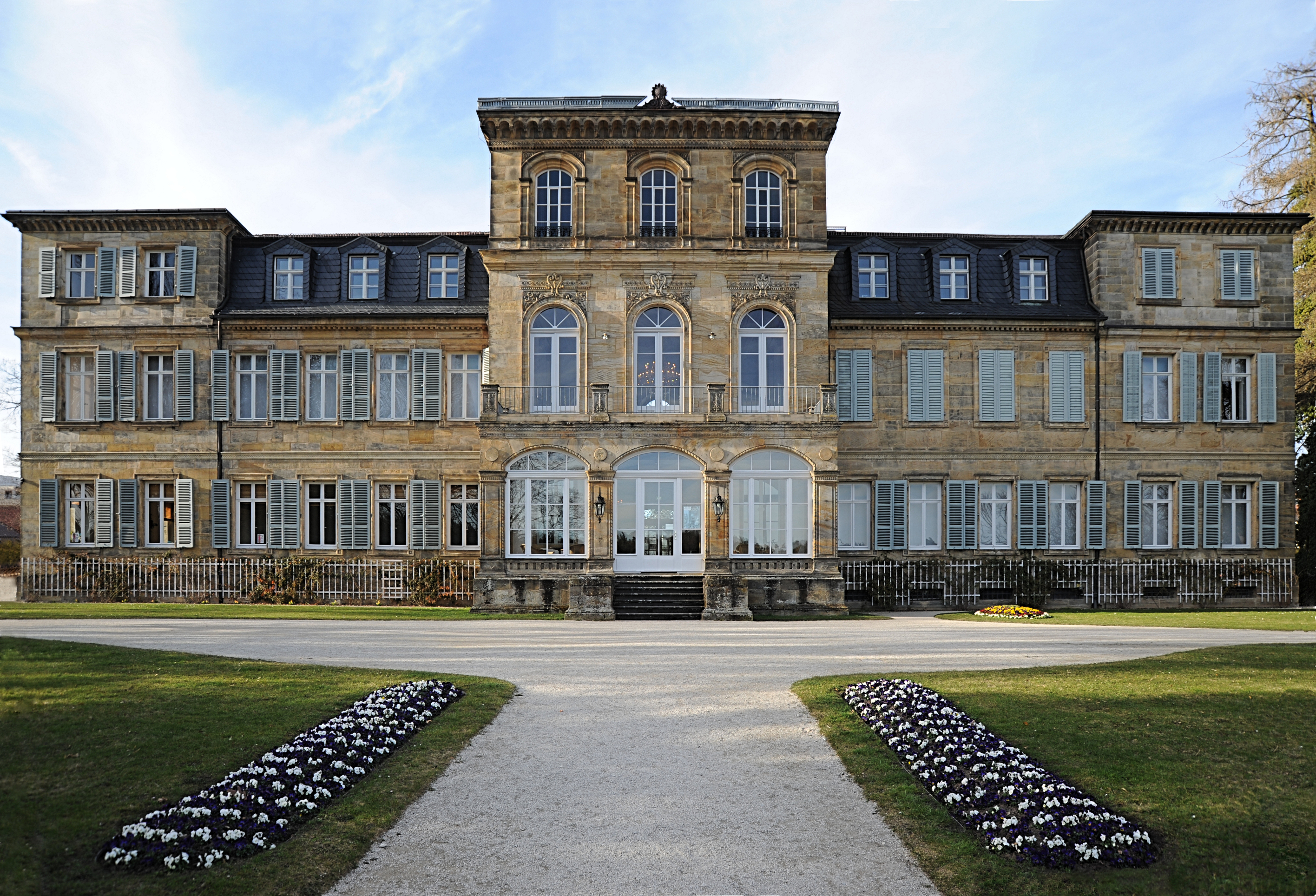
Schloss Fantaisie (south facade)

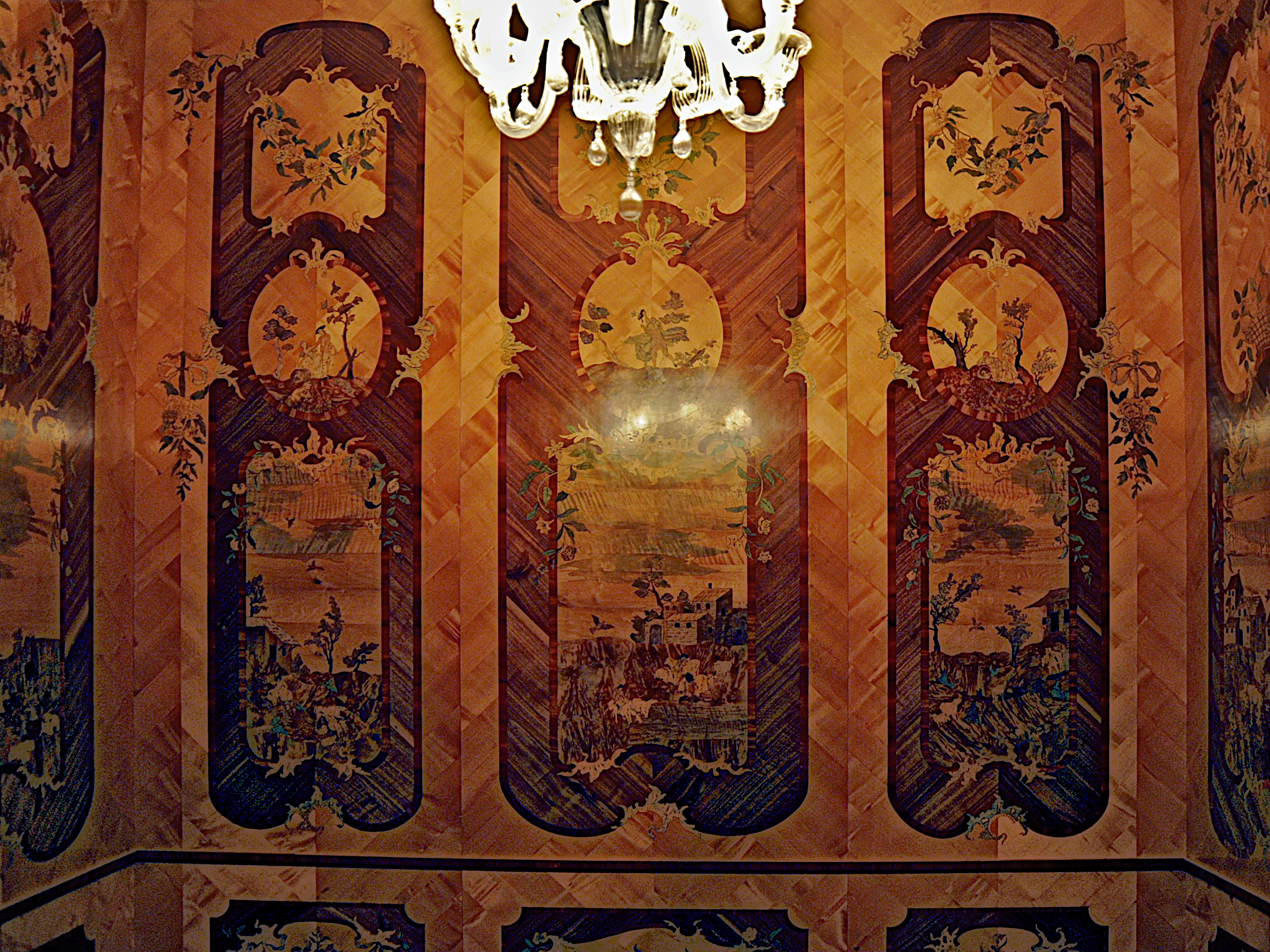
View into the "Spindler-Kabinett"

The Schloss Fantaisie is a castle, situated 3.1 miles west of the city Bayreuth in the community Eckersdorf.

The roots of this castle are in the medieval, but there is not much left from this time. In the 16th century the Lords of Lüchau (Lüchauer Herren) built a plain Renaissance Castle. When Friedrich Ludwig von Lüchau died in 1757, the castle fell back to Frederick, Margrave of Brandenburg-Bayreuth.

In 1761 he started to build a new castle at the same location as an additional summer residence. The building was inspired from impressions of an Italian journey of the Margrave couple Wilhelmine and Frederick, Margrave of Brandenburg-Bayreuth.

In the year 1763 the Margraves only daughter Fredericka Sophie inherited the castle. She used the name Fantaisie for her castle and authorized the builder Johann Jakob Spindler to continue the building. Because of many modifications there is not much left from the original castle but you can see a replica of the "Spindler-Kabinett", a wooden room with intarsia work of the brothers Johann Friedrich and Heinrich Wilhelm Spindler.

In the autumn of 1937, Gauleiter Wächtler oversaw the remodeling of the palace for its conversion into the Reichsschule des NS-Lehrerbundes. The architects for the project were Alfred Locke of Bayreuth and Ernst Max Jahn of Leipzig. In early 1938, an article appeared in Modern Bauformen showing the newly created interiors.

Since 2000 Schloss Fantaisie has been the first German garden museum, exclusively devoted to the history of garden design.
