= Old palace, Eremitage =

Architectural heritage monument in the city of Bayreuth, Bavaria, Germany

Coordinates: 49.9489°N 11.6249°E

The old palace (German: das alte Schloß) is one of the two castles within the historic Hermitage Park to the east of the St. Johannis district of the German city of Bayreuth. The building should not be confused with the Old Palace in the city center.

== History ==
=== Early history ===
The forest area, which had previously been church property as a parish forest, came into the possession of the margraves of Bayreuth through purchase in 1616 . From 1664, Margrave Christian Ernst originally had a hunting park here, and later had a "house of grottoes and fountains" laid out.

The old castle was built from 1715 on the order of Margrave Georg Wilhelm as a summer house. The architect was probably the agricultural inspector Johann David Räntz the Elder, a student of Paul Decker. Supervising construction fell to Johann Heinrich Endrich, who later built his own dwelling on the edge of the park (later known as Monplaisir). The castle was built as a four-wing complex, which was entered through a small grotto on the south. In addition to the rooms of the margrave couple, there was also a ballroom in the north wing, while the east and west wings contained simple hermit apartments. The palace was surrounded by linden trees, and there was a parterre in front of the ballroom.

The Hermitage was reserved for the Margrave and a few courtiers. The court reenacted life as a hermit (hence the name "hermitage"): during the day they stayed as hermits in the hermit houses scattered in the forest and met in the ballroom of the castle in the evenings.

=== Conversion by Margravine Wilhelmine ===
In 1735, Margrave Friedrich gave his wife Wilhelmine the Hermitage for her birthday, after which she had the palace expanded. She left Georg Wilhelm's structure untouched, but changed it to suit her purposes: the Hermitage was to become a place of inner contemplation. Thus, the north side was expanded by 5 rooms each, so that the margrave and margravine now each had an entire apartment. While the hermit cells remained in the Margrave's wing, those in the ladies' wing became Wilhelmine's artistic study. However, the ruin character of the facade was retained. Among the rooms added by Margravine Wilhelmine is the Japanese Cabinet, two of whose lacquer panels were gifts from Wilhelmine's brother Frederick the Great, the Music Room and the Chinese Mirror Shards Cabinet, in which she wrote her memoirs.

=== 19th century to date ===
After Bayreuth became part of Prussia in 1791, the Prussian minister Karl August von Hardenberg first lived in the Hermitage during the summer months, and from 1806 Princess Friederike von Solms-Braunfels lived there. She is said to have purchased new furniture for the Old Palace and commissioned some repairs, but the refurnishing was incomplete because Bayreuth was conquered by Napoleon in the autumn of the same year.

In 1810 Bayreuth became part of Bavaria, after which the Hermitage was often used as a vacation home for members of the Bavarian royal family. From 1823, Duke Pius spent his summers in the Hermitage. In 1851, King Maximilian II visited the Hermitage with his family for a few weeks and had renovations carried out. King Ludwig II last stayed in the Old Palace of the Hermitage during the Wagner Festival in 1876.

=== Inner Grotto in the Old Castle ===
The old palace was restored from 1928 to 1935, but the measures partly distorted the historical conditions. From 2005 to 2009 the old castle was restored again, and can be visited again as part of guided tours.
