= Frederick, Margrave of Brandenburg-Bayreuth =

Frederick
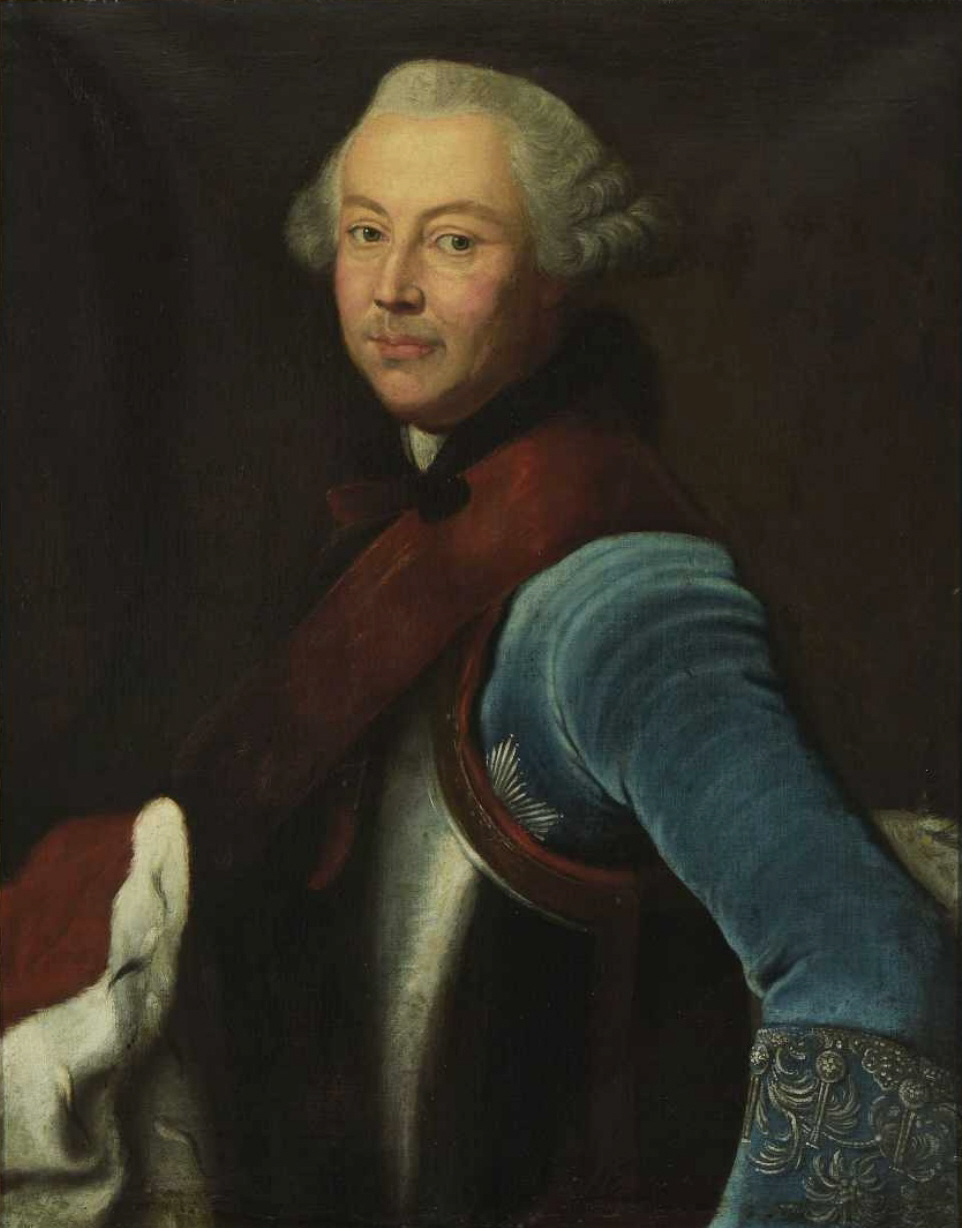
- Portrait, c. 1760

Margrave of Brandenburg-Bayreuth
- Reign: 17 May 1735 - 26 February 1763
- Born: 10 May 1711; Weferlingen, Principality of Anhalt, Holy Roman Empire
- Died: 26 February 1763 (aged 51); Bayreuth, Margraviate of Brandenburg-Bayreuth, Holy Roman Empire
- Spouse: Wilhelmine of Prussia (m. 1731; died 1758) Duchess Sophie Caroline Marie of Brunswick-Wolfenbüttel (m. 1759)
- Issue: Elisabeth Friederike Sophie
- House: Hohenzollern
- Father: George Frederick Charles, Margrave of Brandenburg-Bayreuth
- Mother: Princess Dorothea of Schleswig-Holstein-Sonderburg-Beck

Frederick (Friedrich) Margrave of Brandenburg-Bayreuth (10 May 1711 in Weferlingen – 26 February 1763 in Bayreuth), was a member of the House of Hohenzollern and Margrave of Brandenburg-Bayreuth.

He was the eldest son of George Frederick Karl, nominal Margrave of Brandenburg-Bayreuth-Kulmbach, by his wife Dorothea of Schleswig-Holstein-Sonderburg-Beck.

== Life ==
Born a minor member of the house of Brandenburg-Bayreuth, Frederick's fate changed in 1726, when his father inherited the principality of Bayreuth after a long dispute with the kingdom of Prussia over his rights of succession. The sixteen-year-old Frederick became the Hereditary Margrave of Bayreuth. In 1735, on his father's death, Frederick became the new Margrave of Brandenburg-Bayreuth.

Frederick has the reputation of being an enlightened monarch. In Bayreuth, Frederick is referred to as "the Beloved." In his residence of Bayreuth, he promoted the sciences and arts and owned numerous buildings. Frederick received a good education and studied eight years at the Calvinistic Genovese University. Frederick was totally unprepared for his tasks as a sovereign, however, because his father and his ministers had completely excluded him from all the government affairs.

His wife, Wilhelmine, with her strong personality, tried to influence the weak and unstable Frederick in favour of Prussia, her homeland, but she was not able to overcome the influence of his ministers. His wife finally did succeed in gaining influence, however, and a young secretary, Philipp Elrodt, was appointed to handle financial matters. His position soon became more equivalent to "prime minister." In this role, Philipp attacked government corruption and cronyism, uncovered irregularities in the finances of the margraviate, retired old debts, and identified new sources of income. As a result of this fiscal reform, Frederick was able to increase Wilhelmine's allowance, and she purchased a summer residence called the Eremitage.

The cultured margrave showed his appreciation of art and science by establishing the margraviate's Regional University in Bayreuth in 1742, which was moved one year later, in 1743, to Erlangen. Therefore, the University of Erlangen bears his name (German: Friedrich) until today. In addition, he created the Bayreuth Academy of Arts (German: Bayreuther Kunstakademie) in 1756 and from 1744 to 1748 allowed it to establish the Margravial Opera House (German: Markgräfliches Opernhaus) as a richly appointed baroque theater in Bayreuth. Numerous other construction projects were also completed, including the transformation and extension of the existing Eremitage Museum into the New Eremitage Museum Castle with the Temple of the Sun (1749–1753) and the building of the new Margravial Castle (1754) after the old castle had burned. The new castle was finished after the death of his first wife; in her honour, the castle was renamed after her. In 1756 at sixteen years of age, the composer Anna Bon (di Vinezia) dedicated her six op. 1 flute sonatas to Friedrich.

Frederick was appointed Generalfeldmarschall of the Franconian Circle, but kept his country out of disputes between Austria and Prussia, even during the Seven Years' War.

== Marriages and issue ==
In Berlin on 20 November 1731, Frederick married Wilhelmine of Prussia. He had been betrothed to Wilhelmine's younger sister, Sophie, but King Frederick Wilhelm I decided to have his oldest surviving daughter, Wilhelmine, marry him at the last moment. The groom was not consulted in this decision.

From the beginning, the marriage went well. The young couple liked each other, and Wilhelmine ignored his lisp. Although Wilhelmine was not particularly beautiful, she had a cheerful, intellectual and pleasant personality. She described Frederick as good-hearted and charitable, but also a little frivolous. The union produced only one child, a daughter:

1. Elisabeth Friederike Sophie (b. Bayreuth, 30 August 1732 – d. Bayreuth, 6 April 1780). Described by Giacomo Casanova as the most beautiful girl in Germany, she was married on 26 September 1748 to Karl Eugen, Duke of Württemberg. After producing a short-living daughter, Princess Fredericka Wilhelmine Augusta Luisa Charlotte of Württemberg, they were separated in 1756, but never divorced.

In Brunswick, on 20 September 1759, about a year after Wilhelmine's death from illness, Frederick married Duchess Sophie Caroline Marie of Brunswick-Wolfenbüttel. Their marriage was childless. Without any male issue, he was succeeded on his death by his uncle, Frederick Christian.

Frederick also had a mistress, Wilhelmine Dorothee von der Marwitz.

== Ancestry ==
Ancestors of Frederick, Margrave of Brandenburg-Bayreuth

16. Christian, Margrave of Brandenburg-Bayreuth
8. Georg Albrecht, Margrave of Brandenburg-Bayreuth-Kulmbach
17. Marie of Prussia
4. Christian Heinrich, Margrave of Brandenburg-Bayreuth-Kulmbach
18. Philip, Duke of Schleswig-Holstein-Sonderburg-Glücksburg
9. Marie Elisabeth of Schleswig-Holstein-Sonderburg-Glücksburg
19. Sophie Hedwig of Saxe-Lauenburg
2. George Frederick Charles, Margrave of Brandenburg-Bayreuth
20. Johann Friedrich, Count of Wolfstein
10. Albrecht Friedrich, Count of Wolfstein
21. Baroness Barbara Teufel von Guntersdorf
5. Sophie Christiane of Wolfstein
22. Wolfgang Georg I, Count of Castell-Remlingen
11. Countess Sophie Luise of Castell-Remlingen
23. Countess Sophie Juliana of Hohenlohe-Waldenburg-Pfedelbach
1. Frederick, Margrave of Brandenburg-Bayreuth
24. Alexander, Duke of Schleswig-Holstein-Sonderburg
12. August Philipp, Duke of Schleswig-Holstein-Sonderburg-Beck
25. Dorothea of Schwarzburg-Sondershausen
6. Frederick Louis, Duke of Schleswig-Holstein-Sonderburg-Beck
26. William Louis, Count of Nassau-Saarbrücken
13. Marie Sibylle of Nassau-Saarbrücken
27. Anna Amalia of Baden-Durlach
3. Princess Dorothea of Schleswig-Holstein-Sonderburg-Beck
28. Alexander, Duke of Schleswig-Holstein-Sonderburg (= 24)
14. Ernest Günther, Duke of Schleswig-Holstein-Sonderburg-Augustenburg
29. Dorothea of Schwarzburg-Sondershausen (= 25)
7. Louise Charlotte of Schleswig-Holstein-Sonderburg-Augustenburg
30. Philip, Duke of Schleswig-Holstein-Sonderburg-Glücksburg (= 18)
15. Augusta of Schleswig-Holstein-Sonderburg-Glücksburg
31. Sophie Hedwig of Saxe-Lauenburg (= 19)

== In fiction ==
- Frederick is a main character in the 1909 historical novel A Gentle Knight of Old Brandenburg by Charles Major (its central character is his wife Wilhelmine - see).

Frederick, Margrave of Brandenburg-Bayreuth House of Hohenzollern Born: 10 May 1711 Died: 26 February 1763
Preceded by Georg Frederick Karl	Margrave of Brandenburg-Bayreuth; 1735–1763	Succeeded by Frederick Christian
