= Princess Sophie Caroline of Brunswick-Wolfenbüttel =

Sophie Caroline of Brunswick-Wolfenbüttel
- Margravine of Brandenburg-Bayreuth
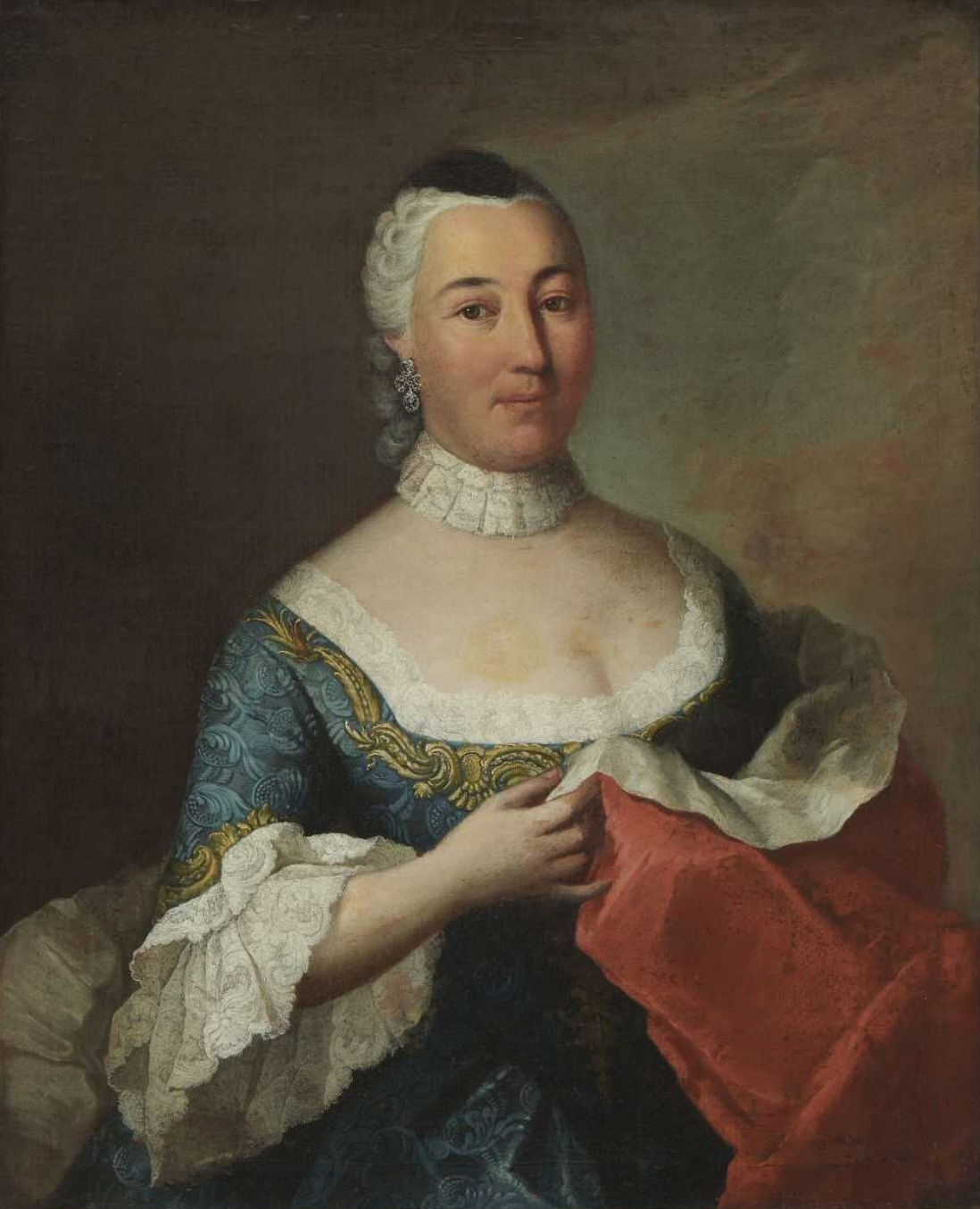
- Portrait of Sophie Caroline c. 1760
- Born: 7 October 1737; Wolfenbüttel, Duchy of Brunswick-Lüneburg
- Died: 22 December 1817 (aged 80); Erlangen, Kingdom of Bavaria
- Spouse: Frederick, Margrave of Brandenburg-Bayreuth (m. 1759; died 1763)
Names
- German: Sophie Karoline Marie
- House: House of Brunswick-Bevern
- Father: Charles I, Duke of Brunswick-Wolfenbüttel
- Mother: Princess Philippine Charlotte of Prussia

Duchess Sophie Caroline Marie of Brunswick-Wolfenbüttel (German: Sophie Karoline Marie; 7 October 1737 – 22 December 1817) was Margravine of Brandenburg-Bayreuth by marriage to Frederick, Margrave of Brandenburg-Bayreuth. She was the eldest daughter of Charles I, Duke of Brunswick-Wolfenbüttel, and his wife, Philippine Charlotte of Prussia, sister of Frederick the Great.

== Biography ==
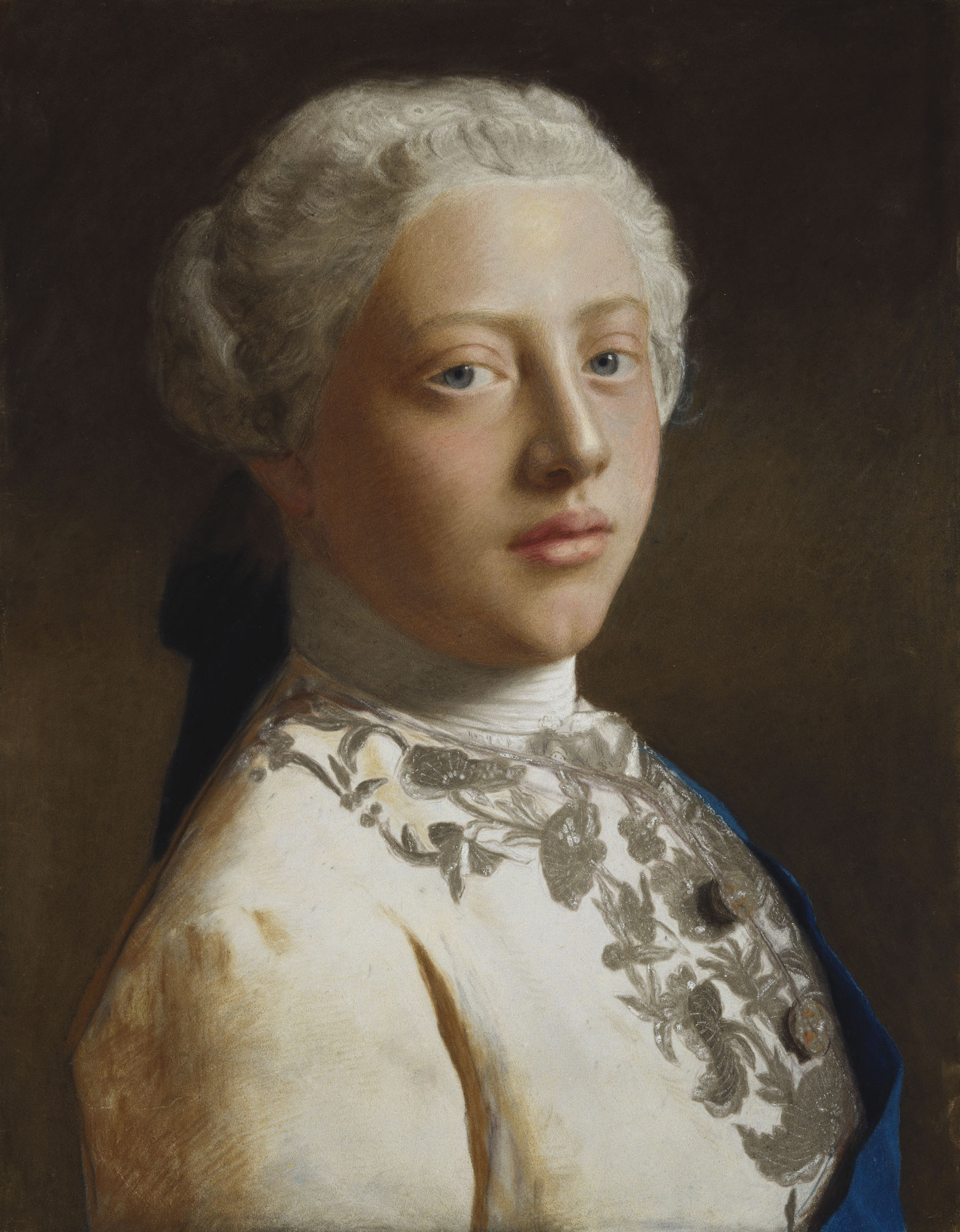
George, Prince of Wales in 1754, painted by Liotard

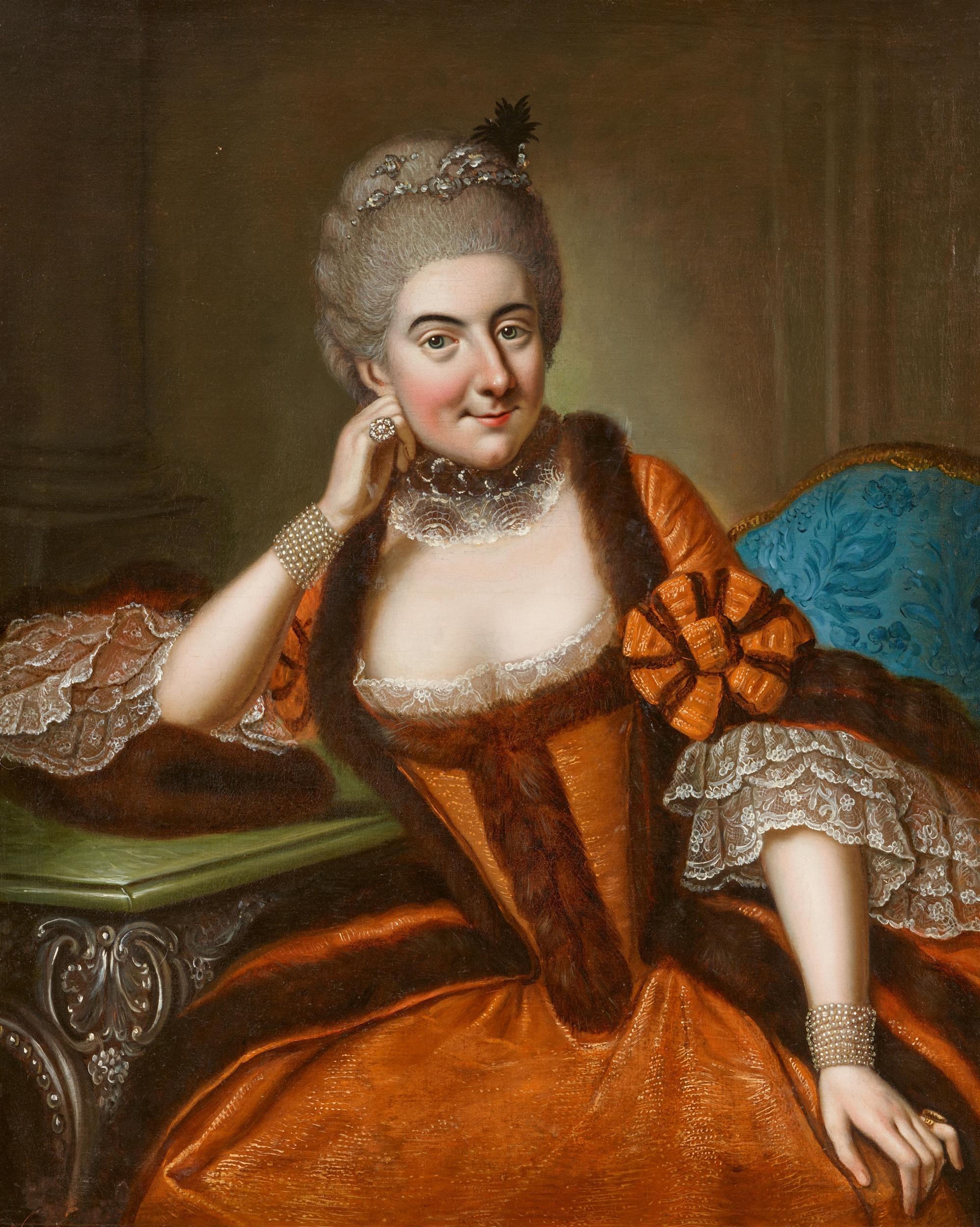
Portrait of Princess Sophie by Anna Rosina de Gasc

=== Failed betrothal ===
In 1753, George II of Great Britain hoped to marry Sophie Caroline to his grandson George, Prince of Wales (the future George III). This was an attempt to improve relations with Prussia, as Sophie Caroline was a niece of Frederick II of Prussia and George II needed Prussian troops to help offset the alliance between France and Austria that had occurred as a result of the Diplomatic Revolution. The prince's mother Augusta, Dowager Princess of Wales, thwarted George II's plans, however, which increased tensions within the British royal family. The Prince of Wales himself, influenced by his mother, was vehemently opposed to the match, declaring he would not be "bewolfenbuttelled". Augusta wanted her son to marry her niece Frederica, but this union also fell through. Soon after becoming king in 1760, George III married Charlotte of Mecklenburg-Strelitz instead the following year, in what was to become a happy marriage.

George and his mother's refusal also reflected another changing reality in British foreign policy: the relationship with the Electorate of Hanover. George II and his father George I were both descended from the House of Hanover, and thus held the electorate very dear to their hearts. As a daughter of the Duke of Brunswick-Wolfenbüttel, Sophie Caroline was ancestrally related to neighboring Hanover; good relations between the electorate and its neighbors were vital to its continuing security, particularly when another war was soon expected. The Prince of Wales and his mother however did not possess the same attachment to Hanover, thus influencing their decision to reject a match with Sophie Caroline. Though this match was not to be, Sophie Caroline's brother Charles II, Duke of Brunswick-Wolfenbüttel, married George's sister Princess Augusta in 1764, and George III's son George IV married their daughter Caroline of Brunswick, thus continuing the close ties between the two houses.

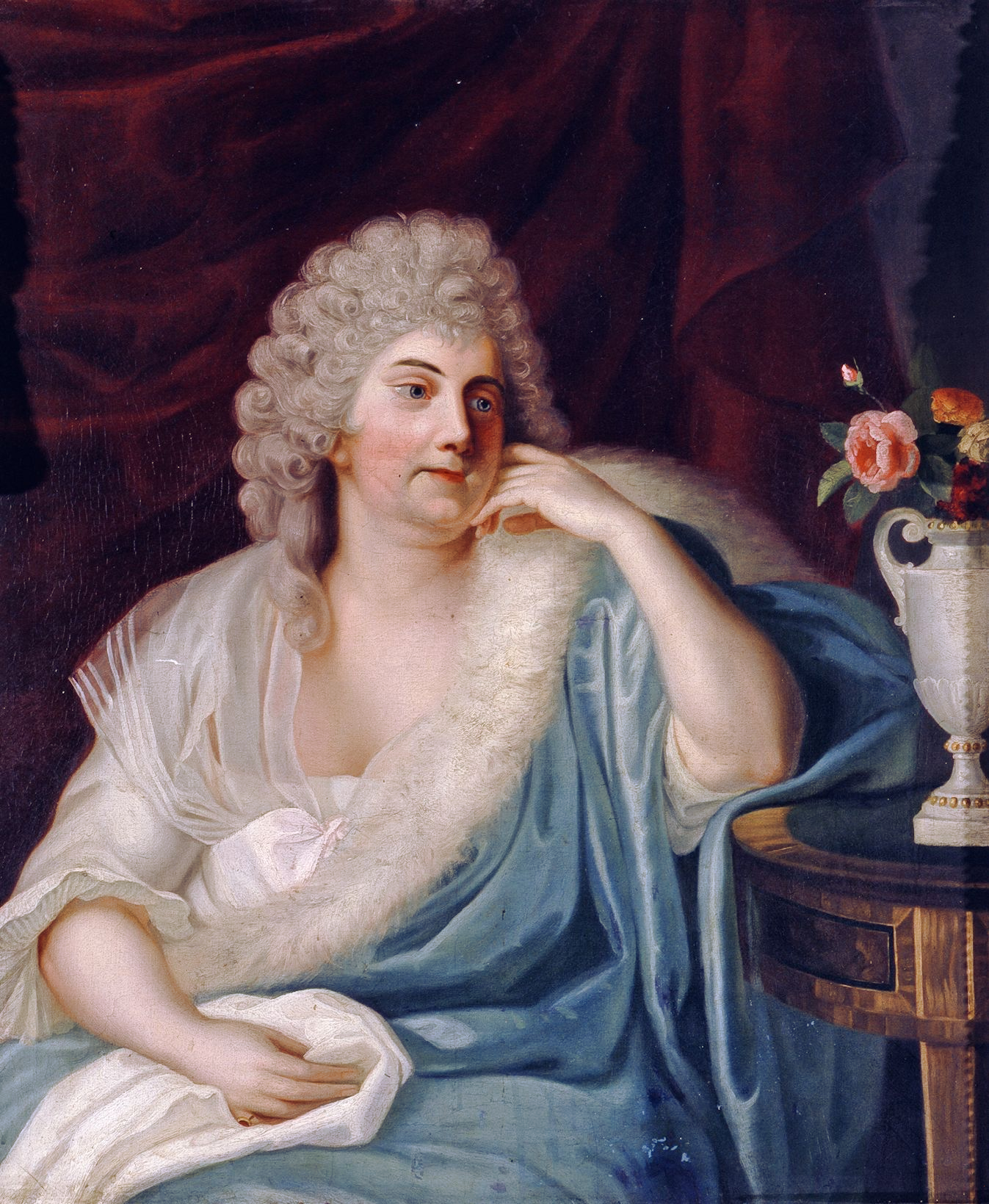
Portrait of Sophie in later life

=== Marriage ===
In Brunswick on 20 September 1759, 11 months after the death of his first wife, Sophie Caroline married Frederick, Margrave of Brandenburg-Bayreuth. He was 26 years older than she was, and their marriage was childless. While not considered a beauty, Sophie was considered witty, educated, and charming. Frederick had a daughter from his first marriage, who was five years older than Sophie Caroline. Their marriage had been contracted due to the threat of the Margraviate falling to Prussia, had Frederick no sons.

Frederick died on 26 February 1763. Without any male issue, he was succeeded on his death by his uncle, Frederick Christian.

Sophie Caroline died on 22 December 1817 at the age of 80. She never remarried.

== Ancestry ==
Ancestors of Princess Sophie Caroline of Brunswick-Wolfenbüttel

8. Ferdinand Albert I, Duke of Brunswick-Lüneburg
4. Ferdinand Albert II, Duke of Brunswick-Lüneburg
9. Princess Christine of Hesse-Eschwege
2. Charles I, Duke of Brunswick-Wolfenbüttel
10. Louis Rudolph, Duke of Brunswick-Lüneburg
5. Duchess Antoinette of Brunswick-Wolfenbüttel
11. Princess Christine Louise of Oettingen-Oettingen
1. Duchess Sophie Caroline of Brunswick-Wolfenbüttel
12. Frederick I of Prussia
6. Frederick William I of Prussia
13. Sophia Charlotte of Hanover
3. Princess Philippine Charlotte of Prussia
14. George I of Great Britain
7. Sophia Dorothea of Hanover
15. Sophia Dorothea of Celle

== Sources ==
- Black, Jeremy (2006). George III: America's Last King. Yale University Press. ISBN 0-300-11732-9.
- Black, Jeremy (2007). George II: Puppet of the Politicians?. University of Exeter Press. ISBN 978-0-85989-807-2.
- Hibbert, Christopher (1998). George III: A Personal History. Basic Books. ISBN 0-465-02724-5.

Princess Sophie Caroline of Brunswick-Wolfenbüttel House of Welf Born: 7 October 1737 Died: 23 December 1817
German nobility
Vacant Title last held by Wilhelmine of Prussia	Margravine consort of Brandenburg-Bayreuth; 20 September 1759 - 26 February 1763	Succeeded by Victoria Charlotte of Anhalt-Zeitz-Hoym
