= Asha Noppeney =

Ugandan and German athlete and advocate

- Born: Lonyangamoe; 1954 (age 71–72); Uganda
- Occupation: retired doctor's assistant
- Known for: disability advocate, Nordic walking as a disabled sportsperson
- Notable work: Tochter der Kriegernomaden (autobiographical novel)
- Spouse: Herbert Noppeney

Asha Noppeney (born 1954) is a Ugandan and German athlete and disability advocate. She is known for her participation in long-distance running events, including marathons and charity runs, despite losing her right leg in a childhood accident.

== Early and personal life ==
Noppeney was born in 1954 in Uganda. At the age of seven, she lost her right leg in a bicycle accident. She has a husband, Herbert Noppeney. As of 2024, she lives in Eckersdorf, Bayreuth, Germany.

== Career and advocacy ==
Noppeney began doing marathons at 40 years old. She has been an active participant in sporting events aimed at raising awareness and funds for people with disabilities. Since 2011, she has taken part annually in the Fichtelgebirge Nordic Walking Marathon, organized by the Gefrees Ski Club. Her stated goals include raising money for charitable causes and encouraging people with disabilities to pursue independent and active lives.

In 2010, she published her autobiography Daughter of the Warrior Nomads (Tochter der Kriegernomaden). In 2014, she became a member of Achilles International, a nonprofit that supports athletes with physical disabilities in long-distance running. Through this support, she has competed in the New York City Marathon four times.

== Awards ==
On 8 July 2021, Noppeney received the Bavarian Order of Merit from German politician Markus Söder.

On 4 December 2024, she was awarded the Cross of the Order of Merit of the Federal Republic of Germany (Bundesverdienstkreuz) in recognition of her advocacy for disabled athletes and her charitable work, particularly through marathon participation and fundraising.
