= Eckersdorf =

- Municipality
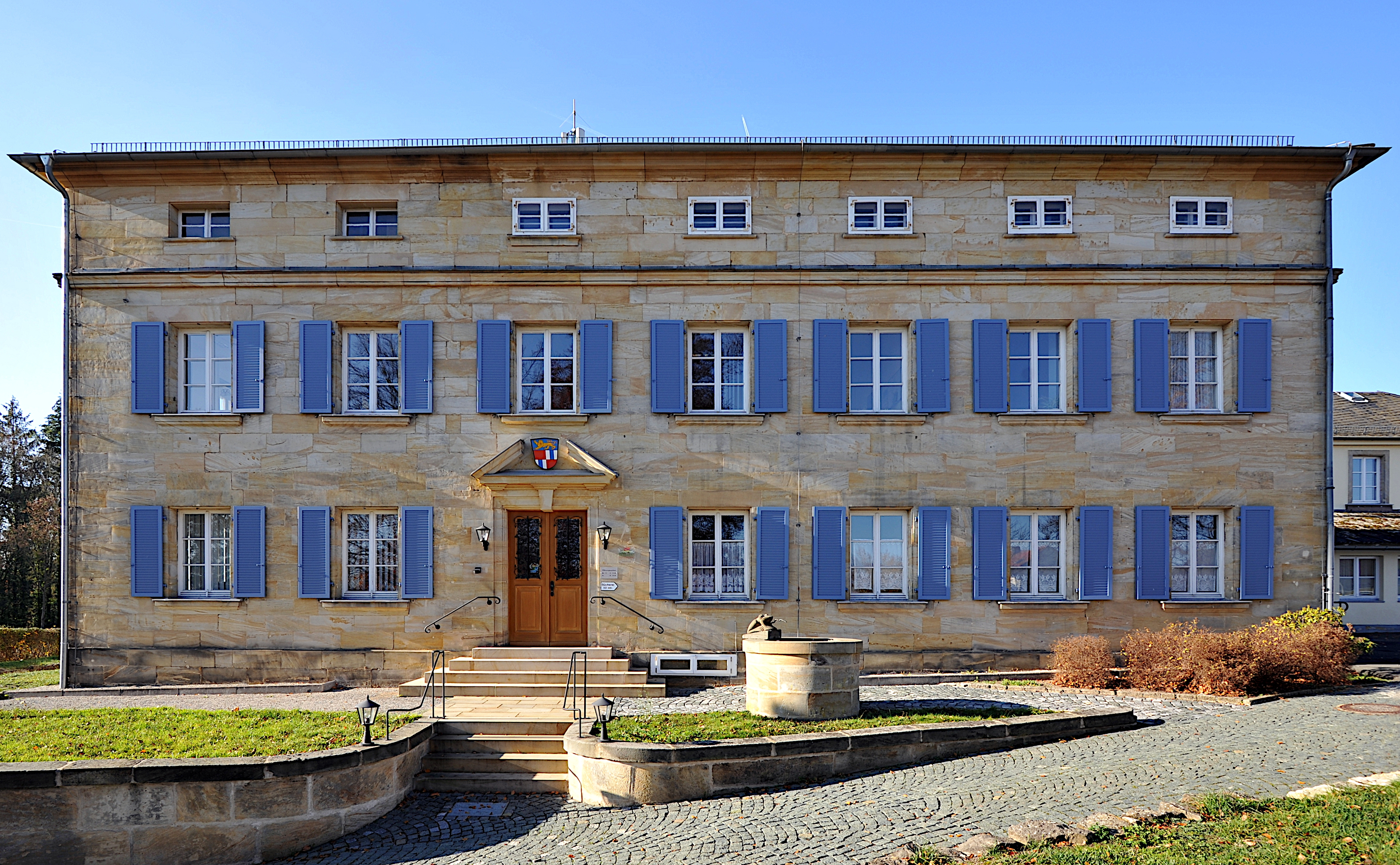
- Town hall

- Coat of arms

- Location of Eckersdorf within Bayreuth district
- Interactive map of Eckersdorf
- Location within Germany Location within Bavaria
- Coordinates: 49°55′57.97″N 11°30′4.43″E
- Country: Germany
- State: Bavaria
- Admin. region: Oberfranken
- District: Bayreuth
- Subdivisions: 22 districts

Government
  - Mayor (2020–26): Sybille Pichl (FW)

Area
  - Total: 36.19 km^{2} (13.97 sq mi)
- Elevation: 416 m (1,365 ft)

Population (2025-12-31)
  - Total: 5,047
  - Density: 139.5/km^{2} (361.2/sq mi)
- Time zone: UTC+01:00 (CET)
  - Summer (DST): UTC+02:00 (CEST)
- Postal codes: 95488
- Dialling codes: 0921
- Vehicle registration: BT
- Website: www.eckersdorf.de

Eckersdorf is a municipality in the district of Bayreuth in Bavaria in Germany.

== Geography ==
The municipality of Eckersdorf is located on the northern edge of an area called "Little Switzerland" (German: Fränkische Schweiz), close to the world-famous festival town of Bayreuth. The highest elevation in the region of Eckersdorf is the Sophienberg with an altitude of 593 m.

=== Districts ===
The present-day municipality of Eckersdorf was created in the course of municipal reform in 1978.

According to the information given by the local government, there are 22 official districts.

District	Population
Busbach	209
Donndorf	2017
Eckersdorf	2048
Eschen	124
Forst	149
Hardt	22
Heisenstein	4
Lahm	30
Lochau	22
Lohe	20
Melkendorf	17
Neustädtlein	175
Oberwaiz	350
Pleofen	32
Schanz	27
Simmelbuch	65
Stein	0
Tröbersdorf	71
Vorlahm	15
Waldhütte	0
Windhof	8
Wolfsgraben	1

=== Neighboring communities ===
The neighboring communities of Eckersdorf are (starting north in clockwise order): Thurnau, Bayreuth, Mistelbach, and Mistelgau.

== History ==
Eckersdorf was first mentioned in 1149 in the so-called Giechburgvertrag. The Counts of Andechs-Meranien (Grafen von Andechs-Meranien) owned the current area of Eckersdorf until they died off in 1248. The lords of Berg Plassenberg (Herren von Plassenberg) acquired first property in the Eckersdorf area in 1420. A hundred years later, the lords were in full possession of Eckersdorf. After the last representative of the family died in 1552, Eckersdorf came to the Lords of Lüchau, and then it fell to the Markgrafschaft Bayreuth in 1757. As part of the Prussian Principality of Bayreuth, Eckersdorf became a French possession through the Treaties of Tilsit, until 1810, when it became part of Bavaria. In the course of administrative reform in Bavaria in 1818, today's municipality Eckersdorf was created.

== Politics ==
At the latest elections for mayor in 2020, Sybille Pichl (Freie Wählergemeinschaft Eckersdorf-Donndorf und Umgebung) was re-elected. She has been in office since 2010.

== Sights ==
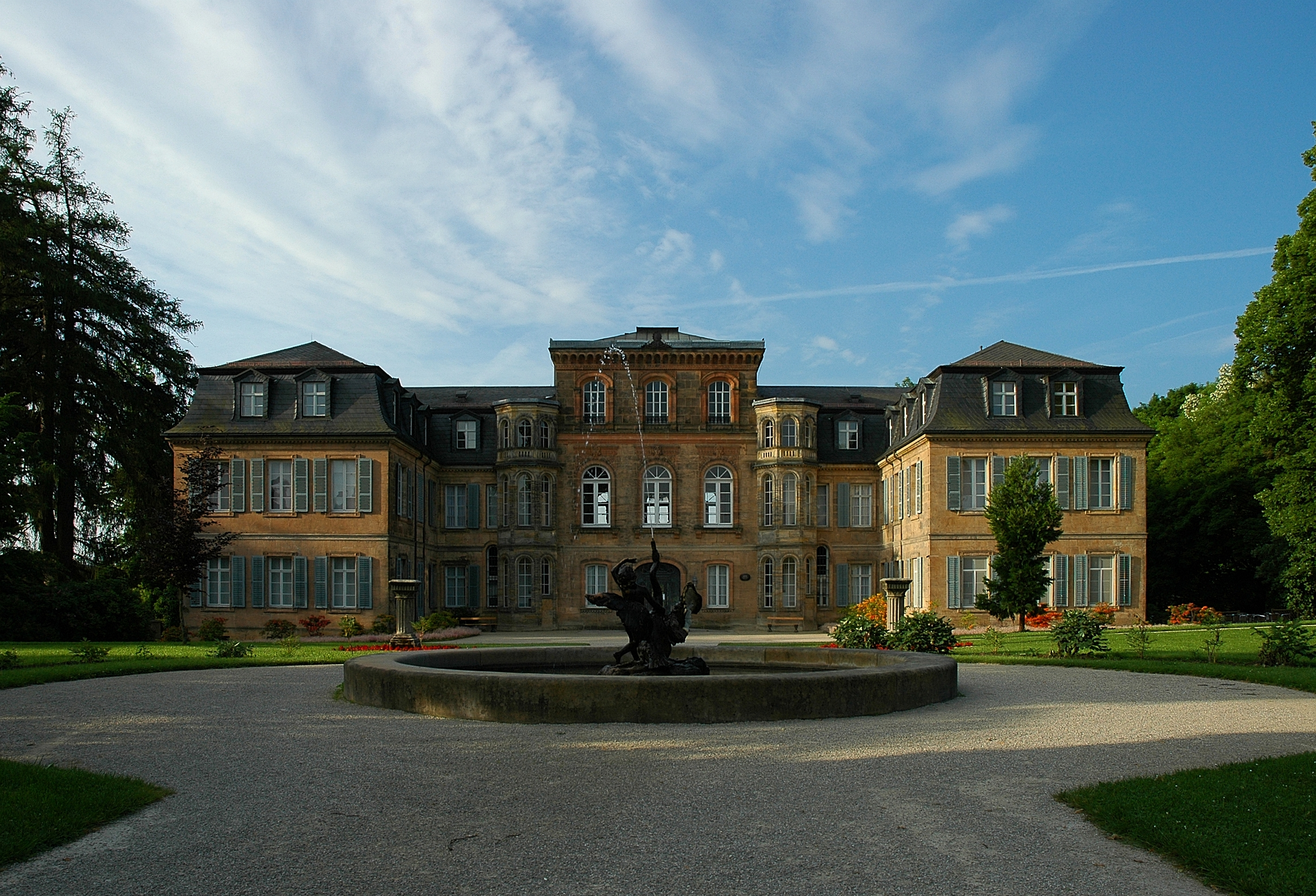
Schloss Fantaisie (north view)

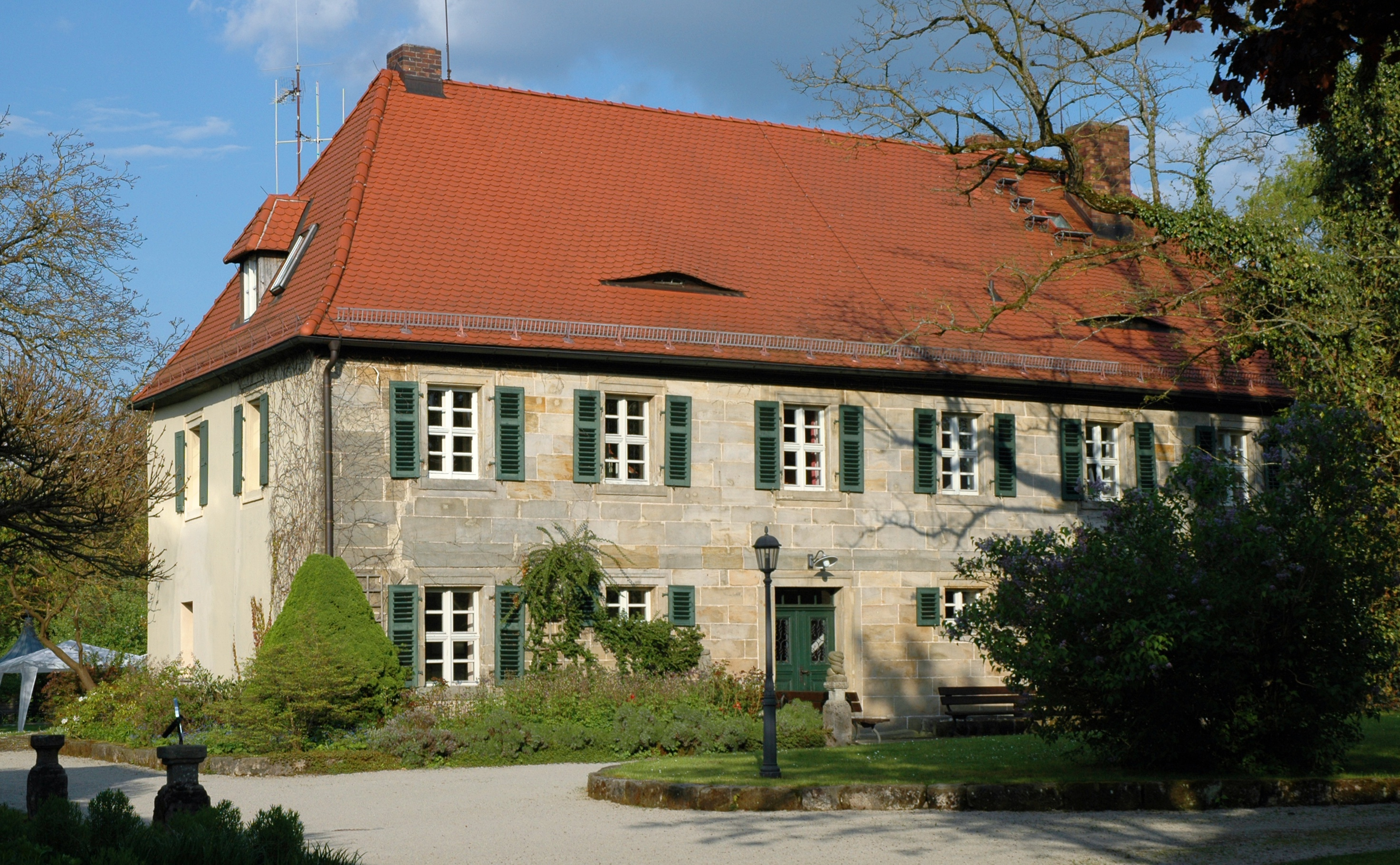
Oberwaiz: forester's house, former Jagdschloss of the Plassenbergers, now used by the Evangelisch Reformed church, built in 1776

Johann Jacob Spindler built Schloss Fantaisie for Margravine Elisabeth Fredericka Sophie of Brandenburg-Bayreuth from 1758 to 1765. Today, there is a garden museum in this rococo palace. The listed town hall in the Donndorf district was built around 1830.

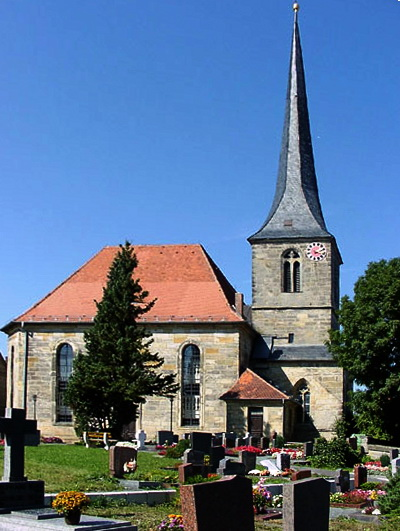
St. Ägidius church was built in 1791 and the forester's house Oberwaiz in 1776.

== Notable people ==
- Asha Noppeney, athlete (born 1954)
