= Wilhelmine Dorothee von der Marwitz =

Wilhelmine Dorothee von der Marwitz (April 1718 – 16 January 1787) was the mistress of Frederick, Margrave of Brandenburg-Bayreuth from the late 1730s until 1744. In the 1780s, she hosted an influential salon in Vienna.

== Life ==
She was the eldest of the three daughters of the Prussian nobleman Heinrich Karl von der Marwitz (1680–1744), infantry general and governor of Breslau (today Wrocław, Poland) and Albertine Eleonore von Wittenhorst (1693–1721). After her mother's death, she and her sisters were raised by their maternal aunt, Flora von Sonsfeld, the Hofmeisterin of Princess Wilhelmine of Prussia. The Princess married the Margrave of Brandenburg-Bayreuth in 1731, and her aunt wanted to bring fourteen-year-old Wilhelmine Dorothee to Bayreuth to finish her education. However, the three girls were heiresses to their father's fortune, and King Frederick William I had forbidden such women to leave the country, confiscating their wealth if they did so. In 1732, to help her Hofmeisterin, the Princess gained permission from her father to employ Wilhelmine Dorothee as her reader.

At some point in the 1730s, Wilhelmine's husband, Frederick, Margrave of Brandenburg-Bayreuth, made her his official favourite. It is considered likely that he abused his position to force Wilhelmine Dorothee into the relationship.

In 1744, her employer, the Margravine, arranged for her to marry an Austrian count, Otto Ludwig Conrad von Burghauß (1713–1795). She left Bayreuth to settle in Austria, ending her position as royal favourite. She lived in Budapest and Trieste with her spouse. In 1780, she moved to Vienna, where she hosted an influential literary salon frequented by Georg Forster, Henry Swinburne, Graf Karl von Zinzendorf and Wenzel Anton von Kaunitz. She supported Josephinist reforms and acted as benefactor of Benjamin Thompson and Johann Hunczowski.
