= Princess Elisabeth Friederike Sophie of Brandenburg-Bayreuth =

Elisabeth Friederike Sophie of Brandenburg-Bayreuth
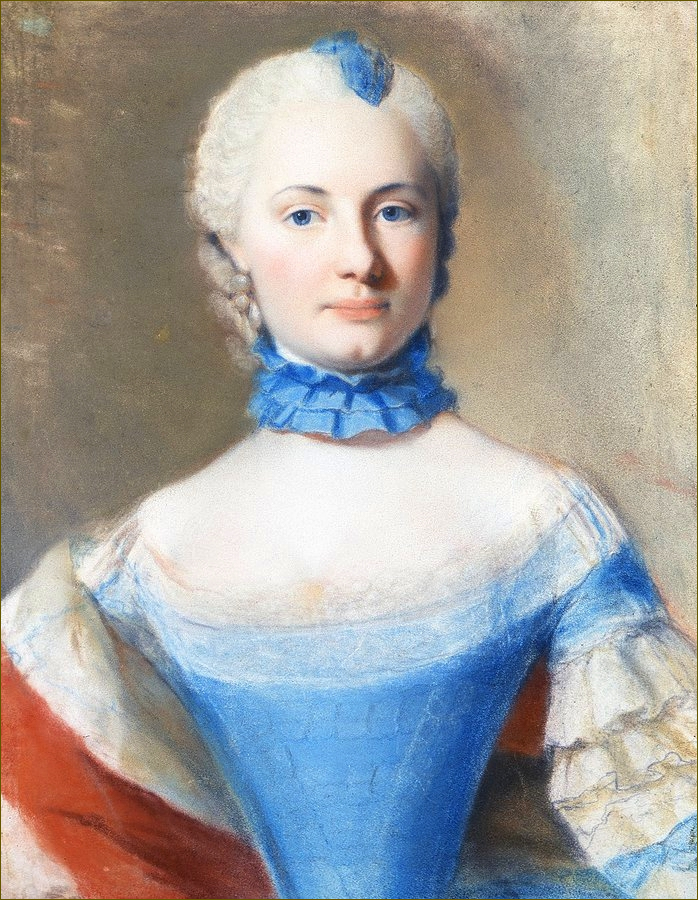

Duchess consort of Württemberg
- Tenure: 26 September 1748 – 6 April 1780
- Born: 30 August 1732
- Died: 6 April 1780 (aged 47)
- Spouse: Charles Eugene, Duke of Württemberg
- Issue: Friederike Wilhelmine Augusta Luisa Charlotte
- Father: Frederick, Margrave of Brandenburg-Bayreuth
- Mother: Wilhelmine of Prussia

Princess Elisabeth Friederike Sophie of Brandenburg-Bayreuth (30 August 1732 – 6 April 1780), was a German princess of the House of Hohenzollern and the Duchess of Württemberg by marriage.

== Biography ==
=== Early life ===
She was born in Bayreuth, the daughter of Frederick, Margrave of Brandenburg-Bayreuth by his first wife, Princess Wilhelmine of Prussia, the favourite sister of King Frederick the Great. Both the Margrave and the Margravine hoped for the eventual birth of a son and heir; however, this never happened. Thus, Elisabeth Fredericka Sophie grew up as an only child at the court of her father in Bayreuth.

At the time of her birth, her parents' marriage was still intact. However, during the following years the couple became estranged as Margrave Frederick turned his affections to other women. His most prominent mistress was Wilhelmine von Marwitz, one of his wife's ladies-in-waiting.

Elisabeth Fredericka Sophie was considered one of the most beautiful princesses of her time. The girl was praised by Italian serial lover and writer Casanova himself as "the most beautiful princess in Germany". As an only child, she had a rigorous education and was prepared for a high and noble marriage.

=== Marriage ===
In January 1744 the ruling Duke Charles Eugene of Württemberg visited Bayreuth and fell in love with Elisabeth. Her uncle, King Frederick II the Great of Prussia, promoted Charles Eugene as a good match for her, because he had known him during the two years he was educated at the Prussian court. Although the Margrave of Brandenburg-Ansbach and the King of Denmark were also suitors of the princess, Elisabeth's family chose Charles Eugene.

On 26 September 1748 the marriage of Elisabeth Fredericka Sophie and Charles Eugene took place in Bayreuth. The wedding was the most festive celebration in the history of the margraviate. Within the framework of the brilliant festivities the margrave's opera house was opened and commemorative coins with half-length portraits of the young couple were stamped with the saying "If the lit flames are extinguished tenfold, they will only burn brighter".

The marriage was initially happy, but began to sour after a few years. Elisabeth was resentful over her total lack of influence in state affairs. The couple's disagreements led to—and then were compounded by—Charles Eugene's decision to no longer hide his infidelities. Unencumbered by a pretense of fidelity, the duke began to spend much of his time with his mistresses.

Despite their increasing disputes, Elisabeth became pregnant. On 19 February 1750 Elisabeth gave birth to their only child, a daughter, Princess Fredericka Wilhelmine Augusta Luisa Charlotte of Württemberg, who died on 12 March 1751 shortly after her first birthday. The absence of a male heir increased the conflicts between the young couple.

The need for an heir calmed their relations for a while, but after a journey to Italy in 1753 the Duke began taking mistresses again and new disputes arose. The ducal couple became permanently estranged in 1756, when Charles Eugene despotically arrested and illegally imprisoned Elisabeth's friend, chamber singer Marianne Pirker.

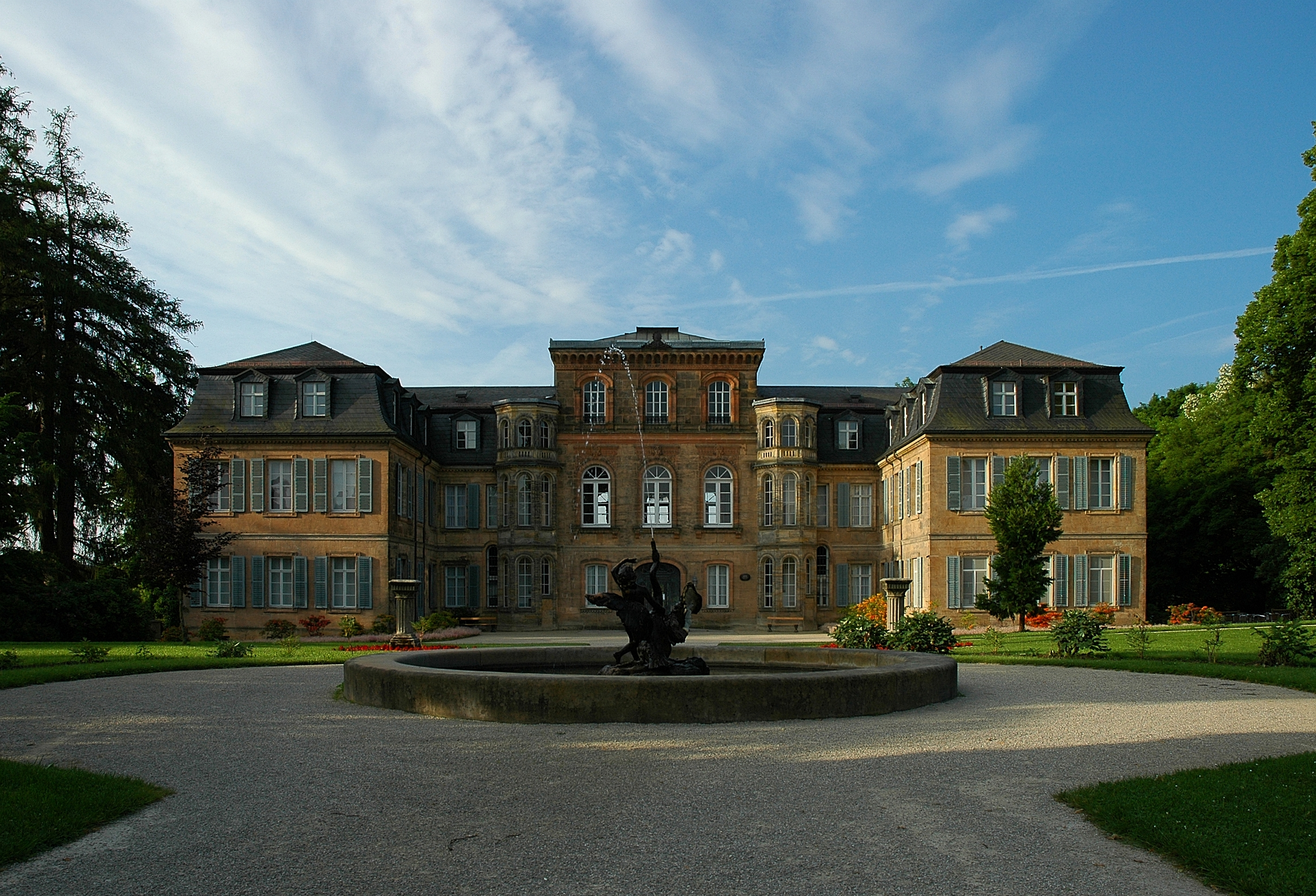
Castle Fantaisie (north view).

During the Seven Years' War Charles Eugene joined of the alliance of Austria and France against Prussia and England and in doing so destroyed his friendly connections with the Prussian King. When in the autumn of 1756 Elisabeth visited her mother in Bayreuth, she refused to return to her husband in Württemberg. The dispute over the state of her marriage to Charles Eugene was now out in the open. It took until 1759 for Elisabeth's father and Charles Eugene to make a final agreement. The marriage would not be dissolved, and Elisabeth would remain as Duchess of Württemberg. Charles Eugene and the estates of Württemberg were bound to pay 54,000 guilders of maintenance to her annually. However, Charles Eugene kept the right to determine her household. In this way he remained informed about her activities and could also affect her circumstances.

After the death of her father in 1763, Elisabeth inherited the castle (German: Schloss) near Donndorf (now municipality Eckersdorf), which was still under construction. It had been begun by the Margrave Frederick, but was not completed until 1765. She remodeled and furnished the castle to suit her taste and personality, and gave it the name of Schloss Fantaisie which it still bears today.

She died in the Old Castle (Alten Schloss) in Bayreuth, aged 47. At her request, she was buried in the Castle Chapel of Bayreuth (Schlosskirche Bayreuth) beside her parents.

== Issue ==
- Friederike Wilhelmine Augusta Luisa Charlotte (19 February 1750 – 12 March 1751), princess of Württemberg, died shortly after her first birthday.

== Ancestry ==
Ancestors of Princess Elisabeth Friederike Sophie of Brandenburg-Bayreuth

8. Christian Henry, Margrave of Brandenburg-Kulmbach
4. George Frederick Charles, Margrave of Brandenburg-Bayreuth
9. Countess Sophie Christiane of Wolfstein
2. Frederick, Margrave of Brandenburg-Bayreuth
10. Frederick Louis, Duke of Schleswig-Holstein-Sonderburg-Beck
5. Princess Dorothea of Schleswig-Holstein-Sonderburg-Beck
11. Princess Luise Charlotte of Schleswig-Holstein-Sonderburg-Augustenburg
1. Princess Elisabeth Friederike Sophie of Brandenburg-Bayreuth
12. Frederick I of Prussia
6. Frederick William I of Prussia
13. Princess Sophia Charlotte of Hanover
3. Princess Wilhelmine of Prussia
14. George I of Great Britain
7. Princess Sophia Dorothea of Hanover
15. Princess Sophia Dorothea of Celle

Princess Elisabeth Friederike Sophie of Brandenburg-Bayreuth House of Hohenzollern Born: 30 August 1732 Died: 6 April 1780
Regnal titles
Preceded by Maria Augusta of Thurn and Taxis	Duchess consort of Württemberg; 1748–1780	Succeeded by Franziska von Hohenheim
