= Wilhelmine, Margravine of Brandenburg-Bayreuth =

Wilhelmine of Prussia
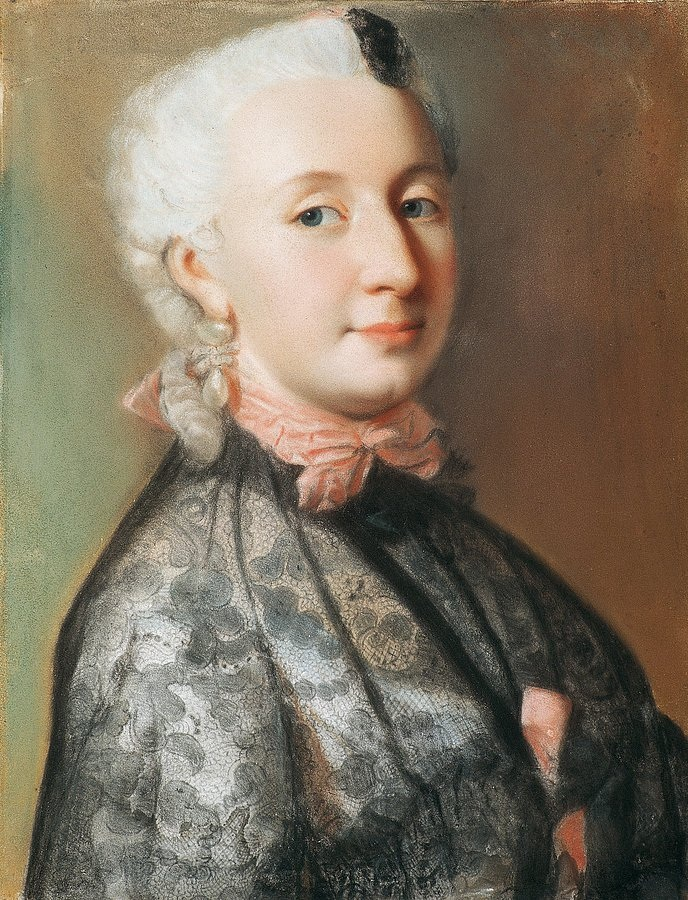
- Portrait by Jean-Étienne Liotard, c. 1745

Margravine consort of Brandenburg-Bayreuth
- Tenure: 17 May 1735 – 14 October 1758
- Born: 3 July 1709; Berlin, Kingdom of Prussia
- Died: 14 October 1758 (aged 49); Bayreuth, Principality of Bayreuth
- Spouse: Frederick, Margrave of Brandenburg-Bayreuth (m. 1731)
- Issue: Fredericka, Duchess of Württemberg
Names
- Friederike Sophie Wilhelmine
- House: Hohenzollern
- Father: Frederick William I of Prussia
- Mother: Sophia Dorothea of Hanover

Princess Wilhelmine of Prussia (Friederike Sophie Wilhelmine; 3 July 1709 – 14 October 1758) was a Prussian princess and composer. She was the eldest daughter of Frederick William I of Prussia and Sophia Dorothea of Hanover, and a granddaughter of George I of Great Britain. She was the older sister of Frederick the Great. In 1731, she married Frederick, Margrave of Brandenburg-Bayreuth. The baroque buildings and parks built during her tenure shape much of the present appearance of the town of Bayreuth, Germany.

== Early life ==
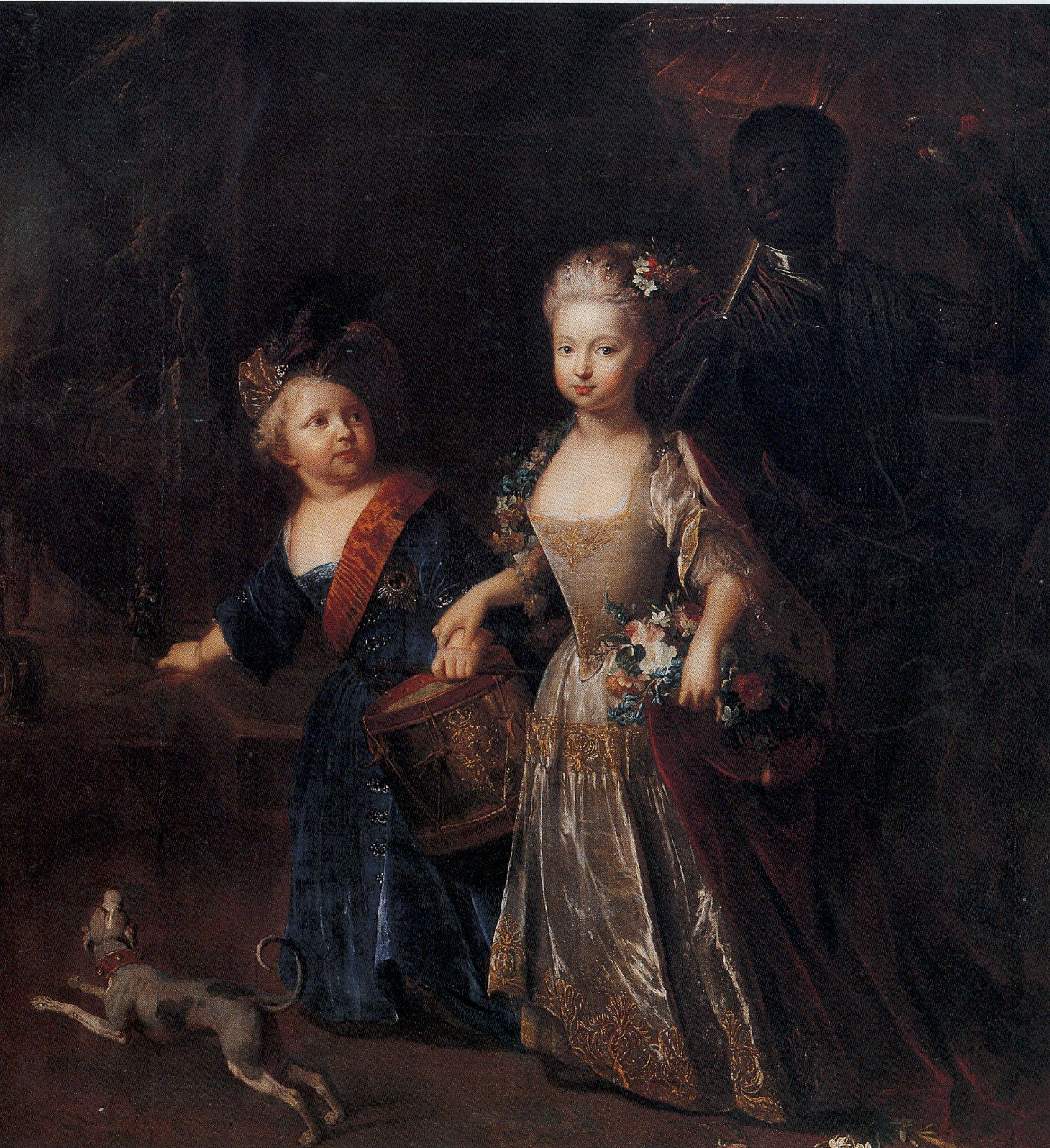
Wilhelmine with her brother Frederick, as children

Born in Berlin, Wilhelmine shared the unhappy childhood of her brother, Frederick the Great, whose friend and confidante she remained all her life, with the exception of one short interval. She was fiercely beaten and abused by her governess during her childhood. Wilhelmine later wrote: "Not a day passed that she [the governess] did not prove upon me the fearful power of her fists." The mistreatment continued until the prince's governess finally said to their mother, who had been oblivious to the abuse, that she would not be surprised if Wilhelmine was eventually beaten until she was crippled. After this, the governess was promptly replaced.

Being the eldest daughter in her family, she was early the target of discussions about political marriages. Her mother, Queen Sophia Dorothea, wished her to marry her nephew Frederick, Prince of Wales, but on the British side there was no inclination to make an offer of marriage except in exchange for substantial concessions that Wilhelmine's father would not accept. The fruitless intrigues carried on by Sophia Dorothea to bring about this match played a large part in Wilhelmine's early life. Her father, on the other hand, preferred a match with the House of Habsburg.

== Marriage ==
After much talk of other matches came to nothing, Wilhelmine was eventually married in 1731 to her Hohenzollern kinsman, Frederick, Margrave of Brandenburg-Bayreuth. Frederick had been engaged to Wilhelmine's younger sister, Sophie, but at the last moment King Frederick William I decided to replace her with Wilhelmine. The groom was not consulted in this decision.

This marriage was only accepted by Wilhelmine under threats from her father and with a view to lightening her brother's disgrace. It was initially a happy marriage, but was eventually clouded first by limited financial resources and then by a love affair of the future Margrave with Dorothea von Marwitz, whose rise as an official mistress at the court of Bayreuth was bitterly resented by her brother Frederick the Great and caused an estrangement of some three years between him and Wilhelmine.

Wilhelmine's only child was Elisabeth Fredericka Sophie of Brandenburg-Bayreuth, born on August 30, 1732. Described by Casanova as the most beautiful princess in Germany, she was married to Karl Eugen, Duke of Württemberg, in 1748. She died on 6 April 1780 without surviving children.

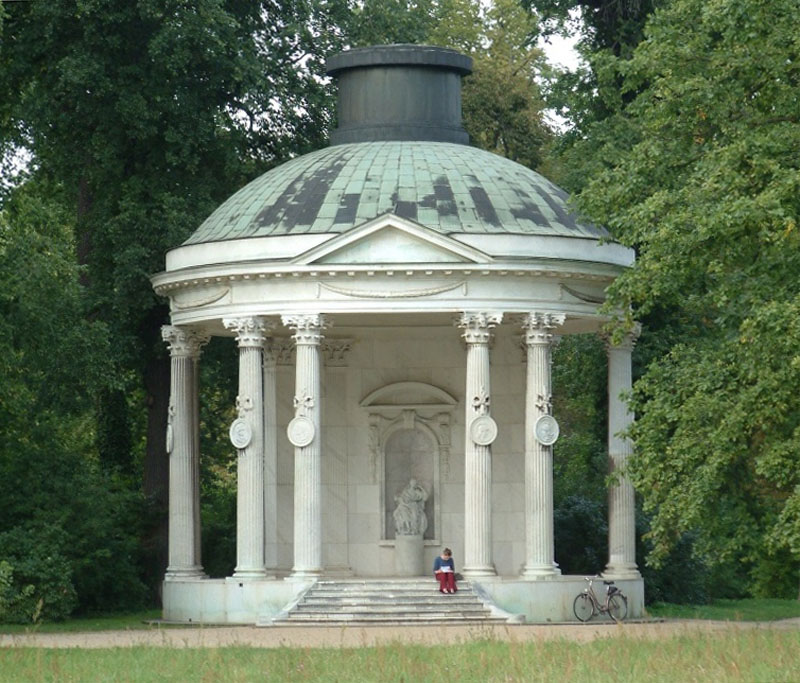
The Temple of Friendship, built in her memory

When Wilhelmine's spouse came into his inheritance in 1735, the pair set about making Bayreuth a miniature Versailles. Their building projects included the rebuilding of their summer residence (now part of the Hermitage Museum (Bayreuth)); the rebuilding of the great Bayreuth opera house; the building of a second, new opera house; the building of a theater; and the reconstruction of the Bayreuth palace. The so-called Bayreuth Rococo style of architecture is renowned even today. The pair also founded the University of Erlangen. All of these ambitious undertakings pushed the court to the verge of bankruptcy.

The margravine made Bayreuth one of the chief intellectual centers of the Holy Roman Empire, surrounding herself with a court of wits and artists that accrued added prestige from the occasional visits of Voltaire and Frederick the Great.

Wilhelmine's brother Frederick granted her an allowance in exchange for troops, following the same procedure with her sisters. With the outbreak of the Seven Years' War, Wilhelmine's interests shifted from dilettantism to diplomacy. Austrian diplomats were trying to influence the court of Bayreuth to take their side against Prussia. In September 1745, during the Silesian war, Wilhelmine met with Maria Theresa of Austria. This almost destroyed her intimate relationship with her brother. In 1750 Wilhelmine visited the Prussian court for several weeks and met famous contemporaries such as Voltaire, Maupertuis and La Mettrie. In June 1754, the siblings met for the last time, after which Frederick swore her his eternal loyalty. She acted as eyes and ears for her brother in southern Germany until her death at Bayreuth on 14 October 1758, the day of Frederick's defeat by the Austrian forces of Leopold Josef Graf Daun at the Battle of Hochkirch. Although Frederick had lost many friends and family to death throughout his life, Wilhelmine's hit him the hardest. He suffered from severe illness for a week following news of Wilhelmine's death and fell into a depression from which he never fully recovered.

On the tenth anniversary of her death, her devastated brother had the Temple of Friendship built at Sanssouci in her memory.

== Works ==
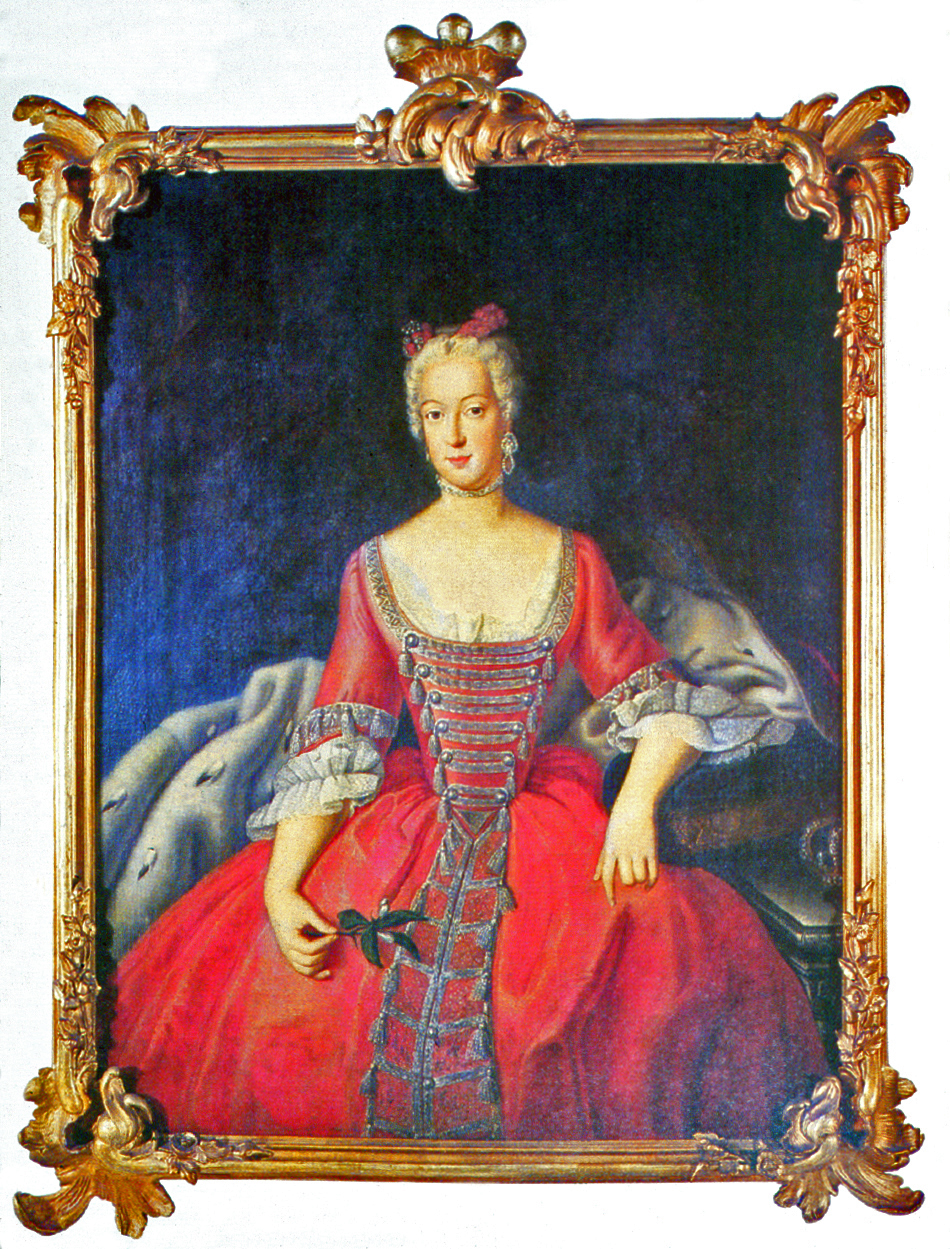
The Margravine of Bayreuth.

=== Memoirs ===
The margravine's memoirs, Memoires de ma vie, written or revised in French between 1748 and her death, are preserved in the Royal Library of Berlin. They were first printed in two forms in 1810: a German translation down to the year 1733 from the firm of Cotta of Tübingen; and a version in French published by Vieweg of Brunswick, and coming down to 1742. There were several subsequent editions: an English translation from the French of her memoirs was published in a two volume edition in 1828 by Hunt and Clarke, York St., Covent Garden; a German one published at Leipzig in 1908. An English translation was published in Berlin in 1904. Scribner and Welford published Princess Helena of the United Kingdom's German-to-English translation of Wilhelmine's memoirs in 1887. the discussion on the authenticity of these entertaining, though not very trustworthy, memoirs, see G. H. Pertz, Uber die Merkwürdigkeiten der Markgrafin (1851). See also Arvede Barine, Princesses et grandes dames (Paris, 1890); E. E. Cuttell, Wilhelmine, Margravine of Baireuth (London, 2 vols., 1905); ' and R. Fester, Die Bayreuther Schwester Friedrichs des Grossen (Berlin, 1902). Writer William Thackeray recommended the memoirs to "those who are curious about European Court history of the last age".

=== Musical Compositions ===
In addition to her other accomplishments, Wilhelmine was also a gifted composer, performer and supporter of music. She was a lutenist, a student of Sylvius Leopold Weiss, and the employer of Bernhard Joachim Hagen.

Concerto in g minor for harpsichord, strings and continuo:

1. Allegro, G minor.
2. Cantabile, B flat major.
3. Gavottes I & II, G minor.

The obbligato flute part could have been played either by her brother or her husband, as both were flautists (and pupils of Quantz). Each movement takes wing from solid and vigorous openings. There is a stubborn insistence about the first tutti's repeated octave jumps, offset by the buoyancy of its striding sequences. She has a Bach-like flair for phrase extensions, which is also evident in the final gavotte where the solo shadows the orchestra and emerges to take the lead. Some of the ideas in the 34 bar slow movement are more son-of-Bach in style; and in the D minor second gavotte, which serves as a central "trio" to the first, there is a delicate episode of rather French, languishing descents.

The full score of this concerto is published by Furore Editions.

Argenore: opera c. 1740. Seven soloists (3 sop., 1 mezzo-sop., 2 alto, 1 baritone or mezzo-sop.), and orchestra (1 flute, 2 oboes, 2 trumpets, strings, continuo). Performed in 1740 for her husband's birthday.

A copy of the complete manuscript, as well as modern transcriptions of the several movements, can be found on imslp.

Cavatinen: short songs; voice, strings, harpsichord. An arrangement of this work is published by Furore Editions.

Flute Sonata: flute & keyboard, c. 1730. A modern edition of this work is published by Furore Editions.

== In fiction ==
- Princess Wilhelmine is the main character of the 1909 historical novel A Gentle Knight of Old Brandenburg by Charles Major.

== Ancestry ==
Ancestors of Wilhelmine, Margravine of Brandenburg-Bayreuth

8. Frederick William, Elector of Brandenburg
4. Frederick I of Prussia
9. Louise Henriette of Orange-Nassau
2. Frederick William I of Prussia
10. Ernest Augustus, Elector of Hanover (=12)
5. Sophia Charlotte of Hanover
11. Sophia of the Palatinate (=13)
1. Princess Wilhelmine of Prussia
12. Ernest Augustus, Elector of Hanover (=10)
6. George I of Great Britain
13. Sophia of the Palatinate (=11)
3. Sophia Dorothea of Hanover
14. George William, Duke of Brunswick-Lüneburg
7. Sophia Dorothea of Celle
15. Éléonore Desmier d'Olbreuse

== Notes ==
Wilhelmine, Margravine of Brandenburg-Bayreuth House of Hohenzollern Born: 3 July 1709 Died: 14 October 1758
German nobility
Vacant Title last held by Sophie of Saxe-Weissenfels	Margravine consort of Brandenburg-Bayreuth; 17 May 1735 – 14 October 1758	Vacant Title next held by Sophie Caroline Marie of Brunswick-Wolfenbüttel
