= Hermitage Museum (Bayreuth) =

Coordinates: 49.947°N 11.623°E

The Hermitage or Eremitage (in German) is a palace complex and garden in Bayreuth, Germany.

The museum was created from a historical park with fountains, constructed in 1715. Notable buildings include the Old Palace, a New Castle with sun temple, and other smaller buildings.

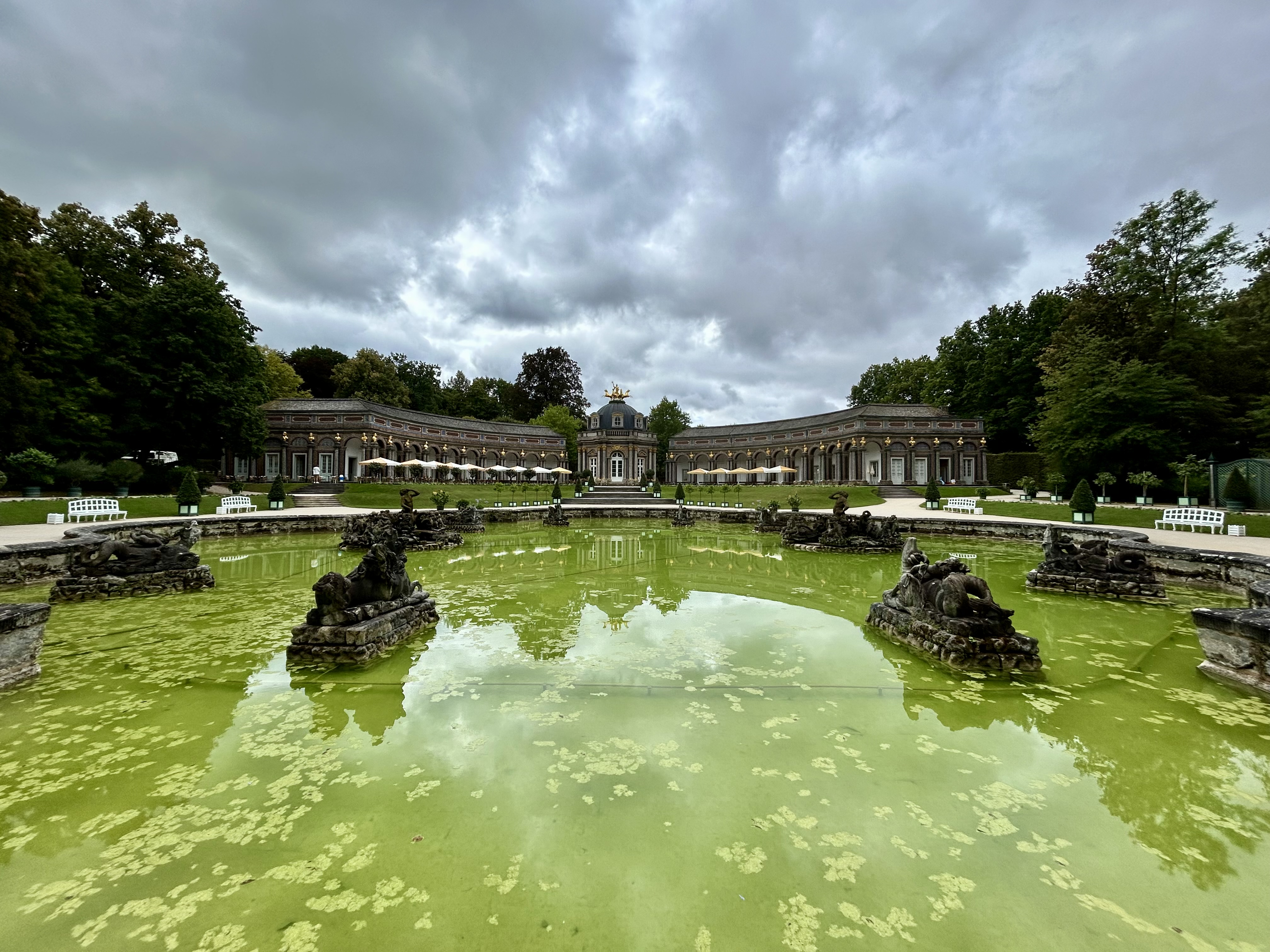
Das Neues Schloss (the New Castle)

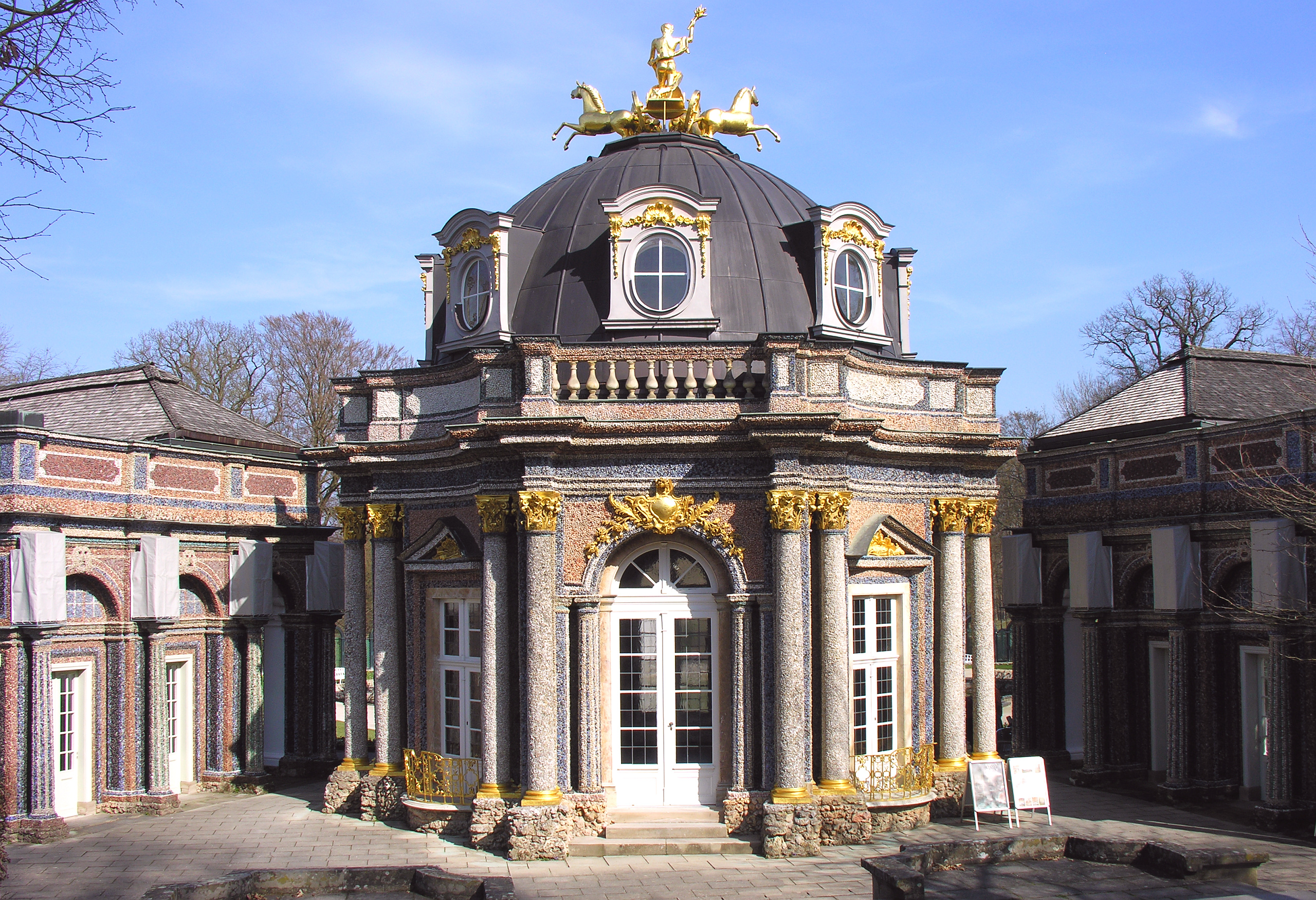
The New Castle built in 1753 (called sun temple) with entrance, view from the south

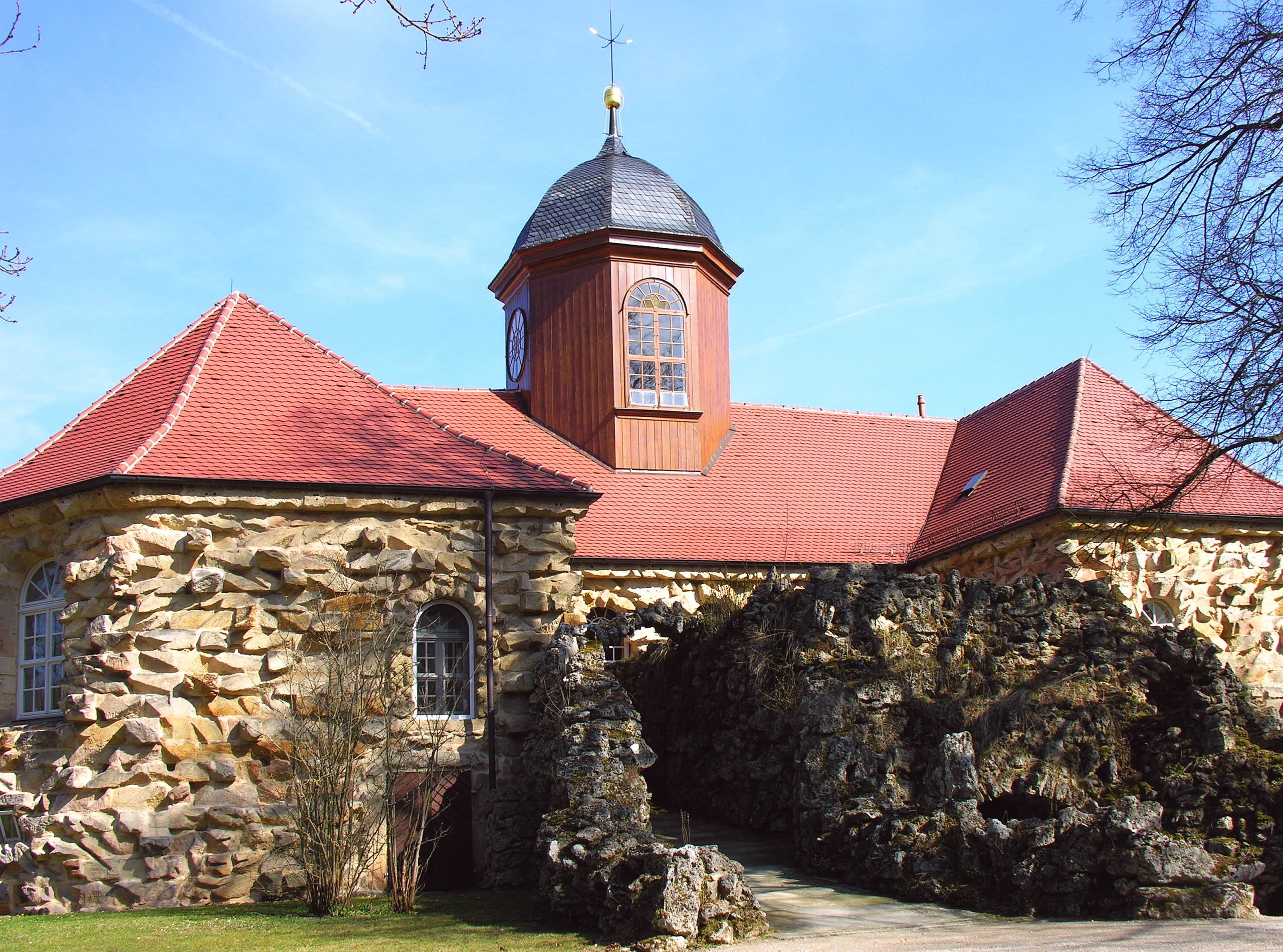
The Old Palace (1719-22), exterior, from the entrance side

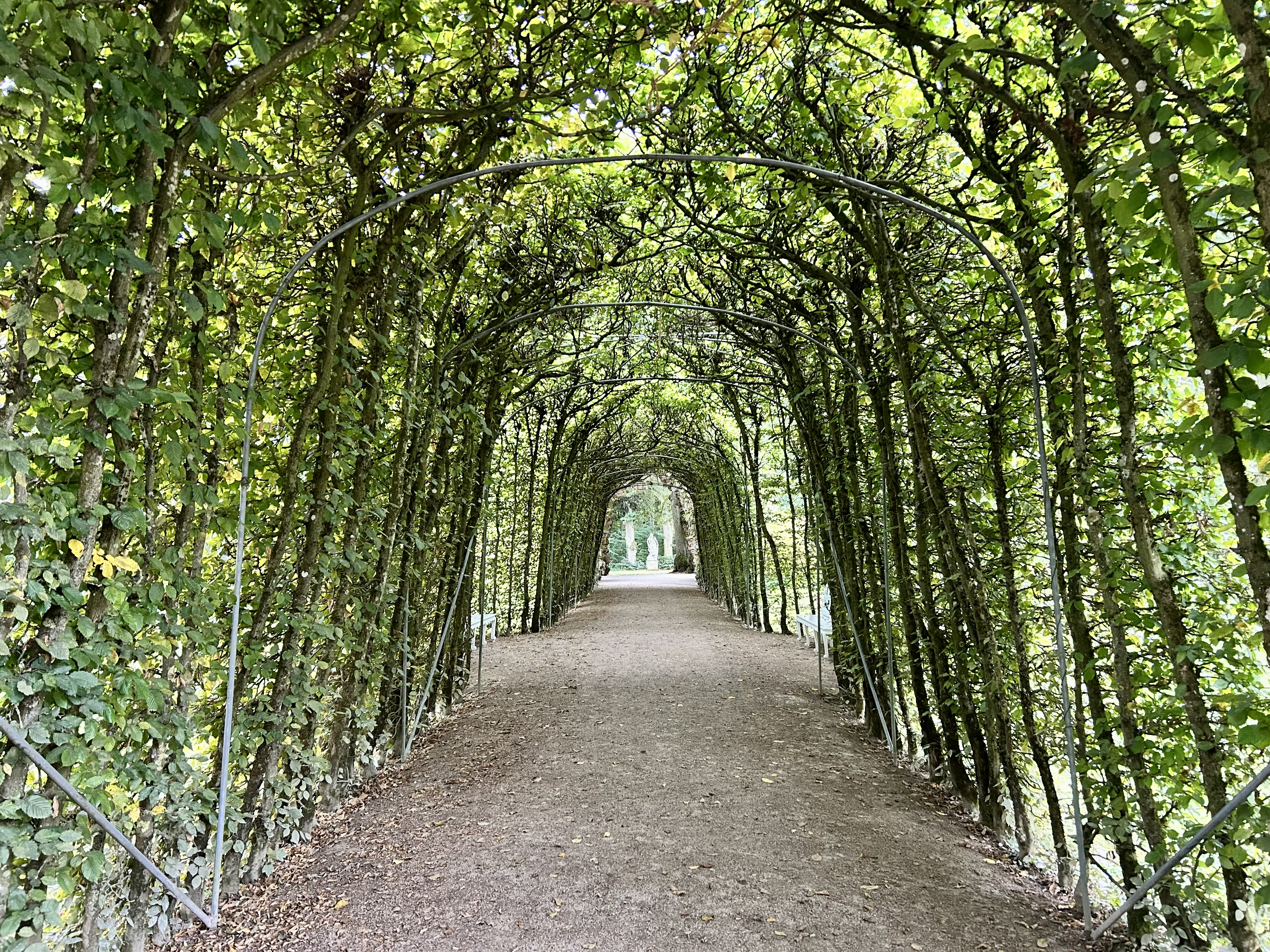
Hofgarten (the Caste Garden)

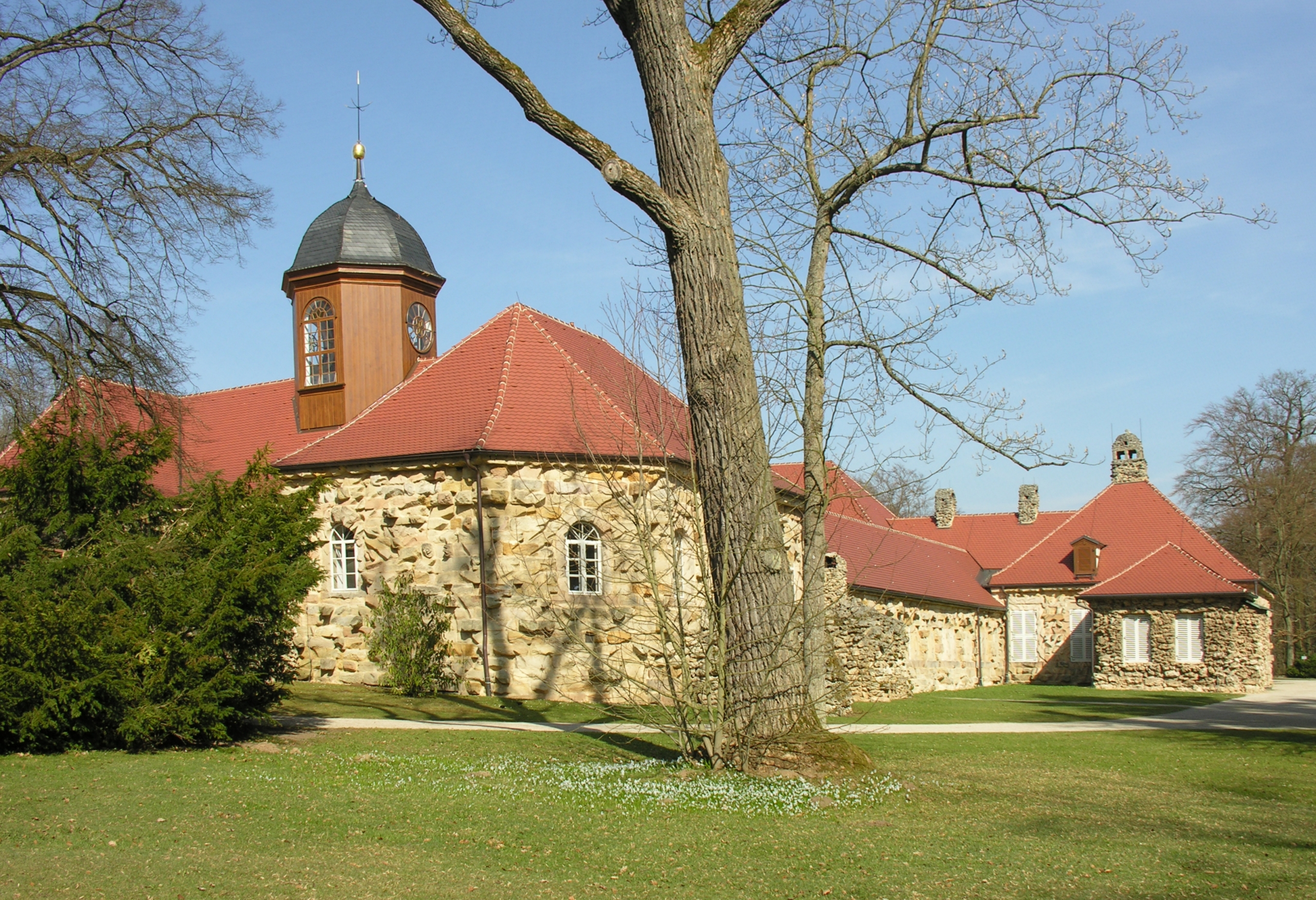
The Old Palace in perspective of southeast

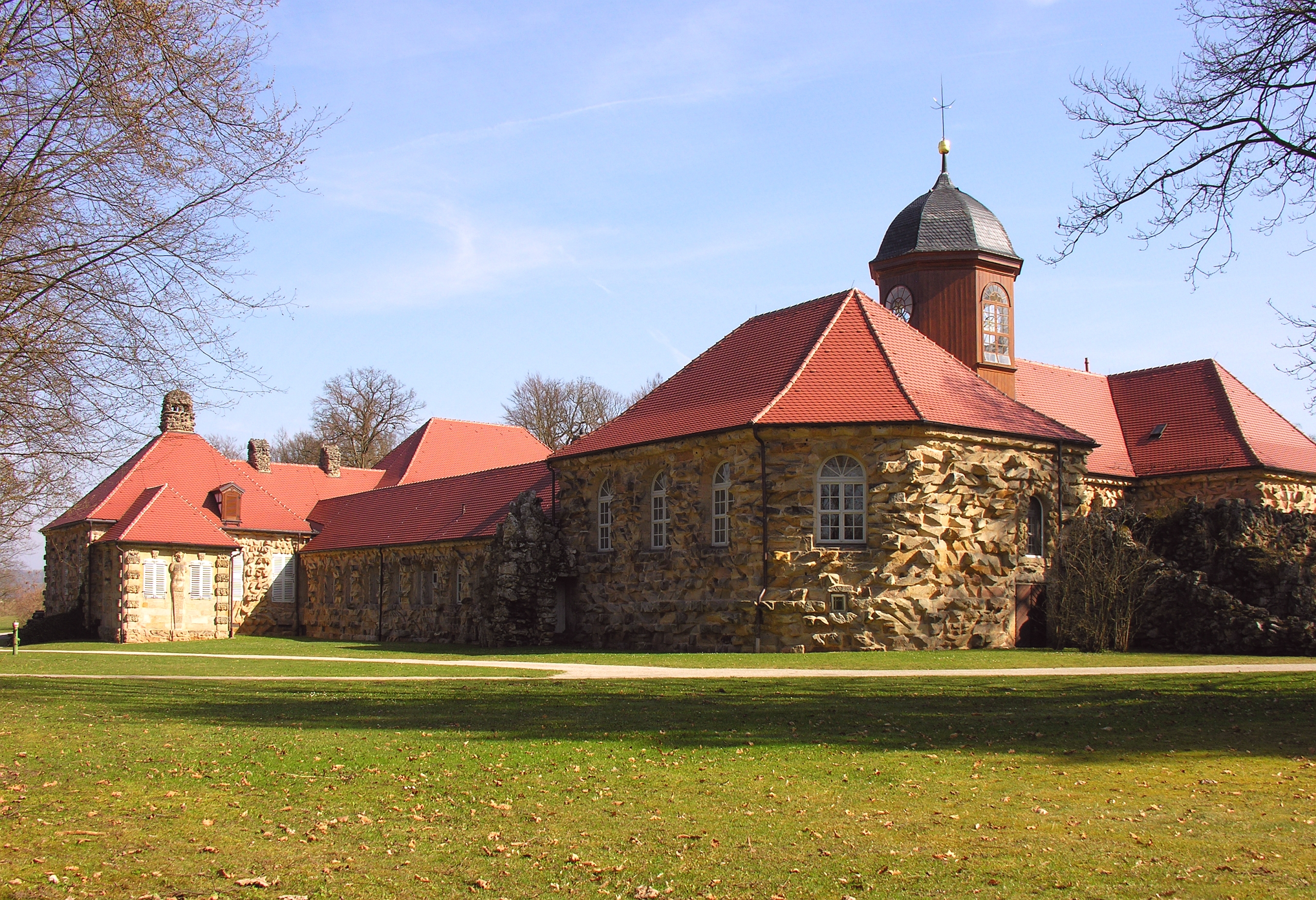
The Old Castle in perspective of southwest
