= Lutheran Evangelical Church =

Lutheran Evangelical Church or Evangelical Lutheran Church may refer to:

- Lutheran Evangelical Church in Africa—Zambia Diocese
- Evangelical Lutheran Church in America
- Lutheran Church of Australia (1966 merger of Evangelical Lutheran Church of Australia and United Evangelical Lutheran Church of Australia)
- Evangelical Lutheran Church of England
- Evangelical Lutheran Church of Finland
- Evangelical-Lutheran Church of Hanover
- Evangelical Lutheran Church of Iceland, known as the Church of Iceland
- Evangelical Lutheran Church in Italy
- Evangelical Lutheran Church in Lithuania
- Evangelical Lutheran Church in Malaysia
- Evangelical Lutheran Church in Russia, Ukraine, Kazakhstan and Central Asia
- Evangelical Lutheran Church of São Paulo
- Evangelical-Lutheran Church in Württemberg
