= Köberle =

Köberle or Koeberlé is a surname. Notable people with the surname are:

- Adolf Köberle (1898–1990), German theologian
- Eugène Koeberlé (1828–1915), French-German anatomist and gynecologist, inventor of a surgical clamp
- Fritz Köberle (1910–1983), Austrian-Brazilian physician and pathologist
- Georg Köberle (1819–1898), German writer and dramaturge
- Heinrich Köberle (1946–2023), German wheelchair racer and Paralympian
- Josef Köberle (1900–1978), German member of the state parliament
- Justus Köberle (1871–1908), German professor of theology at the University of Rostock
- Klaus Köberle (1931–2008), German politician (BHE, CDU), member of the Landtag of Schleswig-Holstein
- Korbinian Köberle (born 1924), German director, screenwriter and actor
- Michael Köberle (born 1965), German politician (CDU) and district administrator
- Paul von Köberle (1866–1948), German lieutenant general
- Rudolf Köberle (born 1953), German politician (CDU), member of the Landtag of Baden-Württemberg
- Samuel Koeberlé (born 2004), French footballer
- Walter Köberle (born 1949), German ice hockey player and coach
