= Bad Berneck im Fichtelgebirge =

Place in Bavaria, Germany

Bad Berneck i.Fichtelgebirge
- Town
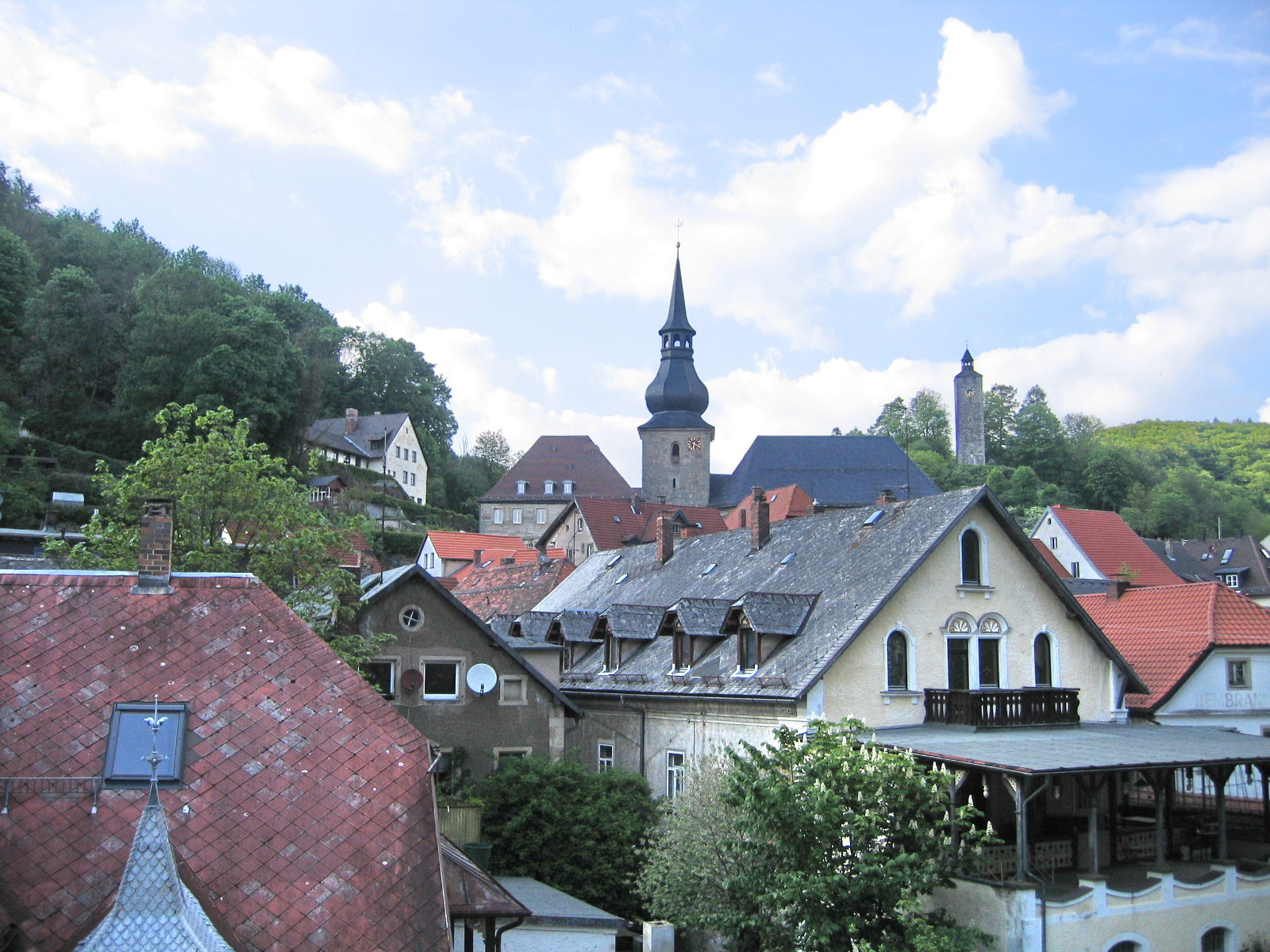
- Bad Berneck looking towards Holy Trinity Church and the Old Castle tower

- Coat of arms

- Location of Bad Berneck i.Fichtelgebirge within Bayreuth district
- Interactive map of Bad Berneck i.Fichtelgebirge
- Location within Germany Location within Bavaria
- Coordinates: 50°02′52″N 11°40′20″E
- Country: Germany
- State: Bavaria
- Admin. region: Oberfranken
- District: Bayreuth

Government
  - Mayor (2020–26): Jürgen Zinnert (SPD)

Area
  - Total: 38.26 km^{2} (14.77 sq mi)
- Elevation: 393 m (1,289 ft)

Population (2025-12-31)
  - Total: 4,276
  - Density: 111.8/km^{2} (289.5/sq mi)
- Time zone: UTC+01:00 (CET)
  - Summer (DST): UTC+02:00 (CEST)
- Postal codes: 95460
- Dialling codes: 09273
- Vehicle registration: BT
- Website: www.badberneck.de

Bad Berneck im Fichtelgebirge (German pronunciation: [baːt ˈbɛʁnɛk ʔɪm ˈfɪçtl̩ɡəˌbɪʁɡə], lit. 'Bad Berneck in the Fichtel Mountains') is a spa town in the district of Bayreuth, in Bavaria, Germany. It is situated on the White Main river, in the Fichtel Mountains, 13 km northeast of Bayreuth. It lies in the northern part of the Bavarian province of Upper Franconia. Since 1857 it has been a spa, initially based on its climate and whey products. In 1930 it became a Kneipp spa and, in 1950, a Kneipp health spa.

== Geography ==
The town of Bad Berneck lies on the western edge of the Fichtel Mountains in the Ölschnitz valley, which enters the White Main below the old town or Altstadt. The Mainberg (624 m above NN) and Wolfenberg (598 m above NN) are the highest peaks in the parish.

=== Neighbouring communities ===
Bad Berneck's neighbouring parishes (in clockwise order) are: Gefrees, Goldkronach, Bindlach, Harsdorf, Himmelkron and Marktschorgast. The town of Bayreuth is about 13 kilometres (8.1 mi) from Bad Berneck.

=== Sub-divisions ===
- Bärnreuth
- Birkenhof
- Brandleiten
- Bruckmühle
- Degmann
- Doebitsch
- Eichberg
- Escherlich
- Falkenhaus
- Föllmar
- Föllmarsberg
- Fornenmühle
- Frankenhammer
- Gesees
- Goldmühl
- Gothendorf
- Heinersreuth
- Hinterröhrenhof
- Hohenknoden
- Jägersruh
- Juliusthal
- Köslar
- Kolbenhof
- Kutschenrangen
- Mainleithen
- Micheldorf
- Mooshof
- Nenntmannsreuth
- Neudorf
- Neuhaus
- Rimlas
- Rödlasberg
- Schmelz
- Steinbühl
- Vorderröhrenhof
- Warmeleithen
- Wasserknoden

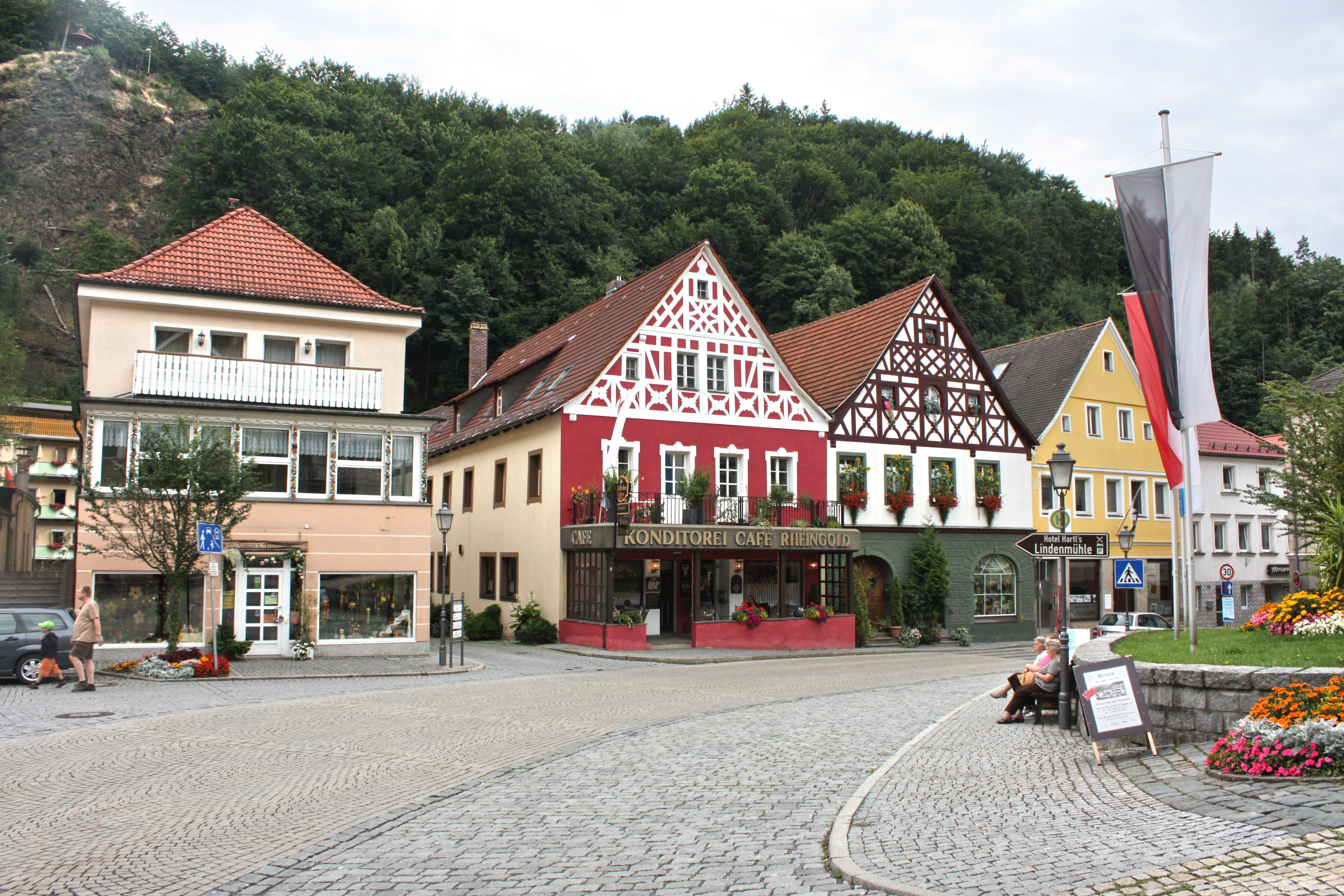
Market place

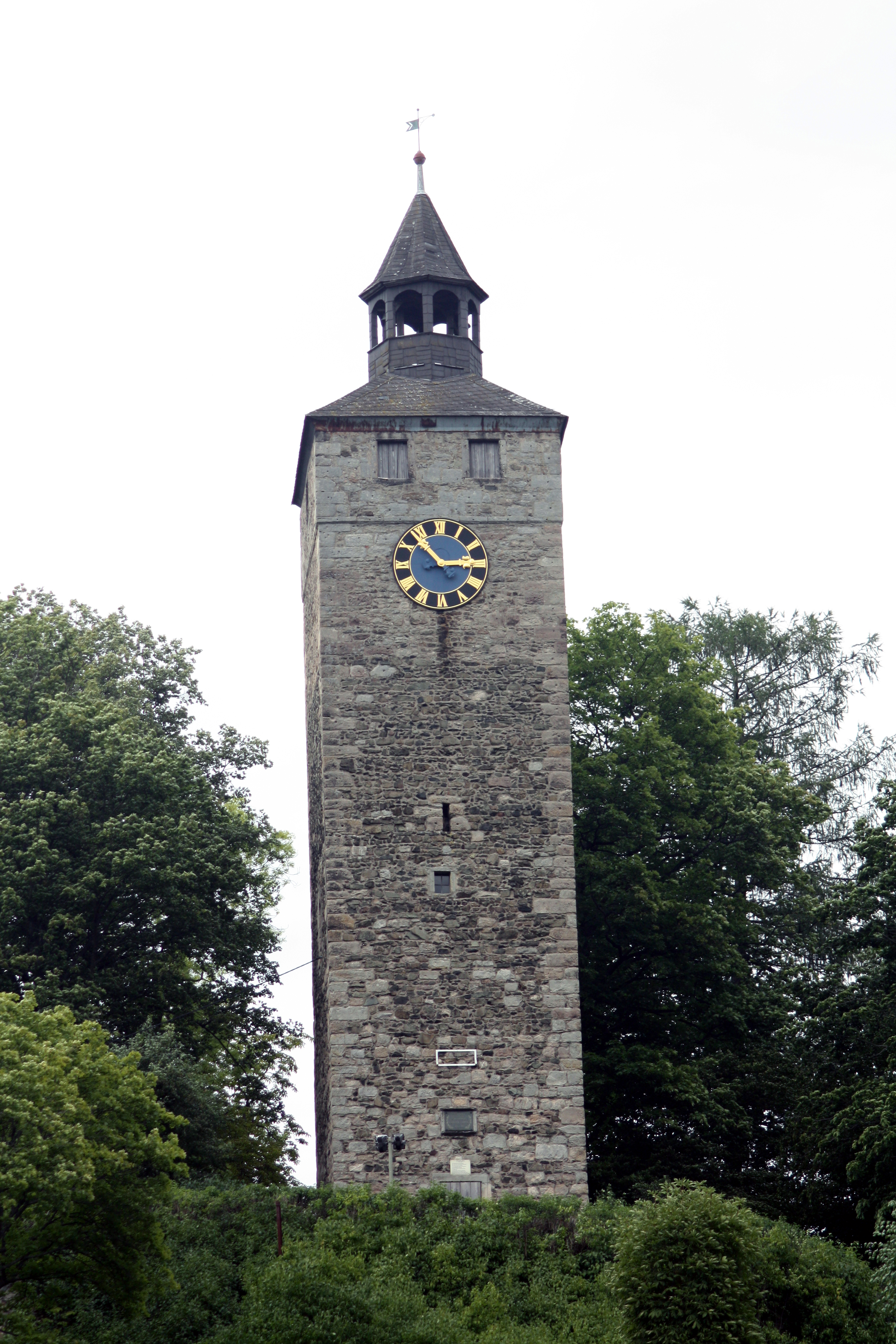
Castle tower

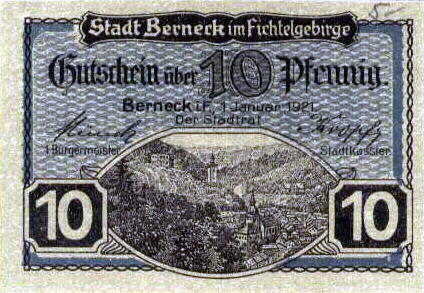
Notgeld (emergency currency) from 1921: a 10 Pfennig note

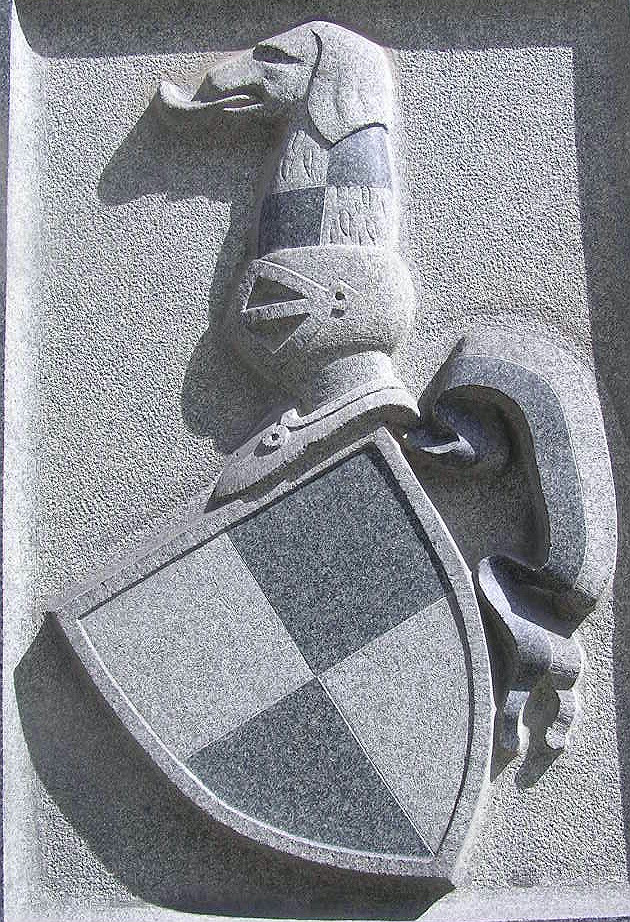
Coat of arms on the town hall

== History ==
The exact date of Bad Berneck's foundation is not known, but up to 1057 the place was under the control of the lords of Babenberg and later the counts of Andechs. In 1167 Berneck was first mentioned as a castle, built by Ulrich II Walpote of Berneck, without obtaining the approval of the Bishop of Bamberg.

Until 1202 Berneck was under Bamberg rule. From 1203 to 1248 it belonged again to the counts of Andechs-Merania. In 1248, following the extinction of House of Merania, it fell to the counts of Orlamünde and in 1341 to the burgraves of Nuremberg (and, later, the margraves of Brandenburg-Bayreuth). It is first recorded as a town on 18 November 1357. In 1375 Berneck was almost completely burned down and it was destroyed by fire again in 1431 and 1462 during the Hussite Wars. Plague and famine also struck the town. In 1478 the Marquis gave Berneck to Veit von Wallenroth with the stipulation that the fortifications were to be rebuilt. The castle of Hohenberneck was built. In 1495 the town had 204 residents in 76 households. After the death of Veit von Wallenroth the place went to Albert of Wirsberg, the Amtmann of Stein. He further fortified the now ruined stronghold and the family acted as robber barons against Nuremberg. The latter had the castle bombarded into ruins in 1533. In 1632, in the middle of the Thirty Years War the place was razed. This happened again on 13 May 1692 - only five houses and a mill were spared.

In 1724, 15 gypsy women were hanged and buried under the Gypsy Oak (Zigeunereiche). The men had fled. The survivors were driven across the border.

In 1732 Margrave George Frederick Charles of Brandenburg-Bayreuth had pearl oysters introduced into the Ölschnitz, probably to supplement the state's finances In the wars of 1796-1815 the small town had to pay several contributions and provide billeting. In 1806 Blücher visited Berneck and the Blüchersruh was named after him. The former office (Amt) of the Prussian principality of Bayreuth, established since 1792, fell to France in 1807 as a result of the Treaty of Tilsit and, in 1810, went to Bavaria. Around 1830 the first spa business was established (based on whey products). Within Bavaria, Berneck was initially the seat of a regional court (Landgericht), later a district office (Bezirksamt). The territory of the district was affiliated to the neighbouring district offices of Bayreuth, Kulmbach and Münchberg. The majority of the Amt territory was controlled by the district office at Bayreuth. In 1896 it was connected to the railway network.

On 1 October 1929 the district of Berneck was dissolved. In the 1930s, Adolf Hitler spent the night in the then fashionable Bube Hotel on several occasions during the festival in Bayreuth. In 1930, Kneipp cures were introduced and its recognition as a spa came in 1950. However, since the 1970s, its role as a spa has tailed off considerably.

== Politics ==
=== Town council ===
The town council has 16 members. The allocation of seats (as of August 2023) is:

- CSU 7
- SPD 5
- FWG 3
- Grüne 1

The mayor (Bürgermeister) is Jürgen Zinnert (SPD), and the deputy mayor is Alexander Popp from the FWG.

== Culture and points of interest ==
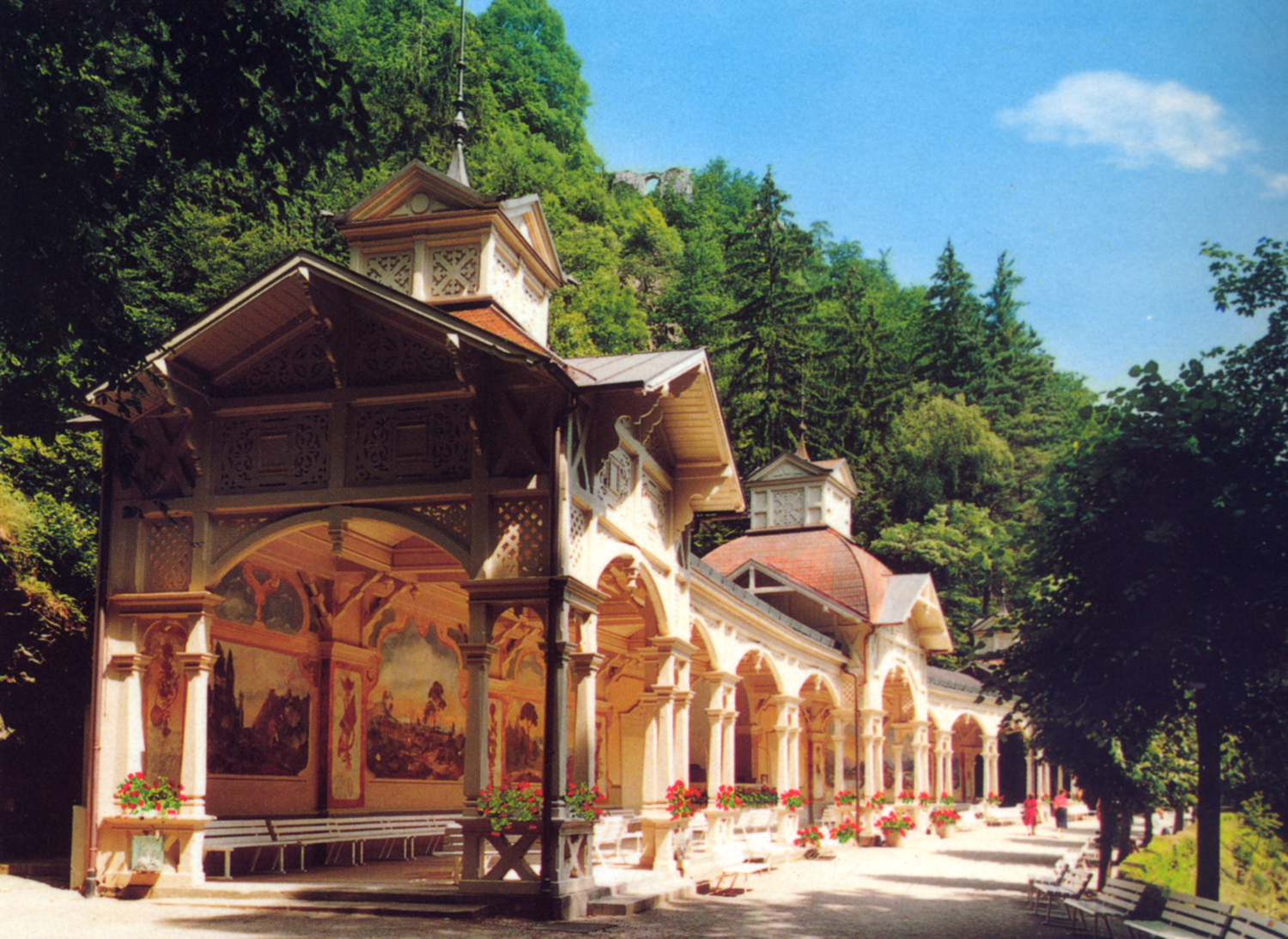
The spa park and its colonnades

- Ruins of the Walpote castle of Wallenrode, Hohenberneck Castle, the Old Castle and St. Mary's chapel, and the water castle of Alt-Berneck.
- Dendrological Gardens in the Rother Park with trees from all over the world.
- Market place with historic timber-framed houses.
- Spa park with colonnades.
- The open air stage by the Castle Tower is used from June to September by the Free Theatre of Bayreuth.
- Protestant church of the Holy Trinity (Zur Heiligen Dreifaltigkeit).

== Economy and infrastructure ==
The largest employer in the town is the Frenzelit-Werke, with approximately 450 employees worldwide. The company is owned by the Wagner family and manufactures seals. The second largest employer was Reitz group, with about 200 employees in Bad Berneck (about 500 total). The Reitz Group with its brands Popp, düwi and Schwaiger manufactures electrical products. On 18 February 2009 the Reitz group filed for bankruptcy.

=== Transport ===
Bad Berneck lies at the intersection of B 2 (Hof - Bayreuth) and B 303 (Kronach - Eger) federal highways. Bad Berneck is connected to the motorway network via the junction of Berneck/Himmelkron (5 km distant on the A 9 and A 70 motorways. The nearest railway stations are located in Marktschorgast, Neuenmarkt and Bayreuth.

=== Education ===
Bad Berneck has the Sebastian-Kneipp Volkschule (primary and secondary school) and two kindergartens.

== Notable people ==
- Adolf Köberle (1898–1990), Protestant theologian
- Carl Heidenreich (1901–1964), German-American painter
- Ulrike Meinhof (1934–1976) journalist and RAF terrorist; lived in Bad Berneck in 1945–1946
