= Carl Heidenreich =

German painter

- Born: 4 October 1901; Bad Berneck, Germany
- Died: 6 September 1965 (aged 63); Frankfurt, Germany
- Known for: Painting

Carl Heidenreich (1901-1965) was a German American artist and an important contributor to the Abstract Expressionist movement in New York.

== Life in Germany ==
Heidenreich was born on October 4, 1901, in Bad Berneck and studied art in the National Arts School in Munich, later becoming one of the first students of Hans Hofmann at his private art school in Munich, the Schule für Bildende Kunst (School of Fine Arts), considered the most progressive in Germany. In 1922, Heidenreich moved to Berlin, where he supported himself as a scene painter in the UFA studios in Babelsberg. Since the mid-1920s, Heidenreich exhibited actively, including exhibitions at Berlin Secession and the Academy of Arts in Berlin. His work was strongly rooted in German Expressionism, as evidenced by such paintings as Street Encounter (1932).

== Politics ==
Heidenreich was a member of the Communist Party of Germany (Opposition) (KPD-O). After the Nazi rise to power in 1933, Heidenreich was deemed a degenerate artist and his upcoming solo exhibition in Berlin was abruptly cancelled. He was imprisoned by the SS at Berlin's Moabit prison, used as the detention center by the Gestapo. After his release in 1934, Heidenreich escaped to Spain, leaving behind nearly 300 works, most of them destroyed and lost. Deported to France in 1935, he returned to Spain at the start of the Spanish Civil War. Heidenreich joined the Bataillon de choque Rovira of the Partido Obrero de Unificación Marxista (POUM), an Anarcho-Syndicalist unit within the anti-Stalinist Spanish Communist Party, memorialized by George Orwell in his book, Homage to Catalonia. In 1938, he was incarcerated by the Stalinist-controlled Catalonian government and tortured in Barcelona's Modelo prison. A number of paintings and works on paper, documenting this period of Heidenreich's life, survived in private collections. Among them are a series of prison sketches.

In early 1939, as Franco's Falangist forces swept through Barcelona, ending the Spanish Civil War, Heidenreich fled back to Paris, where he stayed until the outbreak of World War II. Imprisoned in 1940 at the camp Cepoy/Loiret as an enemy alien, he made his way to Marseilles. In 1941, with the support of the American Guild for German Cultural Freedom, he received a visa from the US Consulate; in May 1941 he left on the S.S. Capitain Paul Lemerle, reportedly the last ship allowed by the British to pass through the Straits of Gibraltar. After some weeks' internment on the island of Martinique, he was able to book passage on the Duc d'Aumale, arriving in New York at the end of May. An important group of watercolors records his impressions of the Caribbean island.

Gabriele Saure, Carl Heidenreich (Goethe-Institut, New York)

== Art Career in the US ==
Heidenreich settled in New York, where he was welcomed by the community of German and German Jewish refugee intellectuals, including Hannah Arendt and her husband Heinrich Blücher. In 1949, Heidenreich became an American citizen and had a first major exhibition at Harry Salpeter Gallery. Throughout the 1950s and early 1960s, Heidenreich exhibited regularly, his work was widely collected, and he made significant contributions to Abstract Expressionism, both as a painter and watercolorist. His works are included in the collections of the Whitney Museum of American Art, the Smithsonian American Art Museum, and the Brooklyn Museum. In 1965, Heidenreich returned to Germany for the first time in 30 years to attend his first postwar exhibitions in Frankfurt and Berlin. Already suffering from a serious illness, he died in Frankfurt on September 6, 1965.

A significant number of artworks left behind in Heidenreich's New York studio have been cared for by family friends and collectors, primarily Richard M. Buxbaum and Emanuel Wolf, who have maintained the artist's legacy through continued exhibitions and publications. In 2004, Heidenreich’s work was shown along with his teacher’s (Hans Hofmann) at a major exhibition at the Berkeley Art Museum/Pacific Film Archive, which published a catalog with essays by Peter Selz, Alla Efimova, and Gabriele Saure. In 2006, the Goethe Institut in New York presented a retrospective of Heidenreich’s American work; in 2011 a major exhibit was mounted at the Pankow/Berlin Artists' Collective Gallery.

The Carl Heidenreich Foundation, established in 2015, supports exhibits of his work at US and European museums, as well as continuing research and a virtual catalogue raisonée on www.carlheidenreichfoundation.org.
