= Heidenreich =

Heidenreich is a German surname which may be translated as "Land of the Heathen," or "Power of the Heathens," or "Realm of the Heathens". Notable people with the surname include:

- Carl Heidenreich, German painter
- David Elias Heidenreich (1638–1688), German writer
- Eli Heidenreich (born 2003), American football player
- Elke Heidenreich (born 1943), German TV journalist and presenter, novelist, librettist, literary critic
- Herbert Heidenreich (born 1954), German footballer
- Jakub Heidenreich, Czech footballer
- Jon Heidenreich (born 1972), American wrestler
- Maximilian Heidenreich (1967–2024), German footballer

Heydenreich is a variation of the name. Notable people include:

- Gustav Heinrich Heydenreich († 1897), German entomologist
- Karl Heinrich Heydenreich (1764–1801), German philosopher
- Ludwig Heinrich Heydenreich (1903–1978), German art historian
- Michał Heydenreich (1831–1886), Polish general

== See also ==
- Heidenreichstein in Austria
