= Ölschnitz (White Main) =

River in Germany

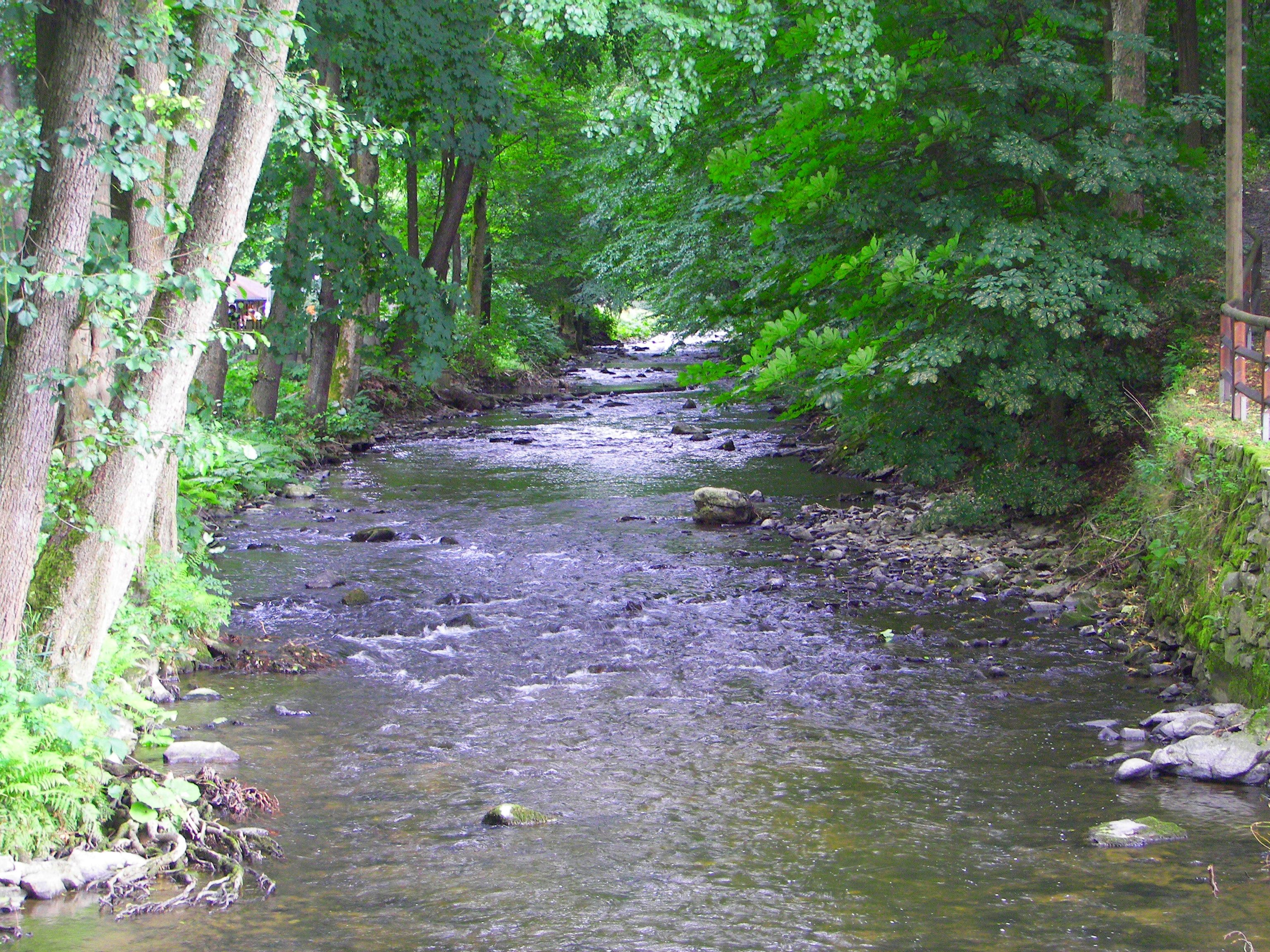
- Ölschnitz in Bad Berneck

Location
- Country: Germany
- State: Bavaria
- Location: Upper Franconia
- Reference no.: DE: 24112

Physical characteristics
- Source
  - location: In the village of Solg (borough of Münchberg)
  - coordinates: 50°09′59″N 11°43′27″E
  - elevation: ca. 600 m
- Mouth
  - location: near Bad Berneck into the White Main
  - coordinates: 50°02′33″N 11°40′06″E
  - elevation: ca. 376 m
- Length: 22.1 km (13.7 mi)

Basin features
- Progression: White Main→ Main→ Rhine→ North Sea

The Ölschnitz is a right-bank, northern headstream of the White Main in the German province of Upper Franconia in Bavaria. It is 22.1 kilometres (13.7 mi) long.

== Course ==
The Ölschnitz has its source at an impoundment and granite well stone in Solg, a village in the borough of Münchberg. It discharges into the White Main near Bad Berneck. The Ölschnitz flows from Solg through a wide valley to the village of Ölschnitz. It then flows down to Tennersreuth, passes under the A 9 motorway, supplies water for the Streitau Mill and continues to Böseneck. From here the little river snakes through an ever-narrower valley. After many bends it reaches the Entenmühle ("duck mill"), then flows around the hill spur near Stein in a large curve before cutting through the hard, diabase rock in a steep, rocky, narrow valley, rich in flora, and reaching the spa park (Kurpark) at Bad Berneck. After almost 19 km it discharges into the White Main. The Ölschnitz valley between the Entenmühle and Bad Berneck, through which the Westweg and Jean-Paul-Weg trails also run, is one of the most beautiful valleys in the Fichtelgebirge.

== Economic utilisation ==
Along the course of the stream, water power was used to drive many mill wheels. In 1536, the townsfolk of Berneck were giving fishing rights in the Ölsnitz and, in 1692, it was described as the "best trout stream in the Fichtelberge". In 1732, an ordinance concerning the Ölschnitz was issued by the Margrave of Bayreuth for the protection of the freshwater pearl mussels introduced there. Between 1733 and 1810, 6,000 pearls were harvested. Pearl fishing came under the supervision of a pearl inspector and, after 1810, the Bavarian Forestry Department.

== Places ==
The Ölschnitz flows through the following places:

- Münchberg, borough Solg
- Stammbach, borough Ölschnitz
- Stammbach, borough Tennersreuth
- Gefrees, borough Streitauermühle
- Gefrees, borough Böseneck
- Gefrees, borough Entenmühle
- Gefrees, borough Stein
- Bad Berneck

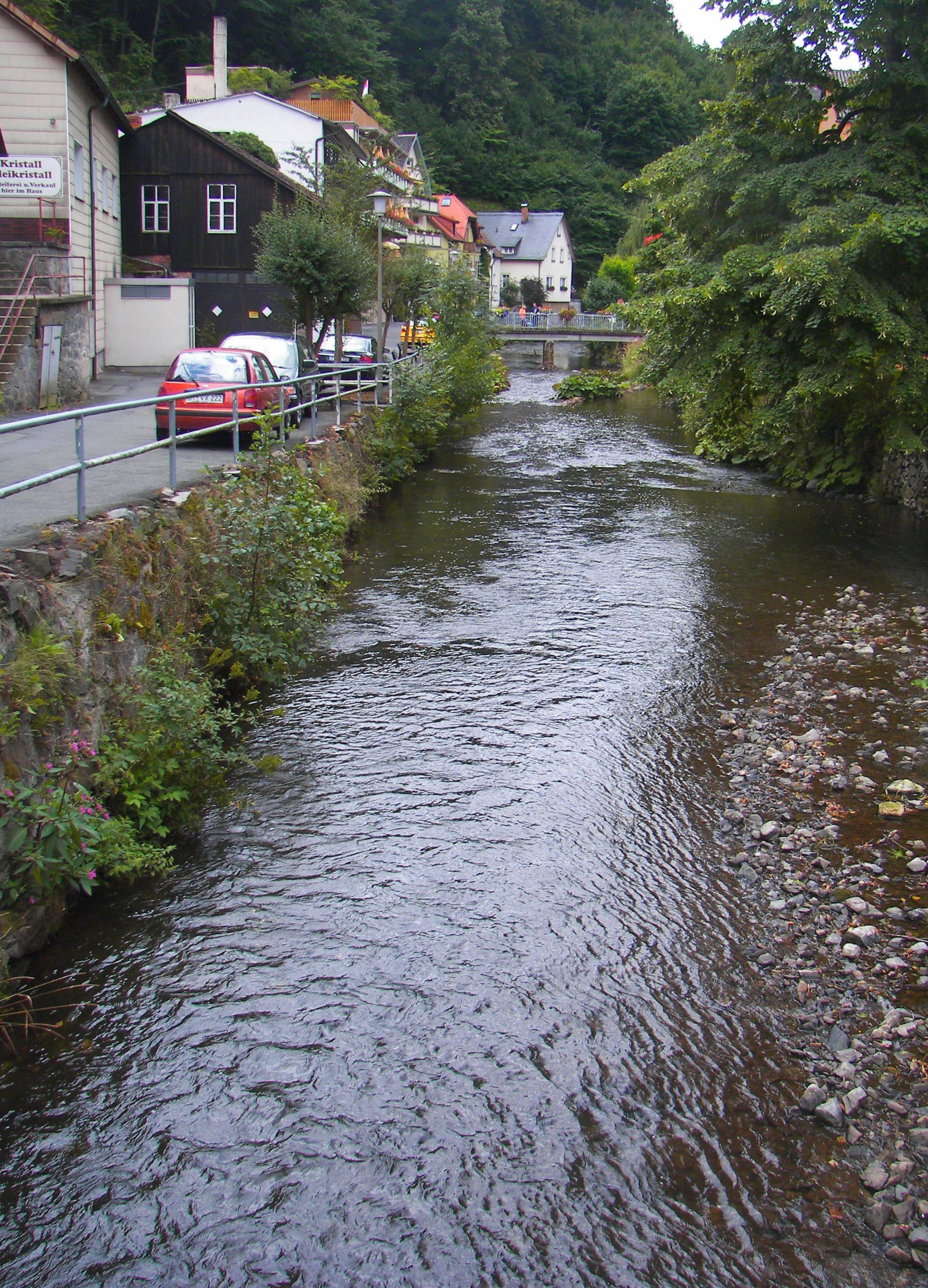
The Ölschnitz in Bad Berneck

== Tributaries ==
- Querenbach (left)
- Lahmabach (right)
- Benkersbach (left)
- Grundbach (right)
- Angerbach (right)
- Rieglersbach (left)
- Schleifenbach (right)
- Lübnitzbach (left)
- Steingraben (right)
- Metzlersreuther Bach (left)
- Bärnreuther Graben (left)

== See also ==
- List of rivers of Bavaria

== Sources ==
- Konrad Arneth/Ernst Eichler: Slawische Flurnamen in der ehemaligen Markgrafschaft Bayreuth, in: Jahrbuch für Fränkische Landesforschung 1966, p. 191
- Dietmar Herrmann: Perlen in der Ölschnitz, in: The Siebenstern 2003, p. 11
- Dietmar Herrmann: Lexikon Fichtelgebirge, Hof 2000 (A-Z) Ölschnitz
- Rudolf Klupp: Fischerei in Oberfranken, 1985, p. 214
- Seidel Chr.: Eine Ölschnitzwanderung von der Quelle bis zur Mündung,in: The Siebenstern 1937, p. 169
- Vogt Ludwig: The Gewässernamen des Fichtelgebirges, in: The Siebenstern 1959, p. 113
- Max Wirth: The Ölschnitzquelle in Solg bei Münchberg, in: The Siebenstern 1970, p. 118
