= Evangelical Lutheran Church of São Paulo =

Coordinates: 23°32′31″S 46°38′16″W

Lutheran Church of São Paulo
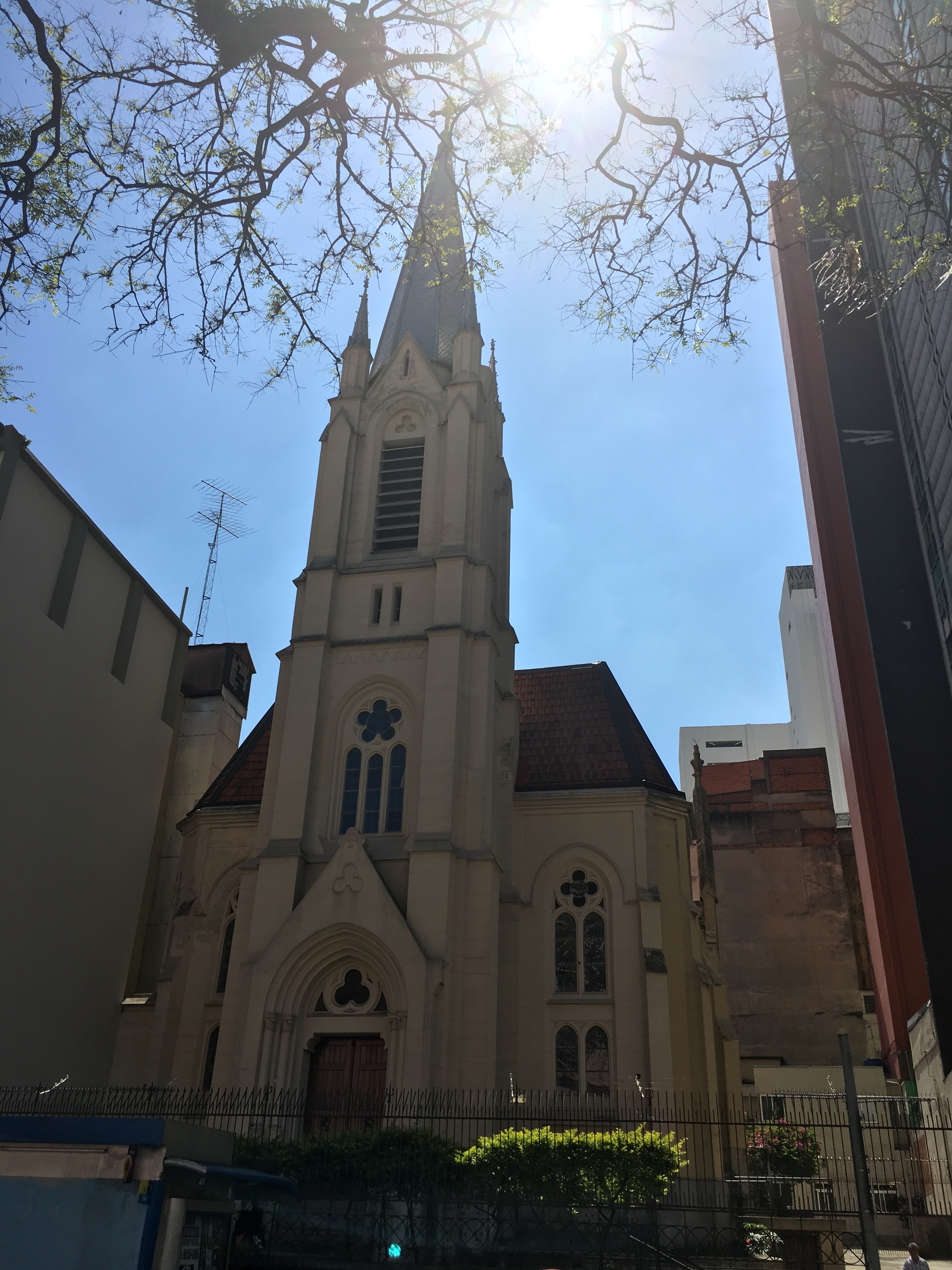
- The church in 2016
- Interactive map of the Lutheran Church of São Paulo area

General information
- Status: Under re-construction
- Architectural style: Neogothic
- Location: São Paulo, Brazil
- Construction started: 1907
- Completed: 1909
- Destroyed: 1 May 2018

Height
- Height: 40 m (130 ft)

Technical details
- Structural system: Ruin
- Floor count: 4

The Evangelical Lutheran Church of São Paulo (Portuguese: Igreja Evangélica Luterana de São Paulo), also known as Martin Luther Church, is one of the headquarters of the Southeast Synod of the Evangelical Church of Lutheran Confession in Brazil, located near the Largo do Paiçandu, in the historic center of São Paulo. The temple was founded on 25 December 1908, being one of the main meeting places of the German community in the first half of the twentieth century.

Initially, it was called by the German name Stadtkirche, being later known as Mother Church and then, only in 1991, being baptized as Martin Luther Church. It is considered the first evangelical Lutheran parish in the city of São Paulo, as well as the first temple in the neo-Gothic style to be built in the city.

== History ==
The evangelical Lutheran community that lived in São Paulo since the beginning of the nineteenth century was organized autonomously, without the initial presence of pastors. The group had difficulties during the course of the 1800s due to the Catholic regime that existed in Brazil.

The first meeting of the German Lutheran community in São Paulo occurred on 26 December 1858, at the drugstore Ao Veado d'Ouro. The ceremonies were performed in the German language, due to the large number of Germans among the visitors, who were attended by pastors of Rio Claro and Campinas until 1871, when Pastor Emil Bamberg founded the first Evangelical Lutheran community in São Paulo, "Egreja Evangélica Alleman".

Beginning 15 November 1889, with the Proclamation of the Republic of Brazil and the separation of the state and the church, members of the Evangelical Lutheran community had more freedom for the development of religion. On 29 October 1891, Pastor Emil Bamberg was able to organize the community, which initially brought together 80 families. The registration of the statutes of the religious association, however, was only published in 1907.

While Lutheran evangelicals raised donations for the construction of the first temple in São Paulo, the services were also held in a Presbyterian Church.

=== Construction ===
In 1906, the brothers Daniel and Hermann Heydenreich donated land in the then street Visconde of the White River, numbers 10 and 12 (current Rio Branco Avenue, number 34). The donation record only occurred on 3 April 1907, 11 days before the foundation stone was laid. The work was completed only on 28 November 1909, and was the scene of worship in the Evangelical Lutheran community before the end of construction.

=== Inauguration ===
In August 1908, the church's pastoral house, at the bottom of the land, was inaugurated with the creation of an administrative office. Four months later, on 25 December 1908, in the midst of the Christmas celebration, the Martin Luther church was inaugurated, then named Stadtkirche in German, which means "City Church".

During the festival, there were Christmas carols chanted by a choir, honored by about five hundred people. Bells, also donated by the Heydenreich brothers, were sounded in the middle of the ceremony. With the completion of the work only on 28 November 1909, was also organized a party, with the presence of pastors of the Rio de Janeiro, Campinas, Rio Claro, of Santos and Petrópolis.

=== First World War ===
In the midst of World War I, the Evangelical Lutheran community, predominantly of German origin, struggled to stay in São Paulo, due precisely to the proximity to Germany, which was part of the Triple Alliance and ended up being defeated in the conflict.

In 1917, the Brazilian government broke off relations with Germany and, shortly afterwards, in São Paulo, the celebration of cults in celebration for the 400 years of the Protestant Reformation was prohibited. In the following years, without the money received by the German community, the church suffered with a strong financial crisis.

=== Second World War ===
New problems arise with the beginning of World War II, with Brazil breaking relations once again with Germany, and in 1943, by sending troops to fight against the Axis powers. During this period, by the determination of the then president Getúlio Vargas, the celebrations could no longer be performed in German. The introduction of Portuguese, however, generated a strong integration of the community with Brazilians.

== Architectural features ==
The Martin Luther Church was designed by the architect Guilherme von Eÿe, also responsible for the construction of the São Paulo Conservatory of Dramatic and Musical Conservatory, completed in 1907.

First building built in the Neogothic style in São Paulo, the temple sits in an area of just over 1012 square meters and has a ground floor area of 465 square meters. The church has a unique tower, which is centralized to the main facade. The main access of the church is through a wooden door with two leaves.

=== Reform ===
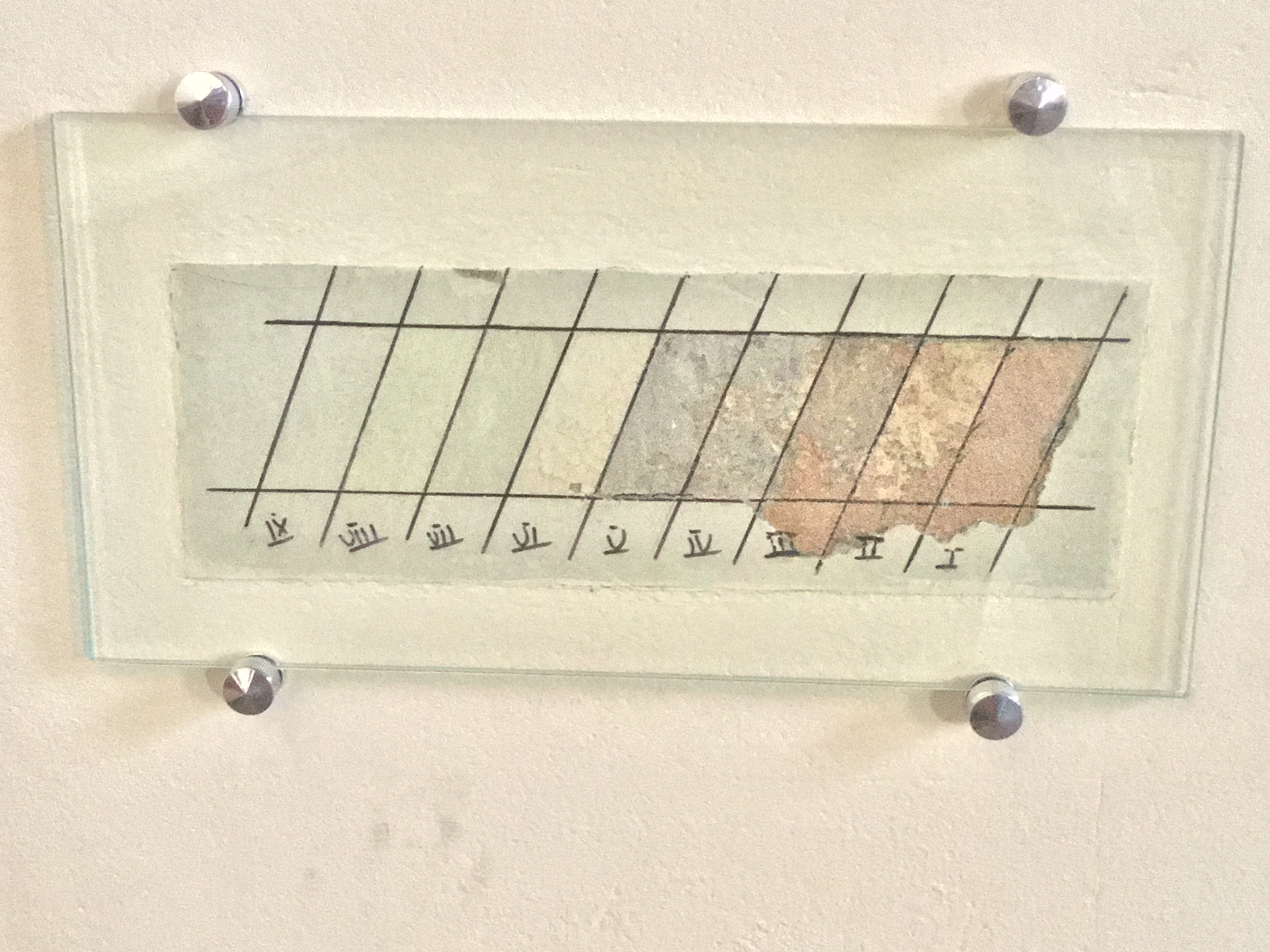
Layer study of inner walls of Martin Luther Lutheran Church

Between 2012 and 2013, the Martin Luther Church underwent an internal reform. A large study was conducted by Companhia do Restauro to retake the initial characteristics of the church, according to what the Municipal Council for the Preservation of the Historical, Cultural and Environmental Heritage of the City of São Paulo determined. Due to lack of money, the restoration could not be made in the outer area of the temple. The Lutheran Church of São Paulo tried to get support from the Rouanet Law, but could not have access to the economic incentive.

=== Organ ===
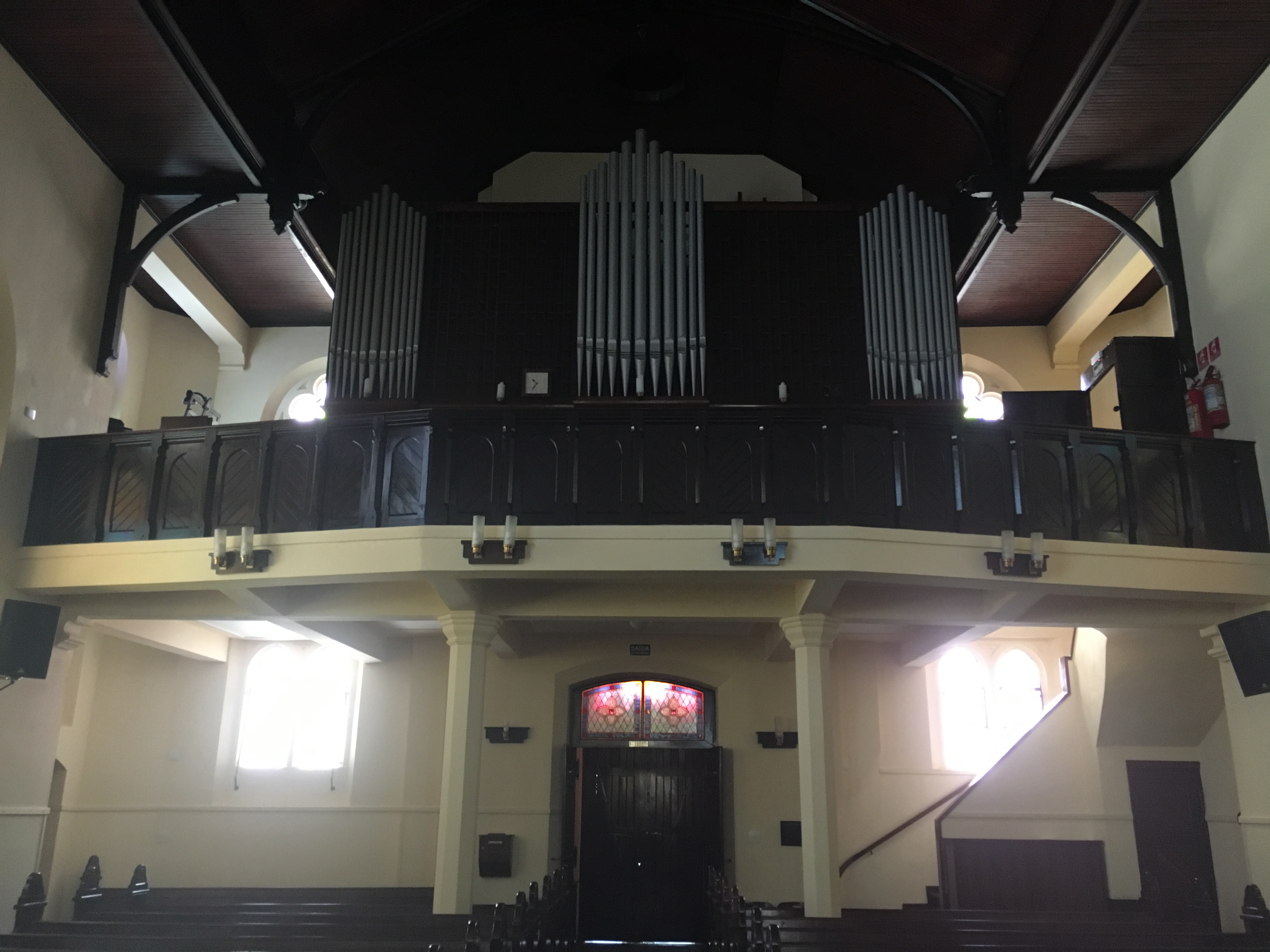
Front door of the Martin Luther Church with detail for the Walcker Music Organ on the top floor

In 1909 was inaugurated in the church an organ constructed by the Walcker House that, originally, had 12 registries and 620 pipes. The instrument was reformed in 1956, when the number of pipes surpassed 1,090 pipes. A new extension in 1995, made by the organist Ricardo Clerice, caused the organ to reach the current 1,146 pipes.

=== Stained glass ===
The Martin Luther Church has stained glass, produced by Casa Conrado, of the stained glass artist Conrado Sorgenicht, who produced the pieces of the Market and the Municipal Theater of São Paulo. In the temple of the Rio Branco avenue, the stained glass exposes the Luther Seal and passages of the gospel.

== Historical significance ==
The Martin Luther Church was a symbol for the settlement of the German community in São Paulo and for the union of the Lutherans in the city. No matter how many groups already existed in the neighborhoods of Vila Ema, Vila Zelina, Vila Prudente and Santo Amaro, the church of the center became the religious symbol of that town, that already divided spaces like Deutsche Schule, and the Sport Club Germánia (current Esporte Clube Pinheiros), since the mid-nineteenth century.

Despite the difficulties of the two world wars, the temple became a reference for Lutheran evangelicals in the city of São Paulo.

=== Heritage ===
The Church Martin Luther was registered in 1992 by the Municipal Council of Preservation of the Historical, Cultural and Environmental Patrimony of the City of São Paulo and in 2012 by the Council for the Defense of Historical, Archaeological, Artistic and Tourist Heritage (CONDEPHAAT) of the State of São Paulo. The temple is under Protection Level 1, which requires the integral preservation of the good.

== Current state ==
Currently, Martin Luther Church is in the midst of busy buildings of large stature, which have been occupied by homeless people, and have problems with serious external malfunctions due to time and vandalism. The temple continues to be a meeting place of the German community in São Paulo, but has suffered with the reduction and aging of the faithful. The difficulties also appear due to the large number of evangelical churches in the city, which caused the spreading of the regulars.

In addition to the services that take place every Sunday, the church organizes every Friday a snack for street dwellers in the central region of São Paulo, who can register and keep the documents in the temple to avoid losses and breakdowns.

== Collapse ==
At dawn on 1 May 2018, a fire occurred at Edifício Wilton Paes de Almeida, a building occupied by homeless people, located alongside the church. The building collapsed and destroyed part of the church, including most of the stained glass and other historical pieces.

== Reconstruction ==
The Lutheran Church is to spend more than R$4.2 million (2019) (US$1.06 million) to rebuild 80% of the destroyed structure on 1 May 2018. Works began on 27 March 2019. A piano and a German pipe organ of 1908 was also damaged, valued at R$1 million (US$253,518), had minor breakdowns. For safety, the instrument was disassembled and returned after the reconstruction was completed.

With 30% of the total amount for reconstruction collected by the church (around R$1.7 million (US$430,979.8), the first phase of work began on 27 March 2019. The money was obtained through property insurance and donations from the faithful. The first stage of the work consisted of strengthening the foundations, rebuilding the side wall, roof and lining, stained glass frame and mooring of the altar. Throughout the following stages, were planned the revision of the tower structure and the reconstruction of the stained glass, benches, chandeliers and more. The rebuilt was finished in 2021.

== Gallery ==
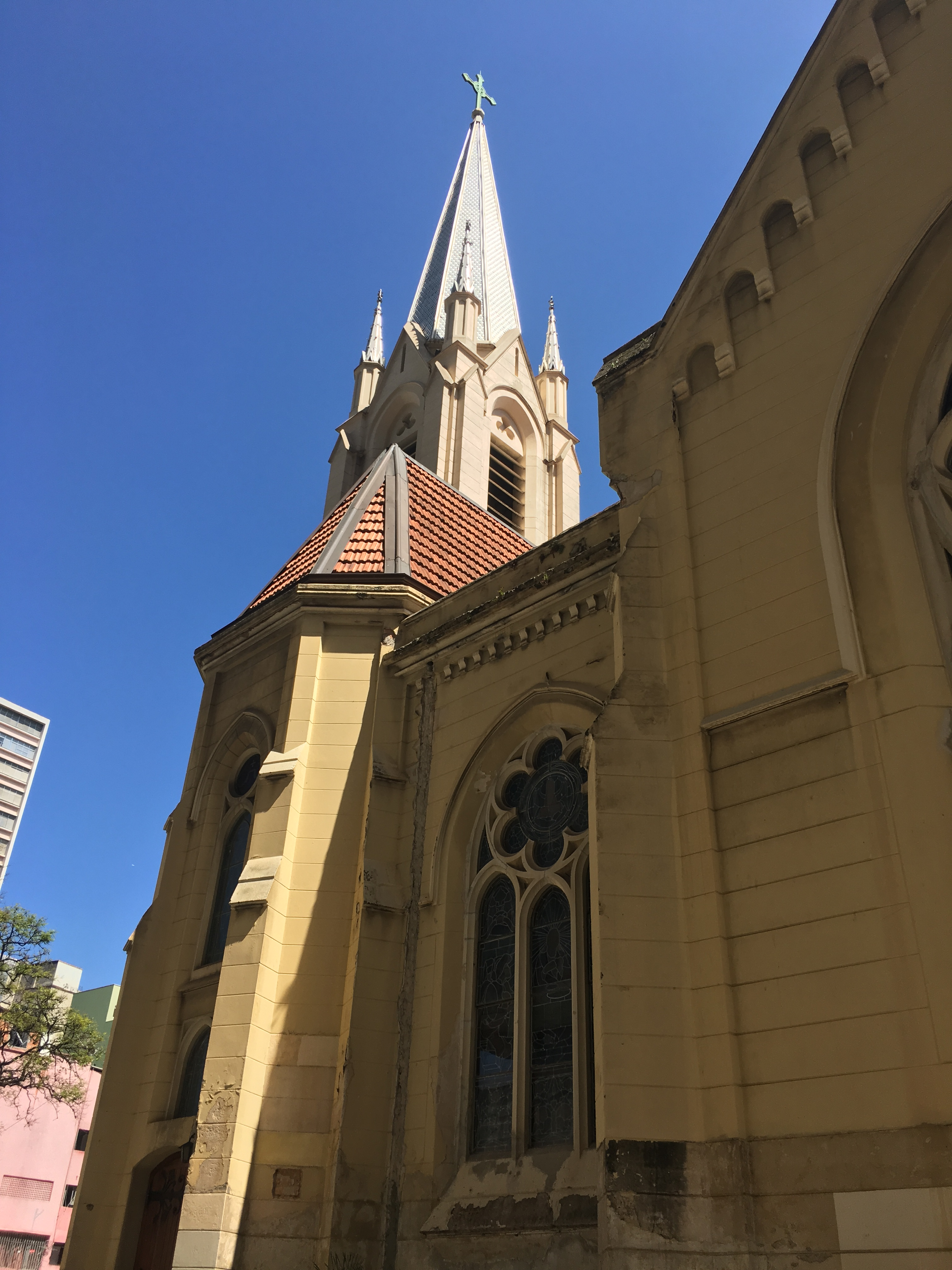
Rear view of Martin Luther Lutheran Church front tower

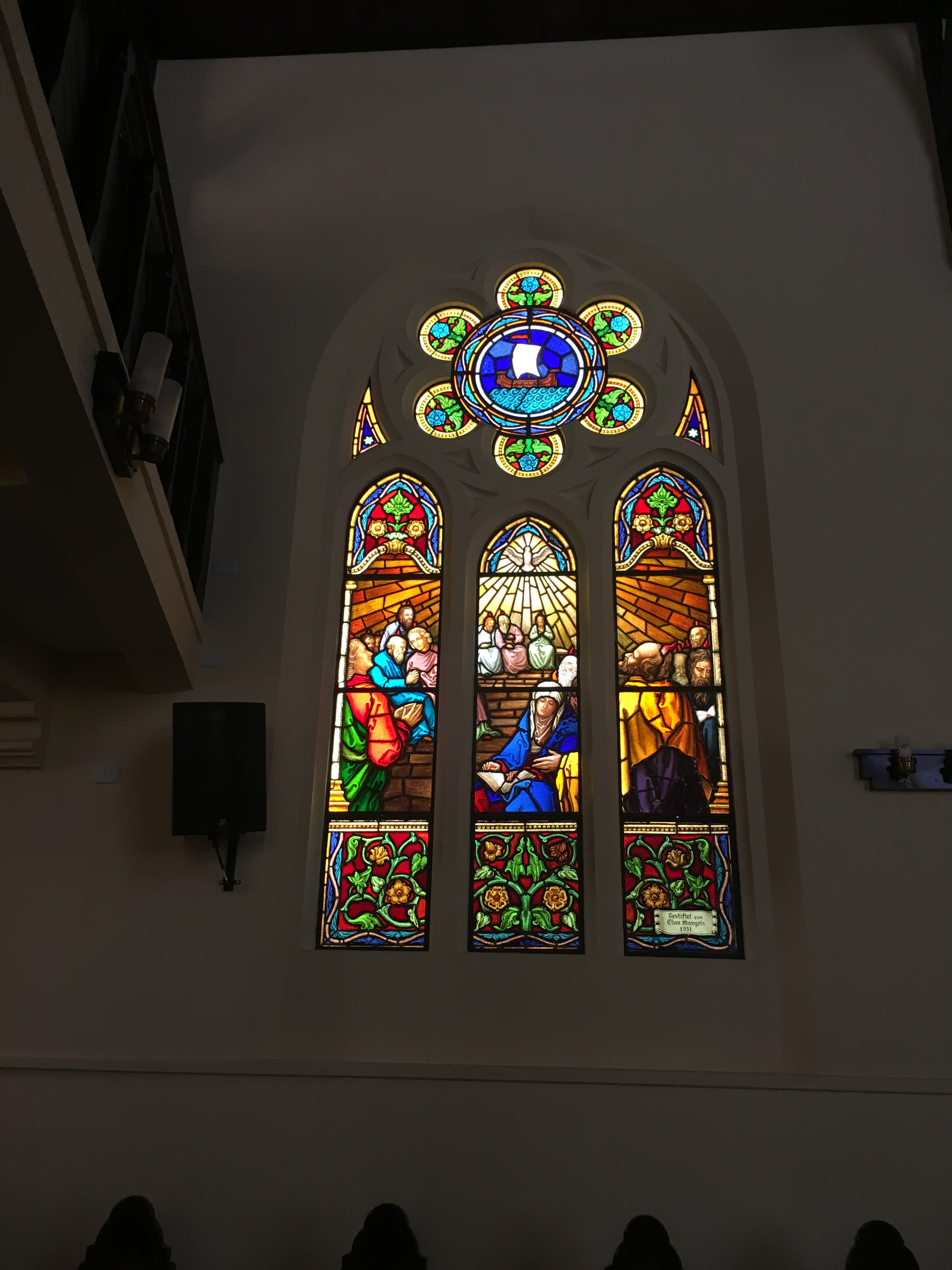
One of the stained glass windows of the Martin Luther Church, depicting Pentecost, produced by the Conrad House

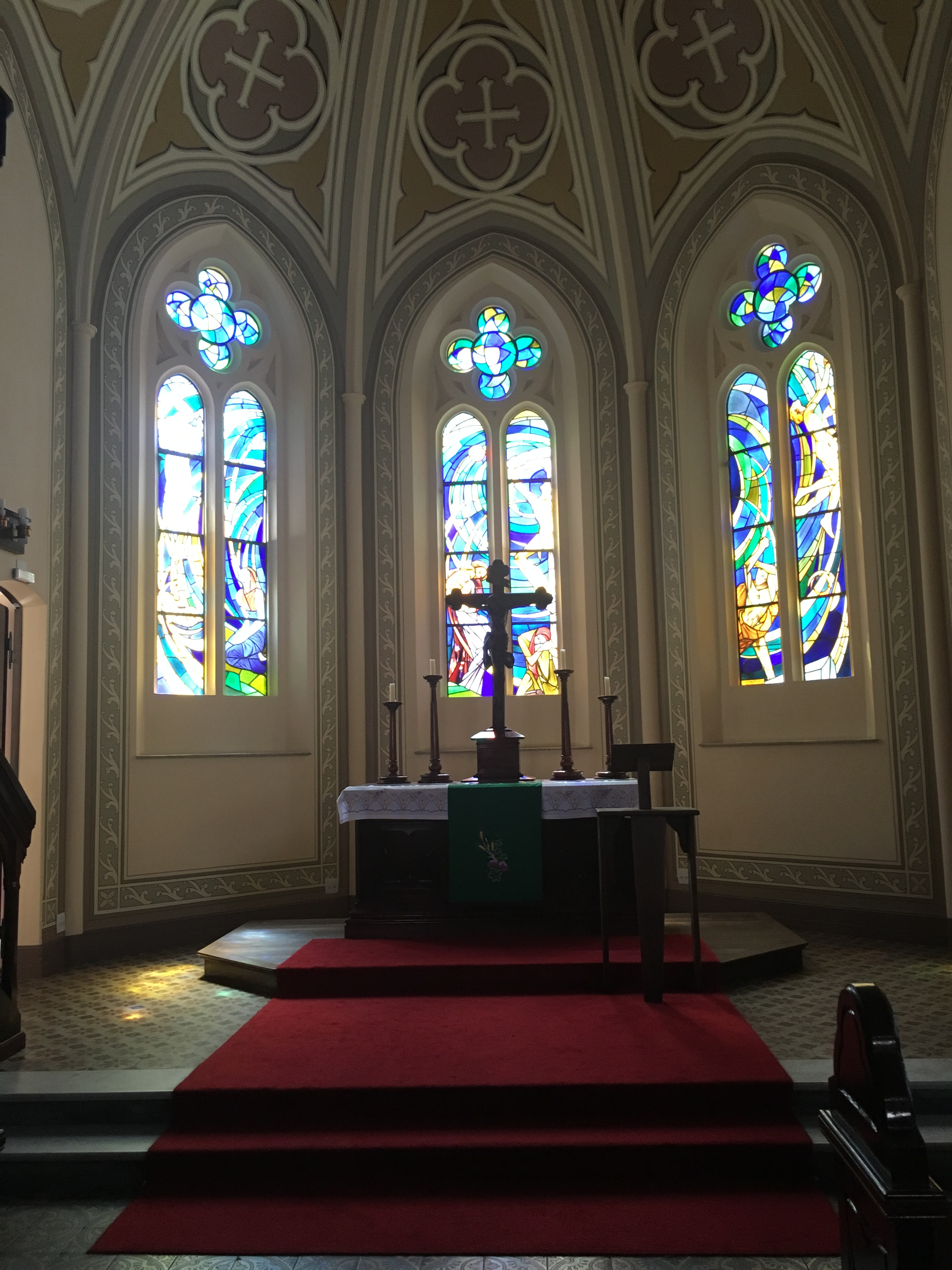
Altar of Igreja Martin Luther

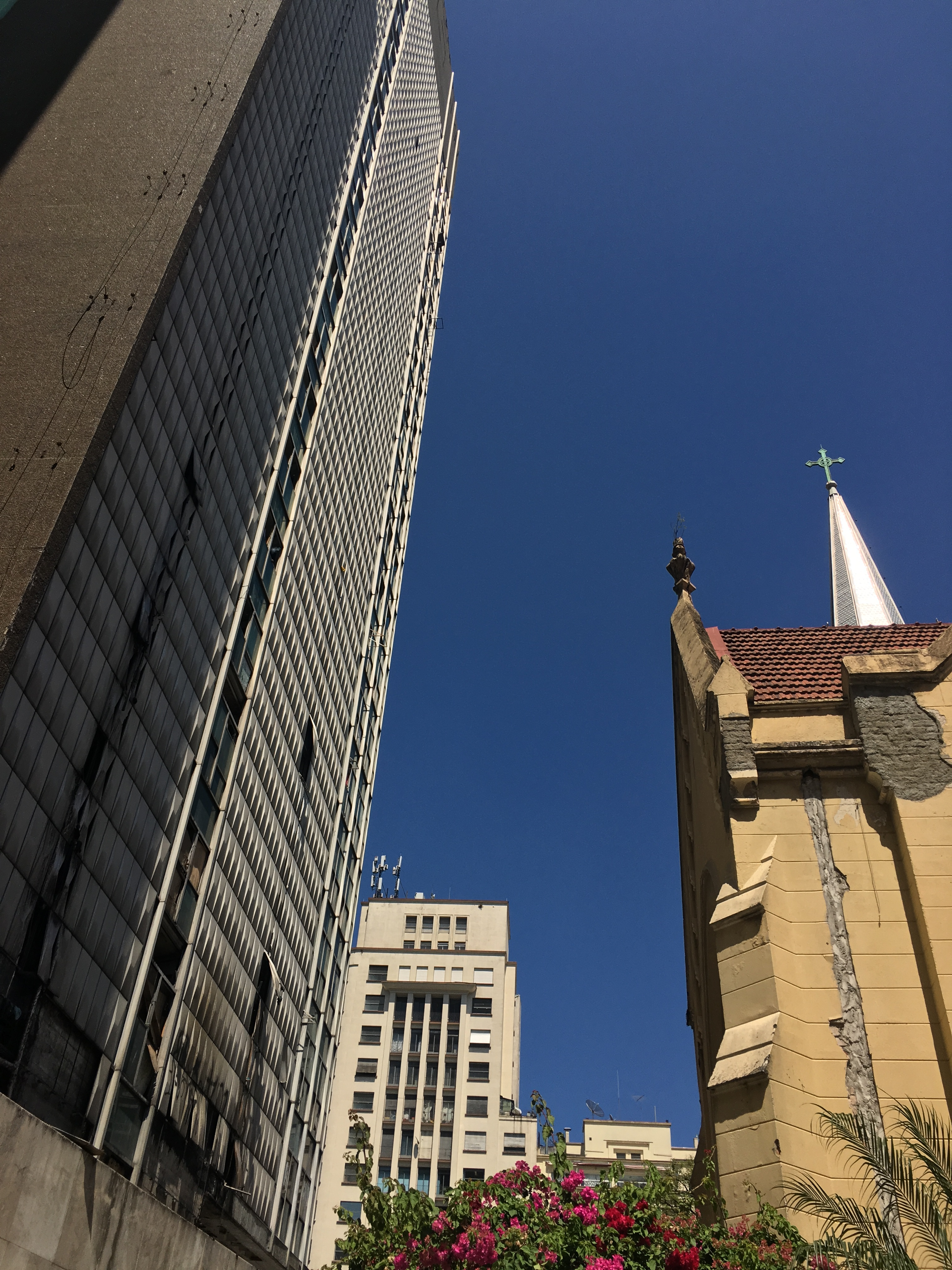
Martin Luther Church dividing space with building in the center of São Paulo

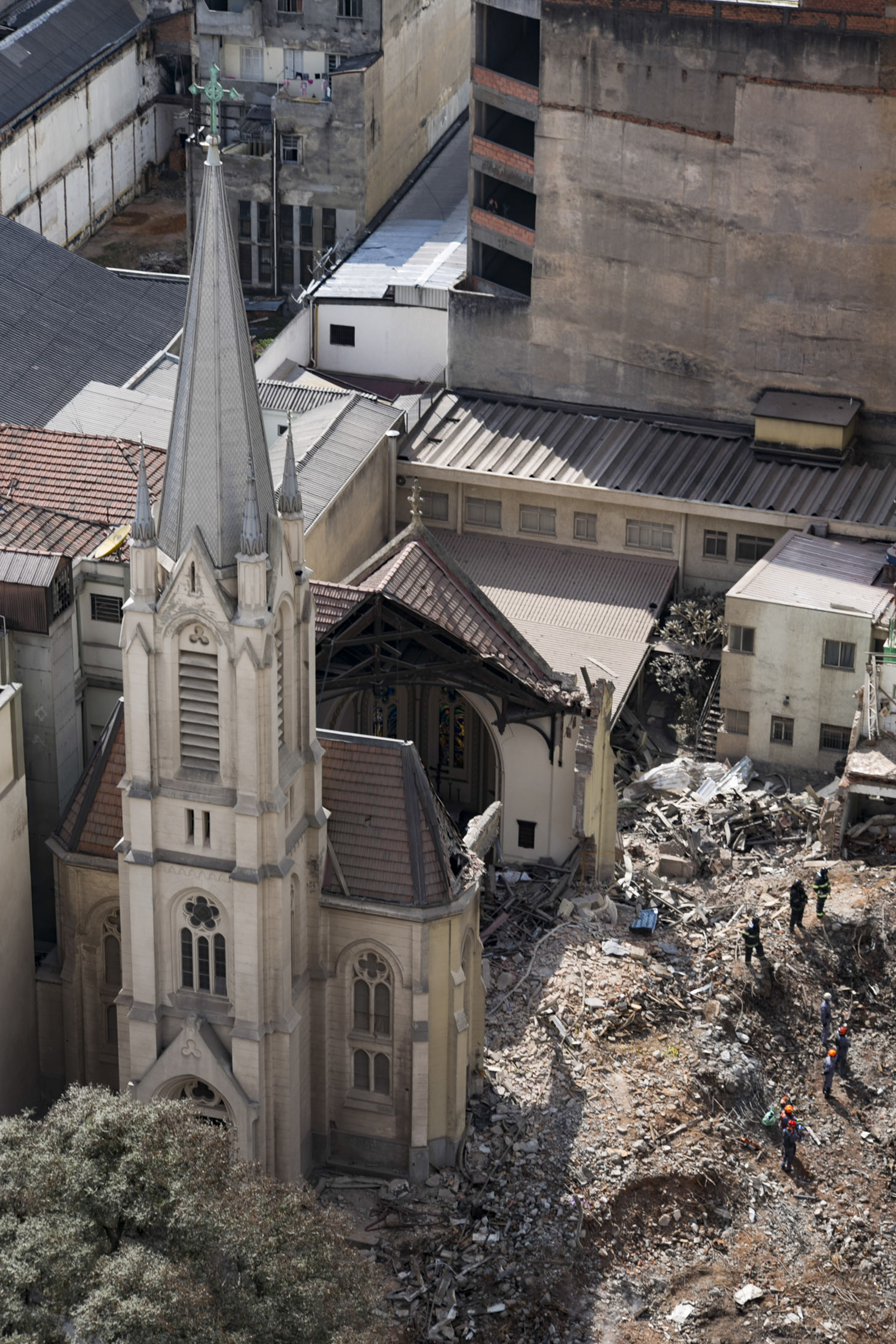
Evangelical Lutheran Church of São Paulo, which collapsed along with the Wilton Paes de Almeida building, at Largo do Paiçandu.
