= Edifício Wilton Paes de Almeida =

Former building in São Paulo

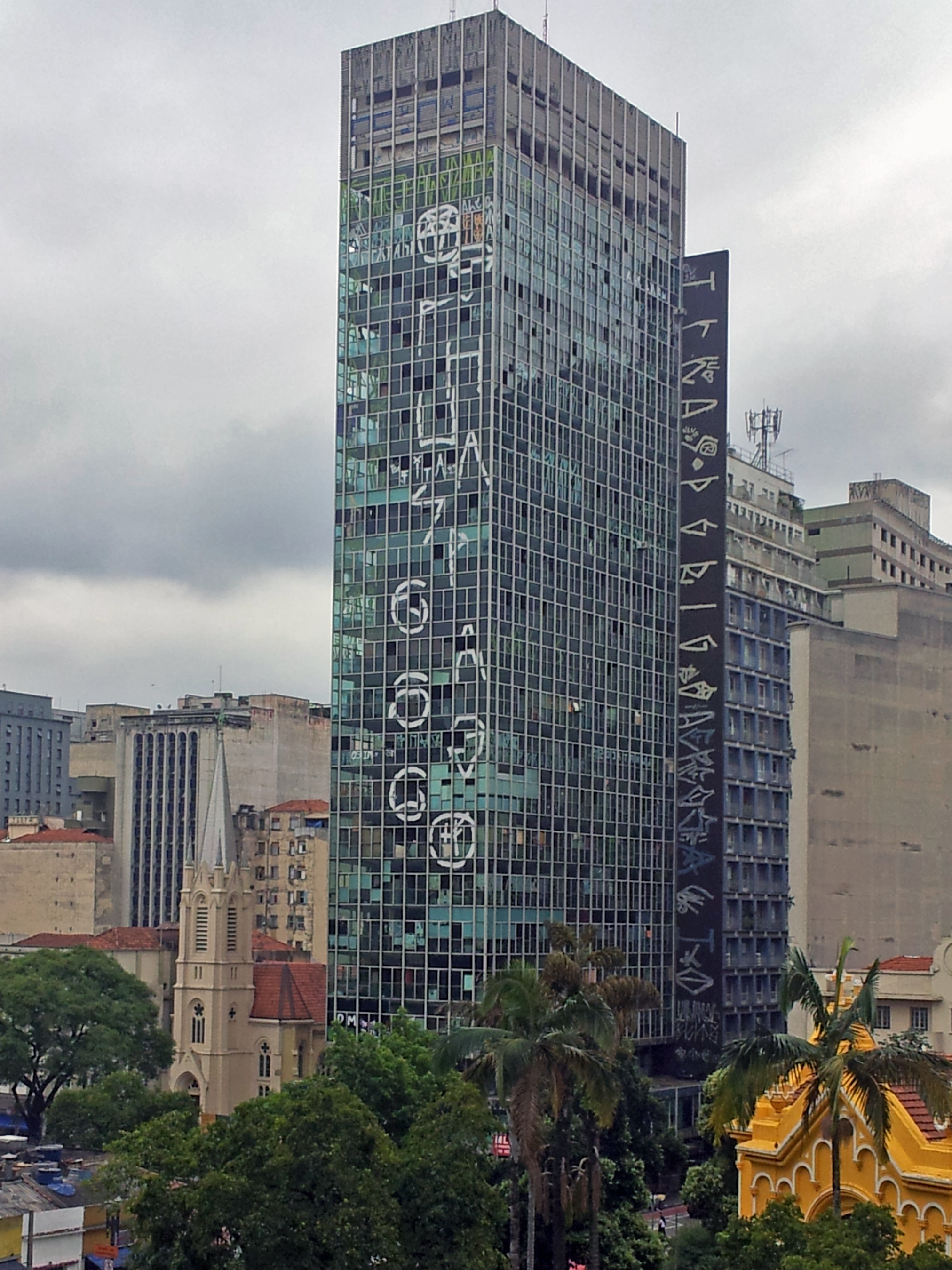
- The building in 2015

General information
- Status: Destroyed
- Location: 23 R. Antônio de Godói, Largo do Paissandú, Saõ Paulo
- Coordinates: 23°32′32″S 46°38′16″W
- Construction started: 1961
- Completed: 1968

Technical details
- Floor count: 24
- Edifício Wilton Paes de Almeida building collapse
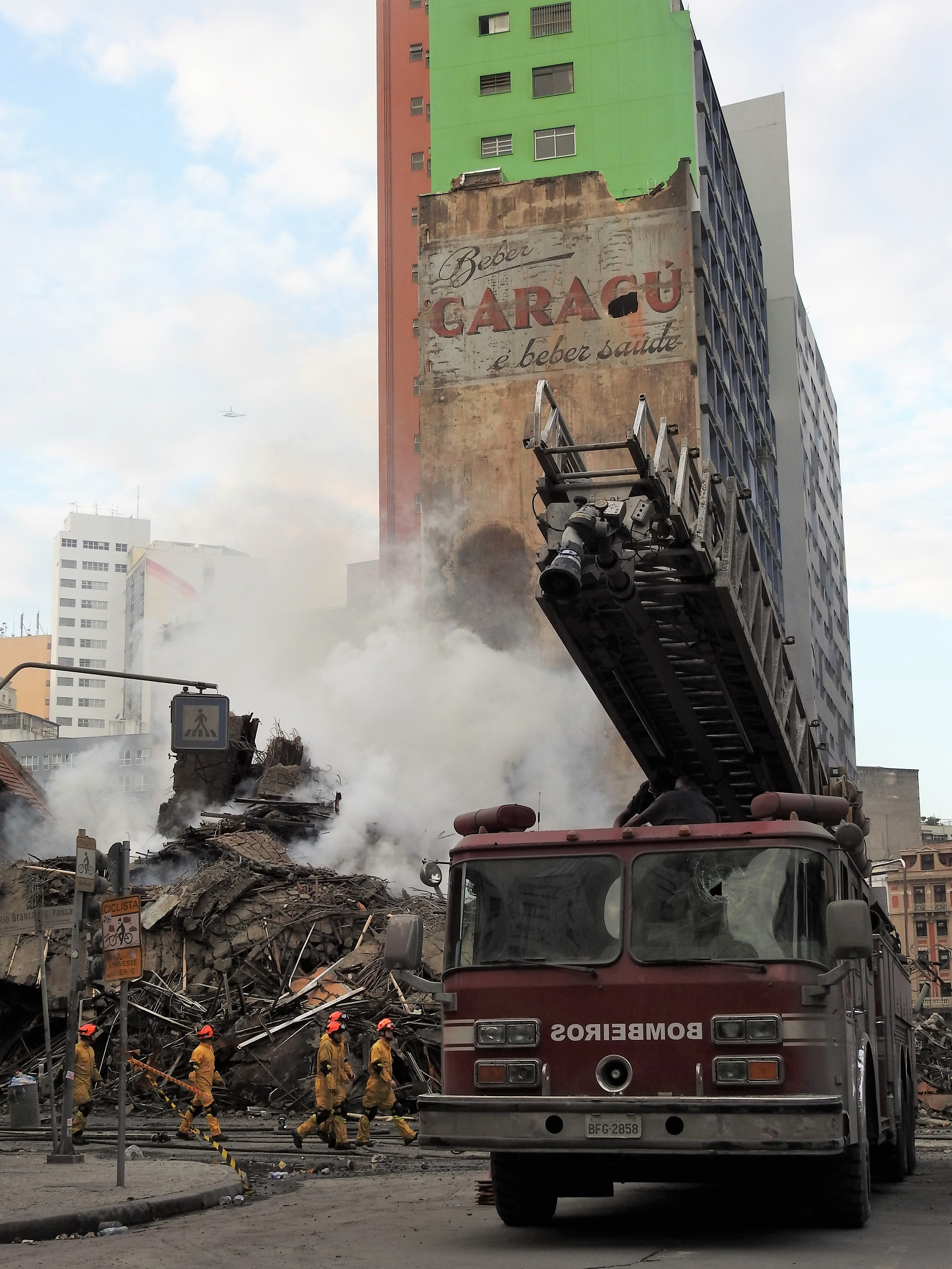
- The building collapsed on 1 May 2018
- Date: 1 May 2018
- Location: São Paulo, Brazil
- Deaths: 7; 2 missing

The Wilton Paes de Almeida Building (Portuguese: Edifício Wilton Paes de Almeida) was a high-rise building in Largo do Paissandú, São Paulo, Brazil, that was built during the 1960s to be the headquarters of Almeida de Paes, an importer of Belgian glass, featuring its products. Known after construction as "Skin of Glass" (Portuguese: Pele de Vidro), it was listed as a historic building in 1992. It was the headquarters of the Federal Police in São Paulo from the 1980s until 2003, after which it was occupied by squatters. It caught fire and collapsed on 1 May 2018, causing at least 7 fatalities.

== Building ==
The modernist building was designed by Roger Zmekhol. It was built between 1961 and 1968 by Morse & Bierrenbach. It occupied a plot of 650 m^{2} (7,000 sq ft), with around 12,000 m^{2} (130,000 sq ft) of internal space. The structure's columns were made of steel and steel-reinforced concrete, which supported cantilevered floor slabs of ribbed concrete. An aluminum-framed glass curtain wall wrapped the exterior of the building. It was located at 22 Rua Antonio de Godói in the República area of São Paulo, adjacent to the Evangelical Lutheran Church of São Paulo. It had 24 floors.

It was one of the first buildings in São Paulo with a glass façade, with air conditioning built in to keep the façade clear. It had a marble and stainless steel hall. The building was considered a property of historical, architectural and landscape interest, which guaranteed the preservation of its external characteristics. In 1992 it was listed by CONPRESP (Portuguese: Conselho Municipal de Preservação do Patrimônio Histórico, Cultural e Ambiental da Cidade de São Paulo, Municipal Council for the Preservation of Historic, Cultural and Environmental Heritage of the City of São Paulo).

The building was initially owned by businessman and politician Sebastião Paes de Almeida, and housed various companies. Debts meant that the building was taken over by the federal government. It housed the headquarters of the Federal Police in São Paulo between the 1980s and 2003, and was also the headquarters of INSS (Instituto Nacional do Seguro Social) before being abandoned and occupied by squatters. It was put up for sale in 2015 for around R$20 million.

== Fire and collapse ==
The fire started on the fifth floor of the building at around 4:20am GMT (1:20 a.m. local time) at the first hours of 2 May 2018 (late night of 1 May, May Day holiday), and collapsed about 90 minutes later. The cause of the fire was a short-circuit in a power strip connected to a microwave, TV and refrigerator. The fire spread to an adjacent building, which was not in danger of collapse. The central part of the adjacent Evangelical Lutheran Church of São Paulo was also destroyed during the collapse of the building.

At the time of the fire, 372 people (146 families) were occupying the building. Makeshift wooden living structures helped spread the fire throughout the building, with the empty shafts where lifts had formerly been acting like a chimney. Around 160 firefighters attended the scene. Seven people died, including one man who was being rescued using a steel rope when the building collapsed. The exact number of deaths and injuries are still unknown since the building was mostly occupied by homeless squatters. Initially, the fire was thought to have been caused by a gas explosion.

The first body was found on 4 May, with six people missing. As of 18 May, 2 residents of the building were still missing. Prior to collapse, the building had recently been surveyed, and no structural risk had been reported; this investigation was reopened after the collapse, along with a new inspection of 70 other buildings in São Paulo.

== Aftermath ==
The documentary film Skin of Glass explored the issue of homelessness in the context of the building's decline, and was directed by Roger Zmekhol's daughter, Denise.
