= Holy Trinity Church, Bad Berneck =

Lutheran church in Bad Berneck, Germany

Holy Trinity Lutheran Church
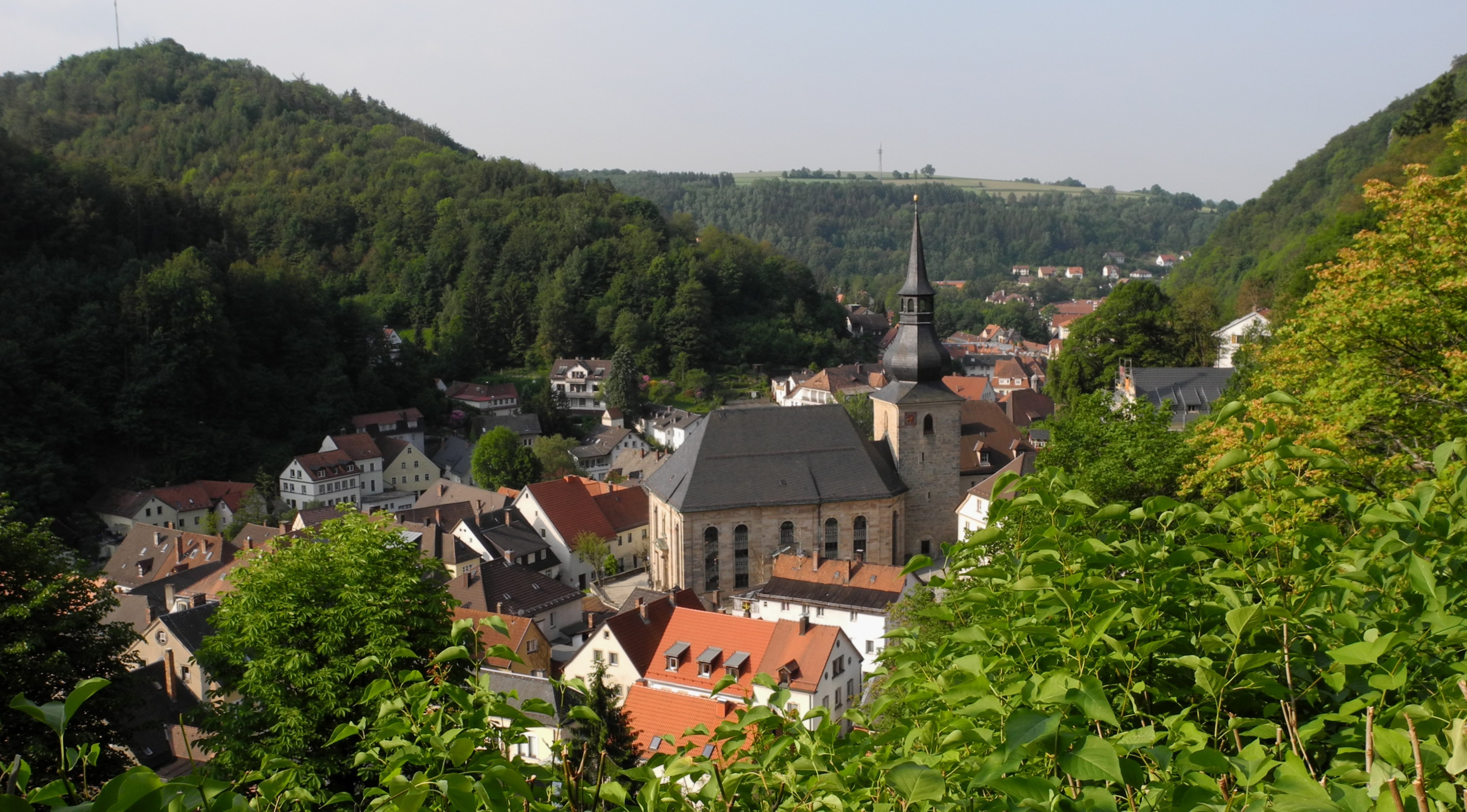

Religion
- Affiliation: Evangelical Lutheran Church in Bavaria

Location
- Location: Bad Berneck im Fichtelgebirge, Bavaria; Germany
- Interactive map of Holy Trinity Lutheran Church
- Coordinates: 50°02′57″N 11°40′27″E

Architecture
- Groundbreaking: 1800
- Completed: 1837

Holy Trinity Church (Dreifaltigkeitskirche) is a Lutheran church in Bad Berneck im Fichtelgebirge. It is part of the Evangelical Lutheran Church in Bavaria, a member church of the Evangelical Church in Germany.

== History ==
Holy Trinity Church was inaugurated in 1800. It was built in the classical style and stands on the site of an ancient Catholic church. The interior of the church was completed in 1837. The altar sandstone statues, which depict Moses and Luke the Evangelist, were sculpted by Elias Räntz. The altar and baptismal font were designed by Johann Nestler.

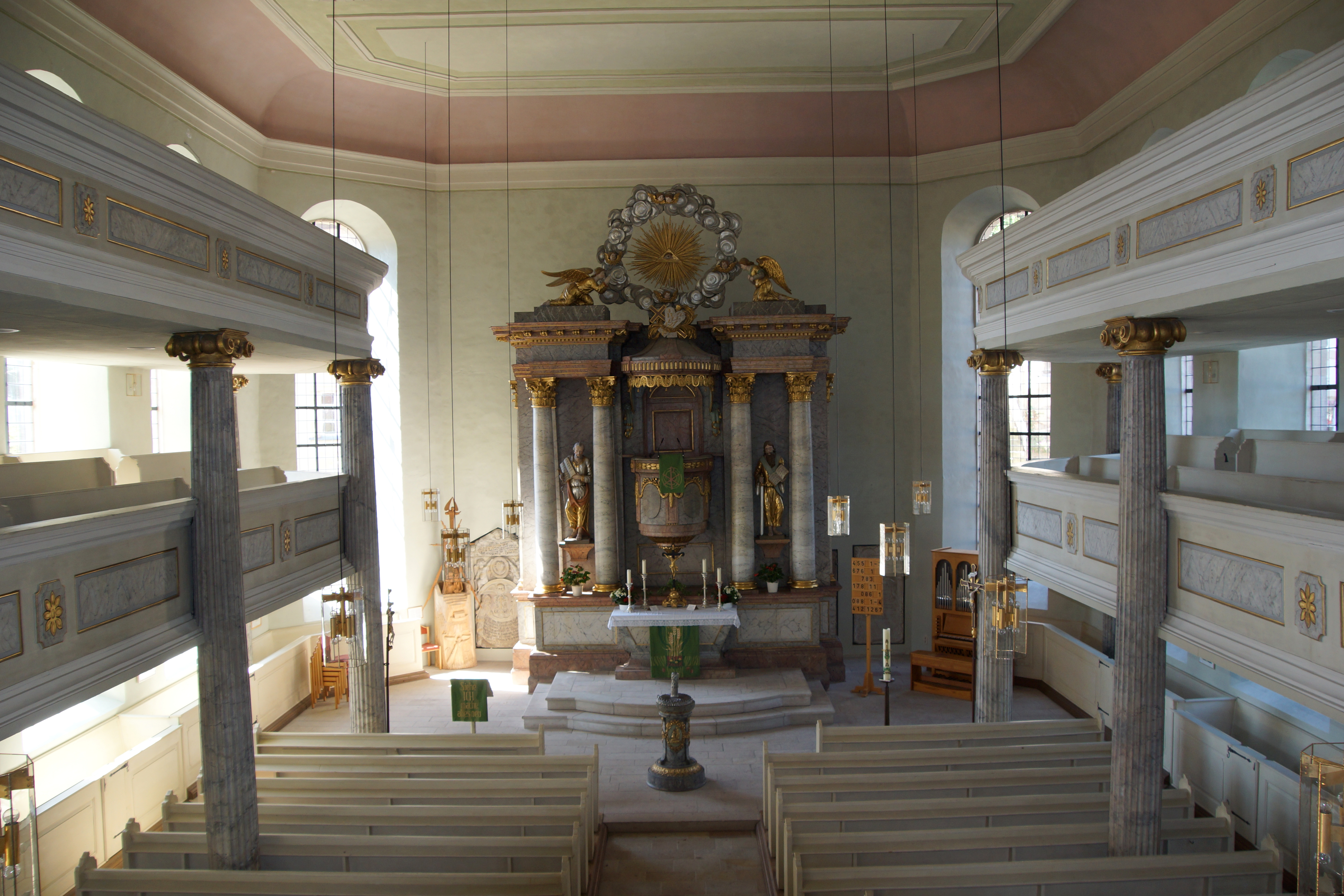
interior of the church
