= Alla Efimova =

American art historian

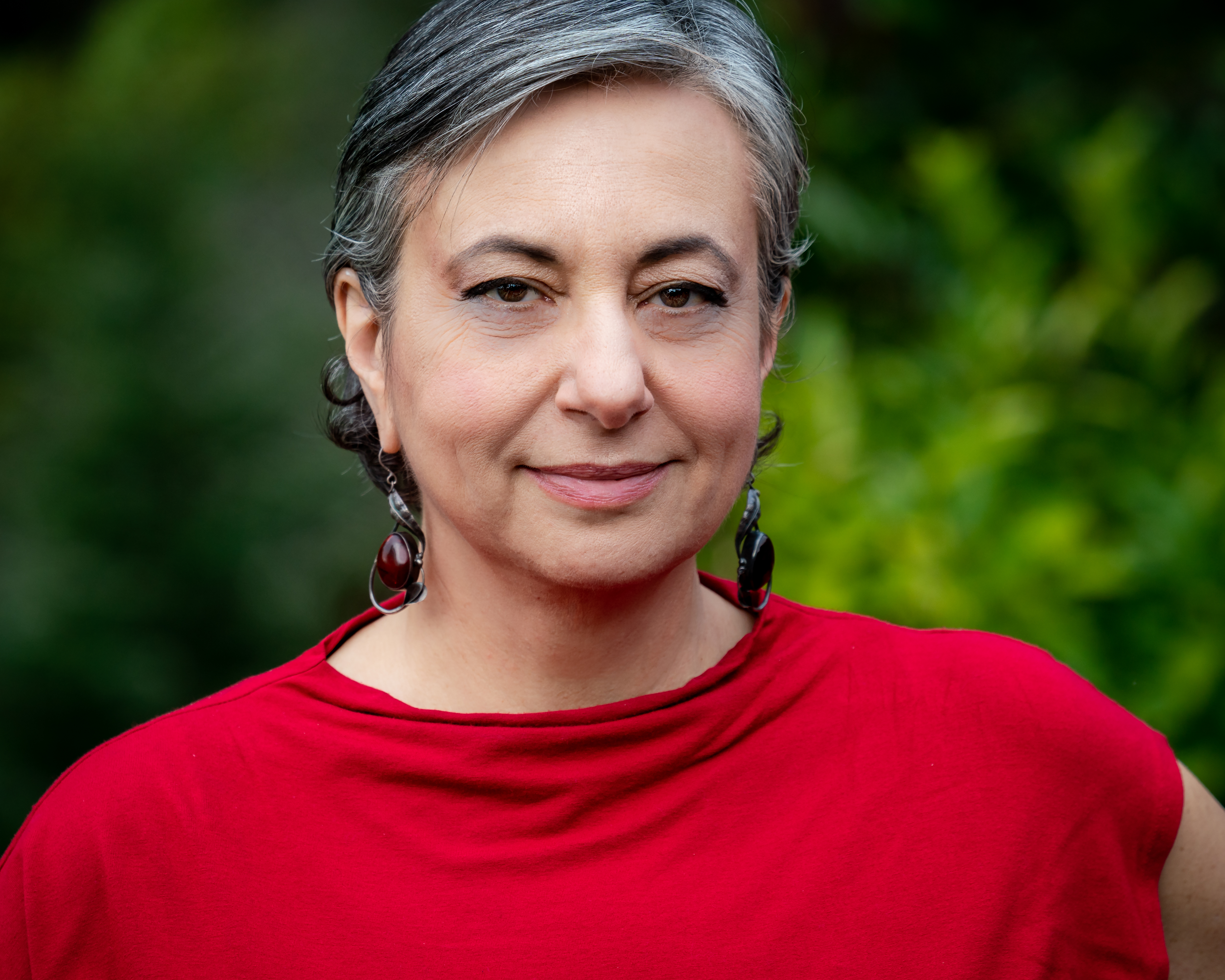

Alla Efimova is an art historian and curator who divides her time between New York City and Lisbon, Portugal.

Efimova was the Director of the Magnes Collection of Jewish Art and Life at the University of California Berkeley (2009–14) and a curator at the Berkeley Art Museum/Pacific Film Archive. She taught modern and contemporary art history at the University of California Santa Cruz and San Francisco Art Institute. In 2014, Efimova founded KunstWorks, an agency focused on legacy advancement for contemporary artists and artists' estates.

Efimova has served on the boards of the Woodman Artist Residency Foundation, the Carl Heidenreich Foundation, Wild Projects, the Center for Art and Religion at the Graduate Theological Union, Berkeley, the Council of American Jewish Museums, and as an advisor to the American Photography Archives Group (APAG).

== Education ==
Alla Efimova received her B.A. from New York University, and a Ph.D. in Visual and Cultural Studies from the University of Rochester.

== Exhibitions and publications ==
=== Selected exhibitions ===
- Carl Heidenreich and Hans Hofmann in Post-War New York. Berkeley Art Museum/Pacific Film Archive, 2004.
- Acting Out: Claude Cahun and Marcel Moore. With guest curator Tirza True Latimer. The Magnes, Berkeley, 2005. Presented at The Frye Art Museum, Seattle, WA.
- They Called Me Meyer July. The Magnes, Berkeley, 2007. Presented at The Jewish Museum (NY) and Jewish Historical Museum (Amsterdam).
- Through the Eyes of Rachel Marker: A Literary Installation by Moira Roth. The Magnes Collection, University of California Berkeley, 2013.

=== Exhibition catalogues ===
- Layers: Contemporary Collage from St. Petersburg, Russia. Center for Art, Design, and Visual Culture, UMBC, 1996.
- Surviving Suprematism: Lazar Khidekel. The Magnes, Berkeley, 2005.

=== Selected books ===
- Textura: Russian Essays on Visual Culture. Alla Efimova and Lev Manovich, eds. The University of Chicago Press, 1993.
- The Jewish Worlds: 100 Treasures of Art and Culture from The Magnes Collection. Alla Efimova and Francesco Spagnolo. Skira Rizzoli, 2014.
- Thought Experiments: The Art of Jonathon Keats. Alla Efimova and Julie Decker, eds. Hirmer Publishers, 2021.
- Kim Anno: Rebel Splendor. Alla Efimova, ed. Anglim/Trimble, 2023.

=== Articles ===
- "On Sleep and Oblivion in Post-Soviet Film." In The Imprints of Terror : The Rhetoric of Violence and the Violence of Rhetoric in Modern Russian Culture, ed. Anna Brodsky, et al. (Wien: Sagner, 2006).
- "The Gifts," Brill (January 2007)
- "To Touch on the Raw: The Aesthetic Affections of Socialist Realism," Art Journal (May 2014)
- "On the Art of Jonathon Keats," Zyzzyva (April 2021)
