= Adolf Köberle =

German theologian (1898–1990)

Adolf Köberle (July 3, 1898 – March 22, 1990) was a German theologian. From 1922 to 1926, he was head of the Evangelical Lutheran Mission Seminary in Leipzig. From 1930 to 1939, he was Professor of Systematic Theology in Basel. He is best known for his work, The Quest for Holiness: A Biblical, Historical, and Systematic Investigation.

Köberle studied philosophy and theology at University of Tübingen. In 1928, he received his doctorate with the writing of Das Verhältnis von Rechtfertigung und Heiligung in seiner Bedeutung für den christlichen Glauben. Eine biblische, theologiegeschichtliche und systematische Untersuchung. The book was published later under the title Rechtfertigung und Heiligung, and translated to English in 1936 by John C. Mattes under the title The Quest for Holiness: A Biblical, Historical and Systematic Investigation. The "brilliant theological study... attracted so much attention in Germany that within a few years it passed through three editions..."

Köberle primarily wrote about Christian holiness as being motivated by the love of Christ and gratitude to God (rather than being motivated by obligation or fear). He was considered a representative and interpreter of the heritage of Lutheran Pietism.

== Notable quotations ==
- "...The personal and voluntary relationship between God and man that is taught in the Bible has been utterly betrayed and forgotten."
- "The legalistic Pharisee, who had imagined that he could purely and completely fulfill God's will with his own natural powers, lays aside the proud legal name he bore. The alpine heights of human piety and virtue become very small in his eyes as he views Him Who dwelleth in the heavens. The relative difference existing on earth, from which the vanity and self-consciousness of man draws its support, are all levelled (Rom. 1-3)."
