= Gumniska =

Gumniska may refer to the following places in Poland:

- Gumniska, a district of Tarnów
- Gumniska, Subcarpathian Voivodeship (south-east Poland)
- Gumniska, Warmian-Masurian Voivodeship (north-east Poland)
