= Skoczewo =

- Village
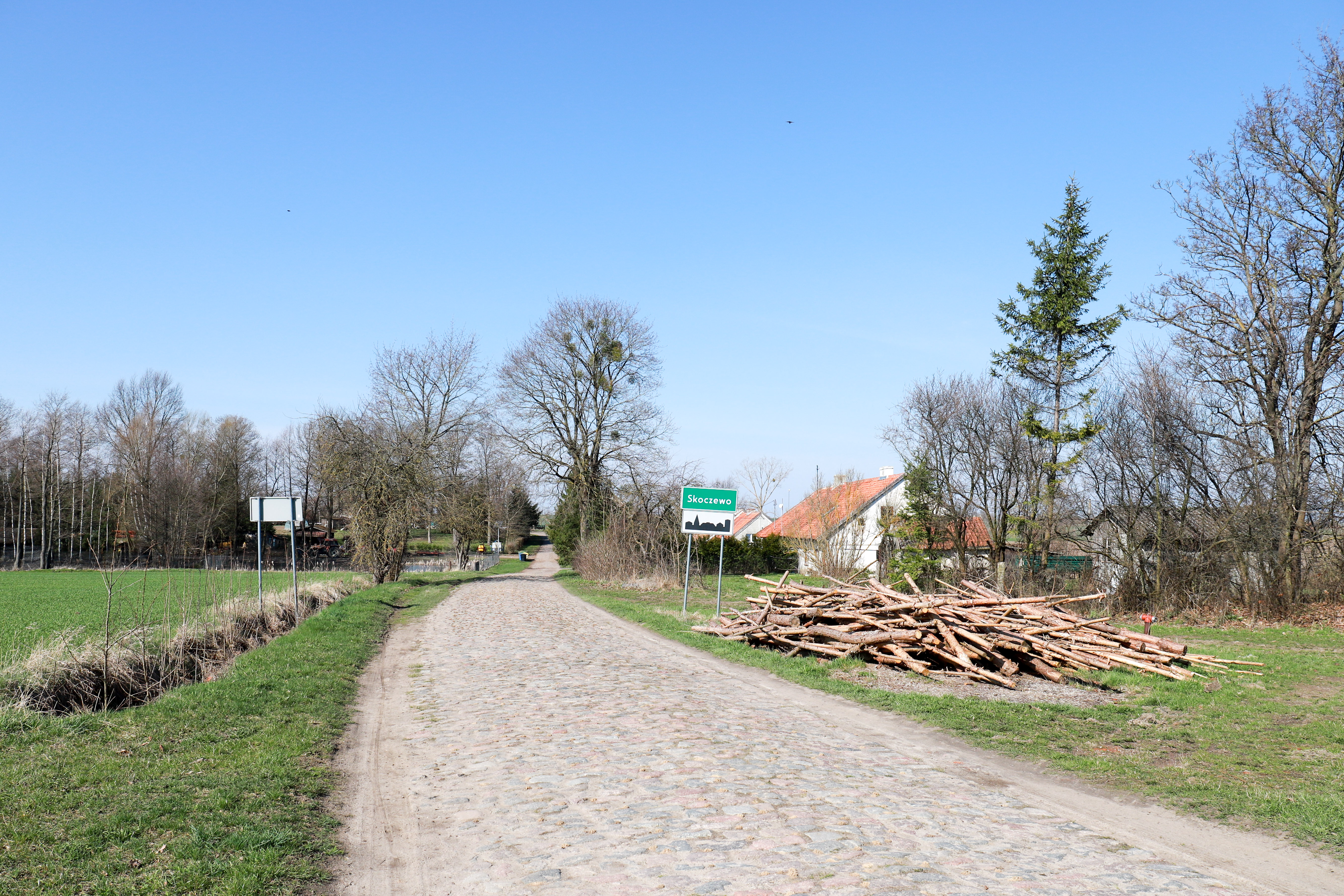

- Location within Poland
- Coordinates: 54°11′22″N 21°21′40″E
- Country: Poland
- Voivodeship: Warmian-Masurian
- County: Kętrzyn
- Gmina: Barciany

Skoczewo [skɔˈt͡ʂɛvɔ] is a village in the administrative district of Gmina Barciany, within Kętrzyn County, Warmian-Masurian Voivodeship, in northern Poland, close to the border with the Kaliningrad Oblast of Russia.
