= Momajny =

- Village
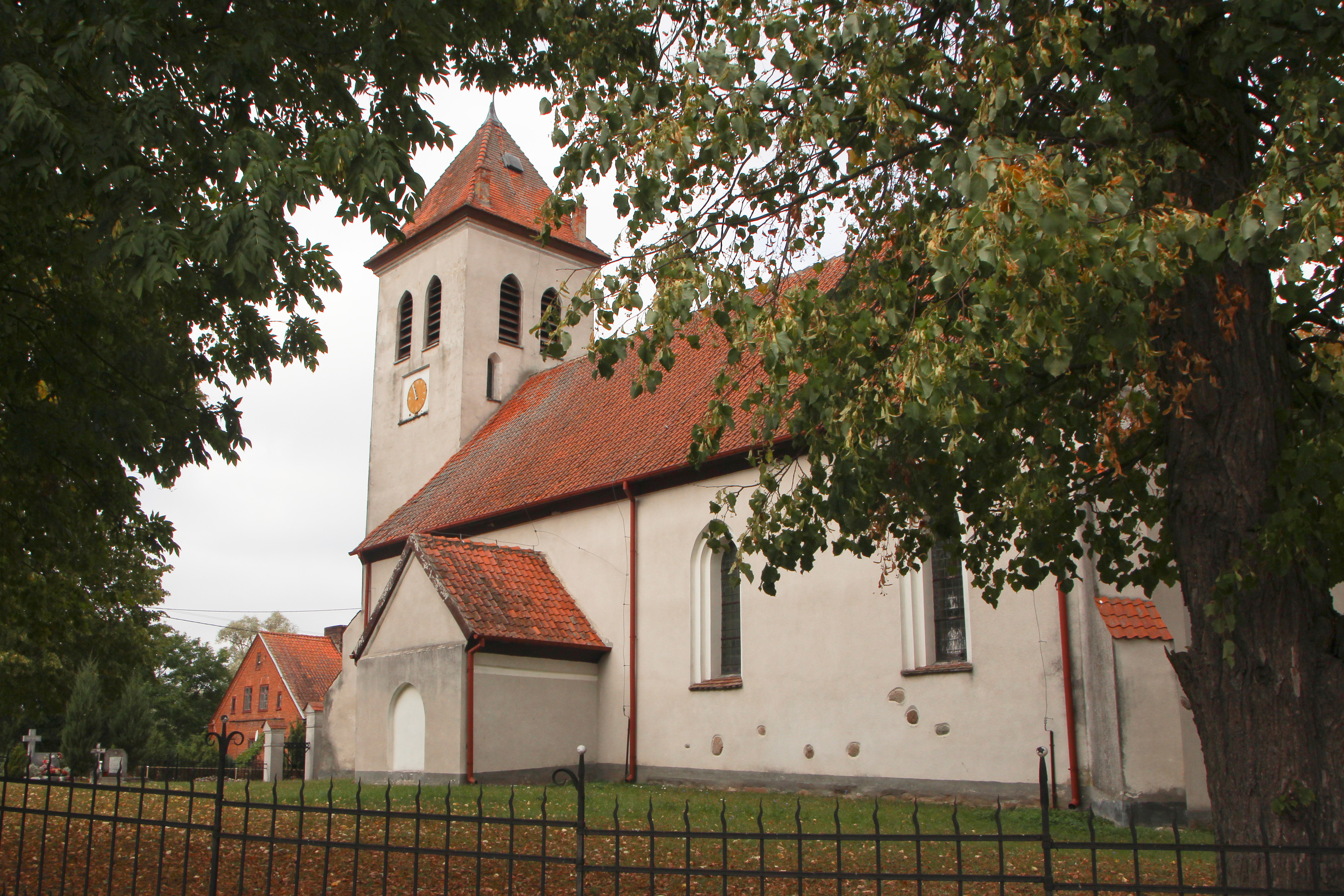
- Church

- Location within Poland
- Coordinates: 54°18′45″N 21°18′12″E
- Country: Poland
- Voivodeship: Warmian-Masurian
- County: Kętrzyn
- Gmina: Barciany

Momajny [mɔˈmai̯nɨ] (German Momehnen) is a village in the administrative district of Gmina Barciany, within Kętrzyn County, Warmian-Masurian Voivodeship, in northern Poland, close to the border with the Kaliningrad Oblast of Russia.
