= Markuzy =

- Village
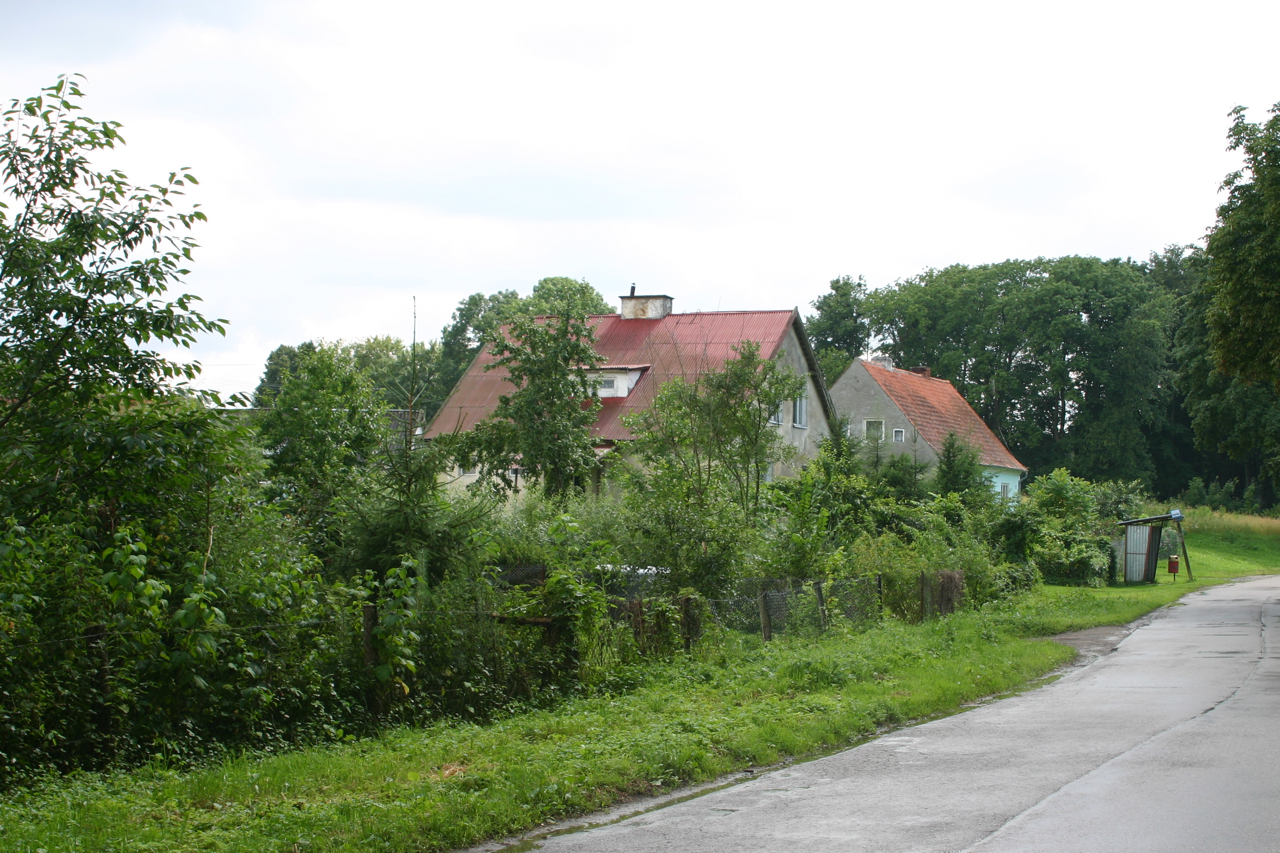
- Street of Markuzy

- Location within Poland
- Coordinates: 54°15′00″N 21°21′21″E
- Country: Poland
- Voivodeship: Warmian-Masurian
- County: Kętrzyn
- Gmina: Barciany

Markuzy [marˈkuzɨ] is a village in the administrative district of Gmina Barciany, within Kętrzyn County, Warmian-Masurian Voivodeship, in northern Poland, close to the border with the Kaliningrad Oblast of Russia.
