= Solkieniki =

- Village
- Location within Poland
- Coordinates: 54°17′10″N 21°13′1″E
- Country: Poland
- Voivodeship: Warmian-Masurian
- County: Kętrzyn
- Gmina: Barciany

Solkieniki [sɔlkʲɛˈniki] is a village in the administrative district of Gmina Barciany, within Kętrzyn County, Warmian-Masurian Voivodeship, in northern Poland, close to the border with the Kaliningrad Oblast of Russia.
