= Niedziałki, Warmian-Masurian Voivodeship =

Niedziałki
- Settlement
- Location within Poland
- Coordinates: 54°10′42″N 21°26′00″E
- Country: Poland
- Voivodeship: Warmian-Masurian
- County: Kętrzyn
- Gmina: Barciany

Niedziałki [ɲɛˈd͡ʑau̯ki] (German Fünfhuben) is a settlement in the administrative district of Gmina Barciany, within Kętrzyn County, Warmian-Masurian Voivodeship, in northern Poland, close to the border with the Kaliningrad Oblast of Russia.
