= Suchawa, Warmian-Masurian Voivodeship =

Suchawa
- Village
- Location within Poland
- Coordinates: 54°15′4″N 21°24′5″E
- Country: Poland
- Voivodeship: Warmian-Masurian
- County: Kętrzyn
- Gmina: Barciany
- Population: 162

Suchawa [suˈxava] is a village in the administrative district of Gmina Barciany, within Kętrzyn County, Warmian-Masurian Voivodeship, in northern Poland, close to the border with the Kaliningrad Oblast of Russia.

== History ==
At the end of the 19th century, a manor house was constructed in the village by Max Siegfried, a member of the Siegfried family, who were prominent landowners in the region and owned several estates in the area. The original design featured a two-story central projection on the front façade, topped with a decorative pediment. After World War II, the building was repurposed to serve as apartments and a community hall. It later suffered a fire that caused significant damage, but the structure was subsequently rebuilt. Today, the manor functions as a privately owned residence.
