= Pastwiska, Warmian-Masurian Voivodeship =

Pastwiska
- Settlement
- Location within Poland
- Coordinates: 54°12′44″N 21°23′22″E
- Country: Poland
- Voivodeship: Warmian-Masurian
- County: Kętrzyn
- Gmina: Barciany

Pastwiska [pastˈfʲiska] is a settlement in the administrative district of Gmina Barciany, within Kętrzyn County, Warmian-Masurian Voivodeship, in northern Poland, close to the border with the Kaliningrad Oblast of Russia.
