= Dębiany, Kętrzyn County =

Dębiany
- Village
- Location within Poland
- Coordinates: 54°11′N 21°23′E
- Country: Poland
- Voivodeship: Warmian-Masurian
- County: Kętrzyn
- Gmina: Barciany
- Population: 80

Dębiany [dɛmˈbjanɨ] is a village in the administrative district of Gmina Barciany, within Kętrzyn County, Warmian-Masurian Voivodeship, in northern Poland, close to the border with the Kaliningrad Oblast of Russia.
