= Święty Kamień, Kętrzyn County =

Village in Poland

Święty Kamień
- Village
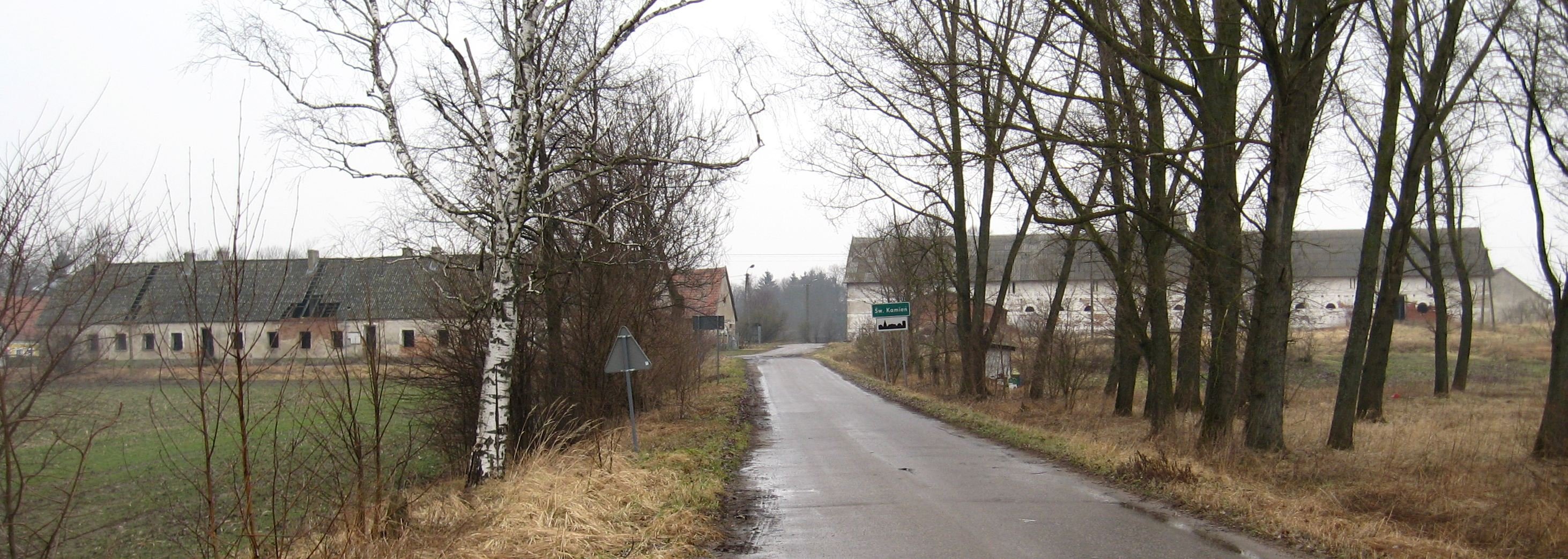

- Location within Poland
- Coordinates: 54°18′50″N 21°24′31″E
- Country: Poland
- Voivodeship: Warmian-Masurian
- County: Kętrzyn
- Gmina: Barciany

Święty Kamień (Polish pronunciation: [ˈɕfjɛntɨ ˈkamjɛj̃]) is a village in the administrative district of Gmina Barciany, within Kętrzyn County, Warmian-Masurian Voivodeship, in northern Poland, close to the border with the Kaliningrad Oblast of Russia.
