= Gęsiniec Wielki =

- Settlement
- Location within Poland
- Coordinates: 54°13′54″N 21°21′11″E
- Country: Poland
- Voivodeship: Warmian-Masurian
- County: Kętrzyn
- Gmina: Barciany

Gęsiniec Wielki (Polish pronunciation: [ɡɛ̃ˈɕiɲɛts ˈfjɛlkʲi]) is a settlement in the administrative district of Gmina Barciany, within Kętrzyn County, Warmian-Masurian Voivodeship, in northern Poland, close to the border with the Kaliningrad Oblast of Russia.

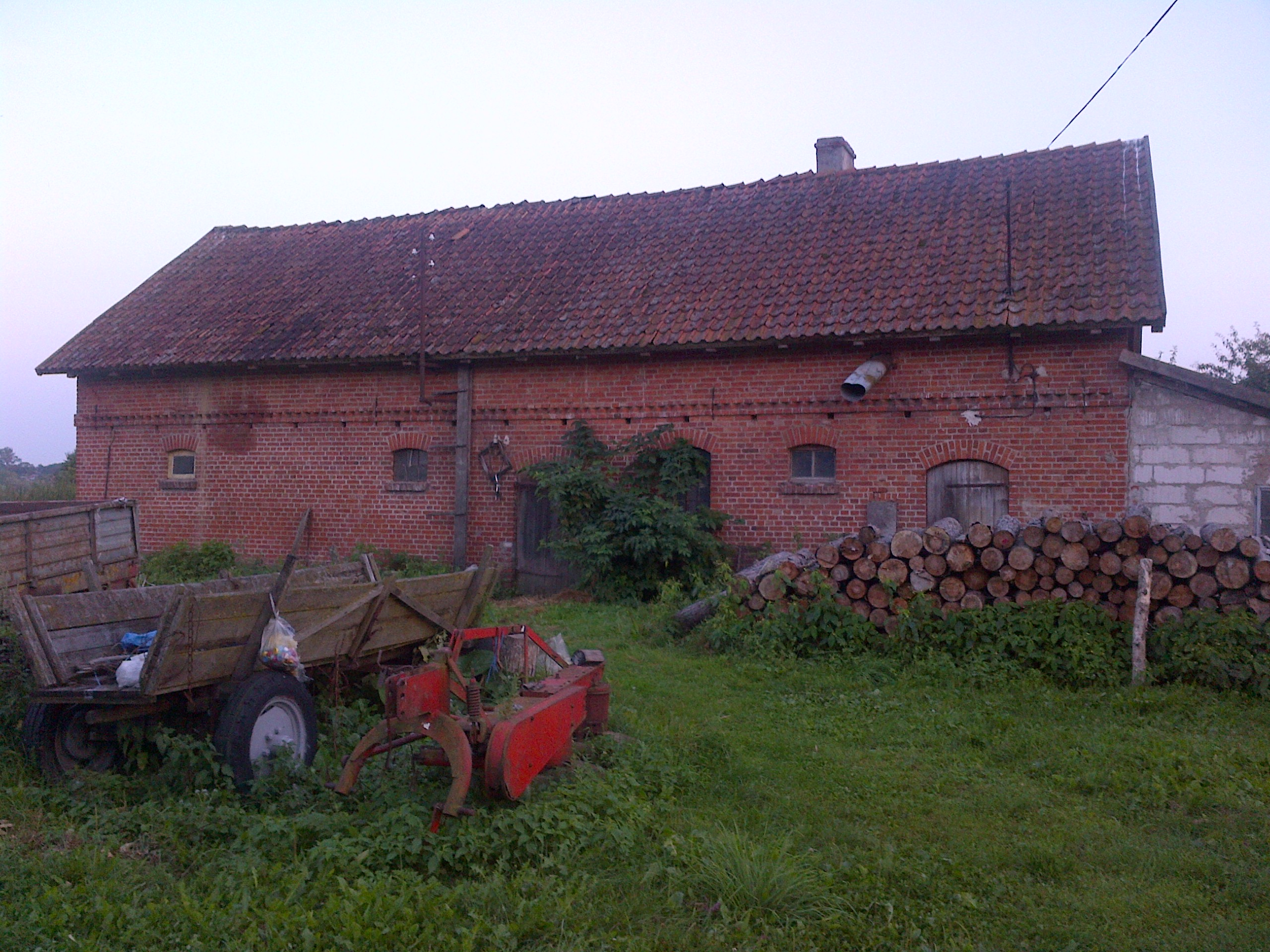
An old Prussian barn.
