= Gradowo, Warmian-Masurian Voivodeship =

Gradowo
- Village
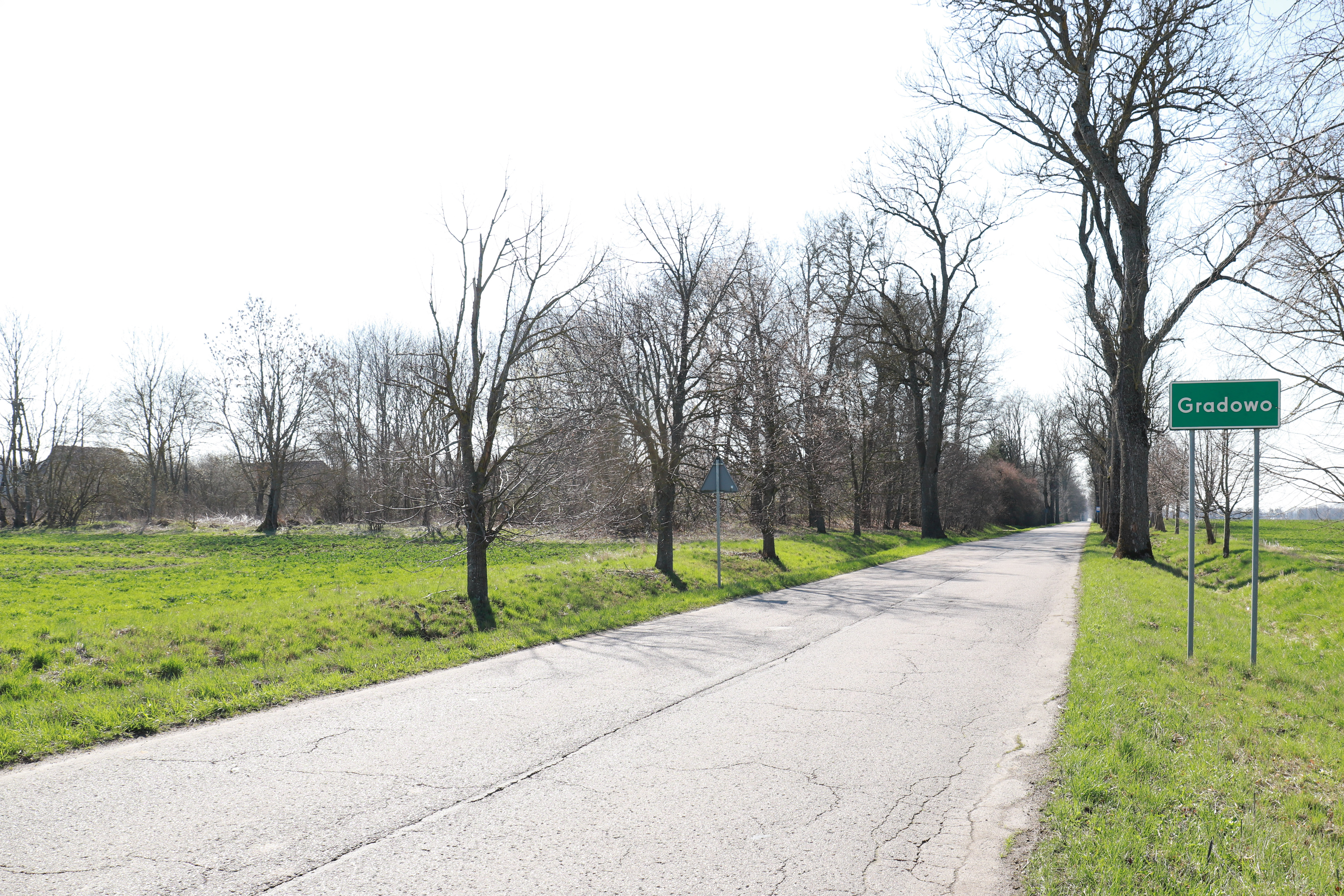

- Location within Poland
- Coordinates: 54°15′29″N 21°18′54″E
- Country: Poland
- Voivodeship: Warmian-Masurian
- County: Kętrzyn
- Gmina: Barciany

Gradowo [ɡraˈdɔvɔ] is a village in the administrative district of Gmina Barciany, within Kętrzyn County, Warmian-Masurian Voivodeship, in northern Poland, close to the border with the Kaliningrad Oblast of Russia. Between 1975–1998, the village administratively belonged to Olsztyn Province.

Voivoidship Road 591 (DW591) runs through the village.
