= Silginy =

- Village
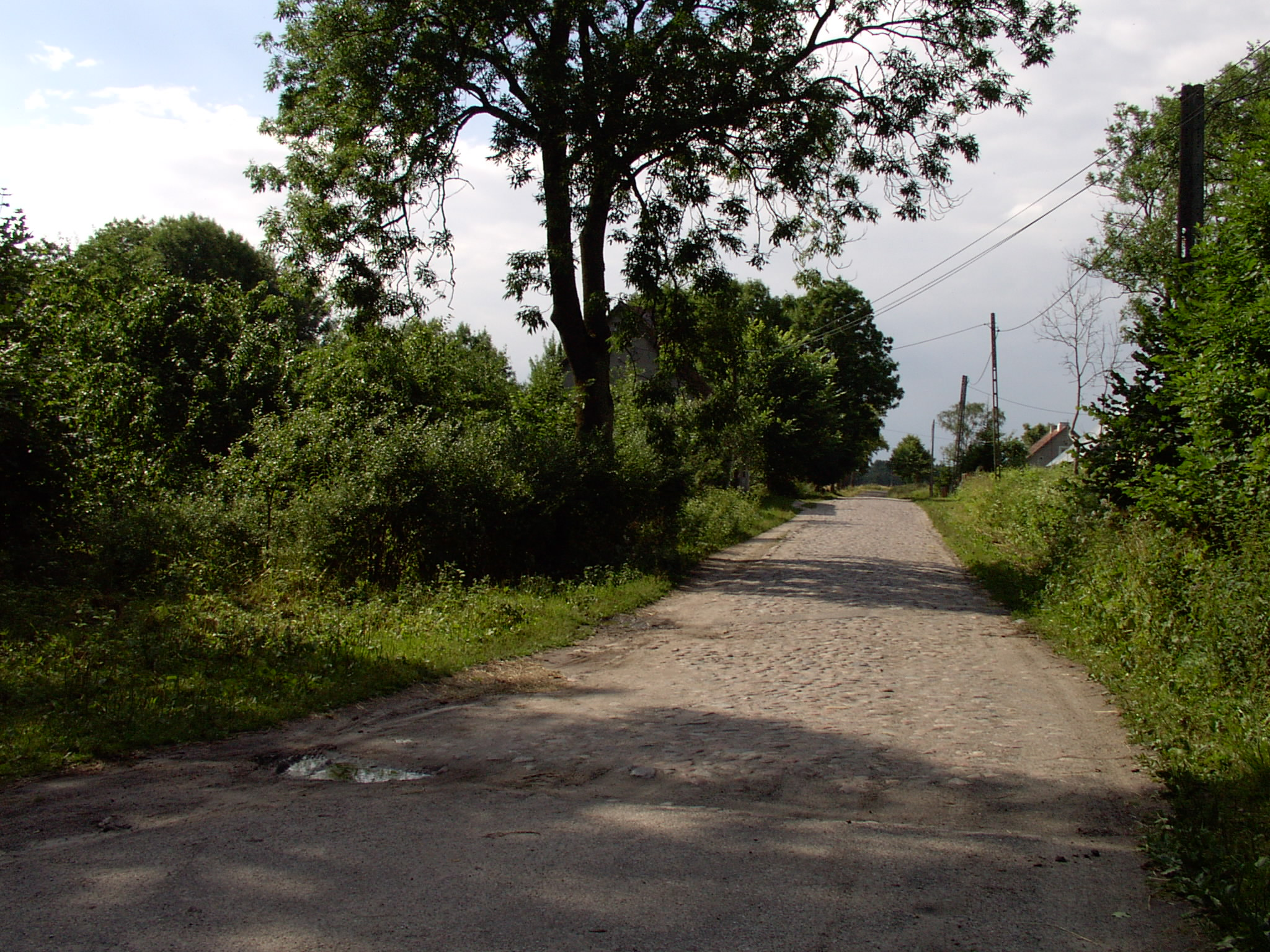

- Location within Poland
- Coordinates: 54°15′37″N 21°12′22″E
- Country: Poland
- Voivodeship: Warmian-Masurian
- County: Kętrzyn
- Gmina: Barciany
- Population: 140

Silginy [ɕilˈɡinɨ] is a village in the administrative district of Gmina Barciany, within Kętrzyn County, Warmian-Masurian Voivodeship, in northern Poland, close to the border with the Kaliningrad Oblast of Russia.
