= Radoski Dwór =

- Settlement
- Location within Poland
- Coordinates: 54°12′39″N 21°19′38″E
- Country: Poland
- Voivodeship: Warmian-Masurian
- County: Kętrzyn
- Gmina: Barciany

Radoski Dwór [raˈdɔski ˈdvur] is a settlement in the administrative district of Gmina Barciany, within Kętrzyn County, Warmian-Masurian Voivodeship, in northern Poland, close to the border with the Kaliningrad Oblast of Russia.
