= Błędowo, Warmian-Masurian Voivodeship =

Błędowo
- Village
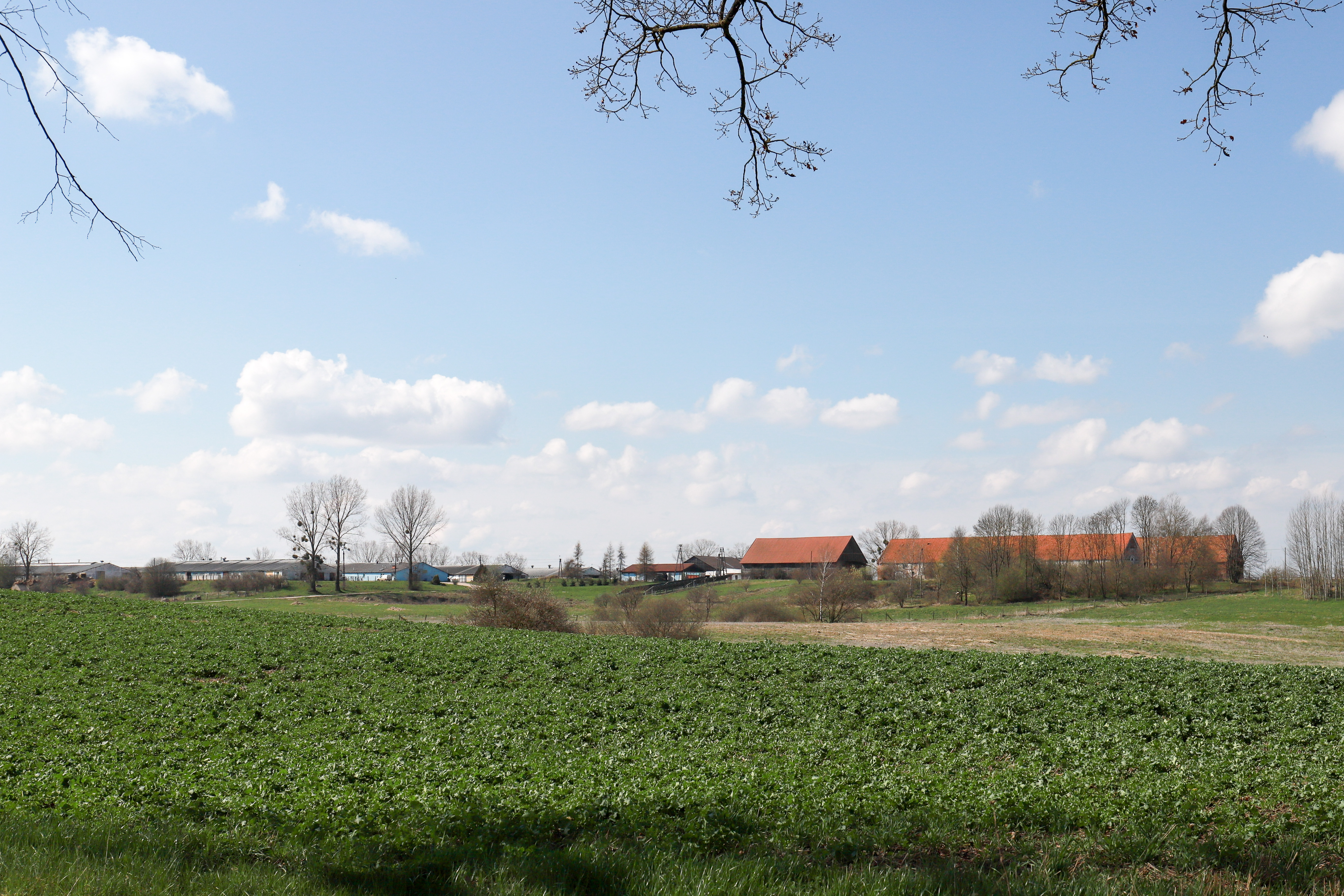

- Location within Poland
- Coordinates: 54°16′49″N 21°19′41″E
- Country: Poland
- Voivodeship: Warmian-Masurian
- County: Kętrzyn
- Gmina: Barciany

Błędowo [bwɛnˈdɔvɔ] is a village in the administrative district of Gmina Barciany, within Kętrzyn County, Warmian-Masurian Voivodeship, in northern Poland, close to the border with the Kaliningrad Oblast of Russia.
