= Michałkowo, Warmian-Masurian Voivodeship =

Michałkowo
- Village
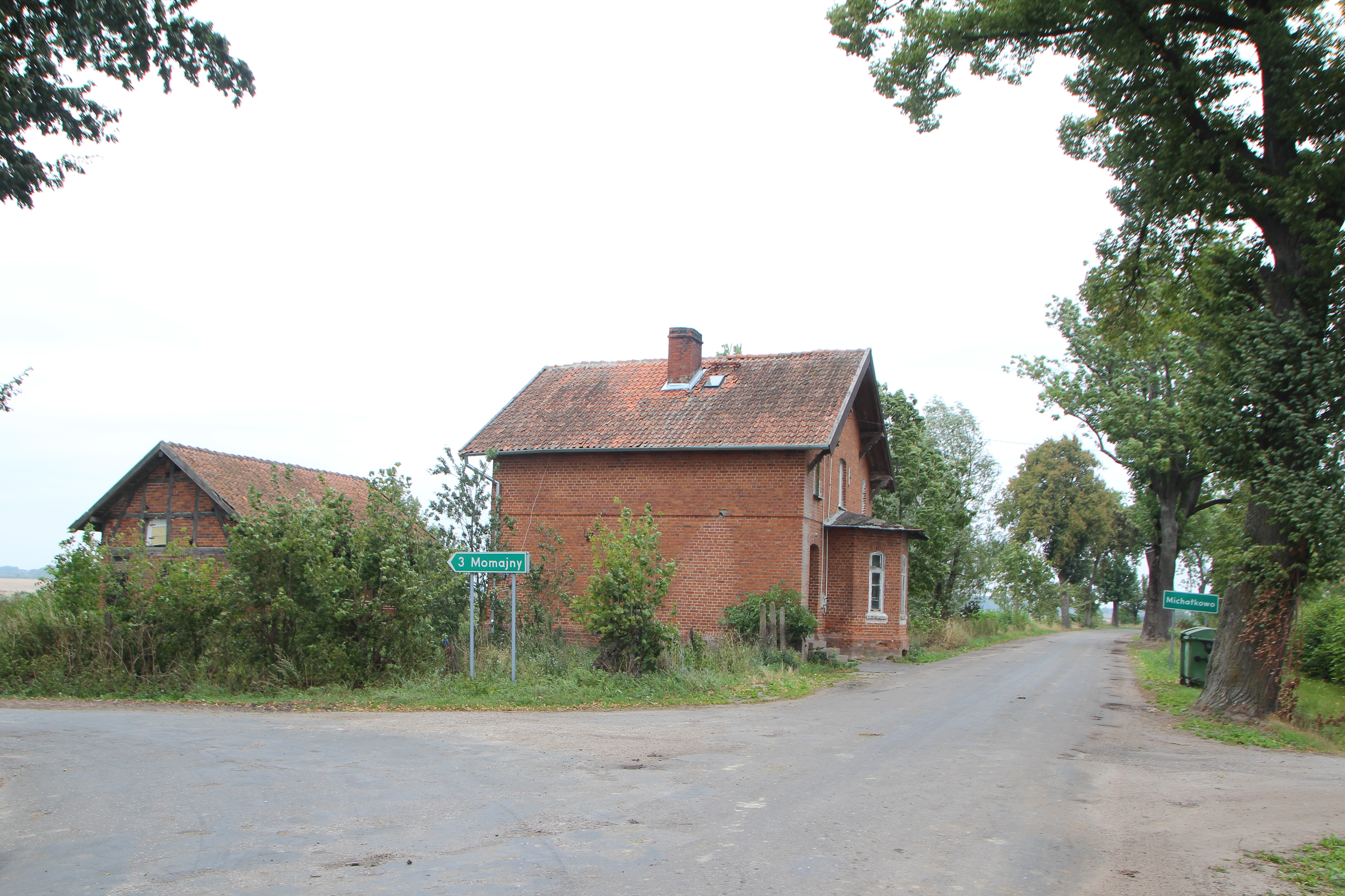

- Location within Poland
- Coordinates: 54°19′17″N 21°17′48″E
- Country: Poland
- Voivodeship: Warmian-Masurian
- County: Kętrzyn
- Gmina: Barciany

Michałkowo [mixau̯ˈkɔvɔ] is a village in the administrative district of Gmina Barciany, within Kętrzyn County, Warmian-Masurian Voivodeship, in northern Poland, close to the border with the Kaliningrad Oblast of Russia.
