= Niedziały, Gmina Barciany =

Niedziały
- Village
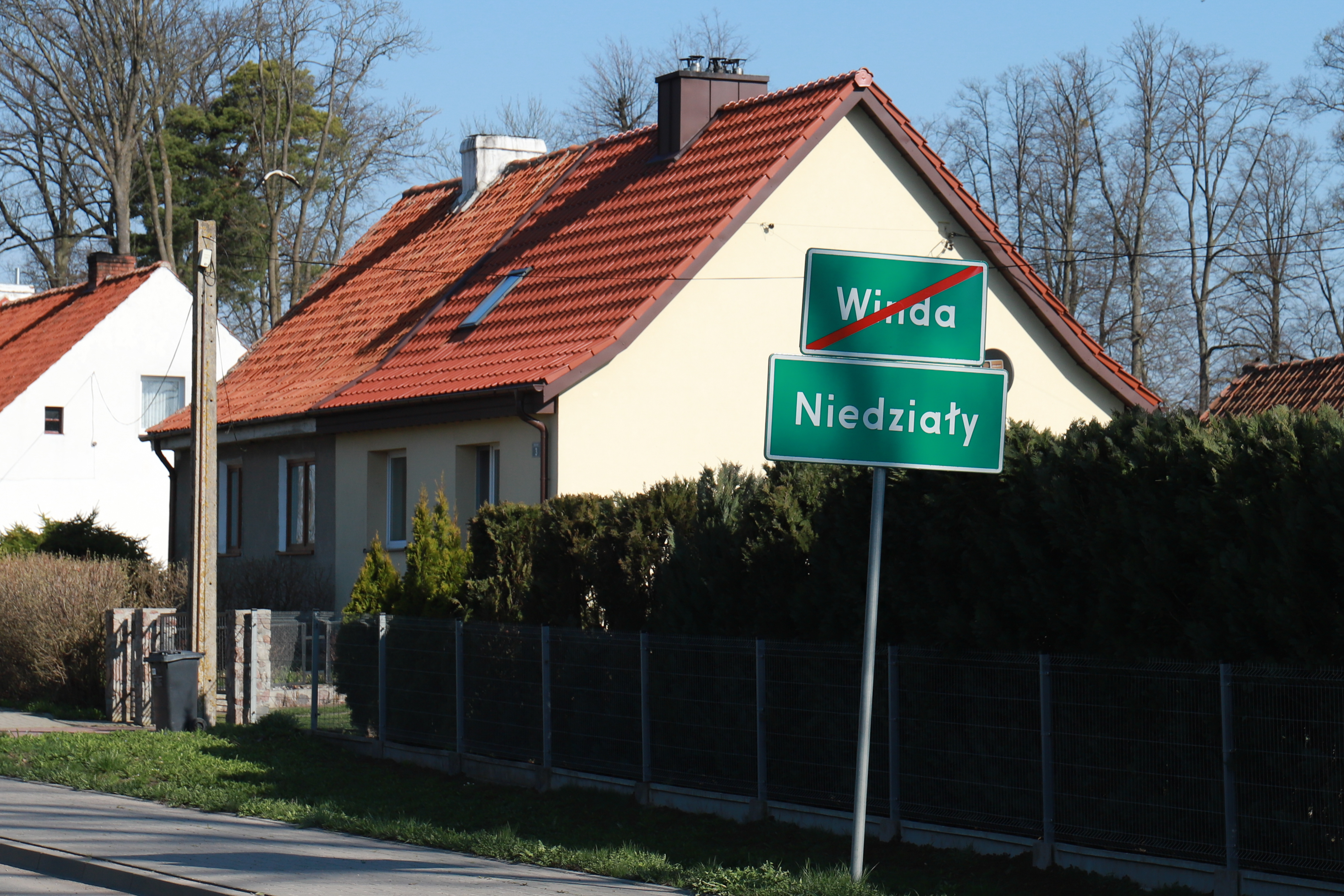

- Location within Poland
- Coordinates: 54°10′05″N 21°24′29″E
- Country: Poland
- Voivodeship: Warmian-Masurian
- County: Kętrzyn
- Gmina: Barciany

Niedziały [ɲɛˈd͡ʑawɨ] (German Elisenthal) is a village in the administrative district of Gmina Barciany, within Kętrzyn County, Warmian-Masurian Voivodeship, in northern Poland, close to the border with the Kaliningrad Oblast of Russia.
