= Pieszewo =

- Settlement
- Location within Poland
- Coordinates: 54°9′58″N 21°22′21″E
- Country: Poland
- Voivodeship: Warmian-Masurian
- County: Kętrzyn
- Gmina: Barciany

Pieszewo [pjɛˈʂɛvɔ] is a settlement in the administrative district of Gmina Barciany, within Kętrzyn County, Warmian-Masurian Voivodeship, in northern Poland, close to the border with the Kaliningrad Oblast of Russia.

== History ==
Pieszewo was originally just a few small farms. In 1785, it was mentioned as "a noble farming village" with eight fireplaces. In 1874, Pieszewo became part of the newly established administrative district of Wehlack (Polish Skierki) in the East Prussian district of Rastenburg.

On 30 September 1928, the rural municipality of Pieszewo expanded to include the neighboring village of Platlack (Polish Platławki, no longer in existence). On 23 May 1929, Pieszewo was reorganized into the Amtsbezirk Rodehlen (Polish Rodele), and on 1 April 1939, it was incorporated into the municipality of Rodehlen. Pieszewo was the first village in the district of Rodehlen.

Pieszewo haa total of 82 inhabitants in 1820, 49 in 1885, 33 in 1905, 26 in 1910, and 176 in 1933.
