= Gmina Barciany =

Gmina Barciany Barciany Commune
- Gmina
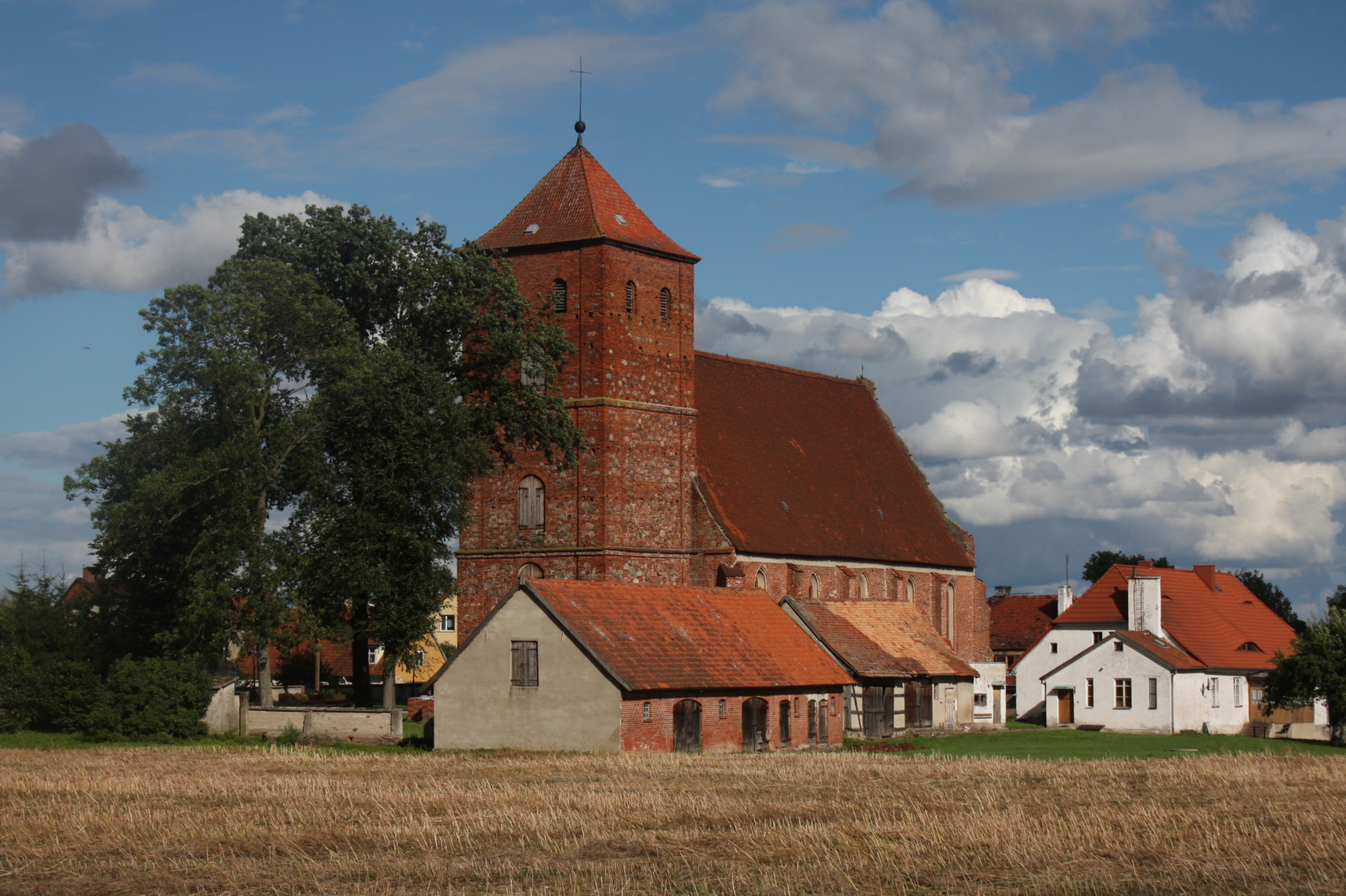

- Coat of arms
- Interactive map of Gmina Barciany
- Coordinates (Barciany): 54°13′N 21°21′E
- Country: Poland
- Voivodeship: Warmian-Masurian
- County: Kętrzyn
- Seat: Barciany

Area
  - Total: 293.62 km^{2} (113.37 sq mi)

Population (2006)
  - Total: 6,735
  - Density: 22.94/km^{2} (59.41/sq mi)
- Website: http://www.barciany.pl/

Gmina Barciany is a rural gmina (administrative district) in Kętrzyn County, Warmian-Masurian Voivodeship, in northern Poland, on the border with Russia. Its seat is the village of Barciany, which lies approximately 15 kilometres (9 mi) north of Kętrzyn and 74 km (46 mi) north-east of the regional capital Olsztyn.

The gmina covers an area of 293.62 square kilometres (113.4 sq mi), and as of 2006 its total population is 6,735.

== Villages ==
Gmina Barciany contains the villages and settlements of:

- Aptynty
- Arklity
- Asuny
- Barciany
- Błędowo
- Bobrowo
- Cacki
- Czaczek
- Dębiany
- Dobrzykowo
- Drogosze
- Duje
- Frączkowo
- Garbnik
- Garbno
- Gęsie Góry
- Gęsiki
- Gęsiniec Wielki
- Glinka
- Główczyno
- Górki
- Gradowo
- Gumniska
- Kiemławki Małe
- Kiemławki Wielkie
- Kolwiny
- Kotki
- Krelikiejmy
- Krymławki
- Krzeczewo
- Kudwiny
- Maciejki
- Markławka
- Markuzy
- Michałkowo
- Modgarby
- Mołtajny
- Momajny
- Moruny
- Niedziałki
- Niedziały
- Ogródki
- Pastwiska
- Pieszewo
- Piskorze
- Podławki
- Radoski Dwór
- Radosze
- Rodele
- Rowy
- Ruta
- Rutka
- Rzymek
- Silginy
- Skandawa
- Skierki
- Skoczewo
- Sławosze
- Solkieniki
- Staniszewo
- Stary Dwór Barciański
- Suchawa
- Święty Kamień
- Szaty Wielkie
- Taborzec
- Wielewo
- Wilkowo Małe
- Wilkowo Wielkie
- Winda
- Zalewska Góra

== Neighbouring gminas ==
Gmina Barciany is bordered by the gminas of Kętrzyn, Korsze, Sępopol and Srokowo. It also borders Russia (Kaliningrad oblast).
