= Wilkowo Wielkie =

- Village
- Location within Poland
- Coordinates: 54°12′28″N 21°14′57″E
- Country: Poland
- Voivodeship: Warmian-Masurian
- County: Kętrzyn
- Gmina: Barciany
- Population: 110

Wilkowo Wielkie [vilˈkɔvɔ ˈvjɛlkʲɛ] is a village in the administrative district of Gmina Barciany, within Kętrzyn County, Warmian-Masurian Voivodeship, in northern Poland, close to the border with the Kaliningrad Oblast of Russia.
