= Piskorze, Warmian-Masurian Voivodeship =

Piskorze
- Settlement
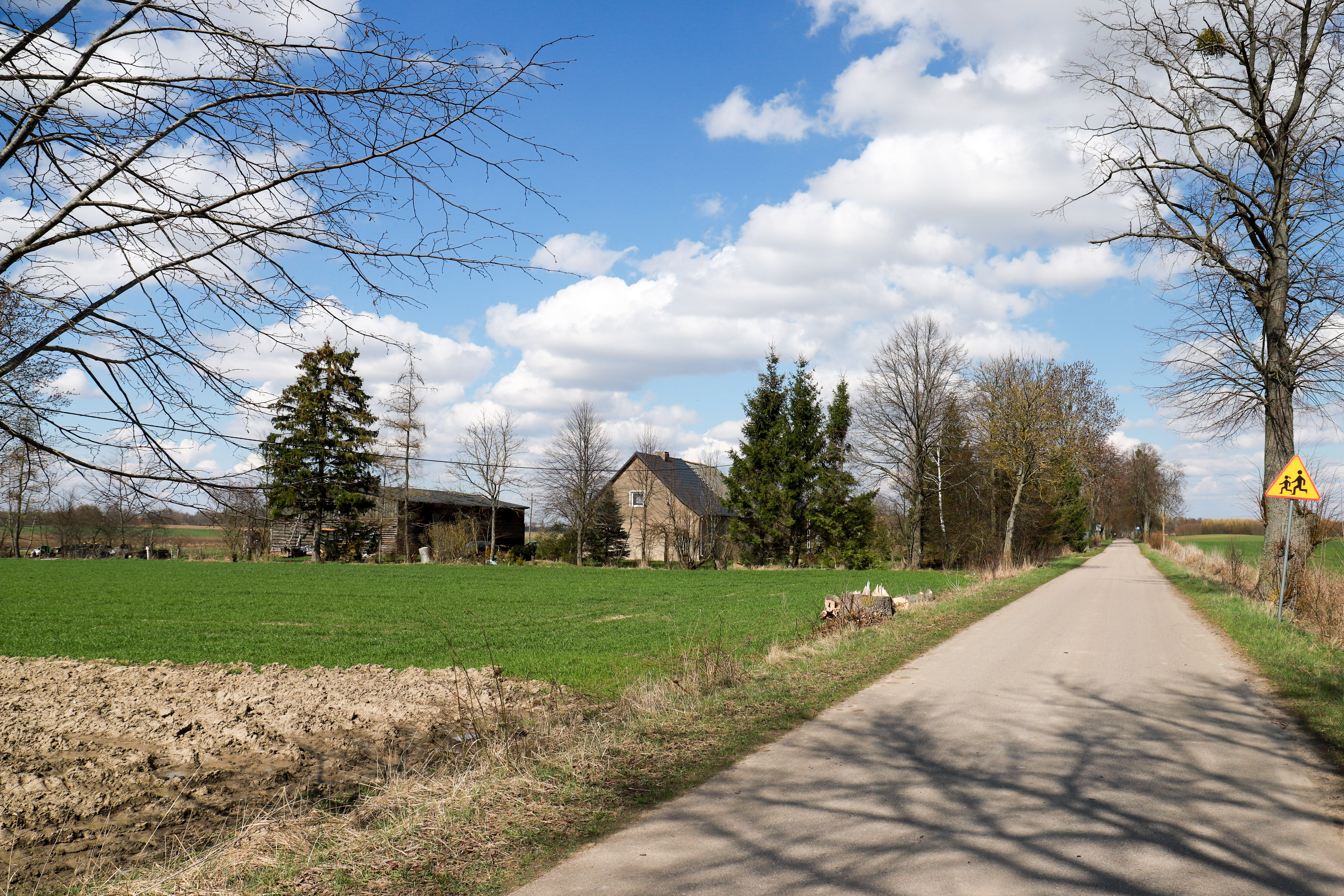

- Location within Poland
- Coordinates: 54°18′9″N 21°14′40″E
- Country: Poland
- Voivodeship: Warmian-Masurian
- County: Kętrzyn
- Gmina: Barciany

Piskorze [pisˈkɔʐɛ] is a settlement in the administrative district of Gmina Barciany, within Kętrzyn County, Warmian-Masurian Voivodeship, in northern Poland, close to the border with the Kaliningrad Oblast of Russia.
