= Kudwiny =

- Settlement
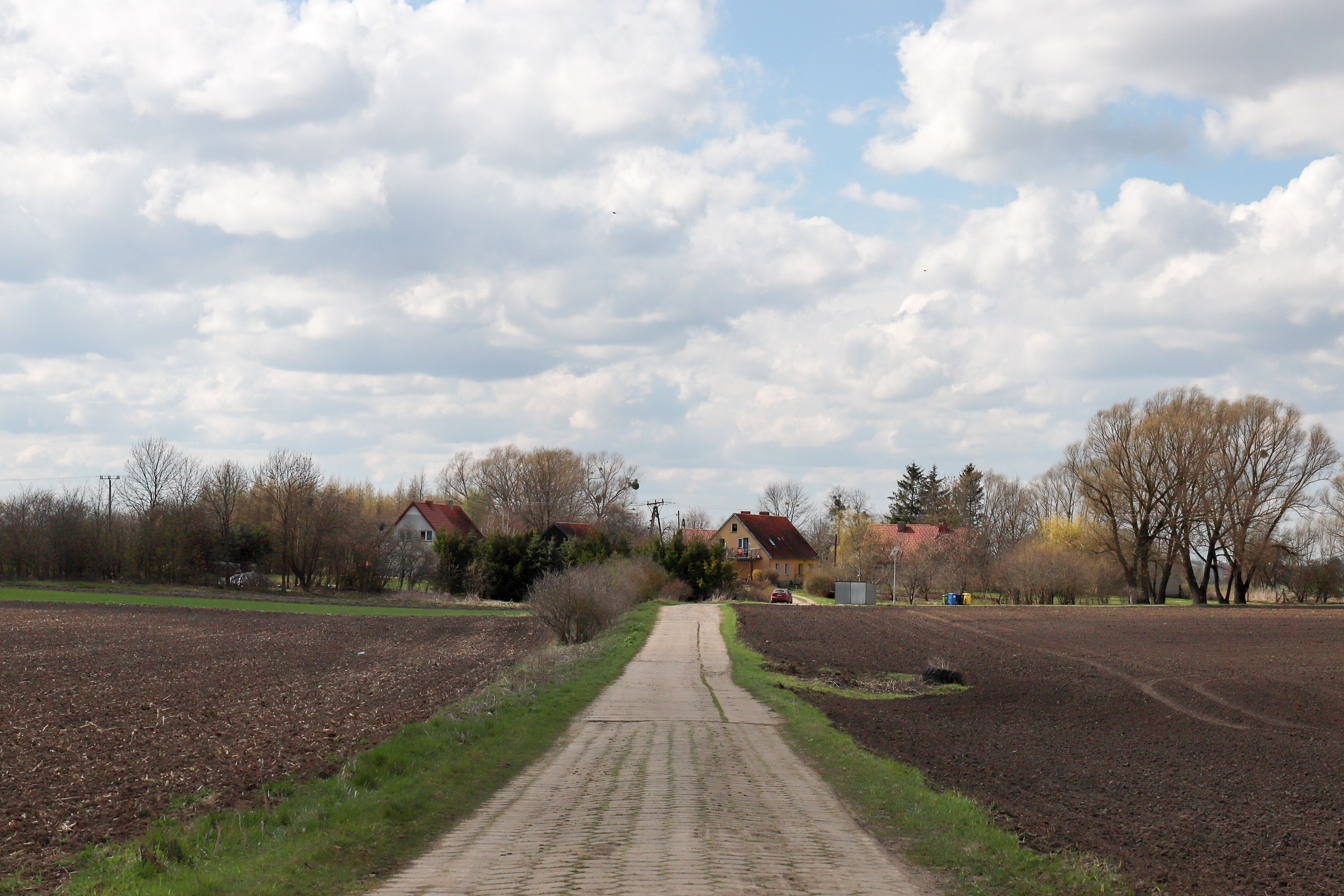

- Location within Poland
- Coordinates: 54°14′20″N 21°16′58″E
- Country: Poland
- Voivodeship: Warmian-Masurian
- County: Kętrzyn
- Gmina: Barciany
- Population: 20

Kudwiny [kudˈvinɨ] is a settlement in the administrative district of Gmina Barciany, within Kętrzyn County, Warmian-Masurian Voivodeship, in northern Poland, close to the border with the Kaliningrad Oblast of Russia.
