= Rowy, Warmian-Masurian Voivodeship =

Rowy
- Village
- Location within Poland
- Coordinates: 54°8′18″N 21°21′56″E
- Country: Poland
- Voivodeship: Warmian-Masurian
- County: Kętrzyn
- Gmina: Barciany

Rowy [ˈrɔvɨ] is a village in the administrative district of Gmina Barciany, within Kętrzyn County, Warmian-Masurian Voivodeship, in northern Poland, close to the border with the Kaliningrad Oblast of Russia.
