= Stary Dwór Barciański =

- Village
- Location within Poland
- Coordinates: 54°13′21″N 21°22′44″E
- Country: Poland
- Voivodeship: Warmian-Masurian
- County: Kętrzyn
- Gmina: Barciany
- Population: 139

Stary Dwór Barciański (Polish: [ˈstarɨ ˈdvur barˈt͡ɕaj̃skʲi]) is a village in the administrative district of Gmina Barciany, within Kętrzyn County, Warmian-Masurian Voivodeship, in northern Poland, close to the border with the Kaliningrad Oblast of Russia.
