= Modgarby =

- Village
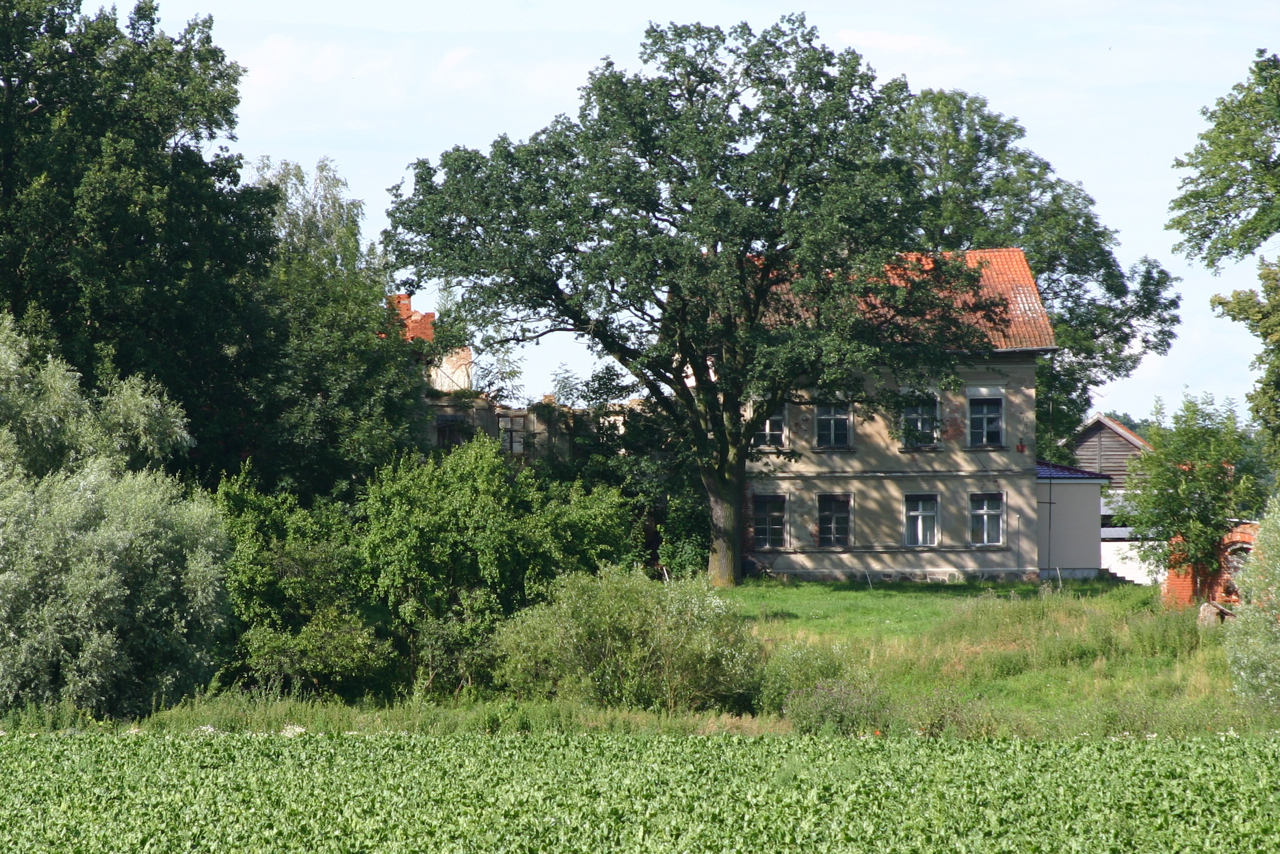

- Location within Poland
- Coordinates: 54°14′31″N 21°15′25″E
- Country: Poland
- Voivodeship: Warmian-Masurian
- County: Kętrzyn
- Gmina: Barciany
- Population: 130

Modgarby [mɔdˈɡarbɨ] is a village in the administrative district of Gmina Barciany, within Kętrzyn County, Warmian-Masurian Voivodeship, in northern Poland, close to the border with the Kaliningrad Oblast of Russia.
