= Gumniska, Warmian-Masurian Voivodeship =

Gumniska
- Village
- Location within Poland
- Coordinates: 54°12′N 21°23′E
- Country: Poland
- Voivodeship: Warmian-Masurian
- County: Kętrzyn
- Gmina: Barciany

Gumniska [ɡumˈniska] is a village in the administrative district of Gmina Barciany, within Kętrzyn County, Warmian-Masurian Voivodeship, in northern Poland, close to the border with the Kaliningrad Oblast of Russia.
