= Duje, Warmian-Masurian Voivodeship =

Duje
- Village
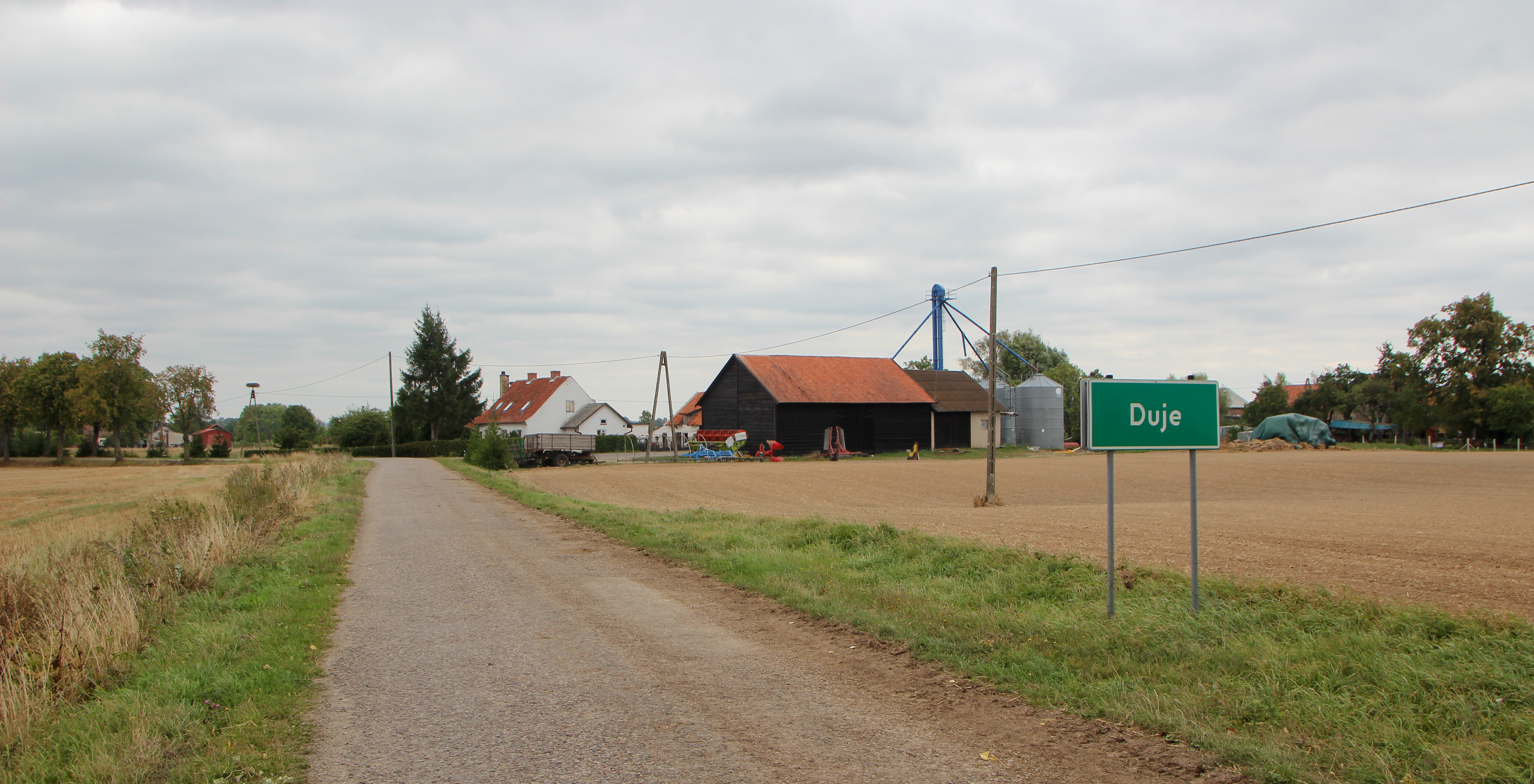
- Duje in 2015

- Location within Poland
- Coordinates: 54°19′37″N 21°21′57″E
- Country: Poland
- Voivodeship: Warmian–Masurian
- County: Kętrzyn
- Gmina: Barciany

Duje [dujɛ] is a village in Gmina Barciany, within Kętrzyn County, Warmian–Masurian Voivodeship, in north-eastern Poland. The village is situated on the border with Russia. The village is situated on the road from Mołtajny to Asuny. In 1975-1998 the village was located in Olsztyn Voivodeship.
