= Mołtajny =

- Village
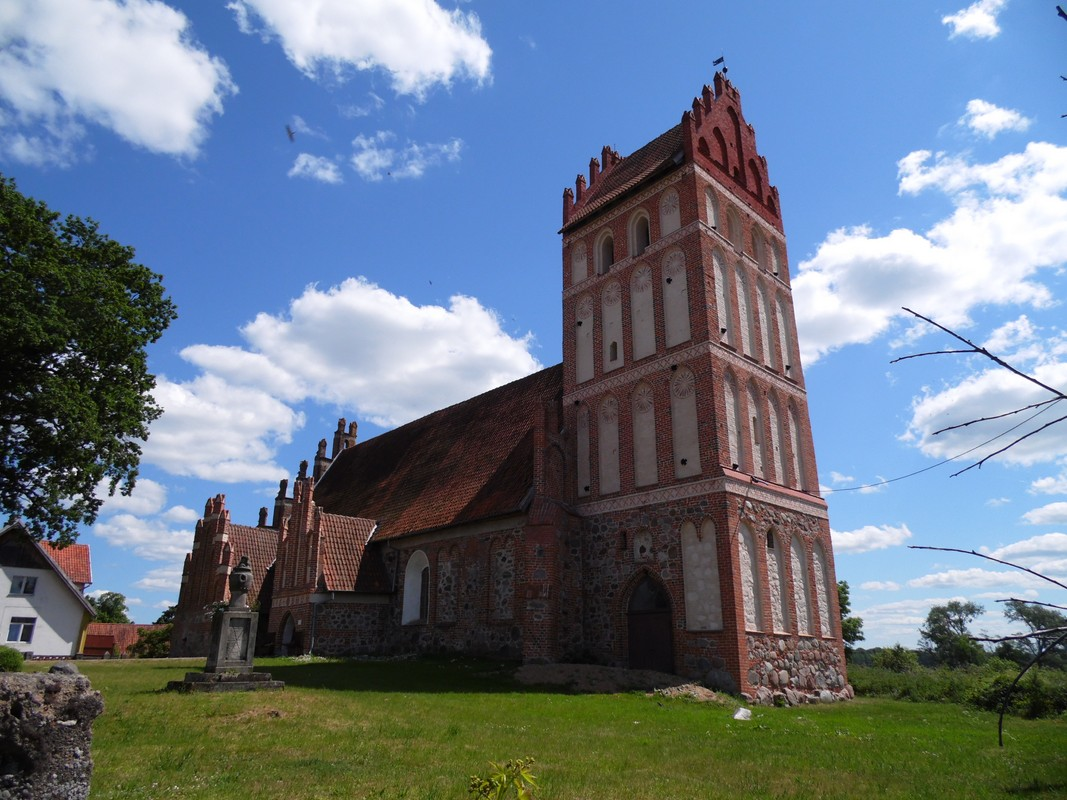

- Location within Poland
- Coordinates: 54°17′N 21°21′E
- Country: Poland
- Voivodeship: Warmian-Masurian
- County: Kętrzyn
- Gmina: Barciany
- Population: 760

Mołtajny [mɔu̯ˈtai̯nɨ] is a village in the administrative district of Gmina Barciany, within Kętrzyn County, Warmian-Masurian Voivodeship, in northern Poland, close to the border with the Kaliningrad Oblast of Russia.
