= Asuny =

- Village
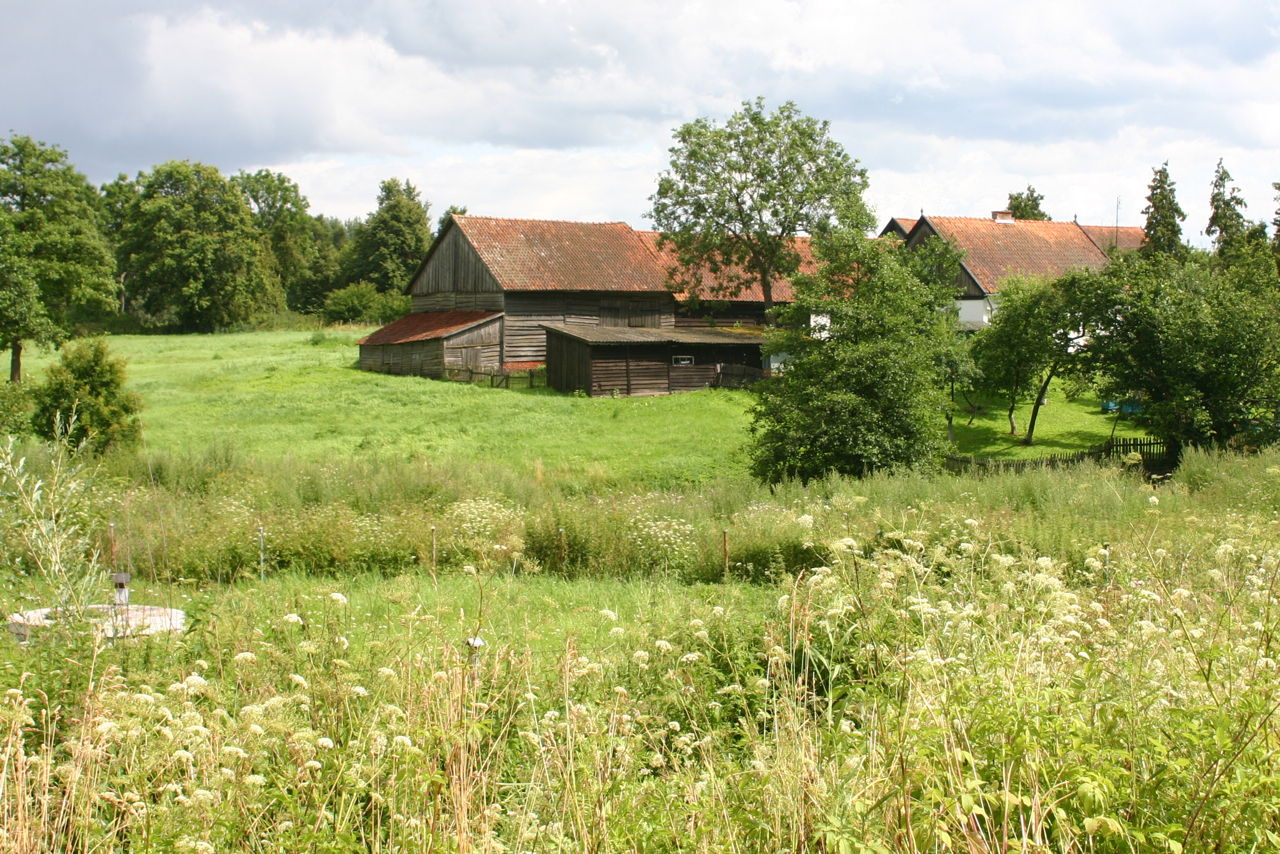

- Location within Poland
- Coordinates: 54°19′16″N 21°23′12″E
- Country: Poland
- Voivodeship: Warmian-Masurian
- County: Kętrzyn
- Gmina: Barciany

Population (approx.)
  - Total: 100
- Time zone: UTC+1 (CET)
  - Summer (DST): UTC+2 (CEST)
- Vehicle registration: NKE

Asuny [aˈsunɨ] is a village in the administrative district of Gmina Barciany, within Kętrzyn County, Warmian-Masurian Voivodeship, in northern Poland, close to the border with the Kaliningrad Oblast of Russia.

== History ==
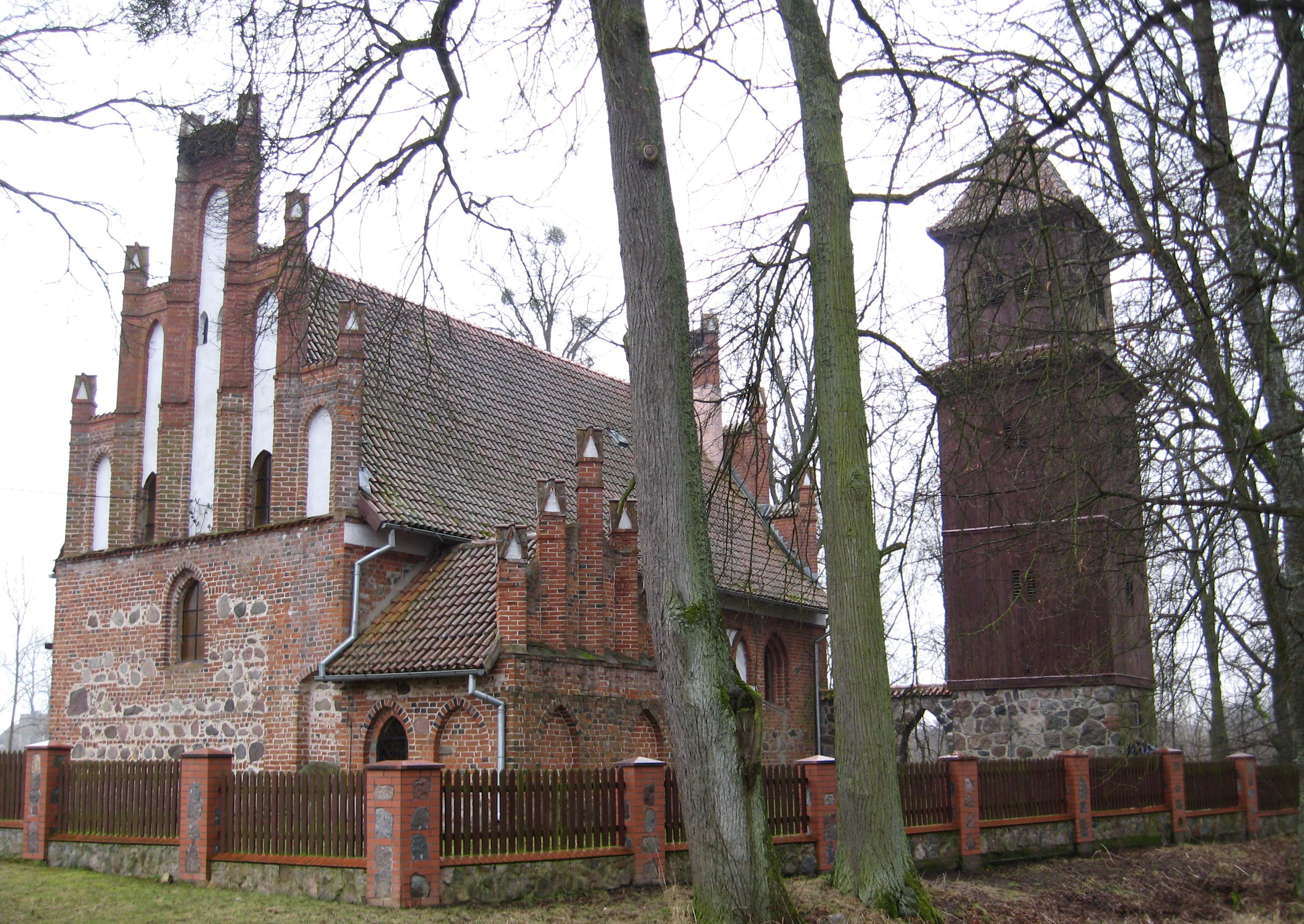
Medieval Gothic church

The village was inhabited by Polish people since the 15th century. In 1481, Polish priest Jakub de Coszmi from the Diocese of Płock was appointed the parish priest. As of 1664, Polish church services were held in the local church.
