= List of people from Nuremberg =

Following are some of the notable people from Nuremberg in Bavaria, Germany.

== Academia ==
=== Presidents and directors ===
- Ottmar Hörl (born 1950), an artist who was president and professor at the Academy of Fine Arts, Nuremberg
- August von Kreling (1818–1876), sculptor, painter, and director of the Academy of Fine Arts, Nuremberg
- Johann Daniel Preissler (1666–1737), painter and director of Nuremberg's Academy of Fine Arts
- Jacob von Sandrart (1630–1708), portrait and map engraver who founded and was and first director of the Nuremberg Academy of Fine Arts

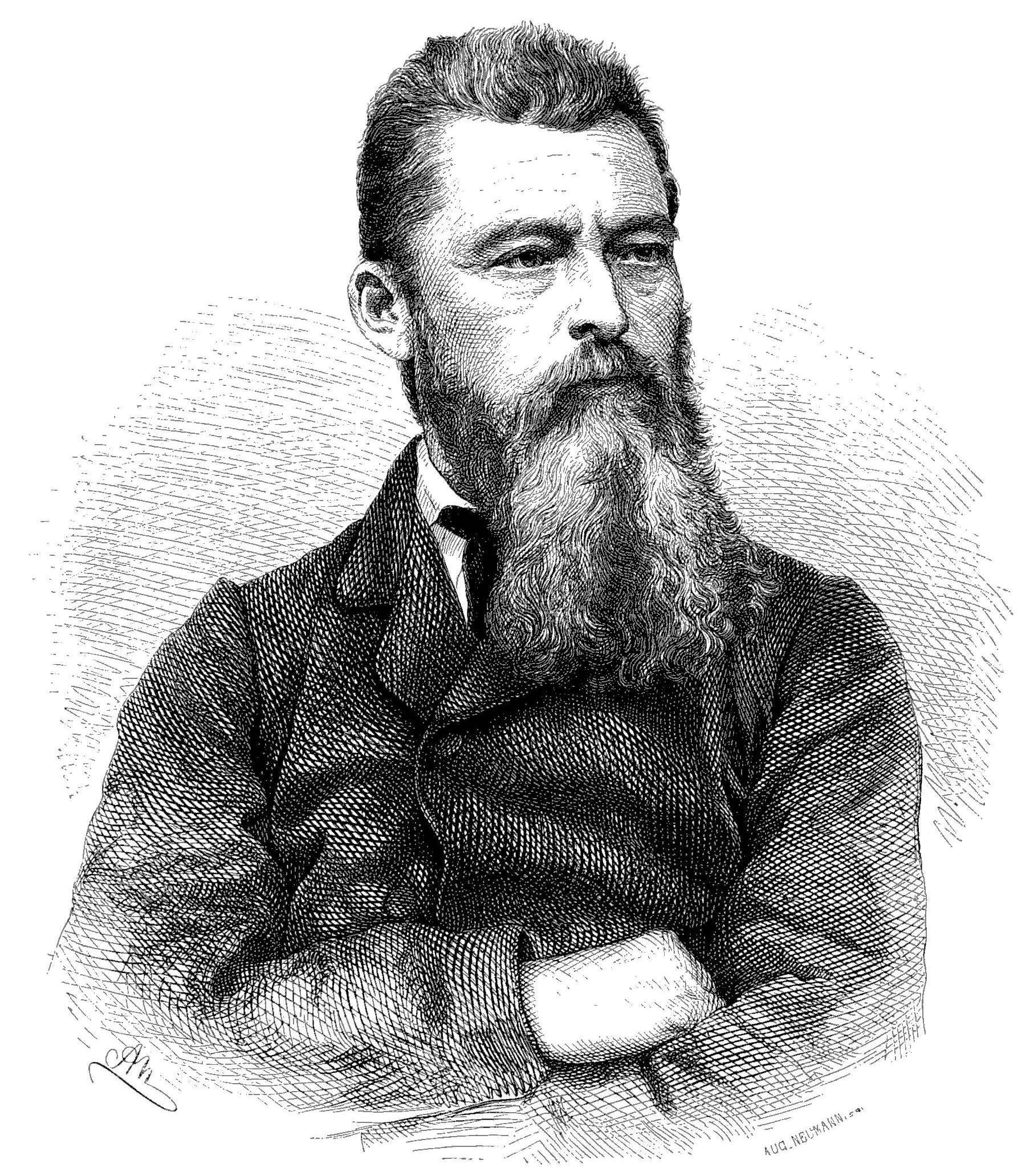
Ludwig Andreas Feuerbach

=== Professors ===
- Heinz Bauer (1925–2002), mathematician and professor at the University of Erlangen-Nuremberg
- Johann Bauschinger (1834–1893), professor of Engineering Mechanics at Munich Polytechnic
- Hermann Beckh (1875–1937), pioneering Tibetologist and prominent promoter of anthroposophy.
- Hermann Bek-Gran (1869–1909), painter, graphic artist, typographer, and professor of the Academy of Fine Arts, Nuremberg
- Wolfgang Bibel (born 1938), professor emeritus at the Department of Computer Science of the Technische Universität Darmstadt
- Gustav Bischof (1792–1870), geologist, chemist, and professor at the University of Bonn
- Ingo Böbel (1947–2020), professor of economics at the International University of Monaco from 2000 to 2020
- Johann Cochlaeus (1479–1552), humanist, music theorist, and dean of the Liebfrauenkirche at Frankfurt
- William Craig (1918–2016), philosopher who taught at the University of California, Berkeley
- Johann Gabriel Doppelmayr (1677–1750), astronomer, mathematician, and professor of mathematics at the Aegidien-Gymnasium
- Christian Enzensberger (1931–2009), professor of English studies, author and a translator of English literature into German
- Dieter Fensel (born 1960), professor at the University of Innsbruck and director of the Semantic Technologies Institute Innsbruck
- Ludwig Andreas Feuerbach (1804–1872), anthropologist and philosopher, best known for his book The Essence of Christianity
- Manfred M. Fischer (born 1947), regional scientist and emeritus professor of economic geography at the WU-Vienna University of Economics and Business
- Wilhelm Geiger (1856–1943), Orientalist in the fields of Indo-Iranian languages and the history of Iran and Sri Lanka
- Heinz Gollwitzer (1917–1999), chair of modern political and social history at the University of Münster
- Heinrich Guggenheimer (1924–2021), mathematician and professor of University of Minnesota
- Paula Hahn-Weinheimer (1917–2002), geochemist and professor at the Technical University of Munich
- Lisa Herzog (born 1983), professor at the Center for Philosophy, Politics and Economics at the University of Groningen
- Rudolf Hickel (born 1942), chair of public finance at University of Bremen
- Wolfgang Kaiser (1925–2023), professor for experimental physics at the Technical University of Munich
- Uwe Kitzinger (1928–2023), an academic who specialized in international relations
- Wolfgang Koch (born 1962), physicist and computer scientist who teaches at the University of Bonn
- Gerhard Koeppel (1936 –2012), historian of Roman art, resident scholar at the American Academy in Rome, and professor of classics at the University of North Carolina at Chapel Hill
- Hermann Leuchs (1879–1945), head of the chemistry institute of the University of Berlin
- Paul Carl Leygebe (1664–1756), painter and anatomy professor at the Prussian Academy of Arts
- Hans Eberhard Mayer (1932–2023), professor of medieval and modern history at Kiel University
- Anthony Oettinger (1929–2022), computer scientist who co-founded the Program on Information Resources Policy at Harvard University.
- Johan Martin Preisler (1715 –1794), engraver and professor at the Royal Danish Academy of Fine Arts
- Volker Roemheld (1941–2013), agricultural scientist, plant physiologist, and soil biologist at Hohenheim University
- Manfred Rühl (born 1933), professor of communications at University of Erlangen–Nuremberg and the University of Bamberg
- Gerard Salton (1927–1995), professor of computer science at Cornell University and "the father of Information retrieval"
- Diet Sayler (born 1939), painter, sculptor, and professor of painting at the Academy of Fine Arts, Nuremberg
- Christoph von Scheurl (1481–1542), professor of law at Wittenberg University
- Matthias Schwab (born 1963), chair of Clinical Pharmacology at the University of Tübingen and medical director of the Department of Clinical Pharmacology at the University Hospital Tübingen
- Daniel Schwenter (1585–1636), professor of Semitic languages and mathematics at the University of Altdorf
- Peter Seeberger (born 1966), professor of chemistry at Massachusetts Institute of Technology and at ETH Zurich
- Johann Philipp Siebenkees (1759–1796), philosopher and professor at the University of Altdorf
- Hartmut Steinecke (1940–2020), professor of Modern German Literature at the University of Bonn
- Alexander Strehl, computer scientist and professor at the University of Aalen
- Karl Süssheim (1878–1947), Islamic historian and professor at LMU Munich
- Conrad Tockler (1470–1530), rector magnificus and professor of the quadrivium at Leipzig University
- Heiko Uecker (1939–2019), professor of Nordic Philology at the University of Bonn
- Johann Christoph Wagenseil (1633–1705), chair of ecclesiastical law and professor of history, civil law, and Semitic languages at the University of Altdorf
- Isabella Weber (born 1987), economist and an assistant professor of economics at the University of Massachusetts Amherst

== Architecture ==
- Heinrich Beheim (died 1403), stone mason and architect
- German Bestelmeyer (1874–1942), architect and proponent of Nazi architecture
- Georg Andreas Böckler (c. 1617–1687), architect and engineer who wrote Architectura Curiosa Nova (1664) and Theatrum Machinarum Novum (1661)
- Paul Buchner (1531–1607), architect, geometer, carpenter and screw maker
- Eva Buhrich (1915–1976), architect and writer who fled Nazi Germany and became a prominent architectural commentator in Australia
- Adolf Foehr (1880–1943) architect, city planner, and building supervisor.
- Herta Hammerbacher (1900–1985), landscape architect who taught at the Technische Hochschule Charlottenburg (now Technische Universität Berlin)
- Adam Kraft (c. 1460–1509), stone sculptor, master builder and architect
- Paul Pfann (1860–1919), architect in the Historicist style and professor at the Technical University of Munich
- Hubert Ritter (1886–1967), architect, urban planner and building official
- Paul Ritter (1829–1907), architectural painter and etcher
- Sep Ruf (1908–1982), architect and designer associated with the Bauhaus group

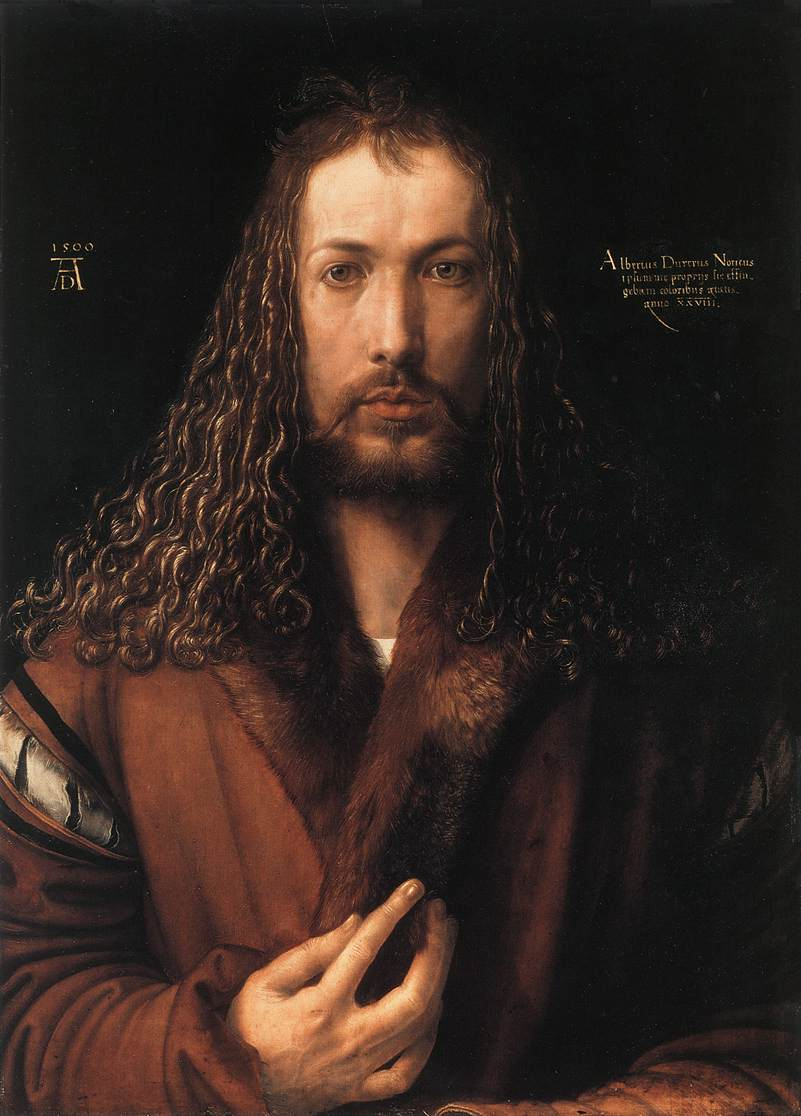
Albrecht Dürer

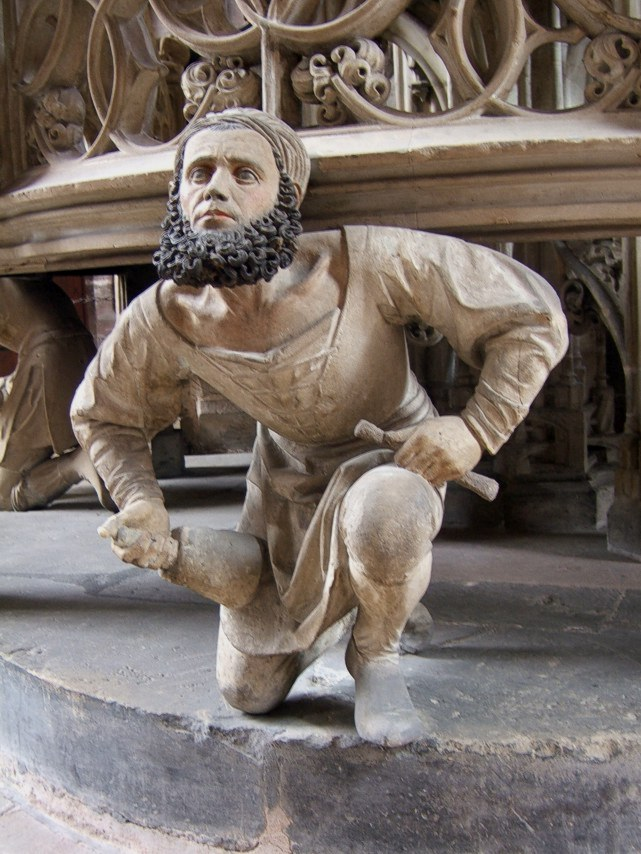
Adam Kraft

== Art ==
- Caroline Achaintre (1969), mixed media artist
- Bernhard Afinger (1813–1882), sculptor
- Peter Angermann (born 1945), painter
- Johann Paul Auer (1636–1687), painter
- Ernst Aufseeser (1880–1940), painter, illustrator and graphic designer
- Barthel Beham (1502–1540), engraver, miniaturist, and painter
- Sebald Beham (1500–1550), painter and printmaker mainly known for his very small engravings
- Willem van Bemmel (1630–1708), Dutch Golden Age landscape painter
- Peter von Bemmel (1686–1754), landscape artist
- Anna Katharina Block (1642–1719), Baroque flower painter
- Esther Barbara Bloemart (1651–1733), was a German art collector
- Hans Bolsterer (died 1573), sculptor, carver and medalist
- Werner Braun (1918–2018), photographer, considered a founder of photojournalism in Israel
- Cristoforo Coriolano (born 1540), engraver
- Gabriela Dauerer (born 1958), contemporary artist
- Hans Decker, sculptor
- Joachim Deschler (c. 1500–1571), sculptor and medalist.
- Barbara Regina Dietzsch (1706–1783), painter and engraver known for still lifes
- Hans Dürer (1490 – c. 1538), German Renaissance painter, illustrator, and engraver
- Agnes Dürer (1475–1539) wife and model of artist Albrecht Dürer who helped run his workshops
- Albrecht Dürer (1471–1528), painter, engraver, printmaker, and theorist of the German Renaissance
- Heinrich Egersdörfer (1853–1915), artist, illustrator and cartoonist
- Michael Sigismund Frank (1770–1847), Catholic artist, rediscovered glass-painting
- Magdalena Rosina Funck (1672–1695), botanical illustrator
- Magdalena Fürstin (1652–1717), artist and hand-colorist
- Peter Gertner (c. 1495 – after 1541), painter
- Dorothea Maria Graff (1678–1743), painter
- Jonas Haas (1720–1775), engraver
- Jobst Harrich (1579–1617), painter
- Guenter Heim (1935–2014), artist known for impressionistic landscapes of western Canada
- Johanna Helena Herolt (1668–1723), artist
- Werner Heubeck (1923–2009), British transport executive
- Augustin Hirschvogel (1503–1553), artist, mathematician, and cartographer
- Stefan Hirsch (1899–1964), artist.
- Hans Hoffmann (1530–1591), painter, draftsman, and leading representative of the Dürer Renaissance
- Karl Jäger (1833–1887), painter
- Wenzel Jamnitzer (c. 1507–1585), goldsmith and artist
- Paul Juvenel the Elder (1579–1643), painter
- Anna Klein (1883–1941), landscape, animal, and genre painter
- Johann Adam Klein (1792–1875), painter and engraver
- Rudolf Koch (1876–1934), type designer and a master of lettering, calligraphy, typography and illustration
- Johann König (1586–1642), painter known for painting copper panels
- Eliyahu Koren (1907–2001), master typographer, graphic artist, and designer
- Adam Kraft (c. 1460–1509), stone sculptor, master builder and architect
- Jobst Kuch (1902–1963), painter
- Hans von Kulmbach (1480–1522), artist
- Hanns Lautensack (1524 – c. 1560), etcher and draughtsman
- Heinrich Lautensack (1522–1590), painter and goldsmith
- Kunz Lochner (1510–1567), armourer, blacksmith, silversmith, and court armourer for Maximilian II
- Leo Marchutz (1903–1976), painter and lithographer
- Gustav Metzger (1926–2017), artist and political activist who developed the concept of Auto-Destructive Art and the Art Strike.
- John Miller (1715 – c. 1792), botanical illustrator, engraver, painter, and botanist
- Georg Mühlberg (1863–1925), painter, draftsman and illustrator of children's books
- Amalia Pachelbel (1688–1723), painter and engraver
- Georg Pencz (c. 1500 –1550), engraver, painter, and printmaker
- Georg Karl Pfahler (1926–2002), painter, printmaker, and sculptor
- Georg Martin Preisler (fl. 1750), engraver
- Johann Justin Preissler (1698–1771), painter and draughtsman
- Valentin Daniel Preisler (1717–1765), engraver
- Maria Katharina Prestel (1747–1794), engraver and painter
- Doris Raab (1851–1933), etcher and engraver
- Johann Leonhard Raab (1825–1899), printmaker and painter
- William Frederic Ritschel (1864–1949), California impressionist painter
- Lorenz Ritter (1832–1921), painter and etcher
- Paulus Roetter (1806–1894), landscape painter who became a prominent botanical and ichthyological artist
- Ferdinand Rothbart (1823–1899), draftsman, illustrator, history painter, and curator for the Staatliche Graphische Sammlung
- Philipp Rupprecht (1900–1975), cartoonist of anti-Semitic caricatures
- Susanne Maria von Sandrart (1658–1716), artist and engraver
- Eduard Sauer (1899–1975), painter
- Paul Schad-Rossa (1862–1916), painter and sculptor, in the Symbolist style
- Hans Leonhard Schäufelein (c. 1480–1540), artist, painter, and designer of woodcuts
- Erhard Schön (c. 1491–1542), woodcut designer and painter.
- Martina Schradi (born 1972), cartoonist
- Carl Max Schultheiss (1885–1961), graphic designer
- Matthias Schultheiss (born 1946), graphic novel artist
- Christine Silberhorn (born 1974), physicist and professor at Paderborn University
- Virgil Solis (1514–1562), draughtsman and printmaker in engraving, etching and woodcut
- Johann Sperl (1840–1914), painter
- Hans Springinklee (c. 1490 – c. 1540), artist known for his woodcuts
- Dora Stock (1760–1832), artist who specialized in portraiture
- Veit Stoss (c. 1450–1533), Renaissance sculptor, mostly in wood
- Juergen Teller (born 1964), fine art and fashion photographer
- Carl Marcus Tuscher (1705–1751), portrait painter, printmaker, architect, and decorator
- Peter Vischer the Elder (c. 1455–1529), sculptor
- August Weger (1823–1892), graphic artist, steel engraver and printer.
- Michael Wening (1645–1718), engraver
- Michael Wolgemut (1434–1519), painter and printmaker
- Hermann Zapf (1918–2015), typographer and calligrapher
- Matthias Zündt (1498–1586), engraver
- Gustav Philipp Zwinger (1779–1819), painter and etcher

== Business ==
- Siegfried Bettmann (1868–1951), bicycle, motorcycle and car manufacturer
- Theodor von Cramer-Klett (1817–1884), entrepreneur and banker
- Ronald Grierson (1921–2014), managing director of S.G. Warburg and vice-chairman of General Electric Company
- Max Grundig (1908–1989), founder of electronics company Grundig AG
- Werner Heubeck (1923–2009), transport executive, managing director of the Northern Ireland transport companies Ulsterbus and Citybus
- Adil Kaya (born 1967), CEO of SIGOS
- Georg Leykauf (born 1847), steel metalware producer and trader
- Andy W. Mattes (born 1963), president and chief executive of Diebold
- Max Michaelis (1852–1932), South African mining magnate
- Georg Zacharias Platner (1779–1862), manufacturer-entrepreneur
- Madeleine Schickedanz (born 1943), heiress and philanthropist known for founding Madeleine Schickedanz KinderKrebs-Stiftung
- Ulman Stromer (1329–1407), trader and factory owner

== Cartography ==
- Martin Behaim (1459–1507), cartographer best known for his Erdapfel, the world's oldest known globe
- Erhard Etzlaub (c. 1455–1532), cartographer, astronomer, geodesist, and instrument maker
- Hartmann Schedel (1440–1514), one of the first cartographers to use the printing press, best known for his writing the text for the Nuremberg Chronicle

== Engineering ==
- Andreas Albrecht (1586–1628), mathematician, engineer, and inventor of a variety of instruments,
- David Beringer (1756–1821), scientific instrument maker and craftsman
- Michael Bümel, maker of scientific and surveying instruments
- Hans Düringer (died 1477), clockmaker
- Hermann Föttinger (1877–1945), engineer and inventor
- Peter Henlein (1485–1542), locksmith and clockmaker who invented the world's first watch
- Andre Kaup, electrical engineer at the University of Erlangen-Nuremberg
- Karl Küpfmüller (1897–1977), electrical engineer who worked in communications technology
- Adolph Friedrich Lindemann (1846–1931), engineer and businessman who was involved in the Transatlantic telegraph cable project
- Otto Metzger (1885–1961), engineer and inventor
- Wilhelm Nusselt (1882–1957), engineer
- Norbert Riedel (1912–1963), engineer
- Johann Sigmund Schuckert (1846–1895), electrical engineer and pioneer of the electrical industry
- Robert Thelen (1884–1968), aviation pioneer and designer.
- Martin Vossiek, engineer at the University of Erlangen-Nuremberg

== Entertainment ==
- Tom Beck (born 1978), actor, singer, and entrepreneur
- Hans Berthel (1914–2003), film art director
- Heinz Bernard (1923–1994), actor and director and theatre manager
- Sandra Bullock (born 1964), actress, producer, and philanthropist
- Annette Carell (1926–1967), actress
- Christoph Dreher (born 1952), filmmaker, musician and scriptwriter
- Angela Finger-Erben (born 1980), TV presenter and journalist for RTL Television.
- Herbert Fleischmann (1925–1984), film and television actor
- Katy Garretson (born 1963), television director and producer
- Nina Gnädig (born 1977), actress
- Ozan Güven (born 1975), film, television, and theatre actor and screenwriter.
- Margarete Haagen (1889–1966), actress
- Johann Kaspar Hechtel (1771–1799), designer of parlor games including the prototype for the Petit Lenormand cartomancy deck
- Thomas Hermanns (born 1963), television presenter, comedian, screenwriter and director
- Rudy Horn (1933–2018), juggler
- Şermin Langhoff (born 1969), director of the Maxim Gorki Theater
- Marcel-André Casasola Merkle (1977), video game designer
- Friedrich Georg Leonhard Miedke (1803–1842), actor, singer, composer, and theatre director
- Kurt Neumann (1908–1958), film director
- Mirjam Novak, television and film actress and screenwriter
- Wolfgang Preiss (1910–2002), actor
- Tobias Rosen, Academy Award-nominated film producer
- Hanns Zischler (born 1947), film actor

== Law ==
- Wolfgang Fikentscher (1928–2015), jurist, legal anthropologist, and professor at University of Münster School of Law, University of Tübingen, and University of California at Berkeley School of Law
- Jude Pate, justice of the Alaska Supreme Court
- Gerhard Schricker (1935–2021) legal scholar and professor at LMU Munich
- Hildegund Sünderhauf, family law professor at the Lutheran University of Applied Sciences Nuremberg
- Anna Maria Zwanziger (1760–1811), serial killer

== Literature and journalism ==
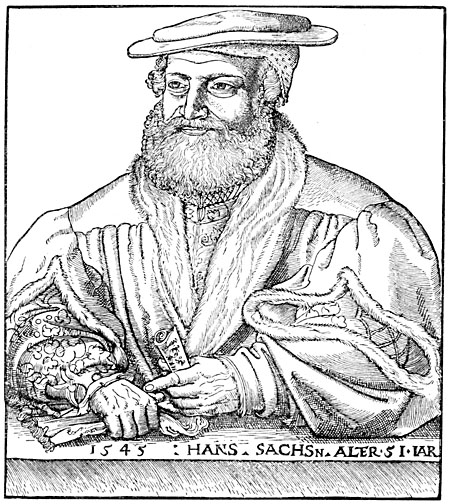
Hans Sachs

- Lilly Becher (1901–1978), writer, journalist, and one of the first anti-Nazi writers
- Karl Ewald Böhm (1913–1977), writer who served as Director of East Germany's Central Publishing Department
- Georg Friedrich Daumer (1800–1875), poet and philosopher
- Gisela Elsner (1937–1992), novelist who won the Prix Formentor
- Hans Folz (c. 1437–1513), author and poet
- Helene von Forster (1859–1923), women's rights activist and author
- Katharina Gerlachin (c. 1517–1592), printer and publisher
- Hans Glaser (c. 1500–1573), printer, block-cutter, woodcut winter, and publisher
- Claire Goll (1890–1977), writer and journalist
- Hans Wilhelm Hammerbacher (1903–1980), author
- Wilfried Happel (born 1965), playwright and author of radio plays and film scripts
- Bertita Harding (1902–1971), royal German biographer
- Georg Philipp Harsdörffer (1607–1658), jurist, poet, and translator
- Karl von Hegel (1813–1901), author and historian
- Robert Ludwig Kahn (1923–1970), poet
- Hermann Kesten (1900–1996), novelist and dramatist
- Anton Koberger (c. 1440–1513), bookseller who established the first printing house in Nuremberg, known as the publisher of the Nuremberg Chronicle
- Robert Kurz (1943–2012), Marxist philosopher, social critic, journalist, and editor of Exit!
- Christoph Gottlieb von Murr (1733–1811), historian and journal editor
- Eugen Ortner (1890–1947), playwright and writer
- Peter Owen (1927–2016), publisher and founder of Peter Owen Publishers
- Johannes Petreius (c. 1497–1550), printer
- Johann Rietsch (1778–1814), poet
- Franz Schmidt (1555–1634), diarist
- Timur Vermes (born 1967), writer
- Johann Vogel (1589–1663), poet and Lutheran minister

== Medicine ==
- Lucie Adelsberger (1895–1971), Jewish physician, imprisoned at Auschwitz and Ravensbrück
- Karl Bechert (1901–1981), theoretical physicist
- Joachim Camerarius the Younger (1534–1598), physician, botanist, and zoologist
- Johanna Hellman (1889–1982), surgeon
- Ruth Illig (1924–2017), pediatric endocrinologist and a professor of pediatrics at the University of Zurich
- Friedrich Sigmund Merkel (1845–1919), anatomist and histopathologist
- Marion Rosen (1914–2012), physiotherapist who developed the Rosen Method
- Fredric Wertham (1895–1981), psychiatrist

== Military ==
- Friedrich Beckh (1908–1942), World War II military aviator
- Edmund Blaurock (1899–1966), general in the army of Nazi Germany during World War II
- Gustav Fehn (1892– 1945), German general during World War II
- Otto Heinrich Fugger, Count of Kirchberg (1592–1644), professional soldier in Imperial and Bavarian service during the Thirty Year's War
- Hugo Gutmann (1880–1962), German Jewish army officer
- Georg Haus (1895–1945), general in the Wehrmacht of Nazi Germany during World War II
- Karl Herzog (1906–1998), German officer in the Wehrmacht during World War II
- Carl Hilpert (1888–1947), German general during World War II
- Heinz Kemethmüller (1914–1984), Luftwaffe ace and recipient of the Knight's Cross of the Iron Cross during World War II
- Fritz Ritter von Kraußer (1888–1934), SA-Obergruppenführer killed in the Night of the Long Knives
- Friedrich Freiherr Kress von Kressenstein (1870–1948), German general who assisted in the direction of the Ottoman Army during World War I
- Hanns Laengenfelder (1903–1982), German general during World War II
- Hans Michahelles (1899–1975), German admiral during World War II
- Egbert Picker (1895–1960), General in the Wehrmacht of Nazi Germany during World War II
- Friedrich Ritter von Röth (1893–1918), German World War I fighter ace
- Karl Schnörrer (1919–1979), German military aviator who served in the Luftwaffe during World War II
- Otto Sponheimer (1886–1961), German General of the Infantry during World War II
- Heinrich Thoma (1891–1948), German general during World War II
- Arnold Hans Weiss (1924–2010), U.S. Army intelligence officer who helped find Hitler's will

== Music ==
- Pierre Alamire (c. 1470–1536), music copyist, composer, and instrumentalist
- Chaya Arbel (1921–2007), Israeli classical composer
- Johannes Bastiaan (1911–2012), violinist
- Albert Bittner (1900–1980), conductor and Generalmusikdirektor
- Harald Blüchel (born 1966), electronic artist who is mostly known under his alias Cosmic Baby
- Karl-Walter Böhm (1938–2000), opera singer
- Kevin Coyne (1944–2004), musician, singer, composer, film-maker, and writer
- Hans Deinzer (1934–2020), clarinetist
- Joerg Deisinger (born 1966), bassist and a founding member of the band Bonfire
- Jacob Denner (1681–1735), woodwind instrument maker
- Hugo Distler (1908–1942), organist, choral conductor, teacher, and composer
- Dhurata Dora (born 1992), singer and songwriter
- Cornelius Heinrich Dretzel (c. 1697–1775), organist and composer
- Gerald Eckert (born 1960), composer, cellist, and painter
- Max Erdmannsdörfer (1848–1905), conductor, pianist and composer
- Christina Gerstberger (born 1976), operatic soprano
- Sascha Gerstner (born 1977), guitarist and member of the band Helloween
- Gunther Göbbel (born 1979), singer who took part in Deutschland sucht den Superstar
- Ernst Gröschel (1918–2000), pianist
- Johann Wilhelm Haas (1649–1723), trumpet maker and engraver
- Hans Leo Hassler (1564–1612), composer and organist
- Jakob Hassler (1569–1622), Renaissance composer
- Kasper Hassler (1562–1618), organist and composer
- Johann Andreas Herbst (1588–1666), composer and music theorist
- Sebald Heyden (1499–1561), musicologist, cantor, theologian and hymn-writer
- Stefan Hippe (born 1966), composer, conductor and accordionist
- Carl van der Hoeven (1580–1661), composer and organist
- Hans Hopf (1916–1993), operatic tenor
- Willy Horváth (1917–2011), violinist
- Siegfried Jerusalem (born 1940), operatic tenor
- Johann Erasmus Kindermann (1616–1655), Baroque organist and composer
- Georg Andreas Kraft (c. 1660–1726), Baroque composer and musician
- Karl August Krebs (1804–1880), pianist, composer, conductor and Kapellmeister
- Walter Kreppel (1923–2003), bass singer known for his opera performances
- Johann Krieger (1651–1735), composer and organist
- Johann Philipp Krieger (c. 1649-1725), Baroque composer and organist
- Rudi Mahall (born 1966), contemporary jazz bass clarinet player
- Marusha (born 1966), electronic music disc jockey, producer, and television presenter
- Johannes Menke (born 1972), music theorist and composer.
- Martha Mödl (1912–2001), Wagner soprano/mezzo-soprano
- Bernhard Molique (1802–1869), violinist and composer
- Sebastian Ochsenkun (1521-1574), composer
- Johann Pachelbel (1653–1706), composer, organist, and teacher
- Conrad Paumann (c. 1410–1473), organist, lutenist and composer
- Johann Pfeiffer (1697–1761), violinist, concert master, and composer of the late baroque period
- Deva Premal (born 1970), singer known for introducing Sanskrit mantras into the mainstream
- Franz Reizenstein (1911–1968), composer and concert pianist
- Ulrich Rück (1882–1962), collector of musical instruments and dealer in pianos
- Hans Sachs (1494–1576), Meistersinger, poet, playwright, and shoemaker
- Gerlinde Sämann (born 1969), soprano known for her performances in concerts and operas
- Martin Scherber (1907–1974), composer
- Ann-Helena Schlüter, pianist, organist, composer, and poet
- Alexander Schreiner (1901–1987), organist of the Salt Lake Tabernacle who wrote the music to several LDS hymns
- Johann Staden (1581–1634), Baroque organist and composer
- Anton Ferdinand Titz (1742–1811), composer, violinist, and viola d'amore player
- André Watts (1946–2023), pianist
- Hieronymus Weickmann (1824–1896), viola player and composer
- Leopold Widhalm (1722–1776), luthier
- Erwin Wohlfahrt (1932–1968), opera singer
- Dan Zimmermann (born 1966), drummer in the bands Gamma Ray and Freedom Call

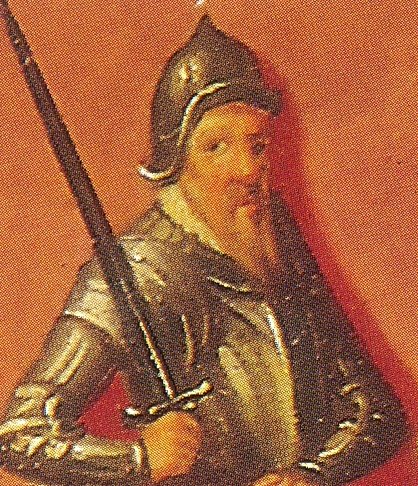
Frederick I, Elector of Brandenburg

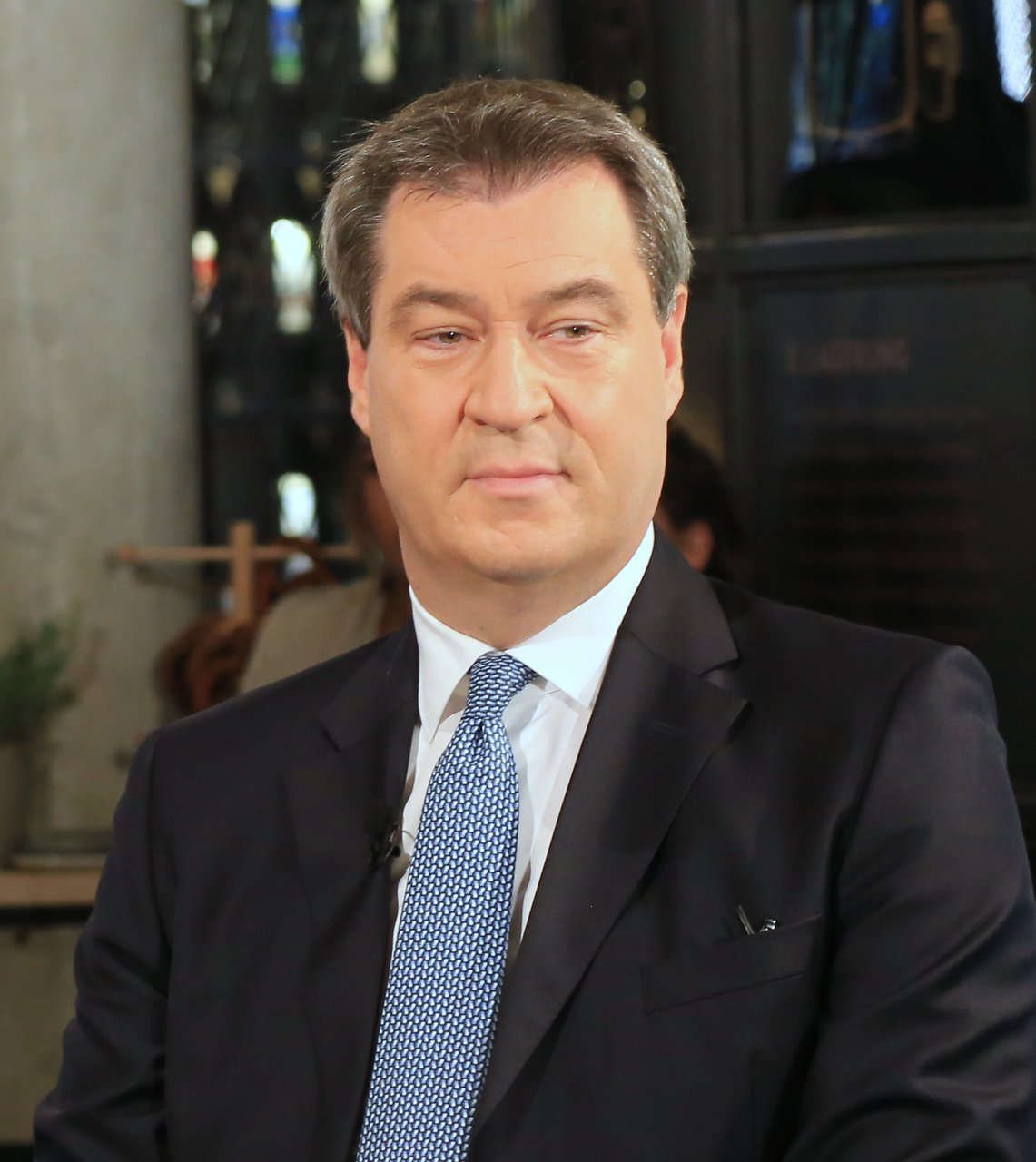
Markus Söder, 2018

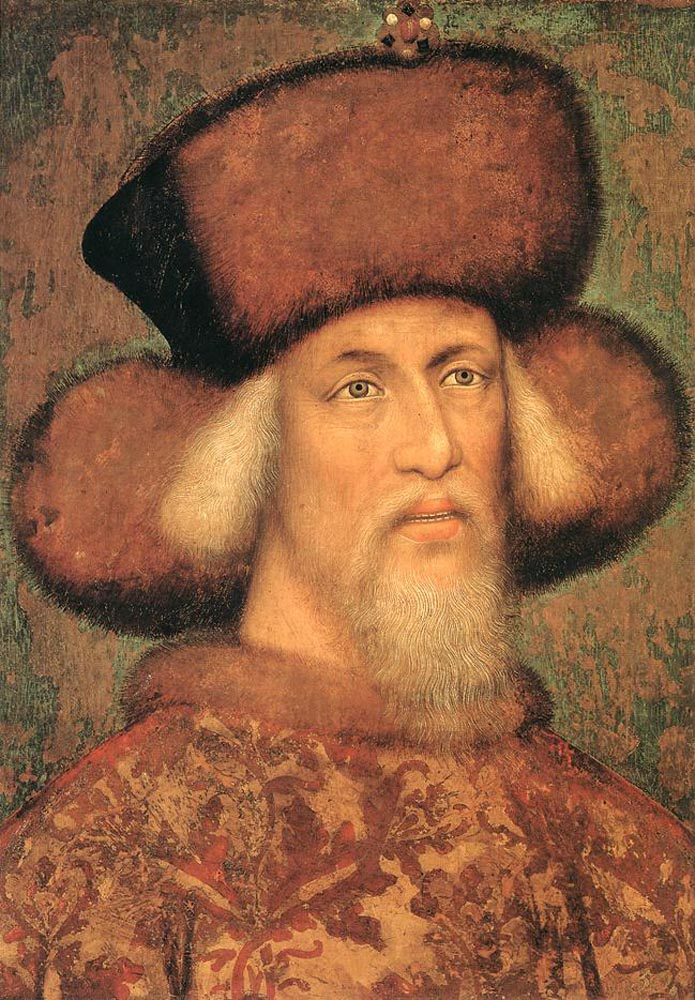
Sigismund, 1433

== Politics ==
- Hieronymus Baumgartner (1498–1565), Bürgermeister and a major contributor to the early Reformation.
- Günther Beckstein (born 1943), Minister-President of Bavaria, and head of Frederick V's government-in-exile in the Hague
- Conrad I (c. 1186–1261) Burgrave of Nuremberg from the House of Hohenzollern
- Conrad I of Raabs (died 1143), Burgrave of Nuremberg
- Conrad II of Raabs (c. 1125 – c. 1191), Burgrave of Nuremberg
- Rudolf Eberhard (1914–1998), member of the Landtag of Bavaria
- Hieronymus Wilhelm Ebner von Eschenbach
- Patricia Flor (born 1961), German diplomat
- Helene von Forster (1859–1923), women's rights activist and author
- Frederick I (1139–1200), the first Burgrave of Nuremberg from the House of Hohenzollern
- Frederick III (c. 1220–1297), Burgrave of Nuremberg from the House of Hohenzollern,
- Frederick IV (1287–1332), Burgrave of Nuremberg
- Frederick V (c. 1333–1398), Burgrave of Nuremberg
- Frederick I, Elector of Brandenburg (1371–1440), the last Burgrave of Nuremberg in 1397–1427
- Frederick IV, Count of Zollern (c. 1188 – c. 1255), Burgrave of Nuremberg
- Michael Frieser (born 1964), member of the German Bundestag
- Gottfried II of Raabs (died c. 1137), Burgrave of Nuremberg
- Gottfried III of Raabs (died c. 1160), Burgrave of Nuremberg
- Otto Gessler (1875–1955), mayor of Regensburg, mayor of Nuremberg, and German Minister of Defence
- Hermann Glaser (1928–2018), politically engaged cultural historian and commentator
- Karl Grönsfelder (1882–1964), Bavarian political activist and politician
- Nils Gründer (born 1997), politician of the Free Democratic Party and member of the German Bundestag
- Thomas Händel (born 1953), member of the European Parliament
- Marian Hastings (1675–1729), Scottish Jacobite supporter
- Katja Hessel (born 1972), member of the German Bundestag
- Karl Holz (1895–1945), Nazi Party politician
- Luc Jochimsen (born 1936), former television journalist and politician of The Left party.
- John I (c. 1279–1300), Burgrave of Nuremberg
- John II (c. 1309–1357), Burgrave of Nuremberg
- John III (c. 1369–1420), Burgrave of Nuremberg and Margrave of Brandenburg-Kulmbach
- Lisa Kalvelage (1923–2009), anti-war demonstrator during the Vietnam War
- Martin Kastler (born 1974), Member of the European Parliament
- Willy Liebel (1897–1945), Oberbürgermeister of Nuremberg (1933–1945)
- Christian Gottfried Lorsch (1773–1830), first civilian first mayor of Nuremberg after it incorporation into the Kingdom of Bavaria
- Kristine Lütke (born 1982), Member of the German Bundestag
- Margaret of Bohemia (1373–1410), Burgravine of Nuremberg
- Ulrich Maly (born 1960), Mayor of Nuremberg (2002–2020)
- Donald McEachin (1961–2022), U.S. House of Representatives, Virginia Senate, and Virginia House of Delegates
- Verena Osgyan (born 1971), member of the Bavarian Landtag
- Melanie Oßwald (born 1976), member of the German Bundestag
- Willibald Pirckheimer (1470–1530), Renaissance humanist, imperial counselor, and a member of the City Council of Nuremberg
- Jan Plobner (born 1992), member of the German Bundestag
- Heinz Raether (1909–1986), physicist and director of the Institute for Applied Physics at the University of Hamburg
- Hannelore Roedel (born 1957), member of the German Bundestag
- Ludwig Scholz (1937–2005), mayor of Nuremberg
- Martin Sichert (born 1980), member of the German Bundestag
- Sigismund, Holy Roman Emperor (1368–1437), King of Hungary, Croatia, Germany, Bohemia, and Italy; Holy Roman emperor from 1433 until 1437.
- Markus Söder (born 1967), Minister-President of Bavaria
- Käte Strobel (1907–1996), Federal Minister of Healthcare (1966–1969) and Federal Minister of Youth, Family and Health (1969–1972)
- Johannes Wagner (born 1991), member of the German Bundestag
- Bettina Borrmann Wells (born 1874), suffragette
- Wenceslaus IV of Bohemia (1361–1419), King of Bohemia and German King
- Tobias Winkler (born 1978), member of the German Bundestag
- Giora Yoseftal (1912–1962), Israeli Minister of Labour, Minister of Housing, and Minister of Development
- Hans Ziegler (1877–1957), founder of the founder of the Socialist Workers' Party of Germany and mayor of Nuremberg
- Hans Zimmermann (1906–1984), Nazi Party official

== Religion ==
- Johann Wilhelm Baier (1647–1695), theologian in the Lutheran scholastic tradition
- Christoph Birkmann (1703–1771), theologian and minister
- Veit Dietrich (1506–1549), Lutheran theologian, writer, and reformer.
- Eberhard I (died 1164), Archbishop of Salzburg, Austria.
- Christina Ebner (1277–1356), Dominican nun, writer and mystic
- August Engelhardt (1875–1919), founder of a sect of sun worshipers in German New Guinea
- Johann Funck (1518–1566), Lutheran theologian
- Johann Heß (1490–1547), Lutheran theologian and Protestant reformer
- Margareta Karthäuserin (mid 15th century), nun and scribe at the Dominican conven
- Adelheid Langmann (c. 1306–1375), nun known for her text, Revelations
- Katerina Lemmel (1466–1533), Birgittine nun and patrician businesswoman
- Georg Major (1502–1574), Lutheran theologian
- Hans Meiser (1881–1956), Protestant theologian, pastor, and the first Landesbischof of the Evangelical Lutheran Church in Bavaria.
- Gustav Philipp Mörl (1673–1750), theologian and librarian
- Johann Sigismund Mörl (1710–1791), theologian
- Maximilian Nagel (1747–1772), theologian
- Lucas Osiander the Elder (1534–1604), pastor of the Evangelical-Lutheran Church in Württemberg
- Poppo von Osterna (died 1266), ninth Grandmaster of the Teutonic Order
- Caritas Pirckheimer (1467–1532), abbess during the Reformation
- Johannes Pfefferkorn (1469–1523), Catholic theologian and convert from Judaism
- Gerhard von Rad (1901–1971), Old Testament scholar, Lutheran theologian, and professor at the University of Heidelberg
- Werner Radspieler (1939–2018), auxiliary bishop of the Roman Catholic Archdiocese of Bamberg
- Karl-Josef Rauber (1934–2023), cardinal and prelate of the Catholic Church
- Moritz Rosenhaupt (1841–1900), Jewish cantor and composer
- Sebaldus (11th century), the patron saint of Nuremberg
- Gottlieb Christoph Adolf von Harless (1806–1879), Lutheran theologian
- Hermann Josef Wehrle (1899–1944), Catholic priest

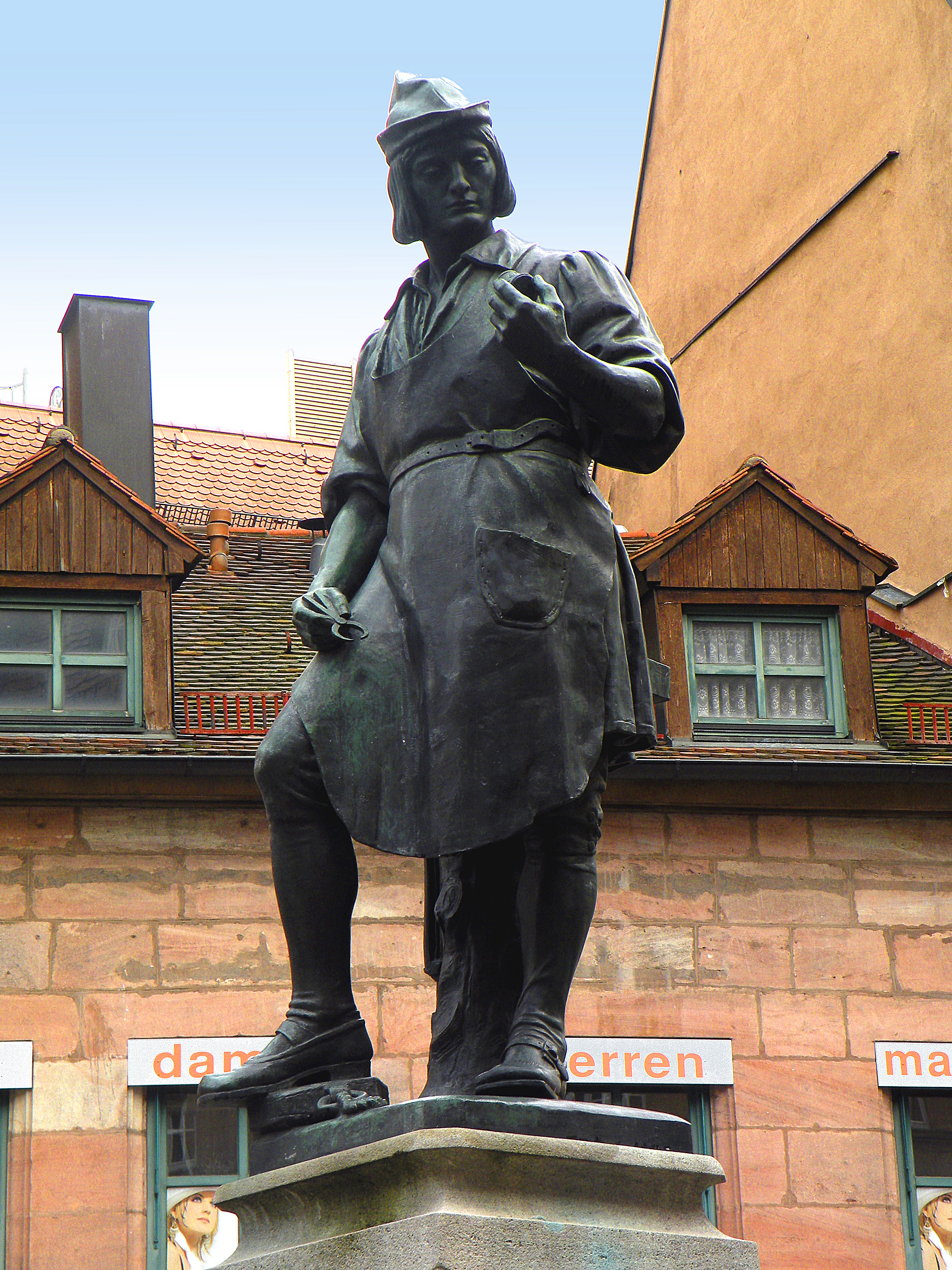
Peter Henlein

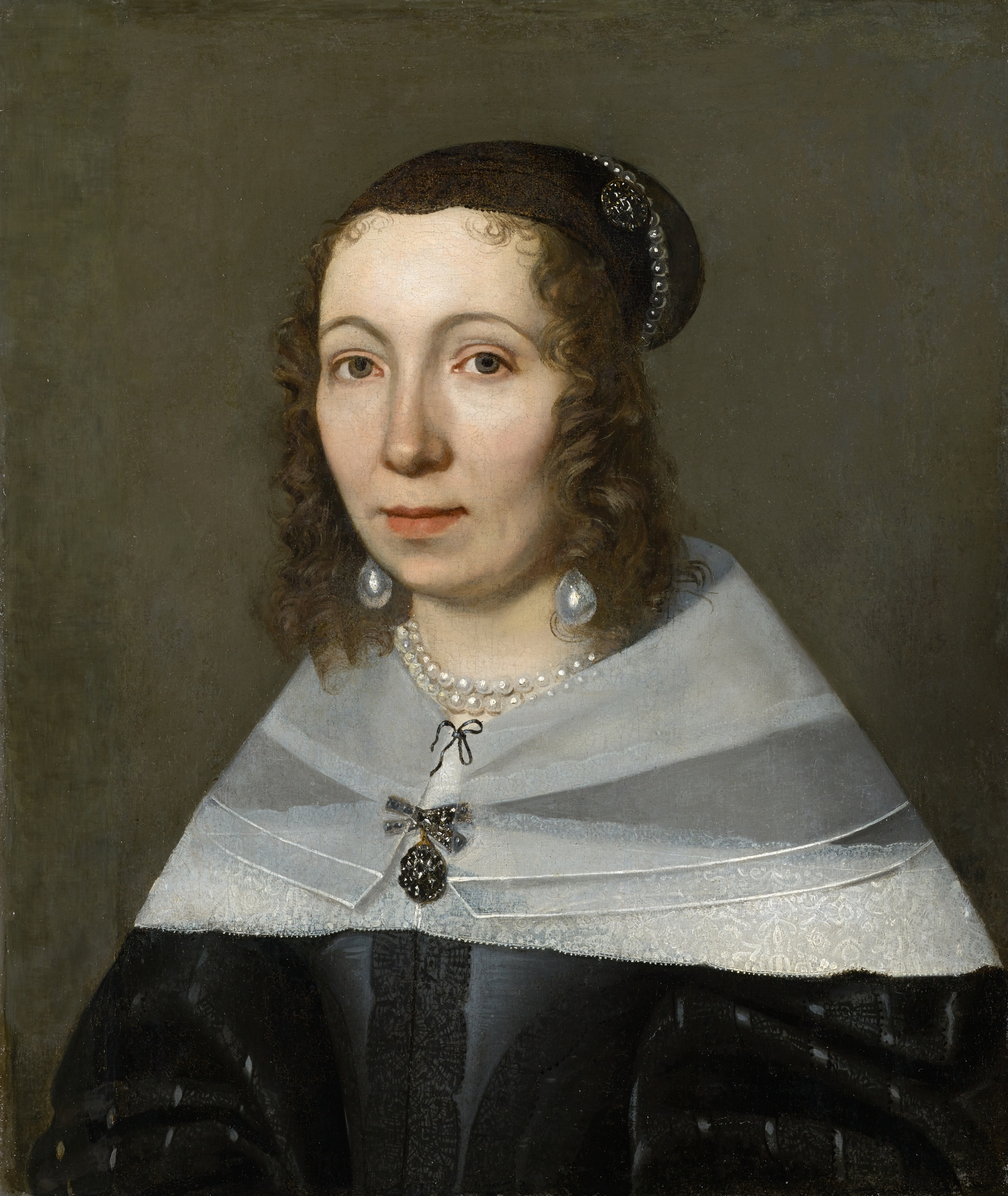
Maria Sibylla Merian, 1679

== Science ==
- Michael Adelbulner (1702–1779), physicist, mathematician, physician, and astronomer
- Karl Bechert (1901–1981), theoretical physicist in atomic physics and politician
- Ernst von Bibra (1806–1878), scientist, naturalist and author
- Maria Clara Eimmart (1676–1707), astronomer, engraver and designer
- Albert Fleischmann (1862–1942), zoologist
- Alfred Byrd Graf (1901–2001), botanist
- Ludwig Hopf (1884–1939), theoretical physicist
- Klaus Kalb (born 1942), lichenologist
- Maria Sibylla Merian (1647–1717), entomologist, naturalist and scientific illustrator
- Karl Michahelles (1807–1834), zoologist
- Franz Wilhelm Neger (1868–1923), botanist, mycologist and dendrologist
- Gertrude Neumark (1927–2010), physicist
- Johann Leonhard Rost (1688–1727), astronomer
- Johannes Roth (1815–1858), zoologist
- Hieronymus Schreiber (died 1547), mathematician and astronomer
- Meier Schwarz (1926–2022), plant physiologist
- Ernst Stromer (1871–1952), paleontologist
- Johann Wilhelm Sturm
- Suzanne Saueressig (1925–2013), first practicing female veterinarian in Missouri
- Kaspar Uttenhofer (1588–1621), astronomer
- Johann Christoph Volkamer (1644–1720), botanist and author
- Johann Georg Wagler (1800–1832), herpetologist and ornithologist
- Johann Andreas Wagner (1797–1861), palaeontologist, zoologist, and archaeologist
- Bernhard Walther (1430–1504), astronomer
- Johannes Werner (1468–1522), astronomer, mathematician, geography, and instrument maker
- Johann Wolf (1765–1824), naturalist and ornithologist
- Johann Philipp von Wurzelbauer (1651–1725), astronomer

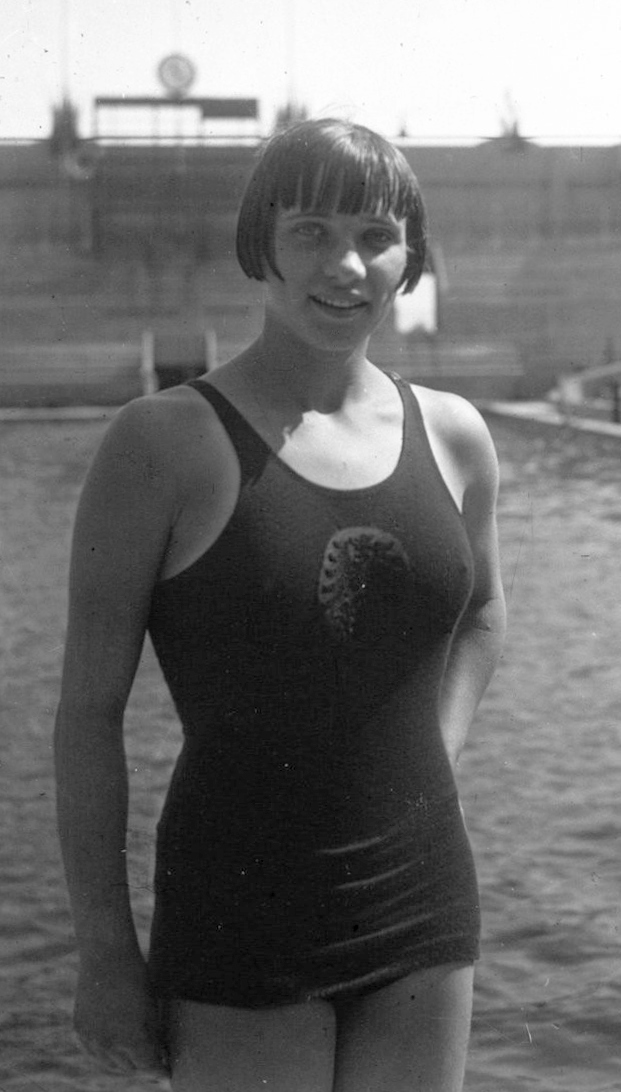
Olga Jensch-Jordan, 1931

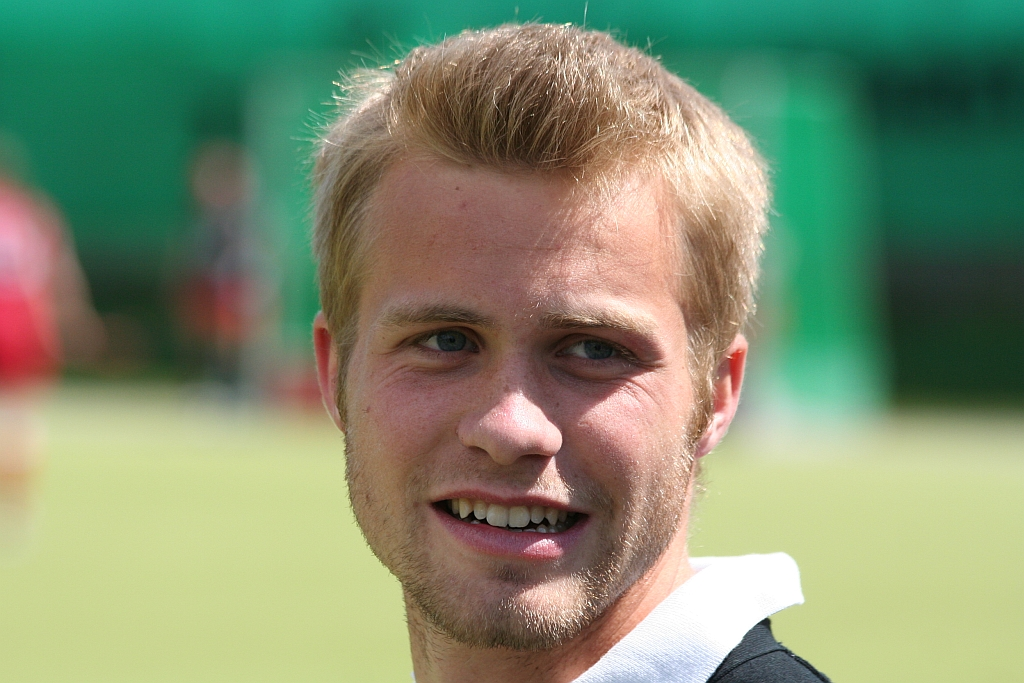
Maximilian Mueller, 2008

== Sports ==
- Kurt Albert (1954–2010), climber
- Tobias Dier (born 1976), professional golfer
- Harry Frei (born 1951), Australian rules footballer and cricketer
- Alfred Kornprobst (1940–1991), weightlifter who competed at the 1964 Summer Olympics
- Günther Meier (1941–2020), amateur boxer, bronze medalist at the 1968 Summer Olympics
- Nicole Roth (born 1995), professional handball player
- Sebastian Steudtner (born 1985), surfer
- Tobias Wadenka (born 1990), badminton player
- Julia Willand (born 1972), beach volleyball player
- Lisa Zimmermann (born 1996), freestyle skier who won the gold medal in slopestyle at the 2015 World Championships

=== Basketball ===
- Bastian Doreth (born 1989), professional basketball player
- Christopher McNaughton (born 1982), professional basketball player
- Kasha Terry (born 1983), professional basketball player

=== Chess ===
- Georg Klaus (1912–1974), chess player
- Ludwig Rödl (1907–1970), chess master

=== Cycling ===
- Willi Fuggerer (1941–2015), track cyclist who competed at the 1964 Summer Olympics
- Matthias Kessler (born 1979), professional road racing cyclist
- Karl Kittsteiner (1920–2011), racing cyclist who won the German National Road Race in 1946
- Friedrich von Löffelholz (1955–2017), cyclist who competed at the 1976 Summer Olympics
- Fritz Neuser (born 1932), cyclist who competed in the tandem sprint at the 1956 Summer Olympics
- Gerhard Scheller (born 1958), cyclist who competed at the 1984 Summer Olympics
- Georg Umbenhauer (1912–1970), racing cyclist who won the German National Road Race in 1936
- Georg Voggenreiter (1912–1986), racing cyclist who won the German National Road Race in 1947

=== Field Hockey ===
- Hermann End (born 1942), field hockey player who competed at the 1968 Summer Olympics
- Wolfgang End (1939–2008), field hockey player who competed at the 1960 Summer Olympics
- Nina Hasselmann (born 1986), field hockey player who competed at the 2012 Summer Olympics
- Hannah Krüger (born 1988), field hockey player who competed at the 2016 Summer Olympics
- Maximilian Müller (born 1987), field hockey player, gold medalist at the 2008 and 2012 Summer Olympics
- Norbert Schuler (born 1938), field hockey player who competed at the 1960 Summer Olympics and the 1968 Summer Olympics
- Justus Weigand (born 2000), field hockey player
- Christopher Wesley (born 1987), field hockey player who competed at the 2012 Summer Olympics

=== Football (American) ===
- Bruce Collie (born 1962), professional player in the National Football League
- Dominik Eberle (born 1996), National Football League player

=== Gymnastics ===
- Friedl Iby (1905–1960) gymnast who competed in the 1936 Summer Olympics
- Elisabeth Ostermeyer (born 1929), gymnast who competed at the 1952 Summer Olympics
- Hans Pfann (1920–2021), gymnast who competed at the 1952 and 1956 Summer Olympics
- Irma Walther (1920–2005), gymnast who competed at the 1952 Summer Olympics
- Lydia Zeitlhofer (1931–2019), gymnast who competed at the 1952 Summer Olympics

=== Martial Arts and Taekwondo ===
- Jessin Ayari (born 1992), mixed martial arts fighter and former Superior Fighting Championship Welterweight Champion
- Rabia Gülec (born 1994), taekwondo athlete who represented Germany at the 2016 Summer Olympics
- Sümeyye Manz (born 1989), taekwondo practitioner who won the gold medal at the 2008 European Taekwondo Championships and represented Germany at the 2008 Olympics and 2012 Olympics
- Servet Tazegül (born 1988), taekwondo practitioner who won the bronze medal at the 2008 Summer Olympics

=== Racing ===
- Hermann Böhm (1916–1983), motorcycle racer.
- Fritz Riess (1922–1991), racing driver
- Tobias Siegert (born 1991), Grand Prix motorcycle racer

=== Shooting ===
- Heinrich Gollwitzer (born 1923), sports shooter who competed at the 1960 Summer Olympics
- Heinz Mertel (born 1936), sport shooter who competed at the 1968, 1972 and 1976 Summer Olympics

=== Skating ===
- Florian Just (born 1982), pair skater
- Norbert Schramm (born 1960), figure skater
- Freimut Stein (1924–1986), figure skater who competed at the 1952 Winter Olympics
- Markus Tröger (born 1966), speed skater who competed at the 1992 Winter Olympics

=== Soccer (football) ===
- Deniz Aytekin (born 1978), football referee
- Willi Billmann (1911–2001), footballer and member of the Germany national football team
- Ekin Çelebi (born 2000), professional footballer
- Marco Christ (born 1980), professional footballer
- Şamil Çinaz (born 1986), professional.footballer
- Benjamin Cortus (born 1981), football referee
- Dominik Eberle (born 1996), football player
- Karl-Heinz Ferschl (1944–2023), professional footballer
- Georg Friedel (1913–1987), professional footballer
- Benjamin Fuchs (born 1983), professional footballer
- Vanessa Fudalla (born 2001), professional footballer
- Sebastian Gärtner (born 1993), professional footballer
- Jann George (born 1992), professional footballer
- Peter Geyer (born 1952), professional footballer
- Argiris Giannikis (born 1980), professional football manager
- Madeleine Giske (born 1987), professional footballer
- Günther Glomb (1930–2015), football manager and head coach of the Thailand national football team
- Gottlieb Göller (1935–2004), professional footballer and manager
- Michael Görlitz (born 1987), professional footballer
- Isabella Hartig (born 1997), professional footballer
- Georg Hochgesang (1897–1988), professional footballer and manager
- Arijon Ibrahimović (born 2005), professional footballer
- Helmut Jahn (1917–1986), professional footballer
- Hans Kalb (1899–1945), professional footballer
- Joannis Karsanidis (born 1993), professional footballer
- Alexandros Kartalis (born 1995), professional footballer
- Manfred Kastl (born 1965), professional footballer
- Georg Köhl (born 1995), professional footballer
- Michael Krämer (born 1985), footballer
- Frans Krätzig (born 2003), professional footballer
- Willi Kund (1908–1967), footballer
- Nastassja Lein (born 2001), professional footballer
- Ludwig Leinberger (1903–1943), footballer who was part of Germany's team at the 1928 Summer Olympics
- Horst Leupold (born 1942), professional footballer
- Jamie Leweling (born 2001), professional footballer
- Julian Löschner (born 1996), professional footballer
- Alberto Méndez (born 1974), professional footballer
- Max Morlock (1925–1994), professional footballer
- Andreas Munkert (1908–1982), footballer
- Marc Oechler (born 1968), professional footballer
- Richard Oehm (1909–1975), professional footballer
- Adnan Osmanović (born 1997), professional footballer
- Chhunly Pagenburg (born 1986), professional footballer
- Christiane Pape (born 1960), para table tennis player who won seven medals in world championships
- Peter Perchtold (born 1984), professional footballer and coach
- Nils Piwernetz (born 2000), professional footballer
- Fritz Popp (born 1940), professional footballer
- Luitpold Popp (1893–1968), professional footballer
- Marco Rapp (born 1991), professional footballer
- David Raum (born 1998), professional footballer
- Sercan Sararer (born 1989), professional footballer
- Josef Schmitt (1908–1980), professional footballer and member of Germany's team at the 1928 Summer Olympics
- Patrick Schönfeld (born 1989), professional footballer
- Leonhard Seiderer (1895–1940), professional footballer
- Wolfgang Strobel (1896–1945), professional footballer
- Heinrich Stuhlfauth (1896–1966), footballer and member of Germany's team at the 1928 Summer Olympics
- Hans Sutor (1895–1976), professional footballer
- Sebastian Szikal (born 1986), professional footballer
- Malik Tillman (born 2002), professional footballer
- Timothy Tillman (born 1999), professional soccer player
- Heinrich Träg (1893–1976), professional footballer
- Frank Türr (born 1970), professional footballer
- Enrico Valentini (born 1989), professional footballer
- Daniel Wagner (born 1987), professional footballer
- Ferdinand Wenauer (1939–1992), professional footballer
- Marcel Wenig (born 2004), professional footballer
- Julian Wießmeier (born 1992), professional footballer
- Tasso Wild (born 1940), professional footballer
- Mike Windischmann (born 1965), professional footballer
- Aycan Yanaç (born 1988), professional footballer

=== Ice Hockey ===
- Gerrit Fauser (born 1989), professional ice hockey player
- Bernd Herzig (born 1941), ice hockey player who competed at the 1964 Winter Olympics
- Marius Möchel (born 1991), professional ice hockey player
- Lukas Reichel (born 2002), professional ice hockey player
- Niklas Treutle (born 1991), professional ice hockey player
- Sven Ziegler (born 1994), professional ice hockey player

=== Swimming and diving ===
- Gerda Daumerlang (1920–2006), diver who competed in the 1936 Summer Olympics
- Daniela Götz (born 1987), swimmer who won a bronze medal at the 2004 Summer Olympics
- Suse Heinze (1920–2018), diver who competed in the 1936 Summer Olympics
- Olga Jensch-Jordan (1913–2000), springboard diver
- Amina Kajtaz (born 1996), swimmer who competed in the women's 100-metre butterfly at the 2016 Summer Olympics
- Hermann Lotter (1940–2013), swimmer who competed in the 1960 Summer Olympics and the 1964 Summer Olympics
- Teresa Rohmann (born 1987), medley swimmer who competed at the 2004 Summer Olympics
- Hannah Stockbauer (born 1982), swimmer and bronze medalist at the 2004 Summer Olympics

=== Tennis ===
- Johannes Härteis (born 1996), professional tennis player
- Robin Kern (born 1993), professional tennis player
- Maximilian Marterer (born 1995), professional tennis player
- Hans Nüsslein (1910–1991), tennis player and coach
- Wiltrud Probst (born 1969), professional tennis player
- Jurij Rodionov (born 1999), professional tennis player
- Nicole Vaidišová (born 1989), professional tennis player
- Nina Zander (born 1990), professional tennis player

=== Track and field ===
- Inge Bausenwein (1920–2008), competed in the women's javelin throw at the 1952 Summer Olympics
- Christian Haas (born 1958), sprinter who specialized in the 100 metres
- Hugo Leistner (1902–2002), hurdler who won the NCAA championship in the 120 yd hurdles in 1925

=== Wrestling ===
- Absolute Andy (born 1983), professional wrestler
- Georg Gerstäcker (1889–1949), wrestler who competed at the 1912 Summer Olympics
- Kurt Leucht (1903–1974), Greco-Roman wrestler won a gold medal at the 1928 Summer Olympics
- Tim Schleicher (born 1988), freestyle wrestler who competed at the 2012 Summer Olympics
- Alex Wright (born 1975), professional wrestler

=== Other ===
- Abraham Grünbaum (activist), German Jewish activist.
- Leonhard Mahlein (1921–1985), trade union leader

== See also ==
- Burgraviate of Nuremberg
- List of mayors of Nuremberg
