= Strehl =

Strehl is a surname. Notable people with this surname include:

- Alexander Strehl, German academic and computer scientist
- Carl Strehl (1886–1971), German teacher
- Christoph Strehl (born 1968), German tenor
- Heinz Strehl (1938–1986), German footballer
- Karl Strehl (1864–1940), German physicist and mathematician
