= Gröschel =

Gröschel is a German family name. Notable people with the name include:

- Benedict Groeschel (1933–2014), American Catholic priest
- Bernhard Gröschel (1939–2009), German linguist and slavist
- Cornelia Gröschel (born 1987), German actress
- Craig Groeschel (born 1967), American Methodist pastor
- Ernst Gröschel (1918–2000), German pianist
