= Martin Vossiek =

German electrical engineer and professor

- Born: Germany
- Education: Ruhr University Bochum (Dipl.-Ing., Dr.-Ing.)
- Known for: Radar-based sensing, wireless positioning systems
- Awards: IEEE Fellow; IEEE MTT-S Microwave Application Award (2019)
- Scientific career
- Fields: Microwave engineering, radar systems, wireless localization
- Institutions: Friedrich-Alexander-Universität Erlangen-Nürnberg; TU Clausthal; Siemens AG
- Website: https://www.lhft.eei.fau.de

Martin Vossiek is a German electrical engineer and professor specializing in microwave engineering, radar systems, and wireless positioning systems. He is a Full Professor (W3) and Chair of Microwaves and Photonics (Lehrstuhl für Hochfrequenztechnik, LHFT) at the Friedrich-Alexander-Universität Erlangen-Nürnberg (FAU), Germany.

He is a Fellow of the Institute of Electrical and Electronics Engineers (IEEE) and a recipient of the IEEE Microwave Theory and Techniques Society Microwave Application Award (2019).

== Education and early career ==
Vossiek studied electrical engineering at Ruhr University Bochum, where he received the Diplom-Ingenieur degree and subsequently the Doctor of Engineering (Dr.-Ing.) degree.

From 1991 to 2003, he worked as a research engineer at Siemens Corporate Technology in Munich, including serving as head of the Microwave Systems Group from 2000 to 2003.

== Academic career ==
In 2003, Vossiek was appointed professor of measurement technology at TU Clausthal, where he also served as Director of the Institute of Electrical Information Technology.

Since 2011, he has held the position of W3 Professor and Chair of Microwaves and Photonics (LHFT) at Friedrich-Alexander-Universität Erlangen-Nürnberg.

== Research ==
Vossiek's research focuses on radar and microwave systems, wireless localization, sensor networks, and imaging methods, with applications in automotive radar, industrial measurement technology, biomedical sensing, and autonomous systems.

He has authored and co-authored several hundred scientific publications and is named as an inventor on nearly one hundred granted patents.

== Service and leadership ==
=== Scientific governance ===
Vossiek serves as Speaker of the DFG Review Board 4.42 “Electrical Engineering and Information Technology”.

He is a spokesperson of the DFG Collaborative Research Centre SFB 1483 “Empathokinästhetische Sensorik (EmpkinS)”.

He is also co-spokesperson of the DFG Research Training Group RTG 2680 “KoRaTo”.

Since 2025, he has served as co-spokesperson of the DFG Research Unit FOR 5727 “3D-HF-MID”.

=== Editorial and conference activities ===
Vossiek has served as associate editor-in-chief of IEEE Transactions on Radar Systems since 2022.

From 2013 to 2019, he was associate editor of IEEE Transactions on Microwave Theory and Techniques.

He has held leading organizational roles at major international conferences, including Chair of the European Radar Conference (2017), Chair of the IEEE MTT-S International Conference on Microwaves for Intelligent Mobility (2018), Chair of the German Microwave Conference (2015), and Treasurer of European Microwave Week 2023.

=== Professional memberships ===
Vossiek is a Fellow of the IEEE. He is also a member of the German National Academy of Science and Engineering (acatech).

== Innovation and technology transfer ==
Research conducted at LHFT has contributed to the creation of several technology-oriented start-up companies.

These include Golden Devices GmbH, which develops additively manufactured high-frequency antennas and RF components;

fiveD GmbH, which focuses on radar simulation, digital radar twins, and AI-based radar methods;

and Pelora GmbH, which develops Bluetooth-based high-precision indoor localization systems.

== Honors and awards ==
- IEEE Fellow.
- IEEE Microwave Theory and Techniques Society Microwave Application Award (2019).

== Identifiers ==
- ORCID 0000-0002-8369-345X
