= Conrad Tockler =

German academic (1470–1530)

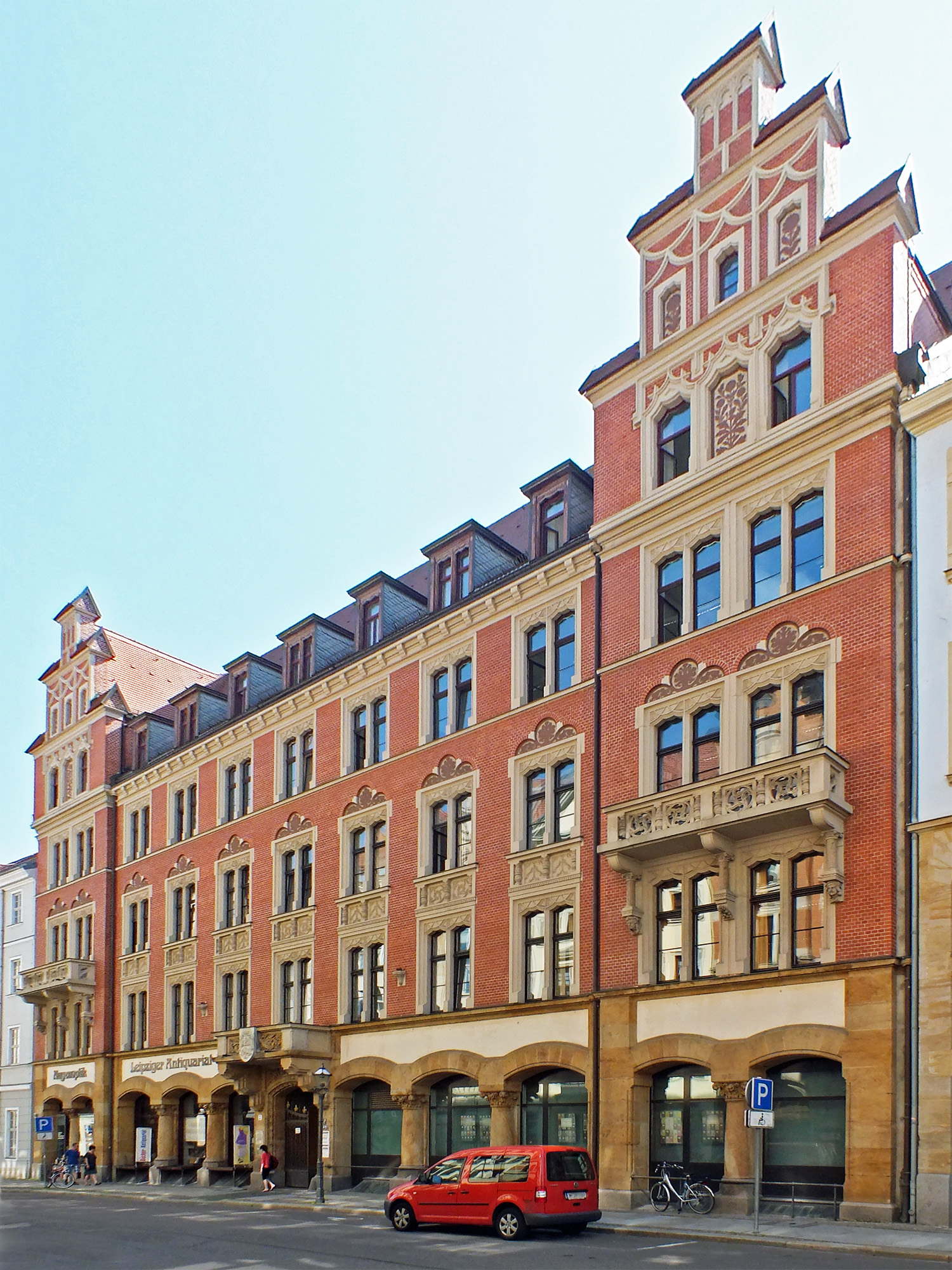
The Red College or New College at Leipzig University was established in the 16th century.

Conrad Tockler (1470–1530) is best known for being a writer, physician, and professor.

== Introduction ==
Conrad Tockler was born in Nuremberg, Germany, to a wealthy family. Coming from an affluent family, Tockler was able to attend Leipzig University at age 13.

== Biography ==
The works and teachings of Tockler mainly focus on medicine, mathematics, and astrology. He began his academic journey at Leipzig University where he obtained a master's degree in 1502. He continued his education at Leipzig to earn a medical degree in 1510. His journey at Leipzig was over as a student, but he accepted a job as a professor which would lead to him spending the rest of his life there. Conrad lectured almost every semester during the time between earning his master's degree and Medical degree.

== Academia ==
During those years his lectures were on the quadrivium which included the four disciplines: geometry, music, astronomy, and arithmetic. While being a professor at Leipzig, he also worked with the nearby print shops. The relationship with the print shops started out by him working to get his students textbooks. This led Tockler to print his own commentaries. His first commented reprint was the Libellus de sole, originally by Marsilius Ficinus. He then made two different commented reprints of the Tractatus de sphaera by Johannes de Sacrobosco. He published two of his own completely original works about the rules of using table and circular diagrams to depict operations related to making calendars. The publication of these works on using visual aids to depict calendrical events, led to Tockler publishing his own annual calendar. After his works were published at Leipzig, print shops in his home town of Nuremberg started to make copies of his calendars.

After his success in publishing Tockler was appointed Rector magnificus of Leipzig University in 1512, which is the highest position at a German university. This is equivalent to the President of a university in the United States. Although it seemed like everything was going perfectly for Tockler, he had a dark secret that would eventually catch up to him. In 1518, he was forced to resign due to apparent drug abuse. This was not the end of his career at Leipzig University due to favorable relations with Duke George of Saxony. He would never return to the prestigious rank of Rector magnificus, but he would be able to return as a professor with the backing of Duke George. He would stay at the position of professor at Leipzig University until his death in 1530. He did not have any living inheritor to take possession of his wealth or belongings. On Tockler's death, Duke George took control of his assets and used them to open up the third chair for medicine at Leipzig University, which was named Tockleriana in remembrance of the late professor until the eighteenth century.

== Teaching ==
Even though music was not considered as important as other subjects, Tockler decided to still teach it for his first couple of years. In a typical year, he taught geometry to his students for half or three-quarters of the time. Additionally, he taught mathematical optics for 12 to 14 weeks, and he taught music for 3 to 4 weeks. He taught astronomy, including cosmology, for 5 to 6 weeks, and he taught arithmetic for 3 to 4 weeks. Almost every semester, Tockler talked to his students about Euclid's works.

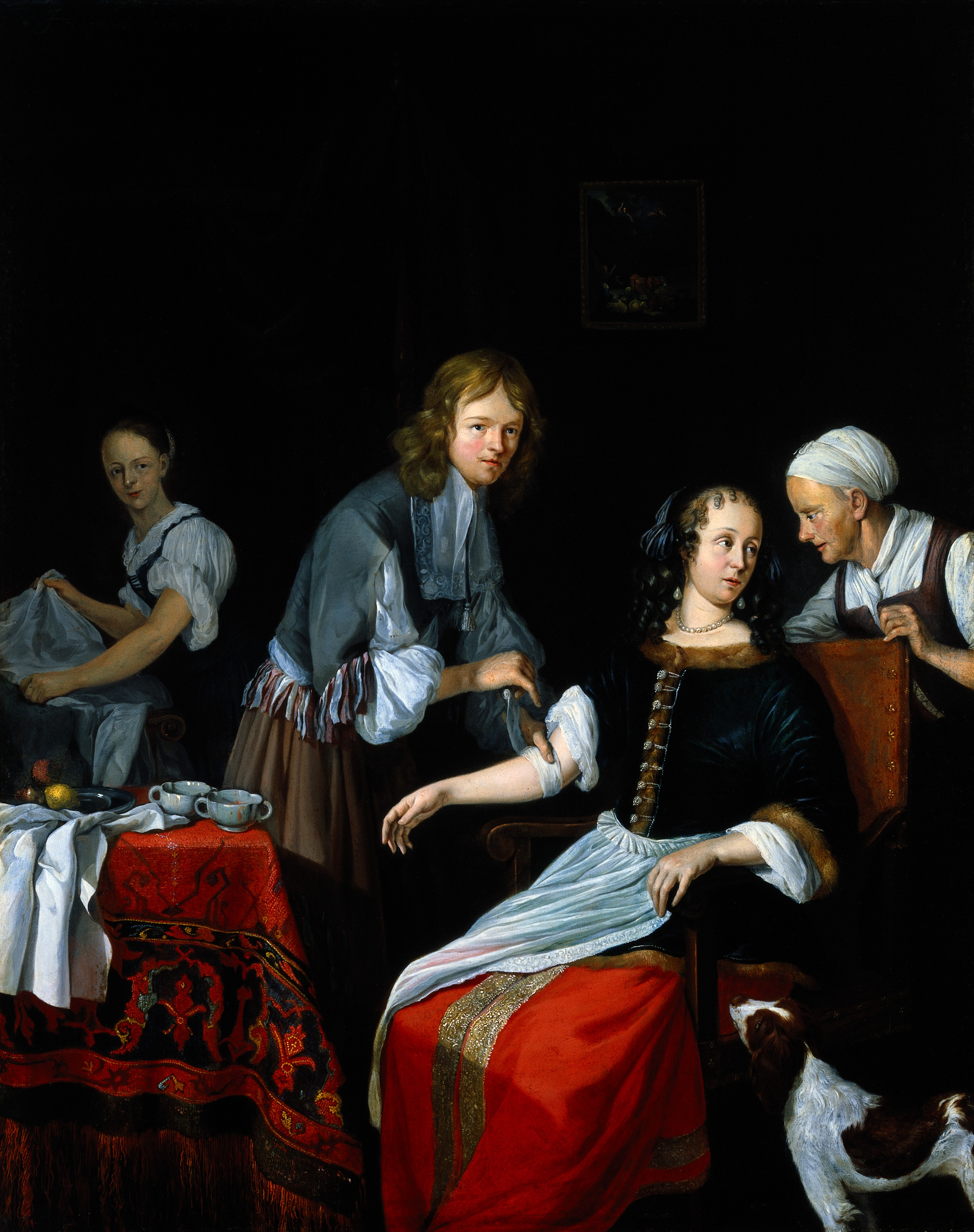
Bloodletting is bleeding people to maintain their health.

== Works ==
As already mentioned Tockler was the author of many almanacs in German published in Leipzig and Nuremberg. These almanacs' main purpose was to explain the dates of the important ceremonial festivals. Another purpose of these books was to help individuals make decisions about their well-being, such as through bloodletting, which was a common practice. Tockler's books gave advice for every day. He wrote an almanac for Leipzig in 1507 that began by explaining how to read an almanac. Every day of the year had a corresponding symbol in this almanac. There was also a symbol for each phase of the moon, and for recommended bloodletting on each day, which might be none or a moderate amount. Tockler's almanacs were written in Latin but translated into other languages, such as German and Czech, for the benefit of numerous immigrants to Germany who spoke Czech.

Both their publication in two different places and their translation into several languages testify to Tockler's contemporary recognition. Based on the success of his publications, his status in Leipzig seems to have been highest between 1503 and 1514. His works showed that he was highly competent in mathematics and astronomy, although he also focused on medicine and astrology in many of his works. Combining these interests, his almanacs show that his favorite field was astrological medicine.

Tockler made a commentary on Perspectiva communis. This book, written by John Peckham, was about optics. Tockler's commentary included colored diagrams and used Iamblichus Platonicus's studies on optics to guide his commentary. Sometime later, Tockler published two textbooks on arithmetic, which had changed a lot in the late Middle Ages, and Tockler's textbooks helped introduce what is today called number theory.
