= Sebastian Ochsenkun =

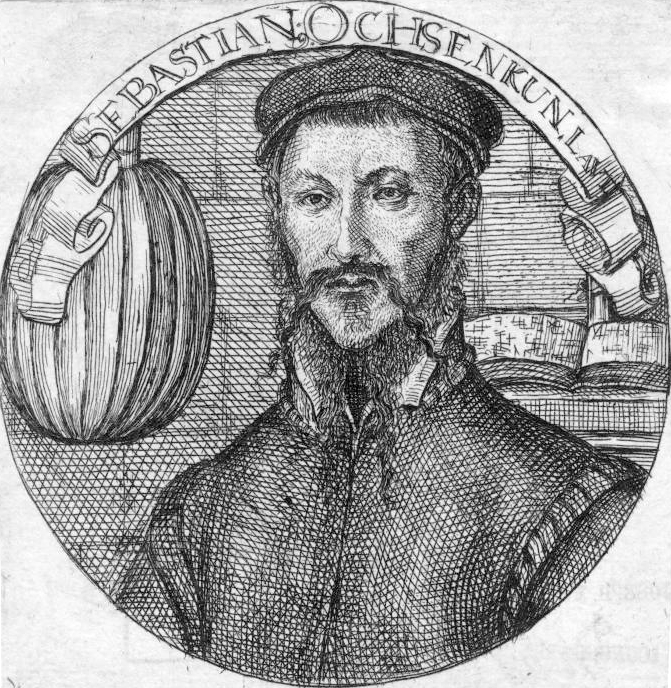
Sebastian Ochsenkun

Sebastian Ochsenkun, known also as Sebastian Ochsenkhun (born 6 February 1521 in Nuernberg; † 20 August 1574 in Heidelberg), was a German Lutenist and composer.

== Life ==
Ochsenkun‘s father was a barber who also made cornets. He was a student of Hans Vogel.

He was lutenist at the court of Otto Henry in Pfalz-Neuburg before moving on practice at the court of Heidelberg when Otto Henry became Elector Palatine of Heidelberg. In 1558 Ochsenkun published, in a volume dedicated to Otto Henry, a collection of songs and motets titled Tabulaturbuch auff die Lauten that contained works from the musical collection of the court of Heidelberg. He was also entrusted with official functions in Heidelberg: as flour weigher he was responsible for the validation of all flour traded in Heidelberg.

His sons Friedrich and Christoph both studied at the Heidelberg University.

He is buried next to his wife, Sibylla Sebastiani Ochsenkuntz, who died September 1571.

== Works ==
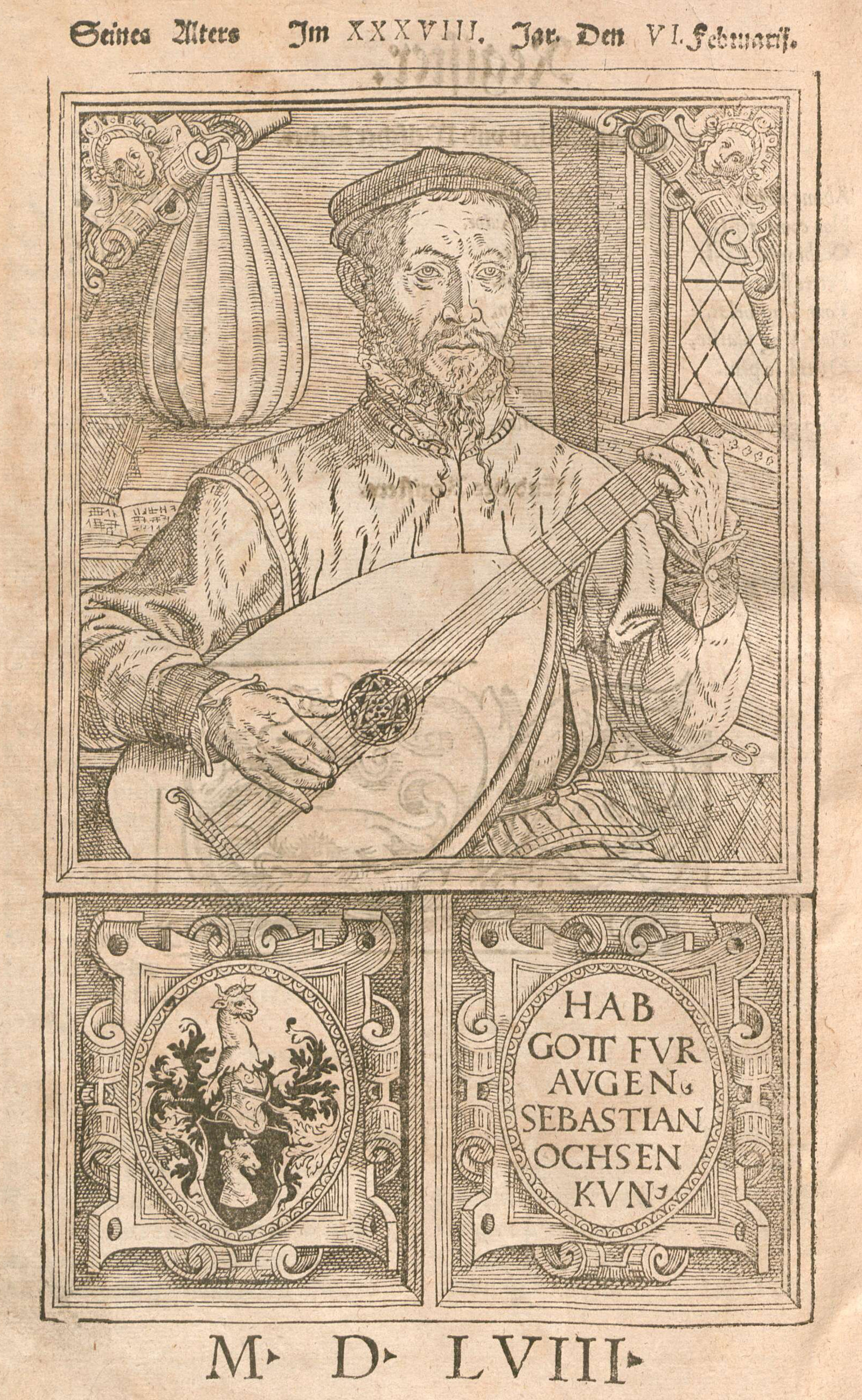
Sebastian Ochsenkun, Cover of his book Tabulaturbuch auff die Lauten, 1558

- Tabulaturbuch auff die Lauten […]. Durch Sebastian Ochsenkhun […]. Johann Khol, Heidelberg 1558 (Badische Landesbibliothek Karlsruhe). Faksimile: Tree-Edition, München 2002, DNB-IDN 358610796
- A second tablature for lute published by Joannem Maier in 1564 has been lost.

== Literature ==
- Alfred Baumgartner (1989), Propyläen Welt der Musik – Die Komponisten: Ein Lexikon in fünf Bänden (in German), vol. 4, Berlin: Propyläen Verlag, p. 191, ISBN 3-549-07830-7
- Bergquest, Stephen A. (2019). "Four Centuries of String Players in Portrait Prints". Music in Art: International Journal for Music Iconography. 44 (1–2): 181–202. ISSN 1522-7464.
- Johannes Klier: „Hab Gott für augen“. Sebastian Ochsenkun (1521–1574). In: Gitarre & Laute, 2, 1980, Nr. 1, S. 34–40.
