= Kaspar Uttenhofer =

German astronomer (1588 –1621)

- Born: 1588
- Died: May 3, 1621 (aged 32–33)
- Occupation: astronomer

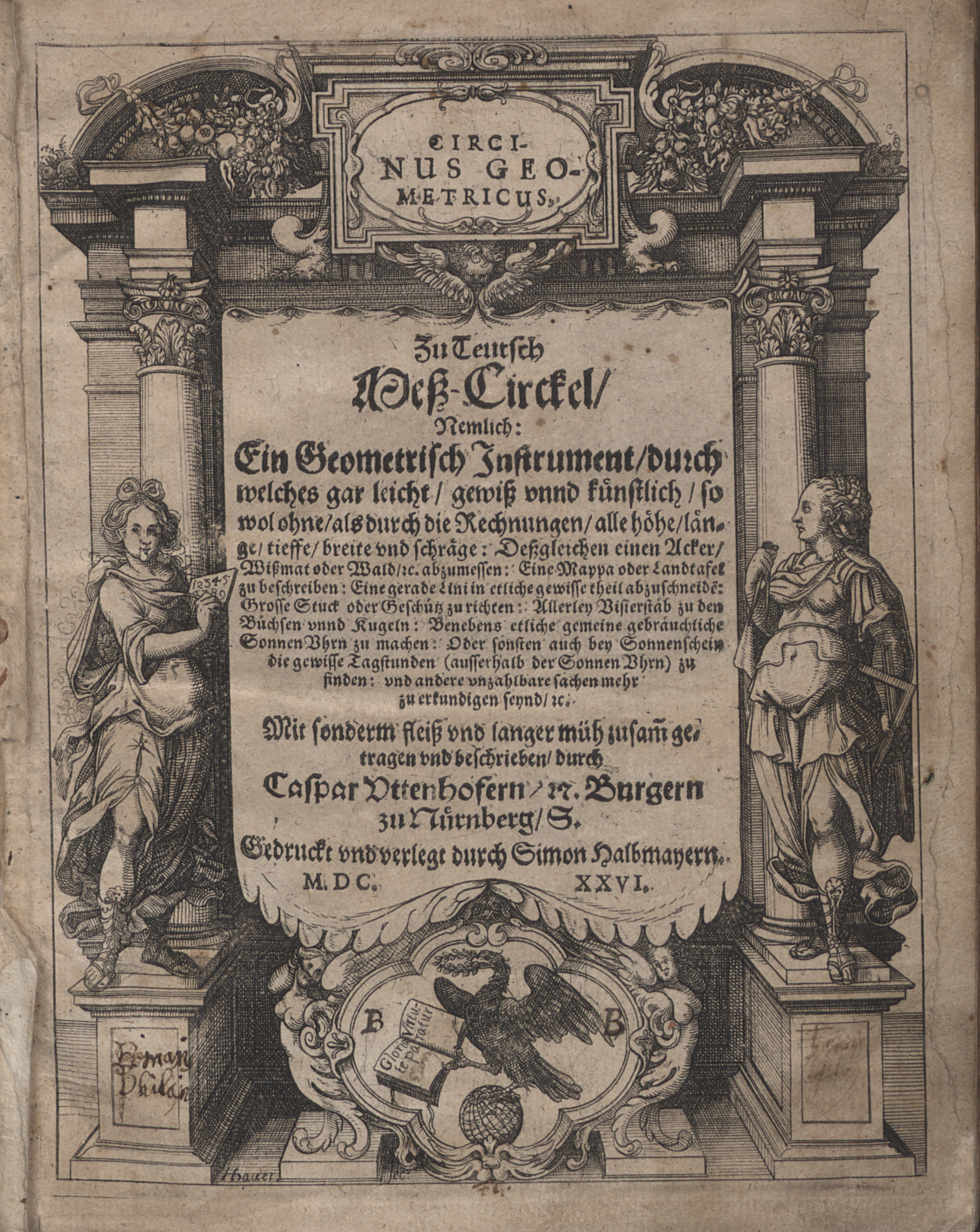
Circinus geometricus zu Teutsch Mess-Circkel, 1626

Kaspar Uttenhofer (1588 – 31 May 1621) was a German astronomer. He wrote various books, the most renowned is the Pes mechanicus in which the author explained how to easily build a sundial.

== Life ==
Kaspar Uttenhofer was born in Nuremberg in 1588, the seventh son of the second marriage of Georg Uttenhofer, a tailor. His father died on January 9, 1563, leaving the family in good economic conditions. One of his brothers was Anthoni Uttenhofer (1542-1609), an artist specialized in etching.

Little is known about his personal life other than he was self-taught. According to the mathematician Daniel Schwenter, Uttenhofer devoted most of his life to improving his knowledge.

Uttenhofer wrote various books, the most renowned is probably the Pes mechanicus in which the author explained how to easily build a sundial. He also wrote the Judicium de nupero Cometa astrologico-historicum after spotting comet (C/1618 W1) in the constellation Boötes.

He died in his home city of Nuremberg in 1621.

== Selected works ==
- Pes Mechanicus. Oder Werckschuh/ Das ist: Ein gar leuchte Weise/ allerley gemeine Sonnen-Uhren auß einem außgetheilten Werckschuch zu machen Nürnberg: Halbmayer, 1615
- Judicium de nupero Cometa Astrologo Historicum. Kurzer Bericht und Erklärung / Was von dem neuen Cometen / oder geschwentzten Stern / so sich dieses zu endlauffenden 1618. Jars [...]zuhalten. Nürnberg: Simon Halbmayer, 1619
- Circinus geometricus zu Teutsch Mess-Circkel (in German). Nürmberg: Simon Halbmayern. 1626.
