= Manfred Rühl =

German communication scientist (1933–2026)

Manfred Rühl (31 December 1933 – 5 August 2026) was a German communication scientist with a social science background.

== Early life and education ==
Manfred Rühl was born in Nuremberg on 31 December 1933. At the age of sixteen he received a high school scholarship for Dayton, Ohio, for the 1950/51 school year. After graduating from high school (1953 in Nuremberg), he completed an apprenticeship as an industrial clerk. He became a freelance journalist for daily newspapers, magazines and radio, and studied economics and social sciences at the University of Erlangen, Free University of Berlin, and Hochschule für Wirtschafts- und Sozialwissenschaften Nürnberg, where he graduated in economics in 1960. His theses topic was "Der Stürmer und sein Herausgeber" (Der Stürmer and its editor). From 1960 to 1962 he was a student assistant at the "Institut für Publizistik" (Institute for Public Communication).

He served as faculty assistant at the Nürnberg Hochschule's transition to the University of Erlangen–Nuremberg's Faculty of Economics and Social Science. From 1964 to 1968 he worked as a scientific assistant for communication science at the (new) Chair of Political and Communication Science. He received a doctorate in 1968 with his dissertation "Die Zeitungsredaktion als organisiertes soziales System" (The newsroom as an organized social system) under Franz Ronneberger.

== Career ==
In 1969/70, Rühl was scholar-in-residence at the Annenberg School of Communications of the University of Pennsylvania. From 1970 to 1976, he was a project manager in the DFG Collaborative Research Centre 22 "Sozialisations-und Kommunikationsforschung" (Socialisation and Communication Research) at the University of Erlangen–Nuremberg. In between, from 1973 to 1974, he held the Interim Professorship for Journalistics at the Johannes Gutenberg University Mainz. In 1976, he was appointed to the (new) Professorship of Communication Science at the University of Hohenheim, where he was responsible for the postgraduate course in journalism.

In 1978, he obtained his Habilitation, the postdoctoral lecturing qualification in Communication Science at the University of Erlangen–Nuremberg with the theses "Journalismus und Gesellschaft. Bestandsaufnahme und Theorieentwurf" (Journalism and Society. Inventory and theory draft). From 1983 to 1999, he held the (new) Chair of Communication Science at the University of Bamberg. In summer 1980 and winter 1993/94, he was visiting professor for public communication at the University of Zürich. In 1999 he became professor emeritus.

In 1963, Rühl was one of the founding members of "Deutsche Gesellschaft für Publizistik- und Kommunikationswissenschaft" (DGPuK), the German Communication Association, and since 2004 he has been one of its honorary members. From 1978 to 1982, he was Chairman and Deputy Chairman of DGPuK. In 1970 he became a member of the International Communication Association (ICA); from 1977 to 1980 he was a member of its board of directors. Since 2013, the Institute of Communication Science, University of Bamberg, has awarded the Manfred-Rühl-Preis (Prize) for outstanding Master's theses.

Manfred Rühl's research focuses were:

- Formation of communication theory
- Reflexive theories and application theories
- Organizational communication
- Journalistics, public relations, public communication
- Historical theories of communication science and communication policies

Based on system-theoretical ideas, Rühl worked on problems of human communication systems, aiming at a general theory of communication science. In contrast to behavioral and action theorizing, communication theories enable the analysis and synthesizing of sensemaking information, thematically delimiting messages and their understanding in societal contexts. Basic assumptions of general theory of communication science can already be observed in the late 17th century. Christian Thomasius preferred self-thinking in science and everyday life when, in his 1692 "Einleitung zur Sittenlehre" (Introduction to Morality), he formulated a theory of mutual dependence of man, communication and society. In "Zeitungs Lust und Nutz" (Newspaper's pleasure and use) of 1695, Kaspar Stieler distinguishes between communicating and publishing, and he propagates newspaper reading as a necessity for the "Politicus" in a (future) bourgeois society. The Young Hegelian Robert Eduard Prutz describes in 1845 journalism and democracy as two sides of a social developmental product. Economists and social scientists Karl Knies, Albert Schäffle, Karl Bücher and Max Weber on the one hand, Charles Horton Cooley, Robert Ezra Park, Harold Dwight Lasswell and further social scientists of the Chicago School on the other hand, observe connections between communication, the public, public opinion, railways and telegraphs, urban and organizational cultures, money, credit, time and society, on the "discovery of communication as a field of research, teaching, and professional employment" (Lasswell 1958).

== Death ==
Rühl died on 5 August 2026, at the age of 92.

== Selected works ==
- Die Zeitungsredaktion als organisiertes soziales System. Bertelsmann Universitätsverlag Bielefeld (1969); 2nd edition, Universitätsverlag Fribourg, Switzerland (1979), ISBN 3-7278-0202-2.
- Journalismus und Gesellschaft. Bestandsaufnahme und Theorieentwurf, von Hase & Koehler Verlag Mainz (1980), ISBN 3-7758-0975-9.
- Theorie der Public Relations. Ein Entwurf (Franz Ronneberger, coauthor), Westdeutscher Verlag Opladen (1992), ISBN 3-531-12118-9.
- Kommunikation und Erfahrung. Wege anwendungsbezogener Kommunikationsforschung. Verlag der Kommunikationswissenschaftlichen Forschungsvereinigung, Nürnberg (1987), ISBN 3-921453-26-7.
- Theorien der öffentlichen Kommunikation - Problemfelder, Positionen, Perspektiven (Günter Bentele, coeditor). Ölschläger Verlag München (1993), ISBN 3-88295-183-4.
- A market concept for media problems. A few theses. The Journal of Media Economics 6:1, 1993, 13–24.
- Publizistik im vernetzten Zeitalter. Berufe - Formen – Strukturen (with Beatrice Dernbach and Anna Maria Theis-Berglmair). Westdeutscher Verlag Opladen (1998), ISBN 3-531-13106-0.
- Publizieren. Eine Sinngeschichte der öffentlichen Kommunikation. Westdeutscher Verlag Opladen, Wiesbaden (1999), ISBN 3-531-13370-5.
- Organisatorischer Journalismus. Tendenzen der Redaktionsforschung. In: Neverla, Irene/Elke Grittmann/Monika Pater (Hrsg.): Grundlagentexte zur Journalistik. Konstanz: UVK Verlagsgesellschaft (2002), 303–320.
- Kommunikationskulturen der Weltgesellschaft. Theorie der Kommunikationswissenschaft. Verlag für Sozialwissenschaften Wiesbaden (2008), ISBN 978-3-531-14063-6.
- Journalism in a globalizing world society: A societal approach to journalism research. In: Martin Löffelholz & David Weaver, eds.: Global journalism research. Theories, methods, findings, future. Malden: Blackwell (2008), 28–38, ISBN 978-1-4051-5332-4.
- Public relations methodology: Should we bother (if it exists)? In: Betteke van Ruler, Ana Tkalac Verčič & Dejan Verčič (Hrsg.): Public relations metrics: Research and evaluation. New York, London: Routledge (2008), 21–35, ISBN 978-0-8058-6273-7.
- Journalistik und Journalismen im Wandel. Eine kommunikationswissenschaftliche Perspektive. Wiesbaden: Verlag für Sozialwissenschaften (2011), ISBN 978-3-531-17867-7.
- Journalismus und Public Relations. Theoriegeschichte zweier weltgesellschaftlicher Errungenschaften. Springer VS Wiesbaden (2015), ISBN 978-3-658-06533-1.
- Organisationskommunikation von Max Weber zu Niklas Luhmann. Wie interdisziplinäre Theoriebildung gelingen kann. Springer VS Wiesbaden (2015), ISBN 978-3-658-08923-8.
- Publizistikwissenschaft erneuern. Was wir über öffentliche Kommunikation wissen und was wir wissen können. Springer VS Wiesbaden (2016), ISBN 978-3-658-12839-5.
- Kommunikationswissenschaft. Selbstbeschreibung einer Sozialwissenschaft. Springer VS Wiesbaden (2018), ISBN 978-3-658-22481-3.
- A full list of Manfred Rühl's publications can be found on the University of Bamberg's website

== Publications ==
- Bentele, Günter und Kurt R. Hesse Hrsg.: Publizistik in der Gesellschaft. Festschrift für Manfred Rühl. Universitätsverlag Konstanz, Konstanz 1994, ISBN 3-87940-521-2
- Saxer, Ulrich: Begriffe als Denkzeug. Festrede bei der „Kommunikativen Hommage“ anlässlich des 60. Geburtstages von Manfred Rühl, gehalten am 11. Februar 1994, Otto-Friedrich-Universität Bamberg. In: Publizistik, Jg. 39, 1994, S. 205–209.
- Hömberg, Walter: Vielseitiger Komplexitätsartist. Manfred Rühl 65 Jahre. In: Publizistik, Jg. 44, 1999, S. 97–99.
- Scheu, Andreas: Manfred Rühl. Ein Pionier der deutschen Kommunikationswissenschaft. Magisterarbeit. Institut für Kommunikationswissenschaft und Medienforschung, Ludwig-Maximilians-Universität München 2005
- Ermunterung zum Theoretisieren, Hrsg. Michael Meyen und Maria Löblich: „Ich habe dieses Fach erfunden.“ Wie die Kommunikationswissenschaft an die deutschsprachigen Universitäten kam. 19 biografische Interviews. (= Theorie und Geschichte der Kommunikationswissenschaft; Bd. 4). Von Halem, Köln 2007, ISBN 978-3-938258-67-5, 76–100.
- Dialog Publizistik Bamberg-Wien. Kommunikationswissenschaft audiovisuell. Univ.-Prof. Dr. Manfred Rühl (Bamberg) im Gespräch mit Univ.-Prof. DDr. Roland Burkart und Univ.-Prof. Dr. Walter Hömberg (Wien). DVD, 69 Min., Wien 28. Juni 2013, Videoarchiv.

== Intermizations ==
- Lasswell, Harold D. 1958. Communications as an emerging discipline. AV Communication Review, 6: 245–254.
- Luhmann, Niklas. 1981. Kommunikation mit Zettelkästen. Ein Erfahrungsbericht. Hrsg. Horst Baier, Hans Mathias Kepplinger, Kurt Reumann. Öffentliche Meinung und sozialer Wandel. Public Opinion and Social Change. Festschrift für Elisabeth Noelle-Neumann. 222–228. Opladen: Westdeutscher Verlag.
- Prutz, Robert E. 1971. Geschichte des deutschen Journalismus. Erster Teil. Faksimiledruck nach der 1. Auflage von 1845. Mit einem Nachwort von Hans Joachim Kreutzer. Göttingen: Vandenhoeck & Ruprecht.
- Stieler, Kaspar. 1969. Zeitungs Lust und Nutz. Vollständiger Neudruck der Originalausgabe von 1695, Hrsg. Gert Hagelweide. 2. Aufl. Bremen: Schünemann.
- Thomasius, Christian. 1995. Einleitung zur Sittenlehre [Von der Kunst Vernünfftig und Tugenhafft zu lieben. Als dem eintzigen Mittel zu einem glückseligen / galanten und vergnügten Leben zu gelangen]. Nachdruck: Hildesheim u. a. Olms (zuerst 1692)
