= David Beringer =

German scientific instrument maker (1758–1821)

- Born: January 12, 1756
- Died: October 28, 1821 (aged 65)
- Occupation(s): Scientific instrument maker and craftsman
- Spouse: Anna Ottilia Hofmann (married 1777)

David Beringer (1756 – 1821) was a German scientific instrument maker and craftsman. Different sources report his place of birth as either Dieppe or Nuremberg. In either case, he was recorded as living in the Lorenzseite neighborhood of Nuremberg in 1798, and in Augsburg around 1776.

Admitted as a master craftsman in 1777, the same year as his marriage to Anna Ottillia Hofmann, Beringer is known for building cubic wooden sundials, most of which bore two signatures: his own and that of G.P. Seyfried, an associate presumably affiliated with one of the local guilds, which Beringer does not appear to have joined.

Beringer died as the result of an accident in 1821.

Examples of Beringer's work

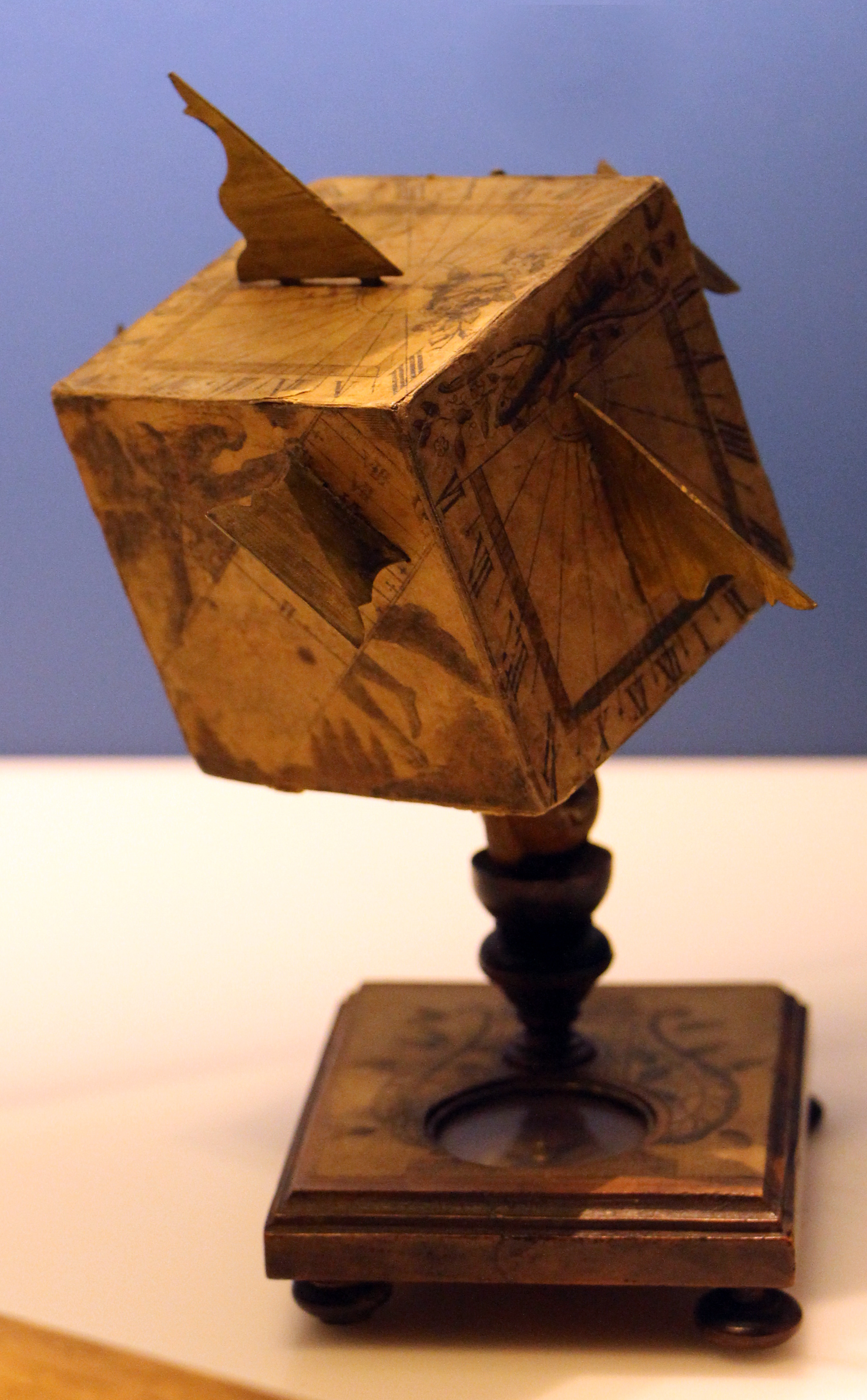
Orologio solare, xvi-xvii sec. 01

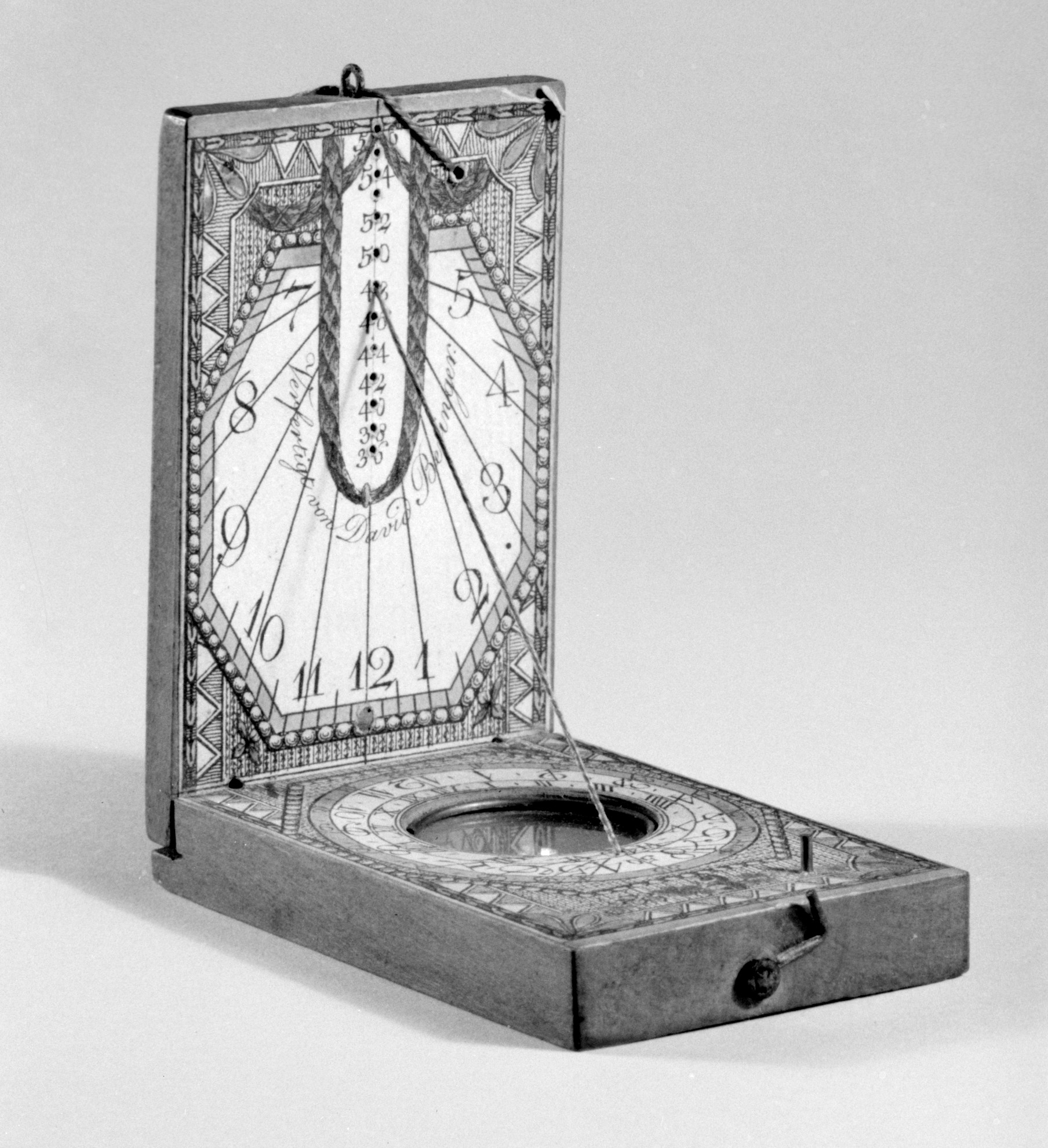
Portable diptych sundial MET 188801

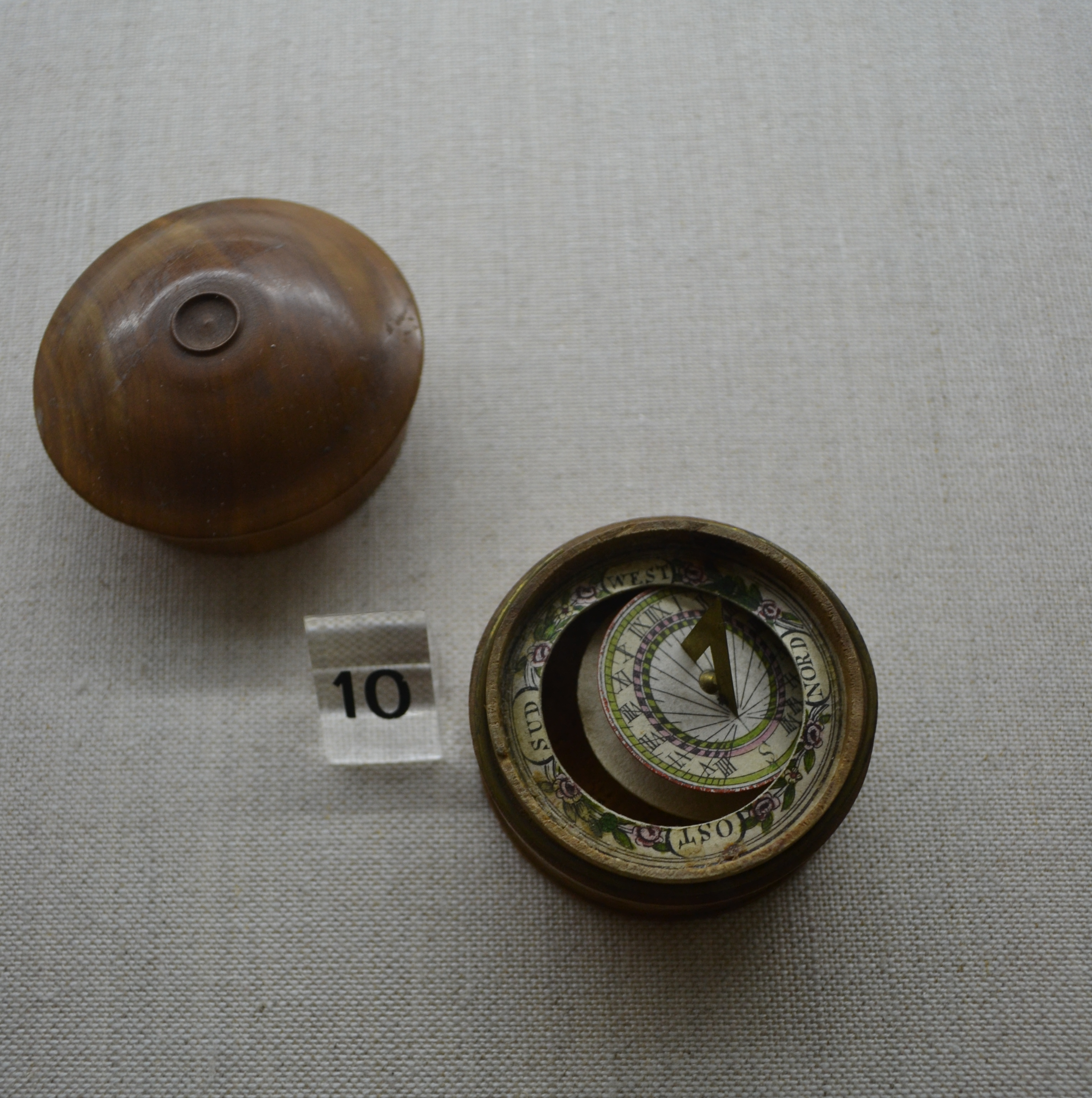
Cuadrante solar (Siglo XVIII). Museo Naval de Madrid.
