= Michael Bümel =

German scientific instrument maker

Michael Bümel (17th century) was a German scientific instrument maker. He was a maker of surveying instruments, active in Nuremberg between 1613 and 1633.
