= Ulrich Rück =

German collector of musical instruments, chemist and dealer in pianos

Ulrich Rück (October 18, 1882 in Nuremberg – November 6, 1962 in Nuremberg) was a German collector of musical instruments, chemist and dealer in pianos.

== Biography ==
Ulrich Rück, together with his brother Hans, continued the work of his father Wilhelm Rück, who had founded a collection of historical musical instruments in Nuremberg around 1880. Particularly in the 1930s Ulrich Rück succeeded in expanding the collection considerably. Shortly before his death he bequeathed the collection containing approximately 1500 items to the Germanisches Nationalmuseum in Nuremberg.

After World War II this was undoubtedly the largest and most important private collection of historical musical instruments in Europe and Rück saw himself as patron of a new area of performance using examples of such historical instruments. He cooperated with music scholars from all corners of Europe and maintained contacts with restorers, most notably Otto Marx of the Heyer collection in Cologne and Leipzig.

Amongst Rück's most important projects was the work to restore to playability Wolfgang Amadeus Mozart's fortepiano in the possession of the Internationale Stiftung Mozarteum in Salzburg in 1937. Extensive notes, photographs and a wealth of correspondence belonging to Rück's estate, currently being added to the archives department of the Germanisches Nationalmuseum, provide detailed information about the collection history and the work involved in it.

== Works ==
• Mozarts Hammerflügel erbaute Anton Walter, Wien. Technische Studien, Vergleiche und Beweise. In: Mozart-Jahrbuch 1955 (1956), p. 246–286

== Literature ==
• John Henry van der Meer: In memoriam Dr. Dr. h.c. Ulrich Rück, in: Monatsanzeiger des Germanischen Nationalmuseums, No. 80, 1987, p. 638ff
