= Carl van der Hoeven =

German composer and organist (1580–1661)

Carl van der Hoeven (also Hoffen, Houen, Houven, Hoven, Howen, Carolus von der Hauf) (1580 – May 5, 1661) was a German composer and organist born in Nuremberg. Hoeven studied under a composer named Hassler, either Hans Leo Hassler or Kaspar Hassler, and joined the court of Georg von Zollern in Hechingen as a composer in 1606. He appears to have been associated with this court until 1611, though in 1609 he took a position as organist at the court in Salzburg, where he remained for more than fifty years.

Hoeven's work includes keyboard pieces and sacred vocal music, which shows the influence of the Venetian school of the early baroque. Some of his choral works make use of antiphonal settings.
