= Moritz Rosenhaupt =

German ḥazzan and composer (1841–1900)

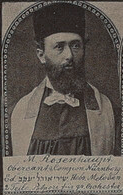
- Moritz Rosenhaupt in 1891
- Born: March 14, 1841; Jesberg or Offenbach am Glan, Prussia
- Died: November 16, 1900 (aged 59); Nuremberg, Germany
- Occupations: Ḥazzan, composer
- Spouse: Johanna Fränkel (m. 1869)

Moritz (Moses) Rosenhaupt (March 14, 1841 – November 16, 1900) was a German ḥazzan and composer.

== Biography ==
Moritz Rosenhaupt was born in 1841 in Jesberg or Offenbach am Glan, Prussia, where his father Jacob served as a rabbi and teacher. He began his musical education under the guidance of Cantor Maurice Löwe in Strasbourg and furthered his studies with his distant relative Salomon Sulzer in Vienna.

Rosenhaupt afterwards assumed the roles of cantor and teacher in Cochem am Mosel. In 1864, he was appointed to a similar position in Speyer, where he received instruction in music theory and counterpoint from prominent Catholic musicians Heinrich Benedikt Wiss and Johann Baptist Benz. In 1881, Rosenhaupt succeeded Josef Singer as chief cantor of the Grand Synagogue of Nuremberg, following Singer's relocation to Vienna.

Rosenhaupt played a pivotal role in codifying the South German synagogue liturgy in musical notation. During his career, Rosenhaupt authored Schire Ohel Yaakov, a collection of synagogal songs, published in three parts. Noteworthy among his compositions is a musical rendition of Psalm 42 as a concerto. He also composed several Hebrew songs and various secular pieces, including overtures, serenades for orchestra, and similar works.

He died in Nuremberg on November 16, 1900. His music collection, held in the Speyer Synagogue, were destroyed when the synagogue was burned in November pogroms of 1938.

== Selected publications ==
- Freitag Abend Gottesdienst. Schire Ohel Yaakov, Gottesdienstliche Gesänge für Israeliten. Vol. 1. Speyer: C. Rucker. 1879.
- Sabbath-Morgen-Gottesdienst. Schire Ohel Yaakov, Gottesdienstliche Gesänge für Israeliten. Vol. 2. Frankfurt: J. Kauffmann. 1887.
- Werktags-Gottesdienst, Traditionelle Melodien u. Casualien. Vol. 3. Frankfurt: J. Kauffmann. 1895.
- Schluss-Kadish le-yamim noraʼim für Cantor, Unisono-Chor und Gemeinde, op. 45, No. 2. Speyer: Selbstverl. 1879.
- ʿAlenu ve-Adon ʿolam: gottesdienstliche Schlussgesänge für die Synagoge. Frankfurt: J. Kauffmann. 1880.
