= Georg Leykauf =

German steel metalware producer

Georg Leykauf (born February 24, 1847) was a steel metalware producer and trader in Nuremberg, Bavaria.

He started working in his stepfather's cutlery grinding and polishing company. After his stepfather's death in 1864, he took over the family business. His son Hans Leykauf (b. May 22, 1870) became an employee and later co-owner. Georg Leykauf was rewarded the title of Councillor of Commerce to the Royal Bavarian Court in 1906. He received the royal warrant title from various courts for the high quality of products and services, including Purveyor to the Imperial and Royal Court of Austria-Hungary, royal warrant holder of Romania, Bavaria, Hesse, Baden, Anhalt and Saxony.

The shop was located at Karolinenstraße 1 opposite the St Lawrence Church. The shop was destroyed during World War II in the aerial bombings of the city.
