= Wilfried Happel =

German writer and theatre director (born 1965)

Wilfried Happel (born 2 July 1965) is a German writer and theatre director.

== Life ==
Born in Nuremberg, Happel studied German studies and philosophy in Cologne and Frankfurt am Main. He writes plays, stories, radio plays and film scripts. His theatre text Stück mit zehn Titeln was published by Verlag der Autoren in 2006. He staged Artheater in Cologne as a guest performance in the Theatre Der Keller Schluss mit Schubert! in Berlin, Der Spaziergänger after Robert Walser at the Hebbel am Ufer in 2000. Happel regularly works on the Würzburg off-theatre stage "Theater Ensemble".

== Theater plays (selection) ==
- Das Schamhaar (UA Bühnen der Stadt Köln 1994)
- Mordslust (UA Bühnen der Stadt Köln 1995)
- Fressorgie oder Der Gott als Suppenfleisch (UA Autorenspektakel Hannover 2000)
- Der Nudelfresser (UA Deutsches Theater, Berlin 2000)
- In-Contenance (Off-UA Berlin 2001)
- Geliebter Mars (Off-UA Potsdam 2002)
- Die Wortlose (UA Gostner Hoftheater, Nürnberg 2002)
- Mein Onkel Bob (UA Staatstheater Nürnberg 2003)
- Die Nebelmaschine (Theater Ensemble)
- Fischfutter (UA Stadttheater Bremerhaven 2005)
- Stück mit zehn Titeln (UA Theaterwerkstatt Würzburg 2017)
- Neukölln-Teheran
- Der Liebesakt

== Bibliography ==
- Franziska Schößler: Augen-Blicke: Erinnerung, Zeit und Geschichte in Dramen der neunziger Jahre. Narr, Tübingen 2004 (Forum modernes Theater, 33), chapter 3.1.3, p. 271, ("Wilfried Happel, John von Düffel - Autistische Familienspiele")
