= Paul Schad-Rossa =

German painter (1862 –1916)

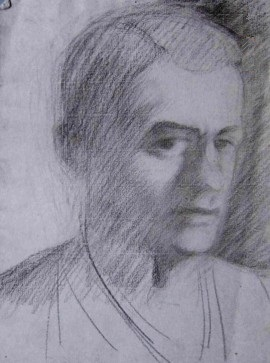
Self-portrait (c.1907)

Georg Paul Schad, known as Paul Schad-Rossa (1 January 1862 – 1 November 1916) was a German painter and sculptor, in the Symbolist style.

== Life and work ==
He was born in Nuremberg. His father was a railway conductor. He began his artistic education at the Academy of Fine Arts, Nuremberg, where he studied sculpture. In 1882, he passed the entrance exam at the Academy of Fine Arts, Munich. There, he studied painting from nature with Ludwig von Löfftz and Franz Defregger, and covered his living expenses by copying the Old Masters. One of his clients was King Carol I of Romania.

In 1888, he left the academy and opened his own art school; becoming part of a circle of creative artists associated with the writer, Hermann Löns, who wrote a poem about him. After 1892, he came under the influence of the Munich Secession. Although he would continue to paint en plein aire for the rest of his life, he would later say that "art is the opposite of nature".

Around 1900, Wilhelm Gurlitt, President of the Steiermärkische Kunstverein (artists' association), began promoting modernism in Graz, a very traditional city. This gained Schad-Rossa's support, and he moved to Graz to help in his efforts by opening a new art school. Within a year, he held the first exhibition of his student's works, as well as his own. In 1901, he wrote the statutes for a proposed "Grazer Künstlerbund". These were accepted, and he was elected chairman of the new association. Shortly after, he organized an exhibition featuring eight local artists. The association was dissolved in 1903, for lack of public support. He continued to teach for a brief time, but left Graz in 1904. The Steiermärkische Kunstverein was also dissolved, in 1906.

He chose to settle in Berlin, where he would live the rest of his life. From there, he made trips to Italy, Spain, and Portugal, as well as throughout the Bavarian Alps. At the Große Berliner Kunstausstellung of 1914, he was given his own room, where he displayed twenty-three works. Two years later he died, at the age of fifty-four. His works may be seen at the Städtische Museum in Halle and the Landesmuseum Kärnten in Klagenfurt.

== Selected paintings ==
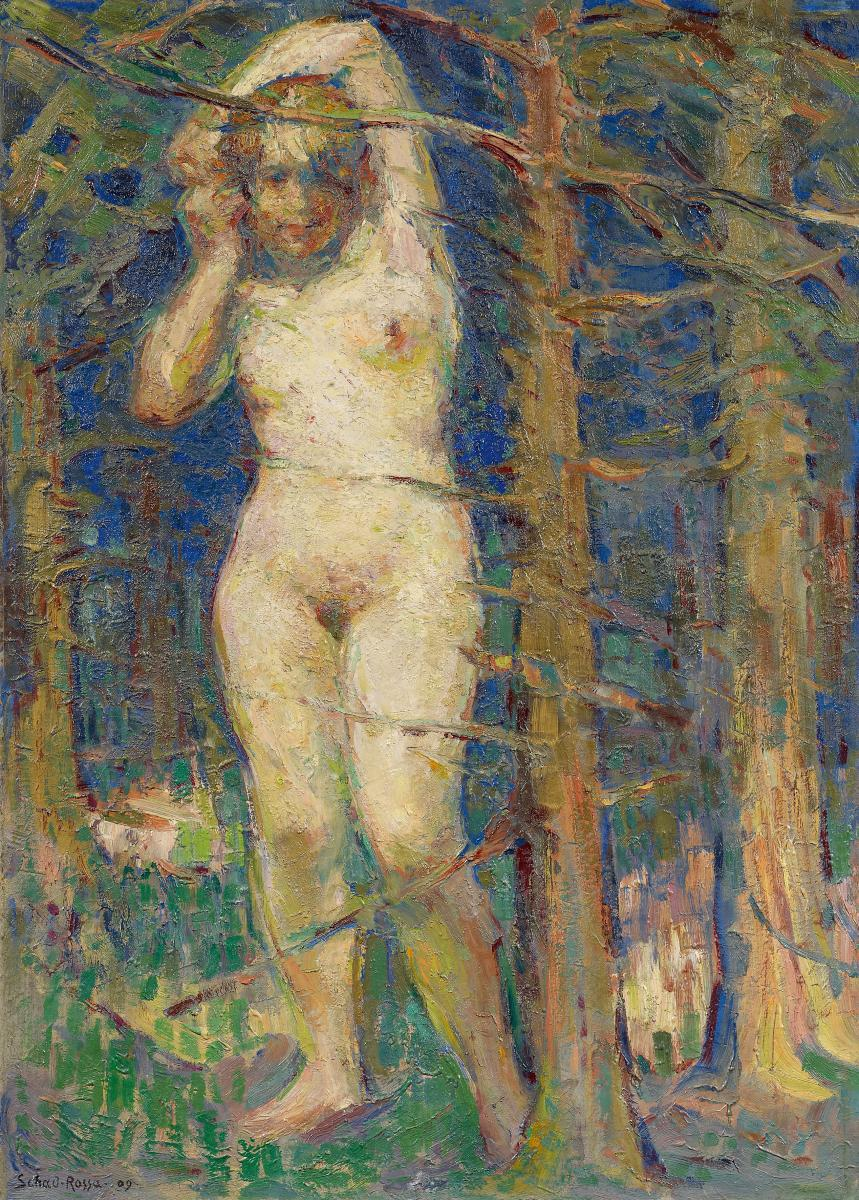
In the Sunny Woods

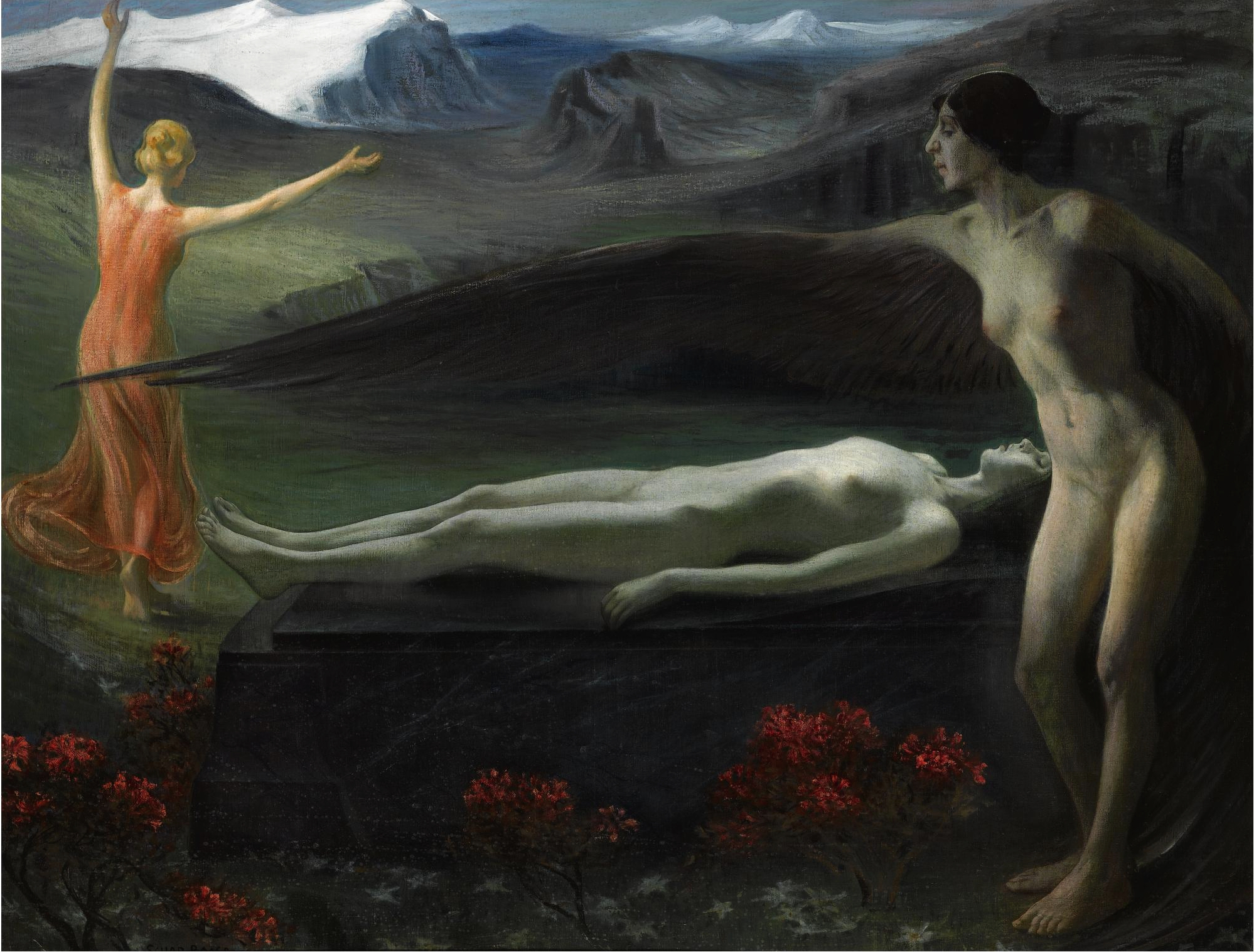
Into Eternity

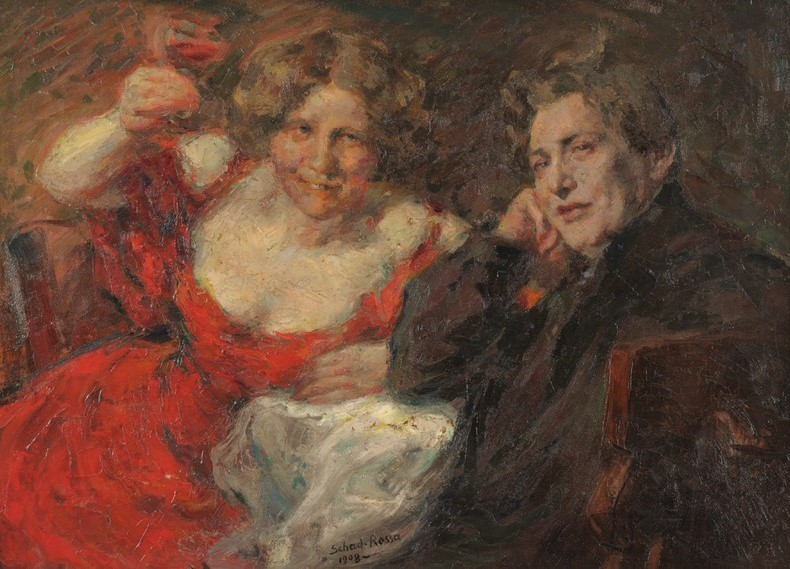
Ferruccio Busoni and His Wife

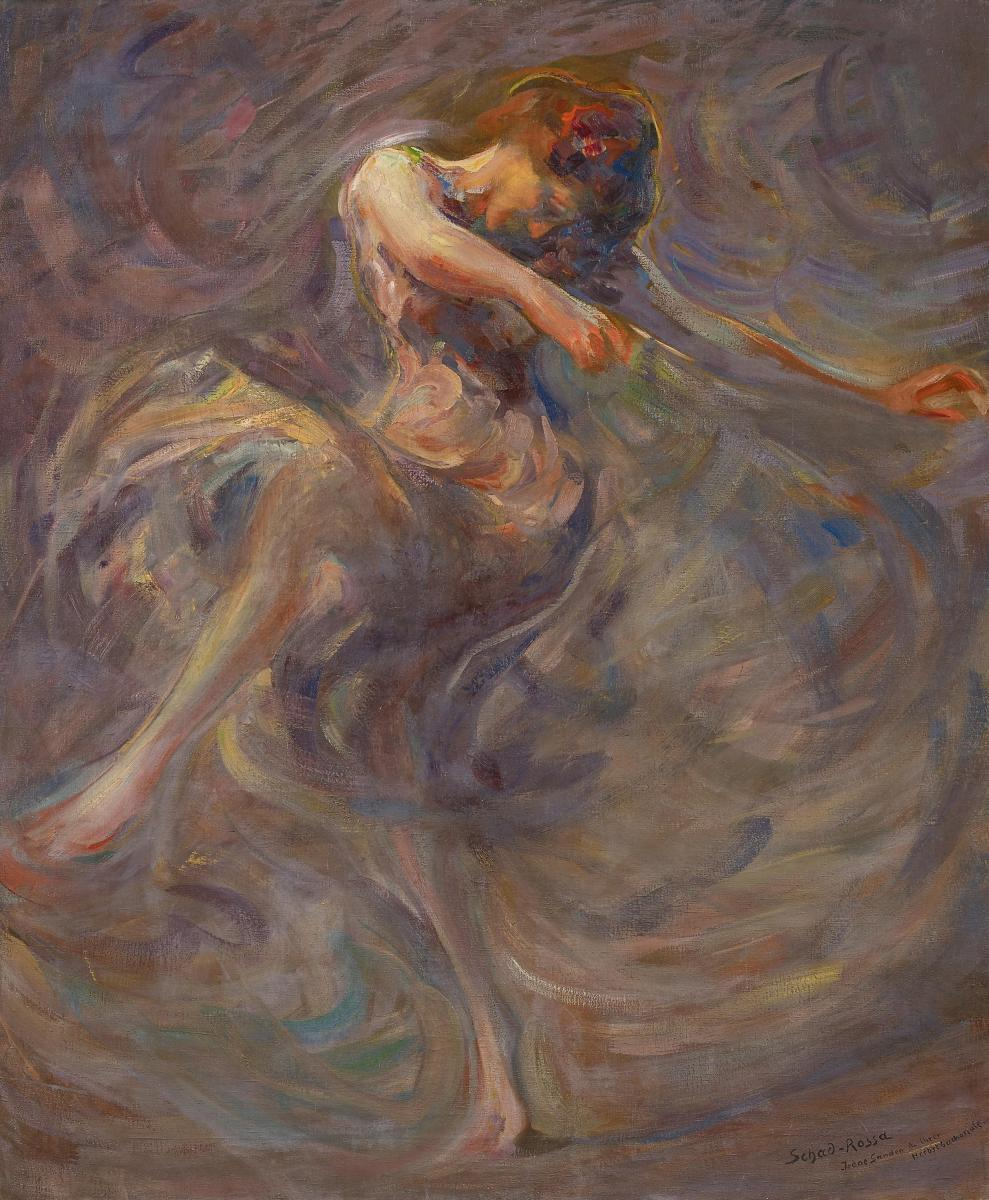
Dancer

== Sources ==
- Eva Klein: "Vergessene Steirische Moderne. Paul Schad-Rossa und das kreative Milieu um 1900". In: Historisches Jahrbuch der Stadt Graz. Vol. 41, pp. 593–616, Graz 2012, ISSN 0440-9728
- Hermann Löns: "Bei Paul Schad". In: Gedanken und Gestalten, Wilhelm Deimann (Ed.), Sponholtz, Hannover 1924
- Hans Riehl: "Die steiermärkische Malerei 1850–1950". In: Oberösterreichische Heimatblätter, Institut für Landeskunde, Landesmuseum Linz, #3/4, 1951 pp. 318–326, (Online)
- Gudrun Danzer, Peter Pakesch (Eds.), Aufbruch in die Moderne? Paul Schad-Rossa und die Kunst in Graz, exhibition catalog, Universalmuseum Joanneum, Graz 2014 (Online)
- Paul Schad-Rossa (1862-1916): Die Wiederentdeckung eines Symbolisten, catalog of the special exhibition in Engen, Velten Wagner (Ed.), Stadt Engen 2014. ISBN 978-3-938816-14-1
