= Hermann Bek-Gran =

German art professor

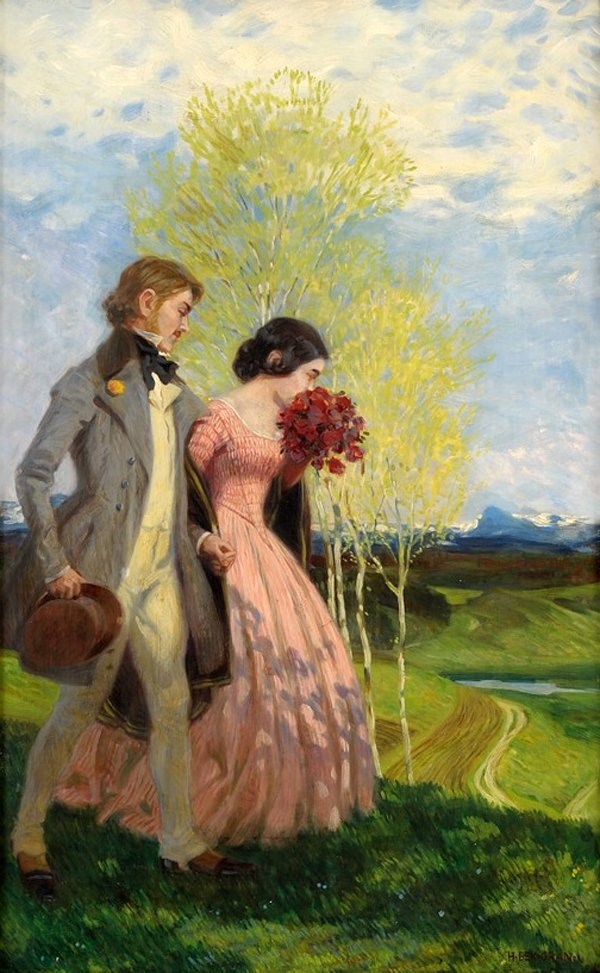
- 1909 painting by Bek
- Born: Hermann Bek; September 20, 1869; Mainz, Grand Duchy of Hesse
- Died: July 9, 1909 (aged 39); Nürnberg, Kingdom of Bavaria, German Empire
- Known for: Painting

Hermann Bek-Gran (né Bek; September 20, 1869 – July 9, 1909) was a German painter, graphic artist, typographer, and university professor.

Bek-Gran was born in Mainz, Germany, to Karl von Beck and Marie Magdalene Auguste Beck (née Grann). He was educated at the Kunstgewerbeschule Nürnberg (School of Applied Arts, Nuremberg), and later enrolled at the Königlichen Kunstakademie in München (Royal Arts Academy, Munich) in nature classes on October 21, 1889.

After university, Bek-Gran worked as a freelance artist in Munich painting nature, portrait, and slice of life scenes. He also painted commercial graphics, posters, and ex libris. In 1902 Bek-Gran was a founding member of Der Bund Zeichnender Künstler in München. Hermann maintained guest status with the Hagenbund. In 1905, Hermann was appointed professor of hand-drawing at the School of Applied Arts, Nuremberg. He created the Bek-Gran font for the D. Stempel Type Foundry in 1906.

In his personal life, Hermann married Marie Maison, and together they had three children. Early in his career Hermann changed his last name from Bek to Bek-Gran (sometimes stylized Bekgran), adding his mother's maiden name as a hyphenate. He died on July 9, 1909, in Nuremberg, Germany
