= Alexander Strehl =

German computer scientist

Alexander Strehl (born in Nuremberg) is a computer scientist, management consultant and business school professor. His areas of expertise are machine learning, consensus clustering, business intelligence, big data, artificial intelligence, cluster analysis, data mining, entrepreneurship and digital transformation. He received a Ph.D. in Computer Engineering from the University of Texas at Austin, was the creator of cluster ensembles, a director of flatfox AG, and a management consultant at McKinsey & Company. He is currently teaching at the University of Aalen and serves as an independent industry consultant.
