= Ernst Gröschel =

German pianist (1918–2000)

Ernst Gröschel (9 December 1918 in Nuremberg – 5 May 2000 in Zams, Tirol) was a German pianist. Gröschel studied with Emil von Sauer and others in Vienna. He is regarded as the first pianist who played Mozart and Beethoven completely on historical keyboard instruments. He was a member of the Bamberg Piano Quartet. He left behind a large number of recordings both on vinyl and in the archives of the Bayerischer Rundfunk.

== Publications ==
- Ernst Gröschel auf einem historischen Hammerflügel - Bach, Johann Sebastian. - S.l.: Colosseum-Schallplatten, 1973
- Mozart auf dem Hammerklavier. Menuett und Trio G-Dur KV1 - Mozart, Wolfgang Amadeus. - S.l.: Colosseum-Schallplatten, 1973
- Konzerte, Kl Orch Klavierkonzerte Tonträger - Beethoven, Ludwig van. - Merenberg: Zyx Music, P 2008
- Trios, Vl Vc Kl (1997) Trio für Klavier, Violine und Violoncello - Klepper, Wilhelm. - Bamberg: Egino Klepper, 2000
- Oktette, MWV R 20 Streichoktett E-Dur op. 20 - Mendelssohn Bartholdy, Felix. - Hamburg: Line Music, 2000
