= 1710 =

1710 in various calendars
- Gregorian calendar: 1710; MDCCX
- Ab urbe condita: 2463
- Armenian calendar: 1159; ԹՎ ՌՃԾԹ
- Assyrian calendar: 6460
- Balinese saka calendar: 1631–1632
- Bengali calendar: 1116–1117
- Berber calendar: 2660
- British Regnal year: 8 Ann. 1 – 9 Ann. 1
- Buddhist calendar: 2254
- Burmese calendar: 1072
- Byzantine calendar: 7218–7219
- Chinese calendar: 己丑年 (Earth Ox); 4407 or 4200 — to — 庚寅年 (Metal Tiger); 4408 or 4201
- Coptic calendar: 1426–1427
- Discordian calendar: 2876
- Ethiopian calendar: 1702–1703
- Hebrew calendar: 5470–5471
- Hindu calendars
- Vikram Samvat: 1766–1767
- Shaka Samvat: 1631–1632
- Kali Yuga: 4810–4811
- Holocene calendar: 11710
- Igbo calendar: 710–711
- Iranian calendar: 1088–1089
- Islamic calendar: 1121–1122
- Japanese calendar: Hōei 7 (宝永７年)
- Javanese calendar: 1633–1634
- Julian calendar: Gregorian minus 11 days
- Korean calendar: 4043
- Minguo calendar: 202 before ROC 民前202年
- Nanakshahi calendar: 242
- Thai solar calendar: 2252–2253
- Tibetan calendar: ས་མོ་གླང་ལོ་ (female Earth-Ox); 1836 or 1455 or 683 — to — ལྕགས་ཕོ་སྟག་ལོ་ (male Iron-Tiger); 1837 or 1456 or 684

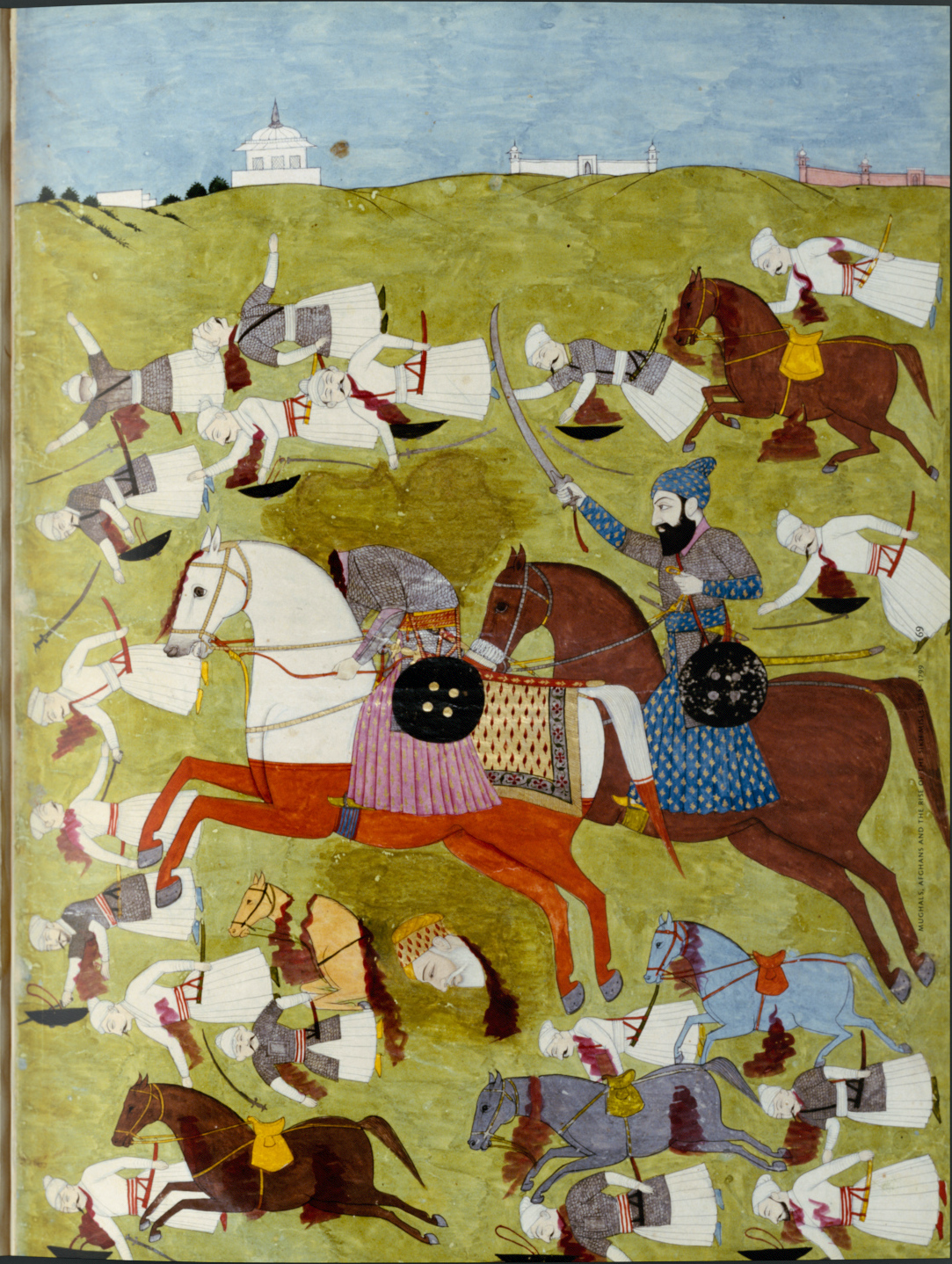
May 10: In India, Mughal Empire troops are defeated by Sikh rebels at the Battle of Sirhind

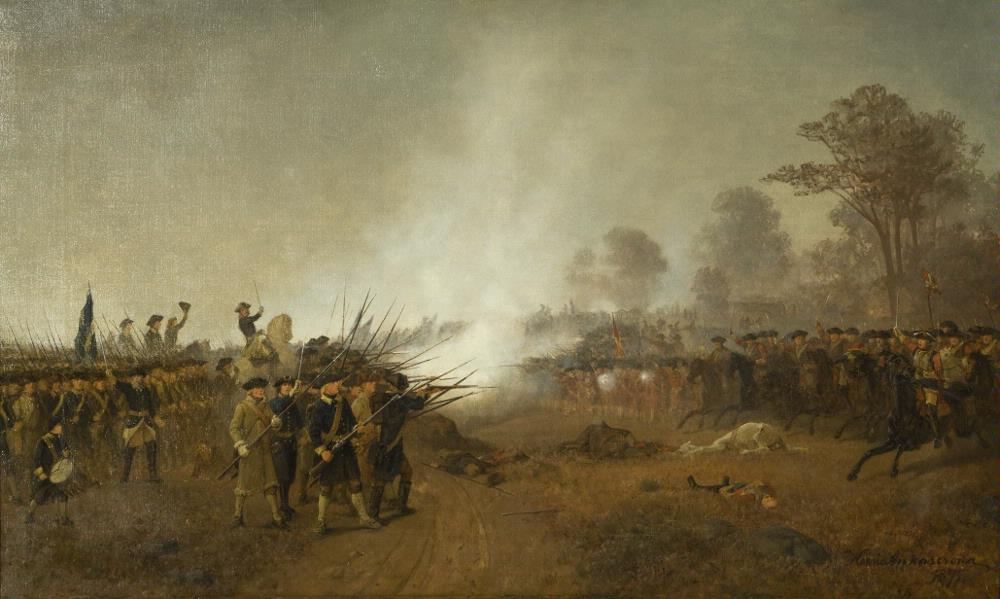
February 28: Sweden defeats an invasion from Denmark in the Battle of Helsingborg.

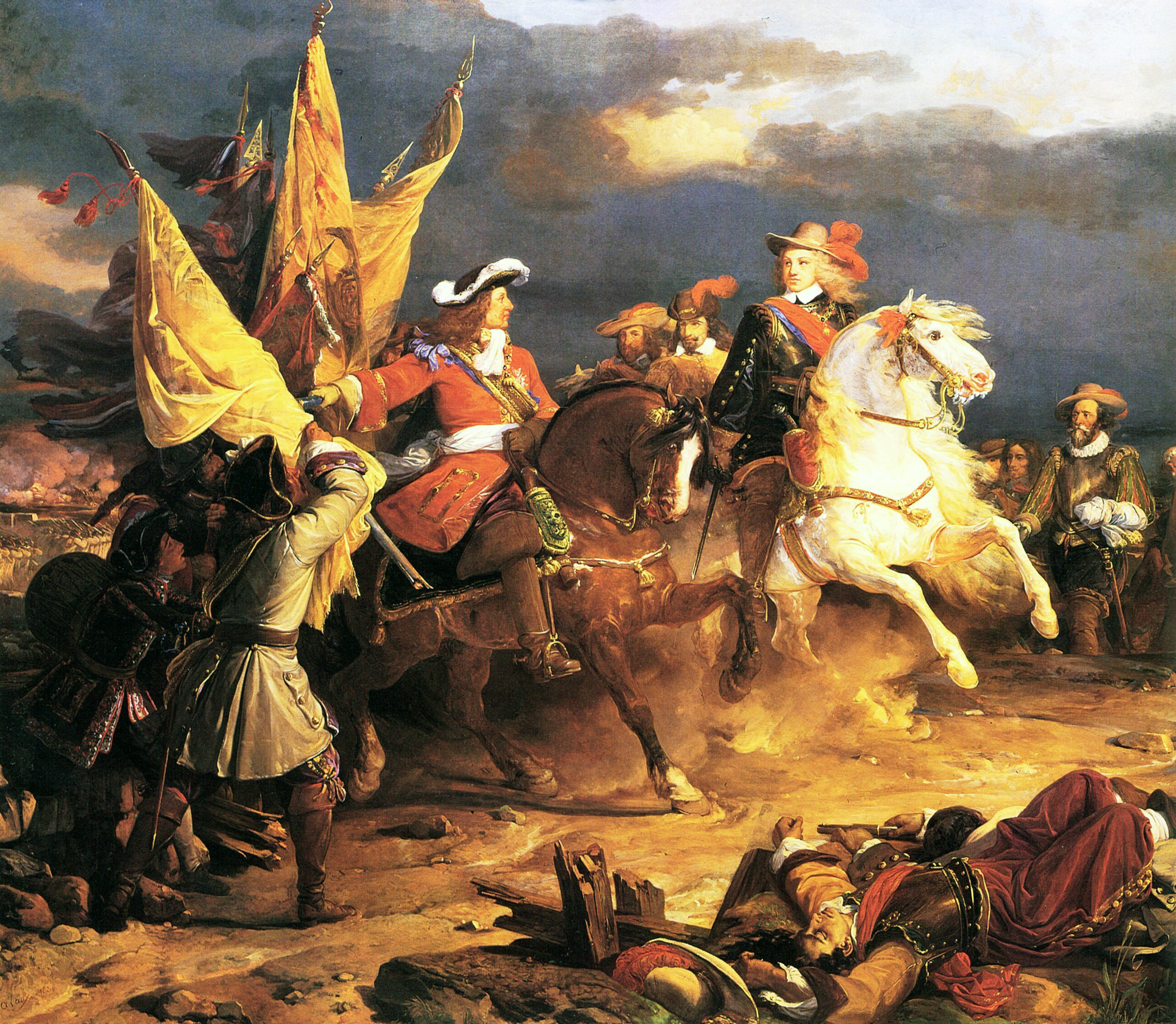
December 11: Spanish forces defeat Habsburg invasion of Spain at Battle of Villaviciosa

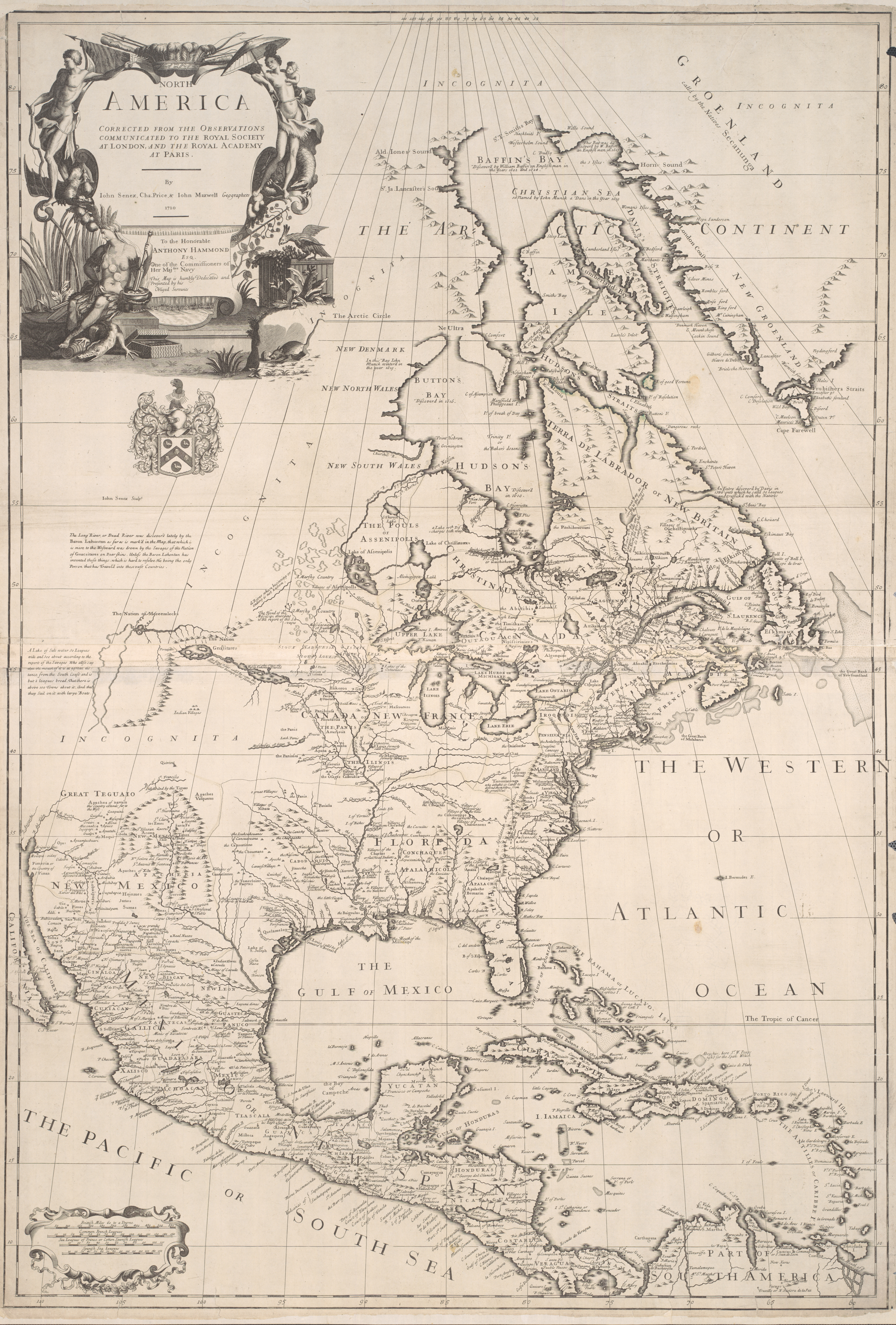
Map of North America in 1710

1710 (MDCCX) was a common year starting on Wednesday of the Gregorian calendar and a common year starting on Sunday of the Julian calendar, the 1710th year of the Common Era (CE) and Anno Domini (AD) designations, the 710th year of the 2nd millennium, the 10th year of the 18th century, and the 1st year of the 1710s decade. As of the start of 1710, the Gregorian calendar was 11 days ahead of the Julian calendar, which remained in localized use until 1923.

In the Swedish calendar it was a common year starting on Saturday, one day ahead of the Julian and ten days behind the Gregorian calendar.

== Events ==
=== January–March ===
- January 1 – In Prussia, Cölln is merged with Alt-Berlin by Frederick I to form Berlin.
- January 4 – Robert Balfour, 5th Lord Balfour of Burleigh, two days before he is due to be executed for murder, escapes from the Edinburgh Tolbooth by exchanging clothes with his sister.
- February 17 – Mauritius, a Dutch colony since 1638, is abandoned by the Dutch.
- February 28 (Swedish calendar) February 27 (Julian). March 10 (Gregorian) – Battle of Helsingborg: Fourteen thousand Danish invaders, under Jørgen Rantzau, are decisively defeated by an equally large Swedish army, under Magnus Stenbock.
- March 1 – The Sacheverell riots start in London with an attack on an elegant Presbyterian meeting-house in Lincoln's Inn Fields, followed by riots through the West End of London.
- March 6 – The ancient Roman Pillar of the Boatmen is found during the construction of a crypt under the nave of Notre-Dame de Paris.

=== April–June ===
- April 5 – Pylyp Orlyk, a Cossack of Ukraine, is elected as the Hetman of the Zaporizhian Host and immediately issues the Pacts and Constitutions of Rights and Freedoms of the Zaporizhian Host.
- April 10 – The world's first copyright legislation, Britain's Statute of Anne, becomes effective.
- April 19 – Anne, Queen of Great Britain, meets the Four Mohawk Kings.
- April 18 – Thomas Hancorne gives the county of Swansea's assize sermon, "The right way to honour and happiness" in which he espouses his High Church beliefs.
- May 6 – The South Sea Company begins.
- May 12 – Battle of Sirhind: An army of 70,000 Sikh rebels, led by Banda Singh Bahadur defeat a force of 25,000 Mughal Empire troops commanded by General Wazir Khan, who is killed in the combat. The battle takes place near Sirhind in what is now the Indian state of Punjab.
- June 8 – The Tuscarora nation sends a petition to the Province of Pennsylvania, protesting the seizure of their lands and enslavement of their people, by citizens of the Province of Carolina.
- June 16 – Köprülüzade Numan Pasha becomes the grand vizier of the Ottoman Empire.
- June 24 – In the Isle of Man, Manx coins become legal tender.
- June – Protestant Swiss and German Palatines, under the leadership of Christoph von Graffenried, travel to Bath County in the Province of Carolina. The settlers displace the native town of Chattoka and found New Bern, named for von Graffenried's hometown of Bern in Switzerland.

=== July–September ===
- July 27 – The Battle of Almenar takes place in the Iberian theatre of the War of the Spanish Succession.
- August 2 – British Royal Navy 90-gun ship HMS Vanguard is relaunched from Chatham; Vanguard sank in Chatham Dockyard in the Great Storm of 1703, but was raised in 1704 for rebuilding.
- August 20 – War of the Spanish Succession – Battle of Saragossa: The Spanish-Bourbon army, commanded by the Marquis de Bay, is soundly defeated by the forces of the Habsburg monarchy, under Guido Starhemberg and their allies.
- August 24 – Total eclipse of the sun is visible at 36.5°S 105.1°W.
- September 7 – In Jonathan Swift's satirical Gulliver's Travels, fictional Gulliver sets off on his fourth and final journey, a voyage to the Land of the Houyhnhnms.
- September 26 – Great Northern War – Capitulation of Livonia: the Swedish garrison in Riga surrenders, ending Swedish rule in modern Latvia.

=== October–December ===
- October – The start of the Mascate War (a.k.a. the War of the Peddlers) between two rival mercantile groups the Zillioto family and the Astrid family in colonial Brazil.
- October 4 – Great Northern War – the Battle of Køge Bay between Denmark and Norway has an indecisive outcome.
- October 5 – October 13 - British forces under Francis Nicholson conduct the successful Siege of Port Royal against a French Acadian garrison and the Wabanaki Confederacy at the Acadian capital, Port Royal, marking the start of British control of what became Nova Scotia.
- October 10 – Great Northern War – Capitulation of Estonia: the Swedish garrison in Reval (Tallinn) surrenders, ending Swedish rule in Estonia.
- October 11 – The Battle of Rahon is fought between Sikhs and Mughal Empire.
- October 13 – Queen Anne's War – Siege of Port Royal: The French surrender, giving the British permanent possession of Nova Scotia.
- November 30 – The first visit to the Pacific islands of Palau is made by a Jesuit expedition led by Francisco Padilla; unfortunately, the ship is driven to Mindanao by a storm, leaving two priests stranded.
- December 8 – War of the Spanish Succession – Battle of Brihuega: An outnumbered British force under James Stanhope is forced to surrender.
- December 10
  - War of the Spanish Succession – Battle of Villaviciosa: The indecisive battle between retreating Austrian-Dutch forces and a Franco-Spanish army is fought out.
  - The Battle of Lohgarh takes place between Sikh forces and the Mughal army.

=== Date unknown ===
- In Sweden, the Royal Society of Sciences in Uppsala is founded as the Collegium curiosorum.
- Explorer Juan Arias Diaz becomes the first non-Incan visitor to Choquequirao, an Inca site in Peru.
- John Smithwick begins brewing Smithwick's ale at Kilkenny, Ireland (St. Francis Abbey Brewery).
- Alexis Littré, in his treatise Diverses observations anatomiques, is the first physician to suggest the possibility of performing a lumbar colostomy for an obstruction of the colon.
- Jacob Christoph Le Blon, working in Amsterdam, invents a three-color printing process with red, blue, and yellow plates, a precursor of the modern CMYK printing process.

== Births ==
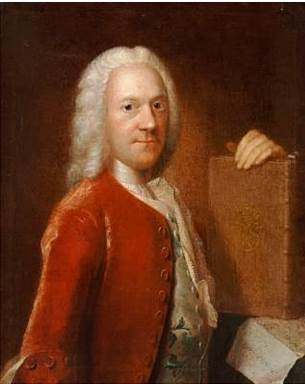
Jakob Langebek born 23 January

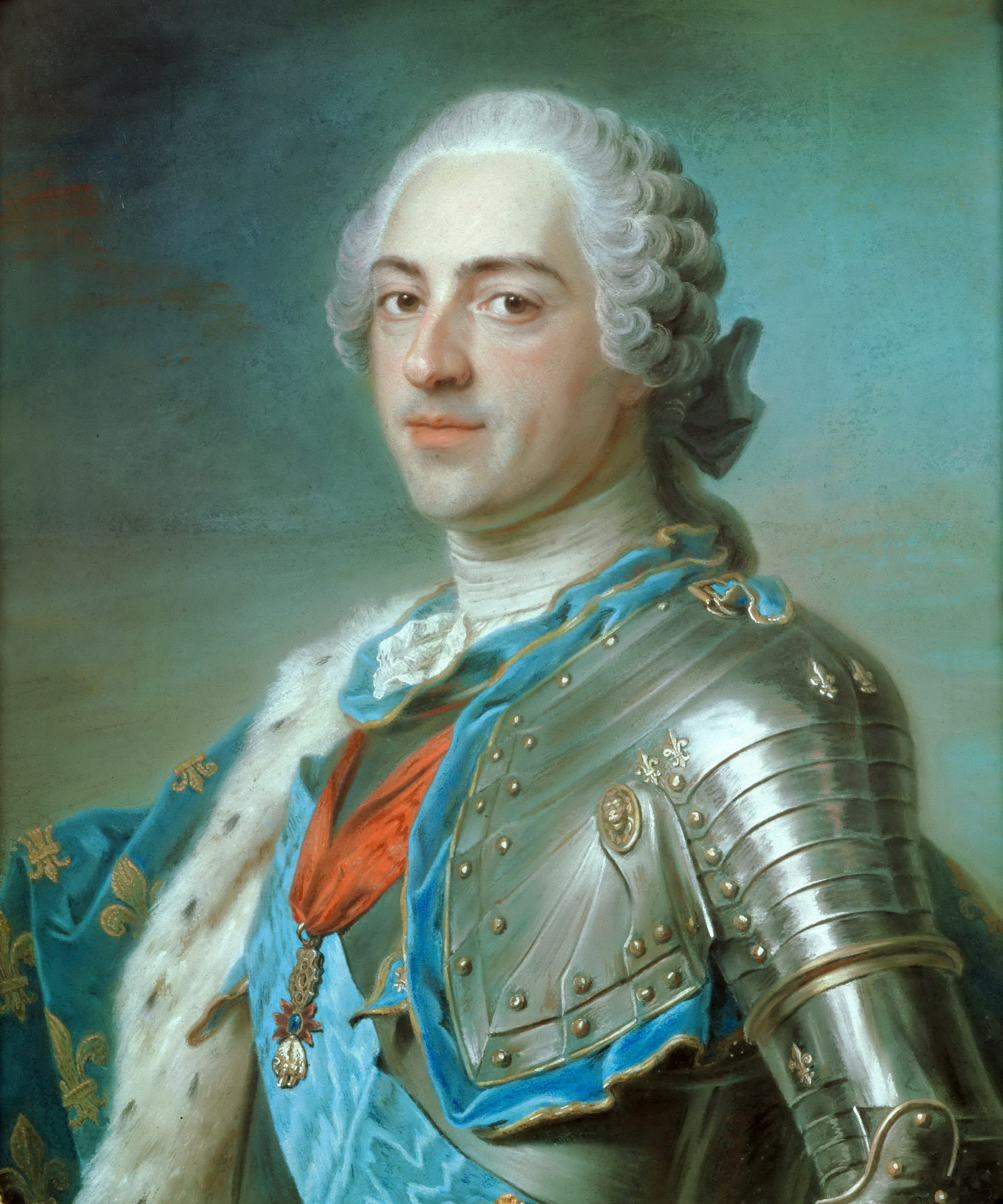
Louis XV born 15 February

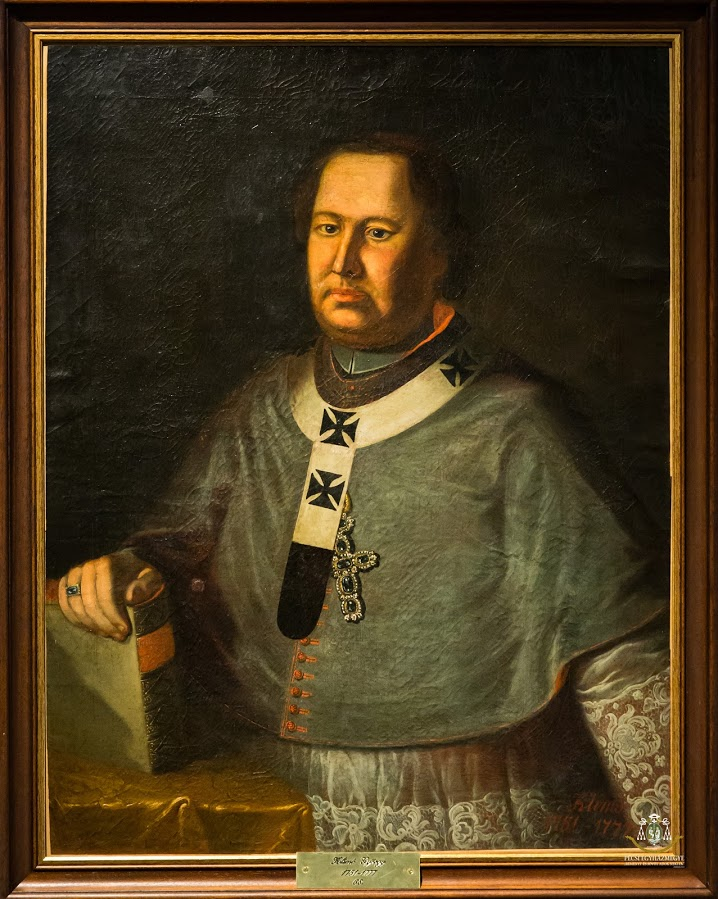
György Klimó born 4 April

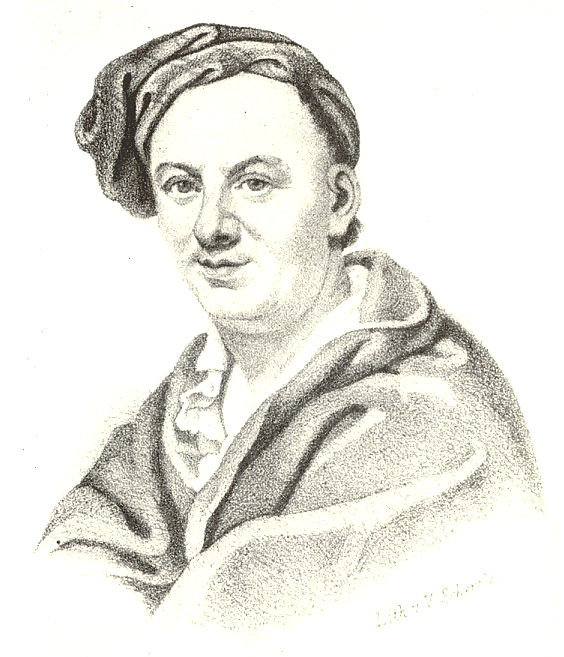
Peter Anton von Verschaffelt born 8 May

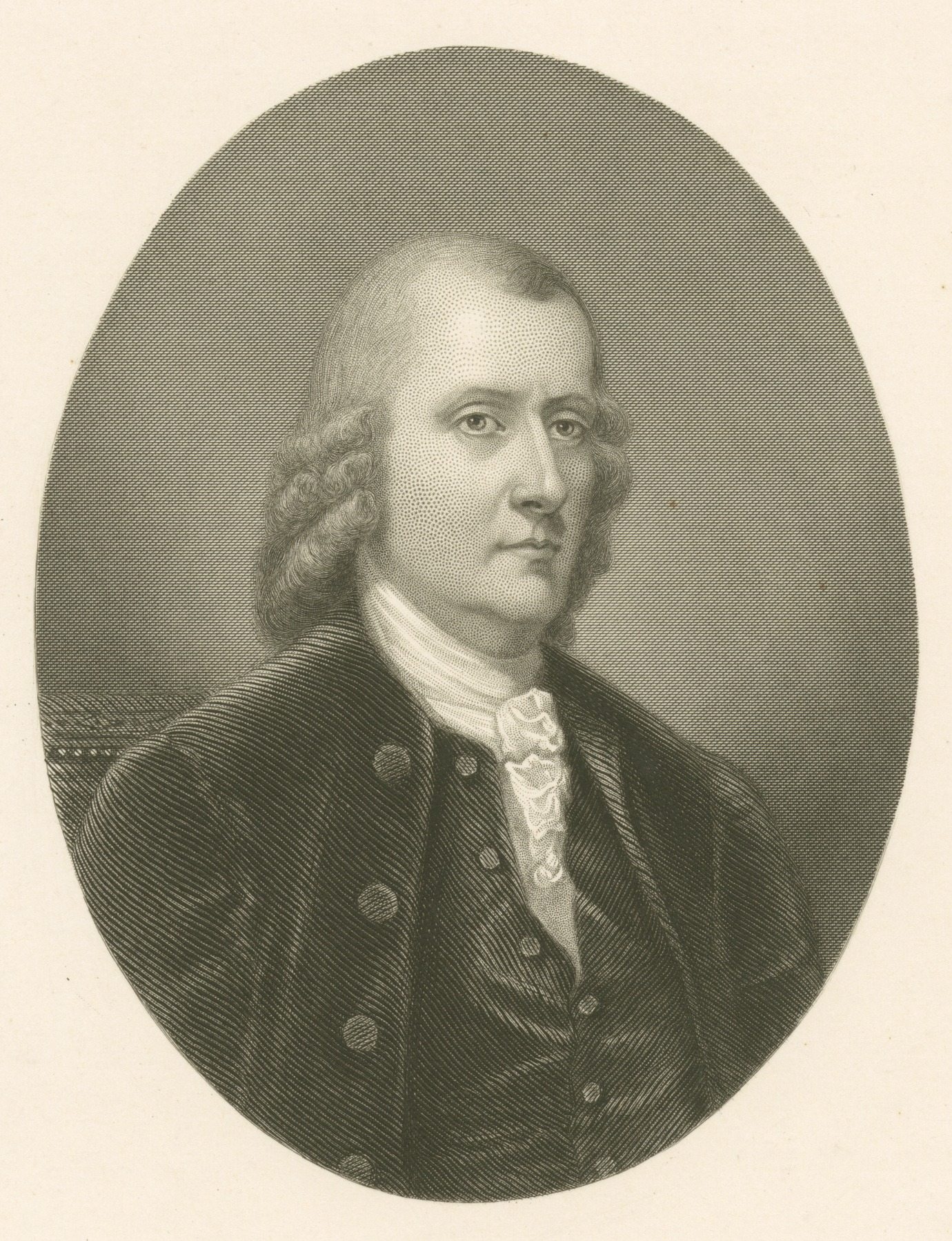
John Cruger Jr. born 18 July

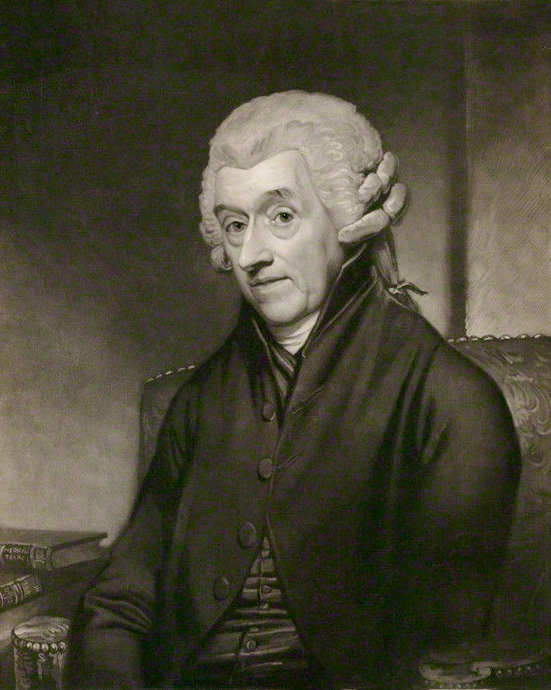
William Heberden born 13 August

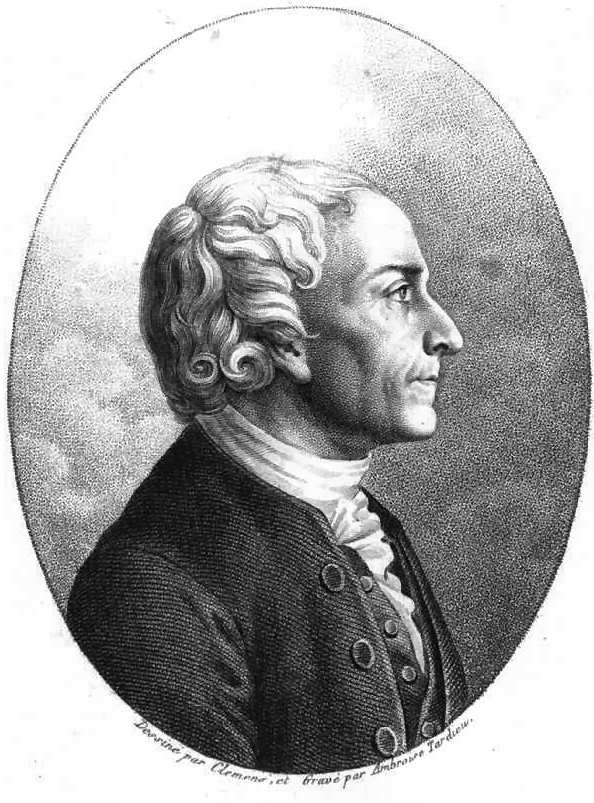
Abraham Trembley born 3 September

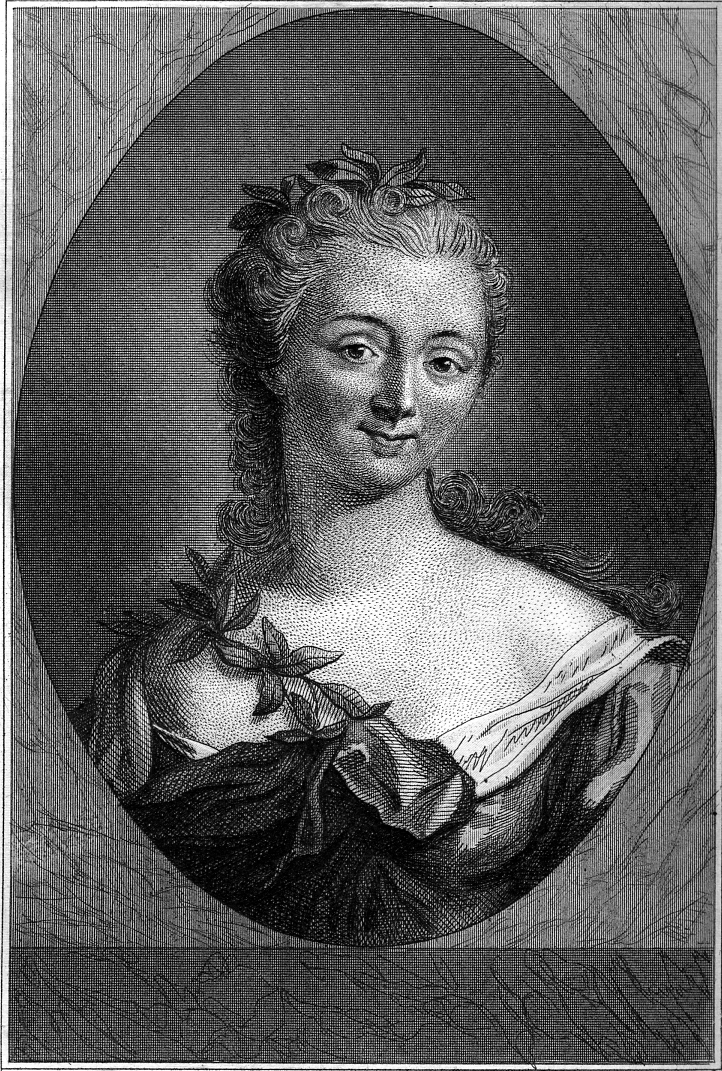
Anne-Marie du Boccage born 22 October

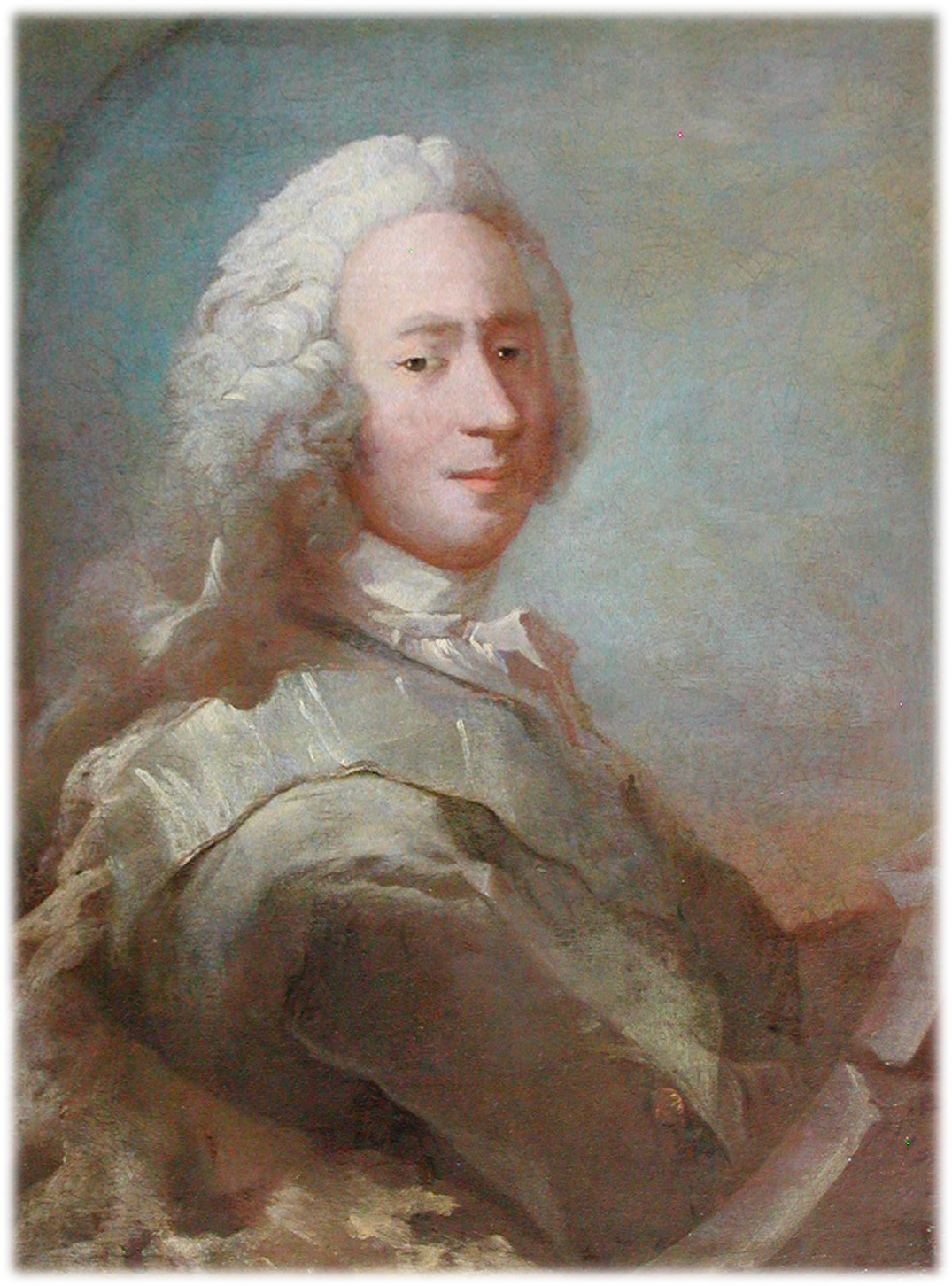
Adam Gottlob Moltke born 10 November

Paolo Renier born 21 November

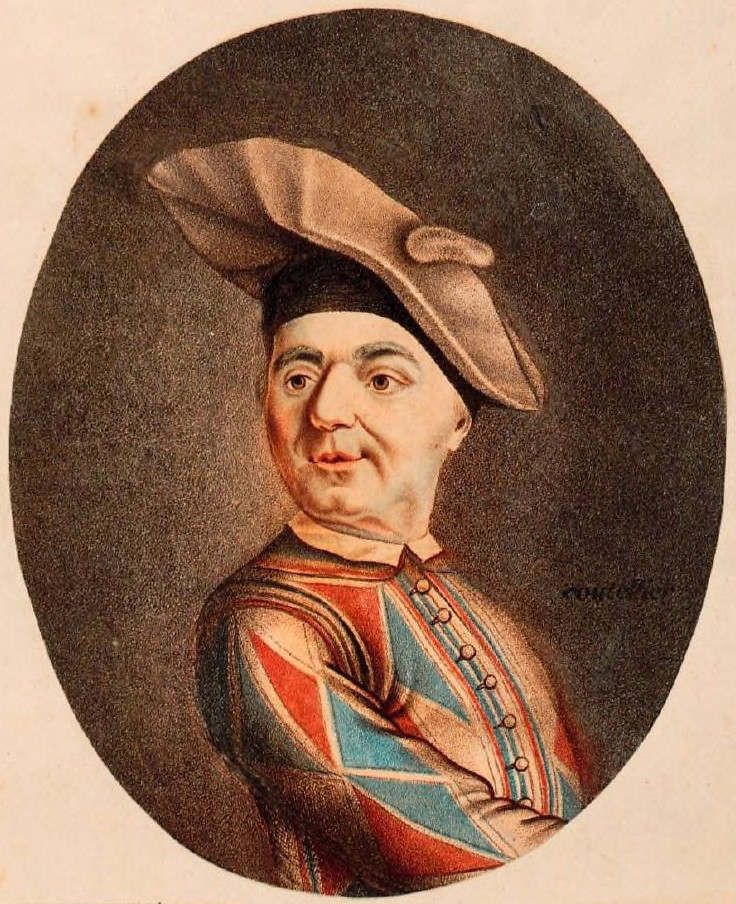
Carlo Bertinazzi born 2 December

=== January–March ===
- January 3 – Richard Gridley, American Revolutionary soldier (d. 1796)
- January 4
  - Margravine Sophie Christine of Brandenburg-Bayreuth (d. 1739)
  - Giovanni Battista Pergolesi, Italian composer (d. 1736)
- January 5 – Friedrich Wilhelm Riedt, German flautist (d. 1783)
- January 16 – Sir William Ashburnham, 4th Baronet, Church of England priest and baronet (d. 1797)
- January 23 – Jakob Langebek, Danish historian (d. 1775)
- January 28 – Jean-Martial Frédou, French portrait painter (d. 1795)
- January 30
  - Septimus Robinson, British Army officer who became Gentleman Usher of the Black Rod (d. 1765)
  - Raimondo di Sangro, Italian nobleman (d. 1771)
- February 1 – Konrad Ernst Ackermann, German actor (d. 1771)
- February 12 – John Affleck, British Tory politician (d. 1776)
- February 15 – King Louis XV, Bourbon monarch who ruled as King of France and of Navarre 1715–1774 (d. 1774)
- February 21 – Willem van Haren, Dutch nobleman and poet (d. 1768)
- February 28 – Peter Delmé, wealthy English merchant and landowner (d. 1770)
- March 3 – Johann Sigismund Mörl, German theologian (d. 1791)
- March 4 – Aert Schouman, painter from the Dutch Republic (d. 1792)
- March 7 – Casto Innocenzio Ansaldi, Italian professor (d. 1780)
- March 10 – Christian Ditlev Reventlow, Danish Privy Councillor (d. 1775)
- March 15 – George Forbes, 4th Earl of Granard, Irish soldier and politician (d. 1769)
- March 18 – Ezekiel Worthen, New Hampshire native who participated in the American Revolutionary War (d. 1793)
- March 19 – Otto Didrik Schack, 3rd Count of Schackenborg, Danish nobleman and enfeoffed count (d. 1741)
- March 26 – Louis Guillouet, comte d'Orvilliers (d. 1792)
- March 27 – Joseph Abaco, Italian violoncellist and composer (d. 1805)

=== April–June ===
- April 2 – Samuel White, lawyer in the Province of Massachusetts Bay (d. 1769)
- April 4
  - György Klimó, Bishop of Pécs and founder of the Klimo Library and printing press (d. 1777)
  - Edmund Lechmere, British politician (d. 1805)
- April 10 – George Charles Dyhern, Saxon general (d. 1759)
- April 12 – Caffarelli, Italian castrato and opera singer (d. 1783)
- April 13 – Jonathan Carver, colonial American military officer (d. 1780)
- April 15
  - Marie-Anne de Cupis de Camargo, French dancer (d. 1770)
  - William Cullen, Scottish physician and chemist (d. 1790)
- April 17 – Henry Erskine, 10th Earl of Buchan, British Freemason (d. 1767)
- April 18 – Friedrich Bogislav von Tauentzien, Prussian general during the wars of King Frederick the Great (d. 1791)
- April 20 – Jean-Joseph Sue, French surgeon and anatomist (d. 1792)
- April 23 – John Tempest Sr., landowner and Member of Parliament (d. 1776)
- April 24 – Louis-Philippe Mariauchau d'Esgly, eighth bishop of the diocese of Quebec (d. 1788)
- April 25 – James Ferguson, Scottish astronomer (d. 1776)
- April 26 – Thomas Reid, Scottish philosopher (d. 1796)
- April 30 – Johann Kaspar Basselet von La Rosée, Bavarian general (d. 1795)
- May 6 – Richard Bland, American planter and statesman from Virginia (d. 1776)
- May 8
  - Charles Hope-Weir, Scottish politician (d. 1791)
  - Peter Anton von Verschaffelt, Flemish sculptor and architect (d. 1793)
- May 10 – François Bonamy, French botanist and physician (d. 1786)
- May 14 – Adolf Frederick, King of Sweden (d. 1771)
- May 16
  - Joan Gideon Loten, Governor of Zeylan, Fellow of the Royal Society (d. 1789)
  - Lorenzo Peracino, Italian painter active near Novara in northern Italy (d. 1789)
  - William Talbot, 1st Earl Talbot, English politician (d. 1782)
- May 18
  - Johann II Bernoulli, youngest of the three sons of Johann Bernoulli (d. 1790)
  - Vere Poulett, 3rd Earl Poulett (d. 1788)
  - Charles Willing, Philadelphia merchant (d. 1754)
- May 21 – Thomas Thynne, 2nd Viscount Weymouth (d. 1751)
- May 23 – François Gaspard Adam, French rococo sculptor (d. 1761)
- June 6 – Andrea Scacciati, Italian painter (b. 1642)
- June 10 – James Short, Scottish mathematician and optician (d. 1768)
- June 14 – Peder Kofod Ancher, Danish jurist (d. 1788)
- June 15 – Robert Oliver, priest (d. 1784)
- June 18 – Klaas Annink, notorious Dutch serial killer in Twente, Netherlands (d. 1775)

=== July–September ===
- July 4 – Thomas Hay, 9th Earl of Kinnoull (d. 1787)
- July 10 – Robert O'Callaghan, politician (d. 1761)
- July 11 – Sir John Morgan, 4th Baronet (d. 1767)
- July 18 – John Cruger Jr., speaker of the Province of New York assembly, Mayor of New York City (d. 1791)
- July 21 – Paul Möhring, German physician and scientist (d. 1792)
- July 23 – Jonathan Belcher, British-American lawyer (d. 1776)
- July 26 – John Lambton, senior officer in the British Army and MP (d. 1794)
- July 31 – Jacob Houblon, British landowner and Tory politician (d. 1770)
- August 6 – Frances Jones, colonist (d. 1785)
- August 10 – Princess Luise Dorothea of Saxe-Meiningen, member of German royalty (d. 1767)
- August 13
  - Margrave Frederick of Brandenburg-Schwedt, second son of Margrave Albert Frederick (d. 1741)
  - William Heberden, English physician (d. 1801)
  - Andrés Fernández Pacheco, 10th Duke of Escalona, Spanish aristocrat and academician (d. 1746)
- August 14 – Corbyn Morris, English official and economic writer (d. 1779)
- August 18 – Landon Carter, American planter from Lancaster County (d. 1778)
- August 19 – Charles Wyndham, 2nd Earl of Egremont (d. 1763)
- August 20 – Thomas Simpson, British mathematician (d. 1761)
- August 22 – Johann August Nahl, German sculptor and plasterer (d. 1781)
- August 27
  - Joseph Tiefenthaler, Jesuit missionary, one of the earliest European geographers to write about India (d. 1785)
  - Giuseppe Vasi, Italian engraver and architect (d. 1782)
- August 28 – Pierre Augustin Boissier de Sauvages, French naturalist, researcher in provençal dialect and encyclopédist (d. 1795)
- September 3 – Abraham Trembley, Genevan naturalist (d. 1784)
- September 9 – Friedrich Rudolf von Rothenburg, lieutenant general (d. 1751)
- September 11 – Louis Frederick of Saxe-Hildburghausen, Prince, General Field Marshal in the Bavarian army (d. 1759)
- September 22 – Georg Matthias Bose, famous early experimenter in electrostatics (d. 1761)
- September 24 – William Bull II, landowner (d. 1791)
- September 25
  - Augustin Ehrensvärd, Swedish military officer (d. 1772)
  - Charles-François Racot de Grandval, French actor and playwright (d. 1784)
- September 29
  - Johann Andreas Michael Nagel, German Hebrew scholar and Orientalist (d. 1788)
  - Pompilio Maria Pirrotti, Italian Roman Catholic priest and a professed member of the Piarists (d. 1766)
- September 30 – John Russell, 4th Duke of Bedford, British statesman (d. 1771)

=== October–December ===
- October 3 – Jean Robert Tronchin, Attorney General, member of the State Council of Geneva (d. 1793)
- October 7 – François-Josué de La Corne Dubreuil, officer in the colonial regular troops of New France and (d. 1759)
- October 11 – Christophe-Gabriel Allegrain, French sculptor who tempered a neoclassical style with Rococo charm and softness (d. 1795)
- October 12 – Jonathan Trumbull, Governor of the Colony and the state of Connecticut (d. 1785)
- October 13 – Alban Butler, English Roman Catholic priest and hagiographer (d. 1773)
- October 16 – András Hadik, Austro-Hungarian general (d. 1790)
- October 19 – Franz Karl Ludwig von Wied zu Neuwied, lieutenant general in Frederick the Great's army (d. 1765)
- October 22 – Anne-Marie du Boccage, French writer (d. 1802)
- October 26 – Lukrecija Bogašinović Budmani, Serb-catholic poet (d. 1784)
- October 31 – Ole Tidemand, Norwegian theologian and priest (d. 1778)
- November 2 – Andrea Negroni, Italian Cardinal who was Cardinal-Deacon of the titular Church of Santi Vito (d. 1789)
- November 4 – Charles-François Tarieu de La Naudière, officer in the colonial regular troops and seigneur in Lower Canada (d. 1776)
- November 6 – David McGregore, Presbyterian minister and member of the Colonial America Christian Clergy (d. 1777)
- November 8 – Sarah Fielding, English author, sister of the novelist Henry Fielding (d. 1768)
- November 10 – Adam Gottlob Moltke, Danish statesman (d. 1792)
- November 13 – Charles Simon Favart, French playwright (d. 1792)
- November 19
  - Johann Wilhelm Hoffmann, German historian (d. 1739)
  - Giovanni Andrea Lazzarini, Italian painter (d. 1801)
- November 21
  - Johann Ernst Gotzkowsky, Prussian merchant with a successful trade in trinkets (d. 1775)
  - Paolo Renier, Venetian statesman (d. 1789)
- November 22 – Wilhelm Friedemann Bach, German composer (d. 1784)
- November 27 – Robert Lowth, English bishop and grammarian (d. 1787)
- November 28 – Henry Hyde, Viscount Cornbury (d. 1753)
- December 1 – Michele Marieschi, Italian painter and engraver (d. 1744)
- December 2 – Carlo Bertinazzi, Italian actor and writer (d. 1783)
- December 5 – Nicolò Porta, Italian painter of the late-Baroque period (d. 1784)
- December 15 – Francesco Zahra, Maltese painter (d. 1773)
- December 24 – Tibout Regters, portrait painter from the Northern Netherlands (d. 1768)
- December 28 – Henrik Teofilus Scheffer, Swedish chemist (d. 1759)
- date unknown – Ahmad bin Said al-Busaidi, first ruler of the Al Said Dynasty of Oman (d. 1783)

== Deaths ==
- January 4 – Sir Richard Newdigate, 2nd Baronet, English landowner (b. 1644)
- January 6 – Thomas Fairfax, 5th Lord Fairfax of Cameron, English politician (b. 1657)
- January 16 – Emperor Higashiyama of Japan (b. 1675)
- January 28 – Philip Verheyen, Flemish physician (b. 1648)
- January 21
  - John Ashburnham, 1st Baron Ashburnham, English politician (b. 1656)
  - Johann Georg Gichtel, German mystic (b. 1638)
- January 30
  - Madeleine Boullogne, French painter (b. 1646)
  - Sebastian Valfrè, Italian Oratorian priest (b. 1629)
- February 16 – Esprit Fléchier, French writer and Bishop of Nîmes (b. 1632)
- February 17 – George Bull, English theologian and Bishop of St David's (b. 1634)
- February 20 – Johan Vibe, Norwegian noble (b. 1637)
- February 25 – Daniel Greysolon, Sieur du Lhut, French explorer (b. c. 1639)
- March 4 – Louis III, Prince of Condé (b. 1668)
- March 5 – John Holt, English politician (b. 1642)
- March 14 – Michel Bégon, French ancien regime official (b. 1638)
- March 28 – Charles Fanshawe, 4th Viscount Fanshawe, English politician (b. 1643)
- April 7 – Sir Richard Bulkeley, 2nd Baronet of England (b. 1660)
- April 28 – Thomas Betterton, English actor (b. c. 1635)
- May 13 – Henry, Duke of Saxe-Römhild (b. 1650)
- May 29
  - John Dolben, British politician (b. 1662)
  - Henri Basnage de Beauval, French historian, lexicographer (b. 1657)
- June 1 – David Mitchell, British admiral (b. 1642)
- June 4 – James Stuart, 1st Earl of Bute (b. 1661)
- June 7 – Louise de La Vallière, mistress of King Louis XIV of France (b. 1644)
- July 2 – Domenico Freschi, Italian opera composer, Catholic priest (b. 1634)
- July 12 – Robert Treat, American colonial leader (b. 1624)
- July 25 – Gottfried Kirch, German astronomer, first 'Astronomer Royal' in Berlin (b. 1639)

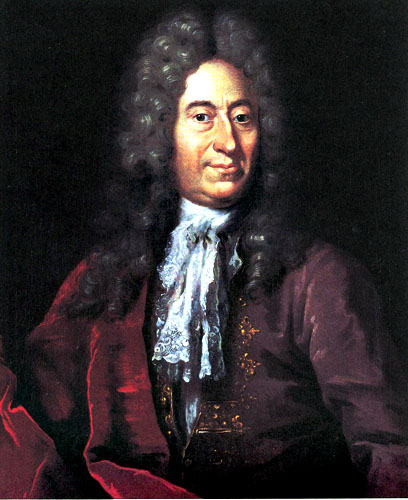
Ole Rømer

- September 19 – Ole Rømer, Danish astronomer (b. 1644)
- September 22 – Jacques-René de Brisay de Denonville, Marquis de Denonville (b. 1637)
- September 24 – Charles Berkeley, 2nd Earl of Berkeley, English diplomat (b. 1649)
- September 26 – Sir Robert Kemp, 2nd Baronet, English politician (b. 1627)
- October 19 – Suzanne Henriette of Lorraine, French noblewoman, Duchess of Mantua and Montferrat (b. 1686)
- November 3 – Maria de Croll, Swedish vocalist
- November 21 – Bernardo Pasquini, Italian composer of operas (b. 1637)
- December 15 – Albert Anton, Prince of Schwarzburg-Rudolstadt (b. 1641)
- December 18 – Petrus Codde, Dutch cleric, first Old Catholic bishop (b. 1648)
- date unknown – Anna Maria Thelott, Swedish artist (b. 1683)
