= 1784 =

1784 in various calendars
- Gregorian calendar: 1784; MDCCLXXXIV
- Ab urbe condita: 2537
- Armenian calendar: 1233; ԹՎ ՌՄԼԳ
- Assyrian calendar: 6534
- Balinese saka calendar: 1705–1706
- Bengali calendar: 1190–1191
- Berber calendar: 2734
- British Regnal year: 24 Geo. 3 – 25 Geo. 3
- Buddhist calendar: 2328
- Burmese calendar: 1146
- Byzantine calendar: 7292–7293
- Chinese calendar: 癸卯年 (Water Rabbit); 4481 or 4274 — to — 甲辰年 (Wood Dragon); 4482 or 4275
- Coptic calendar: 1500–1501
- Discordian calendar: 2950
- Ethiopian calendar: 1776–1777
- Hebrew calendar: 5544–5545
- Hindu calendars
- Vikram Samvat: 1840–1841
- Shaka Samvat: 1705–1706
- Kali Yuga: 4884–4885
- Holocene calendar: 11784
- Igbo calendar: 784–785
- Iranian calendar: 1162–1163
- Islamic calendar: 1198–1199
- Japanese calendar: Tenmei 4 (天明４年)
- Javanese calendar: 1710–1711
- Julian calendar: Gregorian minus 11 days
- Korean calendar: 4117
- Minguo calendar: 128 before ROC 民前128年
- Nanakshahi calendar: 316
- Thai solar calendar: 2326–2327
- Tibetan calendar: ཆུ་མོ་ཡོས་ལོ་ (female Water-Hare); 1910 or 1529 or 757 — to — ཤིང་ཕོ་འབྲུག་ལོ་ (male Wood-Dragon); 1911 or 1530 or 758

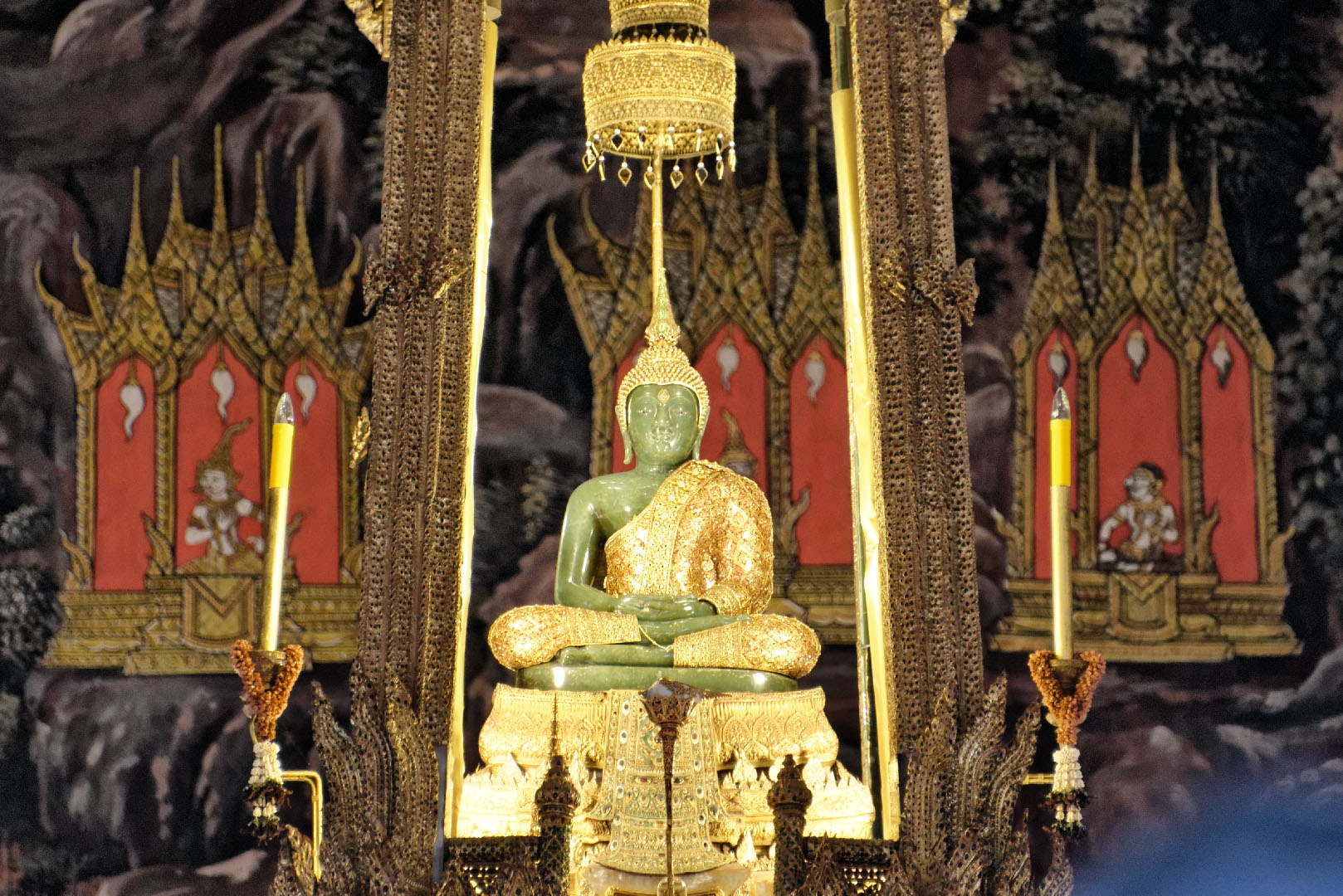
March 22: The Emerald Buddha is installed at the Wat Phra Kaew

1784 (MDCCLXXXIV) was a leap year starting on Thursday of the Gregorian calendar and a leap year starting on Monday of the Julian calendar, the 1784th year of the Common Era (CE) and Anno Domini (AD) designations, the 784th year of the 2nd millennium, the 84th year of the 18th century, and the 5th year of the 1780s decade. As of the start of 1784, the Gregorian calendar was 11 days ahead of the Julian calendar, which remained in localized use until 1923.

== Events ==
=== January–March ===
- January 6 – Treaty of Constantinople: The Ottoman Empire agrees to Russia's annexation of the Crimea.
- January 14 – The Congress of the United States ratifies the Treaty of Paris with Great Britain to end the American Revolution, with the signature of President of Congress Thomas Mifflin.
- January 15 – Henry Cavendish's paper to the Royal Society of London, Experiments on Air, reveals the molecular composition of water.
- February 24 – The Captivity of Mangalorean Catholics at Seringapatam begins.
- February 28 – John Wesley ordains ministers for the Methodist Church in the United States.
- March 1 – The Confederation Congress accepts Virginia's cession of all rights to the Northwest Territory and to Kentucky (Illinois County).
- March 22 – The Emerald Buddha is installed at the Wat Phra Kaew, on the grounds of the Grand Palace in Bangkok (or in 1785).

=== April–June ===
- April 23 – The Congress of the Confederation passes the Ordinance of Governance to set guidelines for adding to the original 13 states in the United States of America.
- April 27 – The Marriage of Figaro, written by playwright Pierre Beaumarchais as a sequel to The Barber of Seville, premieres at the Comédie-Française in Paris.
- May 12 – The Treaty of Paris (signed on September 3 the previous year, officially ending the War of American Independence) comes into effect.
- May 20 – A treaty is signed in Paris between the Kingdom of Great Britain and the Dutch Republic, formally ending the Fourth Anglo-Dutch War.
- June 4 – Élisabeth Thible is the first woman to ascend in a hot-air balloon, at Lyon, France.

=== July–September ===
- July 9 – The Bank of New York opens as the first in New York state and continues to operate under that name for almost 223 years until being acquired by Mellon Financial and becoming BNY Mellon.
- July 29 – The United States and the Kingdom of France sign a convention for establishing diplomatic relations and "determining the functions and prerogatives of their respective consuls, vice consuls, agents, and commissaries".
- August 13 – Parliament of Great Britain passes Pitt's India Act (An Act for the better Regulation and Management of the Affairs of the East India Company and of the British Possessions in India). It requires the governor-general to be chosen from outside the Company and makes company directors subject to parliamentary supervision.
- August 16 – Britain creates the colony of New Brunswick.
- September 19 – In France, the Robert brothers (Anne-Jean Robert and Nicolas-Louis Robert) and a Mr. Collin-Hullin (whose first name is lost to history) become the first people to fly more than 100 km or 100 miles in the air, lifting off from Paris and landing 6 hours and 40 minutes later near Bethune after a journey of 186 kilometres (116 mi).
- September 22 – Russia establishes a colony at Kodiak, Alaska.

=== October–December ===
- October 8 – "Kettle War", a 1-day action on the Scheldt in which a ship of the Dutch Republic repels forces of the Holy Roman Empire.
- October 22 – North Carolina rescinds its resolution ceding its western territory (Washington District, modern-day Tennessee) to the United States, after earlier giving Congress two years to accept the terms.
- October 31–December 14 – The Revolt of Horea, Cloșca and Crișan in Transylvania causes Joseph II, Holy Roman Emperor to suspend the Hungarian Constitution.
- November 26 – The Roman Catholic Apostolic Prefecture of the United States is established.
- November 27 – The phenomenon of black holes is first posited in a paper by John Michell, in the Philosophical Transactions of the Royal Society of London.
- November 30 – Richard Henry Lee of Virginia is selected as the new President of the Confederation Congress.
- December – Immanuel Kant's essay "Answering the Question: What Is Enlightenment?" is published.
- December 25 – The Methodist Episcopal Church in the United States is officially formed at the "Christmas Conference", led by Thomas Coke and Francis Asbury.

=== Date unknown ===
- Britain receives its first bales of imported American cotton.
- King Charles III of Spain authorizes land grants in Alta California.
- Princess Yekaterina Vorontsova-Dashkova is named first president of the newly created Russian Academy.
- The North Carolina General Assembly incorporates the town of Morgansborough, named for Daniel Morgan. The town is designated as the county seat for Burke County, North Carolina and is subsequently renamed Morgan, later shortened to Morganton.
- The North Carolina General Assembly changes the name of Kingston, North Carolina, originally named for King George III of Great Britain, to Kinston.
- Great Tenmei famine in Edo period Japan continues, as 300,000 die of starvation.
- A huge locust swarm hits South Africa.
- Foundation of the first theater in Estonia, the Tallinna saksa teater.
- Benjamin Franklin invents bifocal spectacles.
- Benjamin Franklin tries in vain to persuade the French to alter their clocks in winter to take advantage of the daylight.
- Antoine Lavoisier pioneers quantitative chemistry.
- Cholesterol is isolated.
- Carl Friedrich Gauss pioneers the field of summation with the formula summing at the age of 7.
- Madame du Coudray, pioneer of modern midwifery, retires.

== Births ==
- January 17 – Philippe Antoine d’Ornano, Marshal of France (d. 1863)

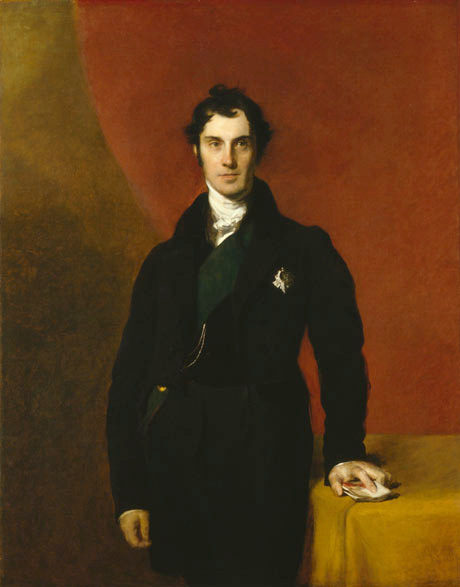
George Hamilton-Gordon, 4th Earl of Aberdeen

- January 28 – George Hamilton-Gordon, 4th Earl of Aberdeen, Prime Minister of the United Kingdom (d. 1860)
- February 5 – Nancy Hanks, mother of Abraham Lincoln (d. 1818)
- February 20 – John E. Wool, general officer in the United States Army, who served during the War of 1812, Mexican–American War, and the American Civil War (d. 1869)
- February 29 – Leo von Klenze, German neoclassicist architect, painter and writer (d. 1864)
- March 12 – William Buckland, English geologist, paleontologist (d. 1856)
- March 22 – Samuel Hunter Christie, English physicist, mathematician (d. 1865)
- March 23 – Tom Molineaux, African-American boxer (d. 1818)

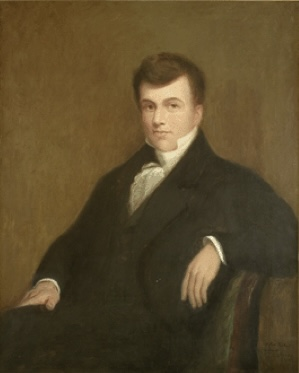
Jonathan Jennings

- March 27 – Jonathan Jennings, American politician and the first governor of Indiana (d. 1834)
- April 5 – Louis Spohr, German violinist, composer (d. 1859)
- April 13 – Friedrich Graf von Wrangel, Prussian field marshal (d. 1877)
- April 24 – Peter Vivian Daniel, Associate Justice of the Supreme Court of the United States (d. 1860)
- June 24 – Juan Antonio Lavalleja, Uruguayan military, political figure (d. 1853)
- July 21 – Charles Baudin, French admiral (d. 1854)
- July 22 – Friedrich Bessel, German mathematician, astronomer (d. 1846)
- July 27 – Denis Davydov, Russian general, poet (d. 1839)
- August 18 – Robert Taylor, British Radical writer, freethought advocate (d. 1844)
- September 4 – William Pope Duval, first civilian governor of the Florida Territory (d. 1854)
- October 13 – King Ferdinand VII of Spain (d. 1833)
- October 15 – Thomas Robert Bugeaud, Marshal of France and duke of Isly (d. 1849)
- October 19
  - Leigh Hunt, British critic, essayist (d. 1859)
  - John McLoughlin, Canadian fur trader (d. 1857)

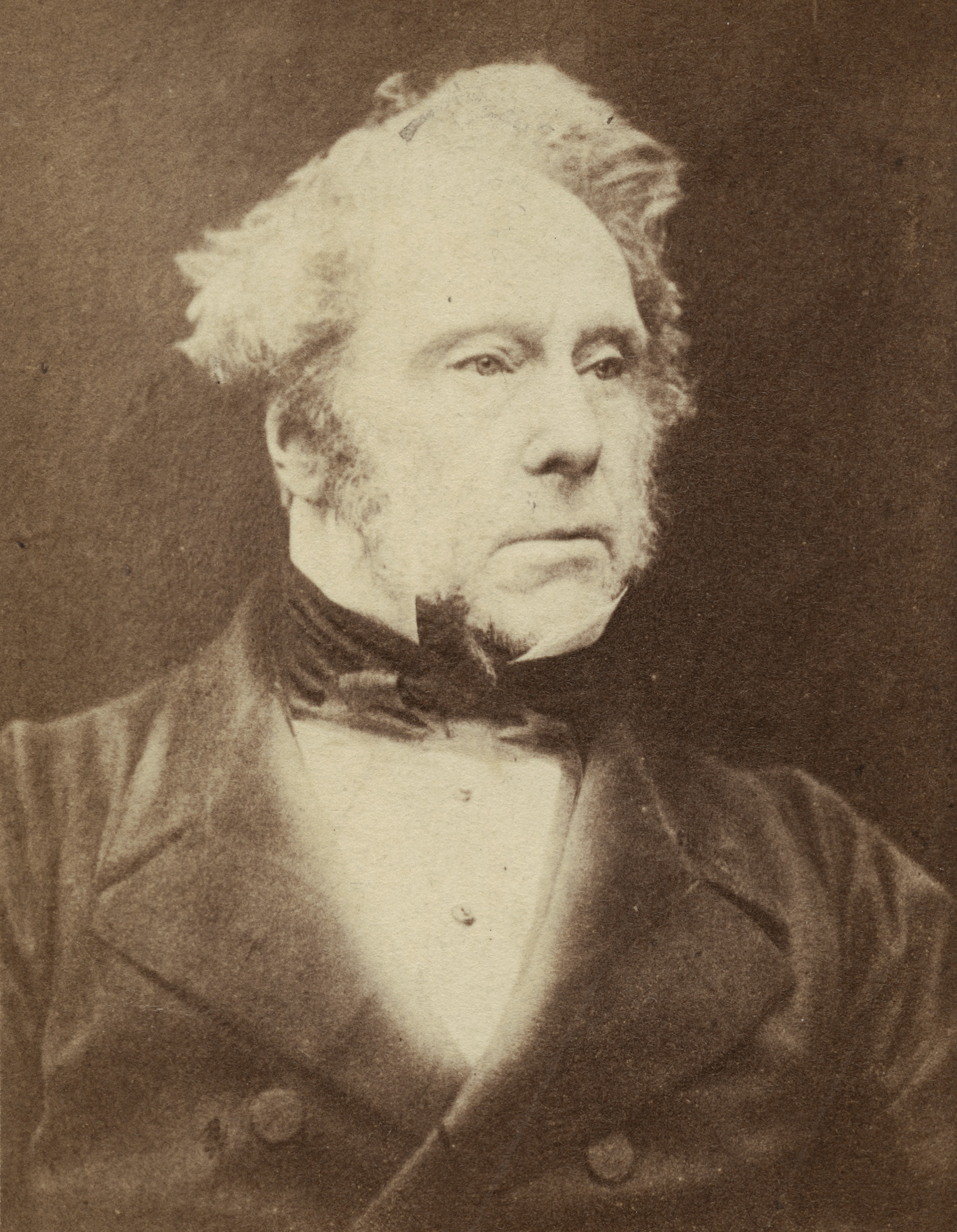
Henry Temple, 3rd Viscount Palmerston

- October 20 – Henry Temple, 3rd Viscount Palmerston, Prime Minister of the United Kingdom (d. 1865)
- October – Sarah Biffen, armless English painter (d. 1850)
- November 24 – Zachary Taylor, 12th President of the United States (d. 1850)
- November 27 – August, Prince of Hohenlohe-Öhringen (d. 1853)

== Deaths ==
- February 4 – Princess Friederike Luise of Prussia, Prussian princess (b. 1714)
- February 27 – Count of St. Germain, French philosopher, adventurer (b. 1710)
- March 26 – Thomas Bond, American physician and surgeon (b. 1712)
- March 27 – Ralph Bigland, British officer of arms (b. 1712)
- March 31 – Thomas Adam, English clergyman, religious writer (b. 1701)
- April 26 – Nano Nagle, Irish convent founder (b. 1718)
- April 29 – Agustín de Jáuregui, Spanish colonial governor (b. 1711)
- May 3 – Anthony Benezet, French-born American abolitionist and educator (b. 1713)
- May 10 – Antoine Court de Gébelin, French pastor (b. 1725)
- May 12 – Abraham Trembley, Swiss naturalist (b. 1710)
- June 8 – Lukrecija Bogašinović Budmani, Croatian poet (b. 1710)
- June 11 – Lê Quý Đôn, Vietnamese philosopher, poet, encyclopedist, and government official (b. 1726)
- June 13 – Henry Middleton, American president of the Continental Congress (b. 1717)
- June 14 – Andrzej Mokronowski, Polish general (b. 1713)
- June 26 – Caesar Rodney, American lawyer, signer of the United States Declaration of Independence (b. 1728)
- July 1 – Wilhelm Friedemann Bach, German composer (b. 1710)

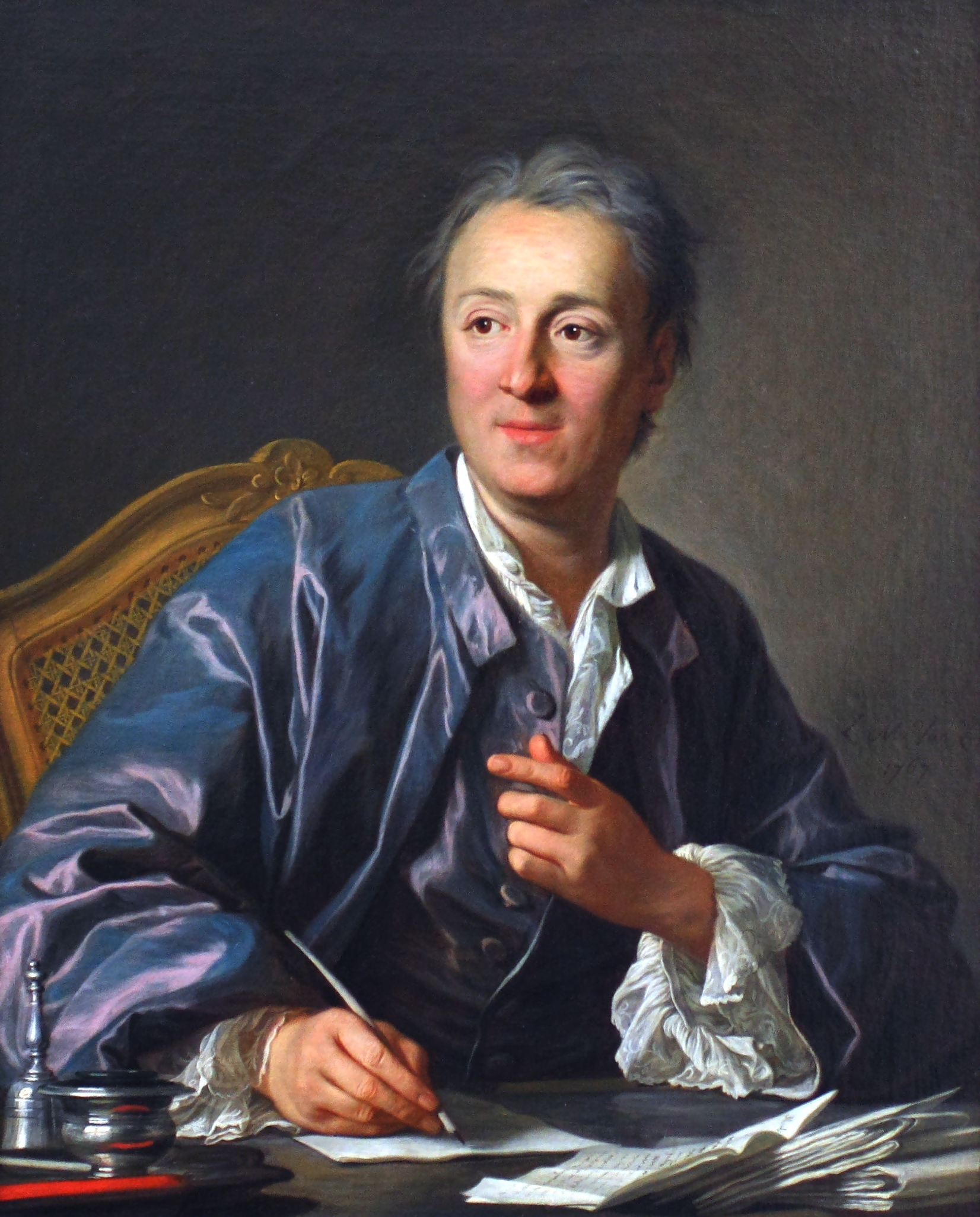
Denis Diderot

- July 31 – Denis Diderot, French philosopher, encyclopedist (b. 1713)
- August 4 – Giovanni Battista Martini, Italian musician (b. 1706)
- August 10 – Allan Ramsay, Scottish portrait-painter (b. 1713)
- August 14 – Nathaniel Hone, Irish-born painter (b. 1718)
- August 28 – Junípero Serra, Spanish Franciscan missionary (b. 1713)
- September 1 – Jean-François Séguier, French astronomer and botanist (b. 1703)
- September 4 – César-François Cassini de Thury, French astronomer (b. 1714)
- September 8 – Ann Lee, American religious leader (b. 1736)
- September 15 – Nicolas Bernard Lépicié, French painter (b. 1735)
- November 1 – Jean-Jacques Lefranc, Marquis de Pompignan, French polymath, author and poet (b. 1709)
- November 9 – George Baylor, officer in the American Continental Army (b. 1752)
- December 5 – Phillis Wheatley, first published African-American author (b. 1753)

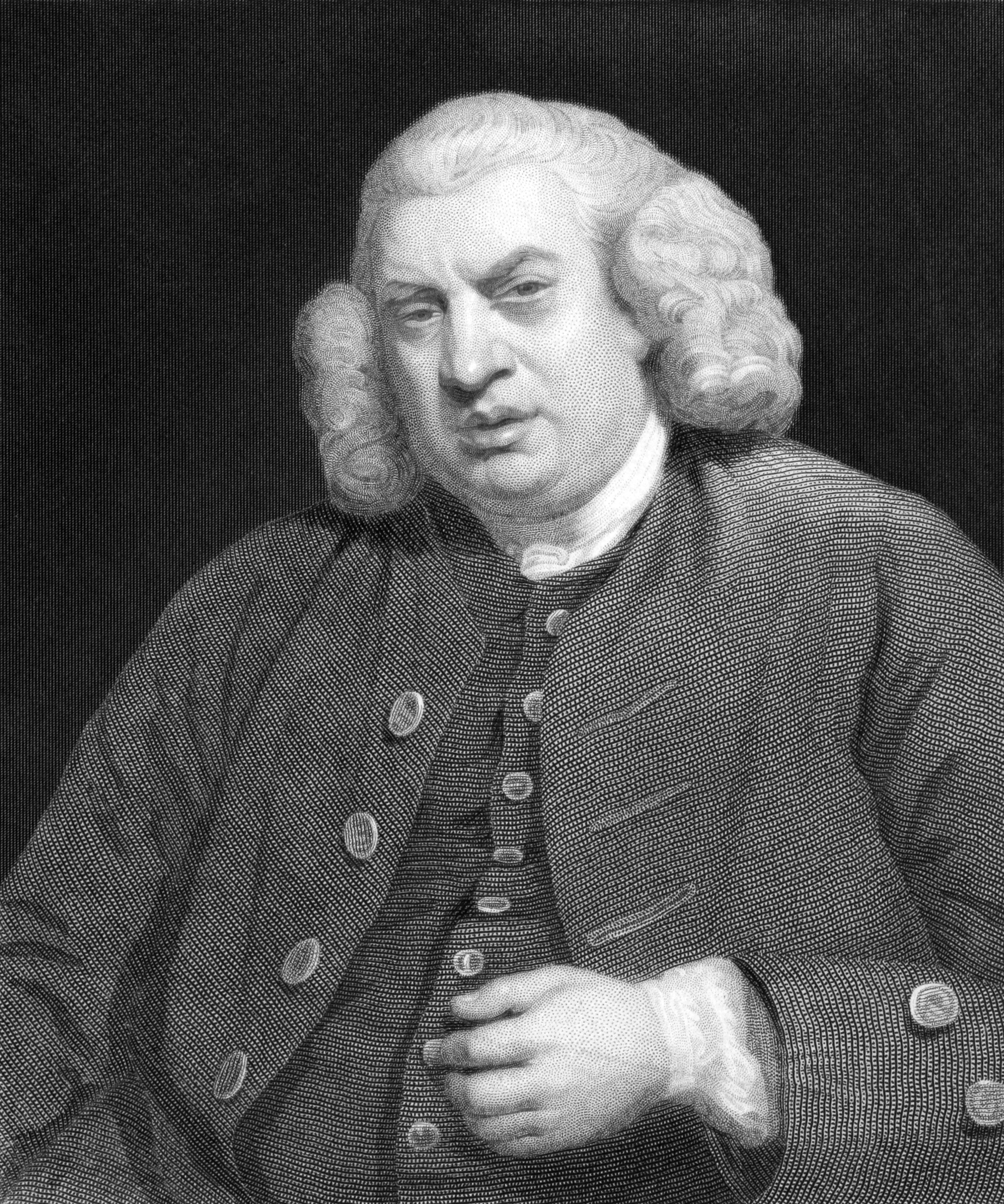
Samuel Johnson

- December 13 – Samuel Johnson, English writer, lexicographer (b. 1709)
- December 25 – Yosa Buson, Japanese poet, painter (b. 1716)
- December 26 – Seth Warner, American revolutionary leader (b. 1743)
- date unknown – Raja Haji Fisabilillah, Buginese monarch of the Johor Sultanate, warrior, emperor, and government official
- date unknown – Abd al-Karim Kashmiri, Indo-Persian historian
