= Riedt =

Riedt may refer to:

== People ==
- Friedrich Wilhelm Riedt (1710–1783), German musician

== Places ==
- Riedt bei Erlen, Switzerland
- Riedt bei Neerach, Switzerland

== Other ==
- Lisa Riedt, Brazilian beachwear manufacturer
