= Budmani =

Budmani is a surname. Notable people with the surname include:

- Lukrecija Bogašinović Budmani (1710–1784), Ragusan poet
- Pero Budmani (1835–1914), writer, linguist, grammarian, and philologist from Dubrovnik
- Simo Budmani, merchant from Dubrovnik
