= Charles-Benjamin de Lubières =

Genevan mathematician

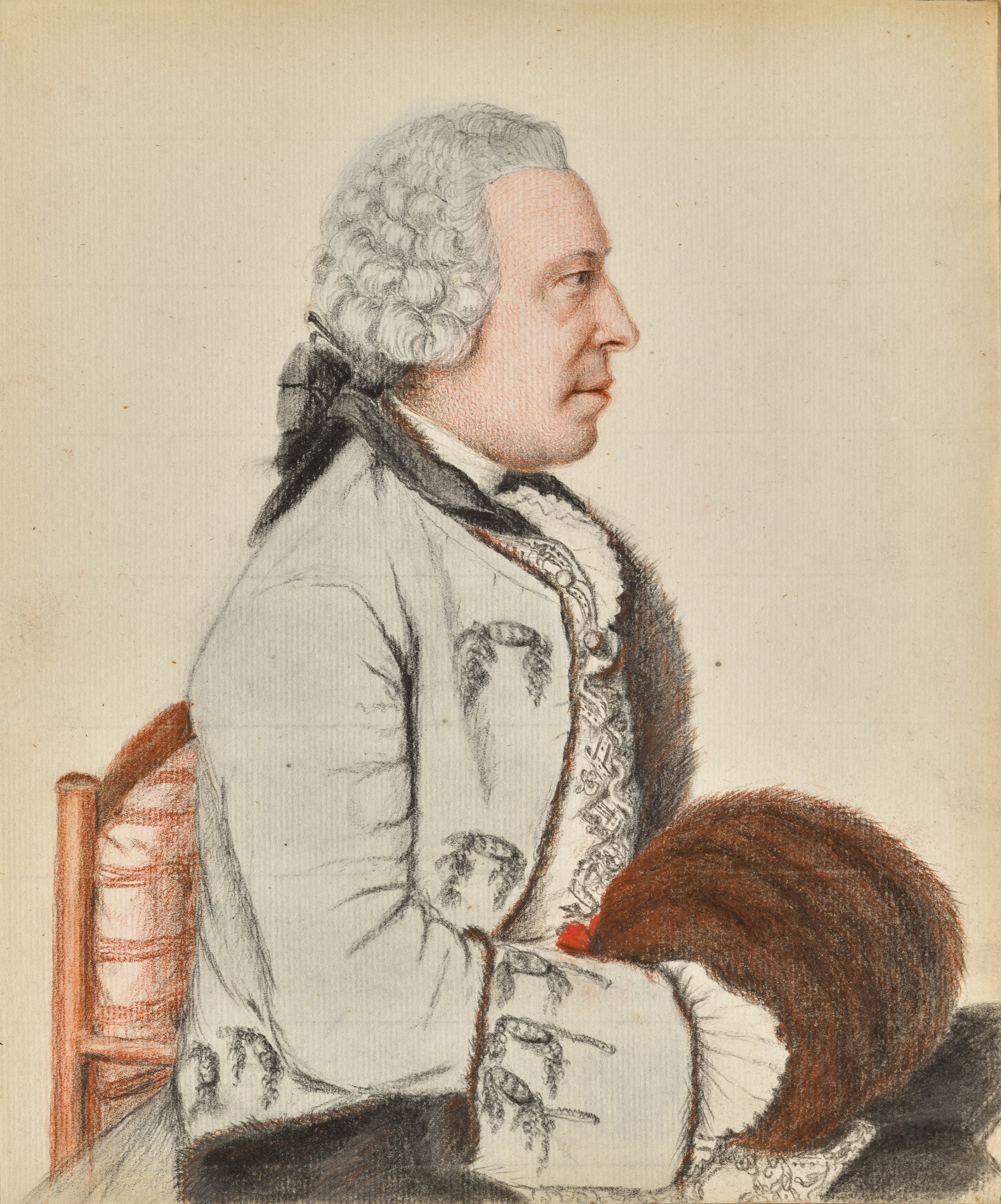
- Portrait of Charles-Benjamin de Langes de Montmirail, Baron de Lubières (J. Paul Getty Museum), by Jean-Étienne Liotard
- Born: 1714; Berlin
- Died: 1 June 1790 (aged 75–76)
- Occupation: Mathematician
- Spouse: Olympe Camp (1709-1785)

Charles-Benjamin de Langes de Montmirail, baron de Lubières, 1714, Berlin – 1 June 1790, was a Genevan mathematician.

Charles-de Lubières Benjamin was the son of François de Lange de Montmirail de Lubières (1664–1720) and Marie Calandrini (1677–1762) from Geneva. In 1703, the father left the Principality of Orange. He first fled to Geneva then to Berlin.

In 1732, he became a citizen of Geneva, and later gouverneur de Neuchâtel and in 1752, a member of the Council of Two Hundred of the Republic of Geneva. 22 October 1764, he married Genève Olympe Camp (1709–1785) in Geneva.

Lubières is the author of Éloge du mathématicien Gabriel Cramer, Relation de voyage en Italie, extracts from Essai analytique sur les facultés de l'âme, by Charles Bonnet and Considérations sur les corps organisés.

Lubières was a member of the Société des Gens de Lettres de Genève together with the mathematician and philosopher Gabriel Cramer, Jean-Louis Calandrini (1703–1758) and the attorney general Jean-Robert Tronchin (1710–1793).

He wrote the articles Probabilité, Idée, Induction for the Encyclopédie by Diderot.

== Sources ==
- Albert Choisy, Louis Théophile Dufour-Vernes et al., Recueil généalogique suisse, t. 1, Genève, A. Jullien, 1902, (p. 309).
