= Gustav Philipp Mörl =

German theologian and librarian (1673–1750)

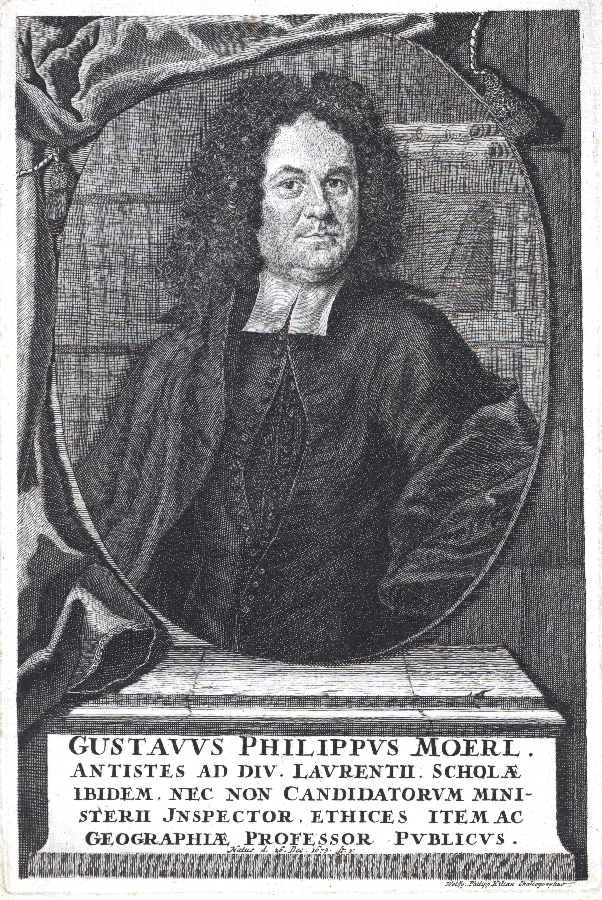
- Born: 26 December 1673; Nuremberg
- Died: 7 May 1750 (aged 76); Nuremberg
- Alma mater: University of Altdorf
- Occupation: Librarian; theologian
- Children: Johann Sigismund Mörl

Gustav Philipp Mörl or Gustav Philipp Morl; Gustavus Philippus Moerl (26 December 1673 – 7 May 1750) was a German theologian, was born in Nuremberg 26 December 1673 and was educated first in the schools of his native place and then at the university in Altdorf, where he studied philosophy and philology from 1690 to 1692, when he was removed to Jena to study theology and the ancient languages. He traveled through Holland, and visited its most important universities. After his return home he was appointed assistant of the philosophic faculty at Halle, and in 1698 became professor and ecclesiastical inspector at Altdorf. He resigned this position in 1703, and was appointed dean of St. Sebald's church at Nuremberg. In 1706 he was appointed minister of the St. Aegidien church, and inspector of the gymnasium; in 1714 minister at St. Lawrence, in connection with which he had the supervision of the ecclesiastical seminary. In 1724 he was appointed minister of the church of St. Sebald, superintendent of the consistory of Nuremberg, city librarian, and professor of divinity of the Aegidische gymnasium. He died on 7 May 1750.

Besides several dissertations in journals, he published Diss. de distinctione essentiali agnoscenda et attributis (Jenae, 1694, 4to): — Diss. continens theses miscellaneas (Halae, 1694, 4to): — Diss. continens vindicationem regularem methodi Cartesianae (ibid. 1694, 4to): — Diss. i et ii de mense humana (ibid. 1696, 1697, 4to): — Repetitio doctrinae orthodoxae de fundamento fidei, occasione disputationis Halensis de questione: An haeresis sit crimen?' (ibid. 1696, 4to): — Defensio repetitionis hujus adversus Chr. Thomasium (ibid. 1697, 4to): — Disquisitio defide, occasione epistolae ad Chr. Thomasium scriptae (ibid. 1698, 4to): — Diss. de modo dirigendi omnes actiones nostras ad gloriam Dei (Altdorf, 1701, 4to): — Vindiciae doctrinae Lutheranae de gratia proedestinationis (Norimb. 1702, 8vo): — Die Lehre von der Busse, in 122 Predigten, nach den Lehrsatzen und Texten entworfen (Nurnberg, 1711, 4to): — Ordnung der Knige in Juda und Israel, in einer Tabelle (ibid. 1740, fol.): —Sterbeschule; eine Sammlung von Predigtentwurfen (ibid. 1743, 1744, 2 volumes, fol.).
