= François Boissier de Sauvages de Lacroix =

French physician and botanist (1706-1767)

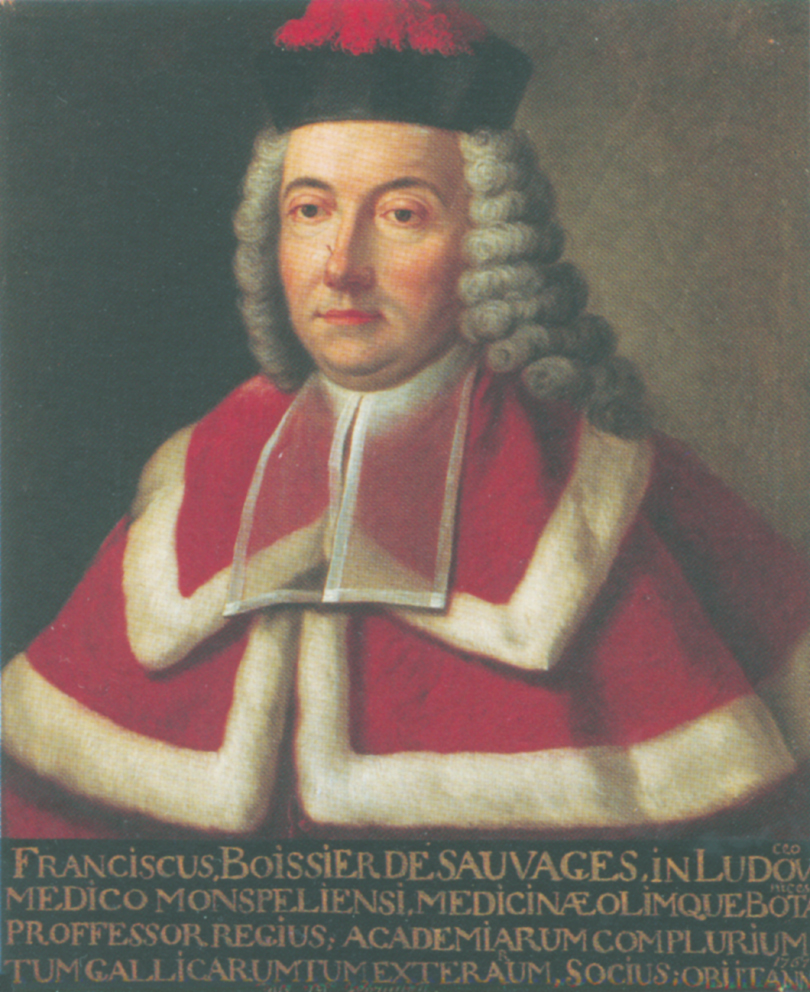
- François Boissier de Sauvages de Lacroix
- Born: May 12, 1706; Alès, Languedoc
- Died: February 19, 1767 (aged 60)
- Education: University of Montpellier
- Scientific career
- Fields: Botany

François Boissier de Sauvages de Lacroix (May 12, 1706 – February 19, 1767) was a French physician and botanist who was a native of Alès, Languedoc. He was the brother of naturalist Pierre Augustin Boissier de Sauvages (1710—1795).

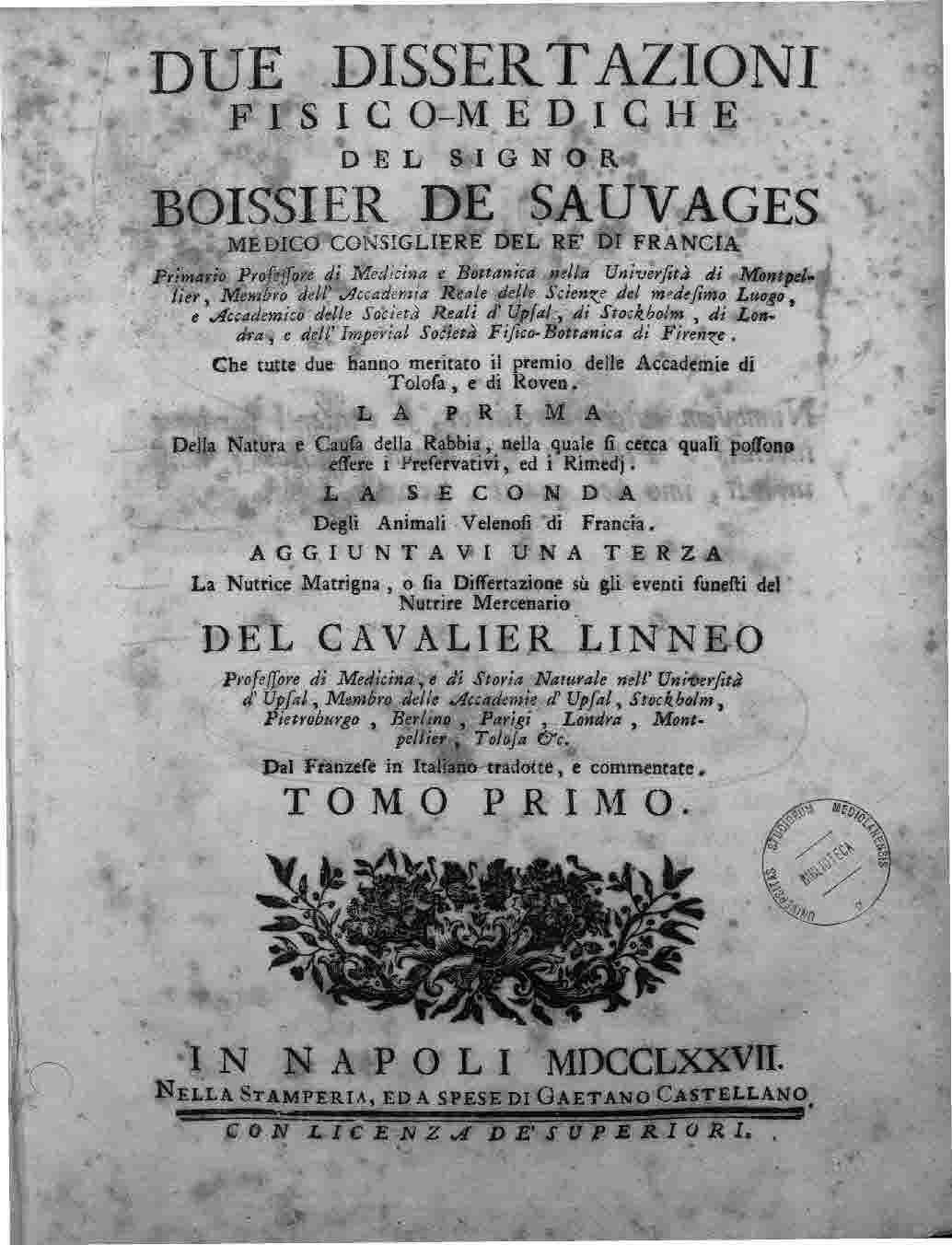
Della natura e causa della rabbia (Dissertation sur la nature et la cause de la Rage), 1777

He received his education at the University of Montpellier, where he studied botany with Pierre Baux (1708-1790). After spending a few years in Paris, he returned to Montpellier in 1734, where he served as a professor of physiology and pathology. Following the death of François Ayme Chicoyneau (1702-1740), he was named to the chair of botany. At Montpellier, he made important improvements to its botanical garden, which included construction of its first greenhouse.

He was a friend to Swedish naturalist Carl von Linné (1707—1778), to whom Sauvages de Lacroix sent botanical specimens from the Montpellier region for study. Linné designated the botanical genus Sauvagesia in honor of his French colleague. In 1748 he was elected a member of the Royal Swedish Academy of Sciences, of which Linné had been a co-founder. The following year he was elected a Fellow of the Royal Society.

As a physician, Sauvages de Lacroix is credited with establishing a methodical nosology for diseases, a classification system that was in the spirit of Thomas Sydenham's earlier work, and was in accordance with methods used by botanists. His classification system listed 10 major classes of disease, which were further broken down into numerous orders, 295 genera, and 2400 species (individual diseases). Sauvages de Lacroix explained his nosology in the 1763 treatise Nosologia Methodica, a work that reportedly was an inspiration to Philippe Pinel (1745—1826) and his early research of mental illnesses.
