= Abd al-Karim Kashmiri =

18th century Indo-Persian historian

- Born: Kashmir
- Died: 1784
- Occupation: Historian
- Writing career
- Notable work: Bayan-e vaqe

Abd al-Karim Kashmiri (died 1784) was an Indo-Persian historian who wrote the Bayan-e vaqe, a Persian chronicle mostly focused on the life of the Afsharid shah (king) of Iran, Nader Shah (r. 1736–1747).

== Biography ==
Abd al-Karim Kashmiri's early life is largely unknown. An Indo-Persian from Kashmir, Abd al-Karim Kashmiri was a resident of Shahjahanabad (Old Delhi) when the Iranian shah (king) Nader Shah (r. 1736–1747) of the Afsharid dynasty invaded the city in 1739. He started working for Nader Shah as a clerk and traveled with him back to Iran in order to make the pilgrimage to Mecca and see the tombs of Muslim saints. Following multiple expeditions in the Punjab, Sindh, Afghanistan, Khorasan, Transoxania, Khwarazm, and other regions, Nader Shah eventually arrived in the city of Qazvin in 1741. At that point, Abd al-Karim Kashmiri along with Nader Shah's physician Alavi Shirazi left travel to Mecca. He stopped at Aleppo, Karbala, and other locations along the route. After making the pilgrimage, he traveled by water from Jeddah to the port of Calcutta, arriving back in Delhi in 1743. He died in 1784.

== Bayan-e vaqe ==
It was after his return to Delhi that Abd al-Karim Kashmiri started writing his Bayan-e vaqe, which mostly focused on the life of Nader Shah, but also mentions events during his travels. His work is based on his personal observations as well as previously published histories from figures such as the Iranian historian Hazin Lahiji, and oral accounts from people Abd al-Karim Kashmiri considered trustworthy, including Alavi Shirazi, Mirza Ali Akbar, and other members of Nader Shah's entourage. Numerous Persian manuscript copies in India, Iran, and Britain, as well as an English translation shortly after the text's publication, attest to the widespread circulation of the Bayan-e vaqe in both Persian and English language societies.

Although not a poet, a Persian Hindustani like Abd al-Karim Kashmiri was exposed to the same literary collection of tropes and figures as Hazin, despite Persian literature being increasingly focused on a smaller selection of classical works considered essential or authoritative from the late 18th-century. Persian literary characters and figures—from poets to heroes, monarchs, statesmen, mystics, and lovers—appear in both of their works. Abd al-Karim Kashmiri illustrates his arguments with couplets from many poets, including Saadi Shirazi, Rumi, and Hafez, and with references to the Shahnameh and Khosrow and Shirin legends.

Abd al-Karim Kashmiri and Hazin held many of the same opinions despite their differences. They both considered the invasion of their own kingdoms and cities to be tragedies. They both hold similar historical assessments, including a dislike and contempt for Nader Shah, a feeling of political disintegration in their own kingdoms, disaster in the surrounding areas, and an appreciation of Europeans. Abd al-Karim Kashmiri and Hazin expressed similar cultural values and used historical comparisons to make ethical and recurring judgments about politics and culture, often emphasizing themes of loyalty and friendship. Because they shared a common Persian cultural tradition, they could use and adapt the same literary texts to reflect different or even opposing views on cultural values and historical interpretations.

== Sources ==
- Kia, Mana (2009). "Accounting for Difference: A Comparative Look at the Autobiographical Travel Narratives of Hazin Lāhiji and 'Abd-al-Karim Kashmiri". Journal of Persianate Studies. 2 (2). Brill: 210–236. doi:10.1163/187470909X12535030823814.
- Kia, Mana (2020). Persianate Selves: Memories of Place and Origin Before Nationalism. Stanford University Press. ISBN 978-1503611955.
- Maqbul Ahmad, S. (1982). "ʿAbd-al-Karīm Kašmīrī". In Yarshater, Ehsan (ed.). Encyclopædia Iranica (Online ed.). Encyclopædia Iranica Foundation.
- Shafi, Muhammad (1960). "ʿAbd al-Karīm Kas̲h̲mīrī". In Gibb, H. A. R.; Kramers, J. H.; Lévi-Provençal, E.; Schacht, J.; Lewis, B. & Pellat, Ch. (eds.). The Encyclopaedia of Islam, Second Edition. Volume I: A–B. Leiden: E. J. Brill. OCLC 495469456.
