= Lisa Riedt =

Brazilian clothing brand

Lisa Riedt (Ltd.) is a Brazilian beachwear brand specialized in luxury bikinis and one pieces. The brand was founded in 2003 by Elisa Riedtmann da Silva in Miami.

== Brand Positioning ==
The brand has a partnership with the yearly Art Book of the Acqualina Hotel, owned by Donald Trump in South Beach, making it the exclusive outfitter to all female models. Lisa Riedt collections are also sold in the Four Seasons Hotels in Miami and New York. In April 2014 Lisa Riedt was listed as an official partner of the Ferretti Group in their monthly magazine. As of 2014 Lisa Riedt is based in Santa Catarina, Brazil.

== See also ==
- Bikini
- Lingerie
- Swimwear
- List of swimwear brands
