= Anne-Marie du Boccage =

French writer, poet, and playwright

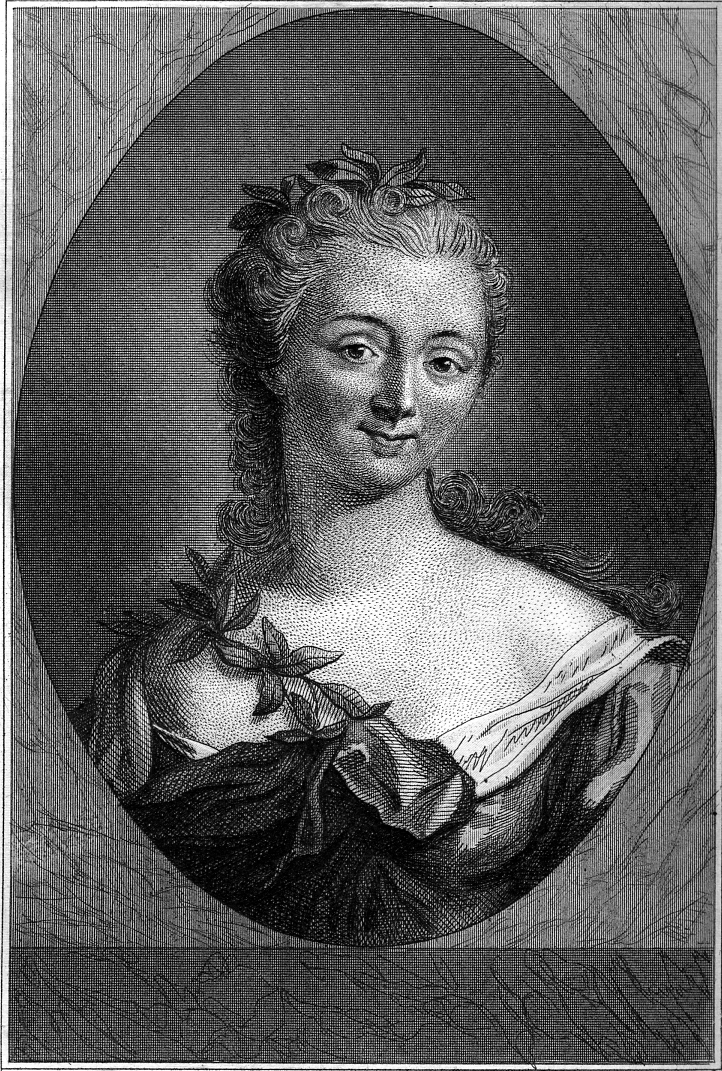
- Born: Anne-Marie Fiquet Le Page; 22 October 1710; Rouen, France
- Died: 8 August 1802 (aged 91); Paris, France
- Occupations: Writer; Playwright

Anne-Marie Fiquet du Boccage, née Le Page, (22 October 1710 – 8 August 1802) was an 18th-century French writer, poet, and playwright.

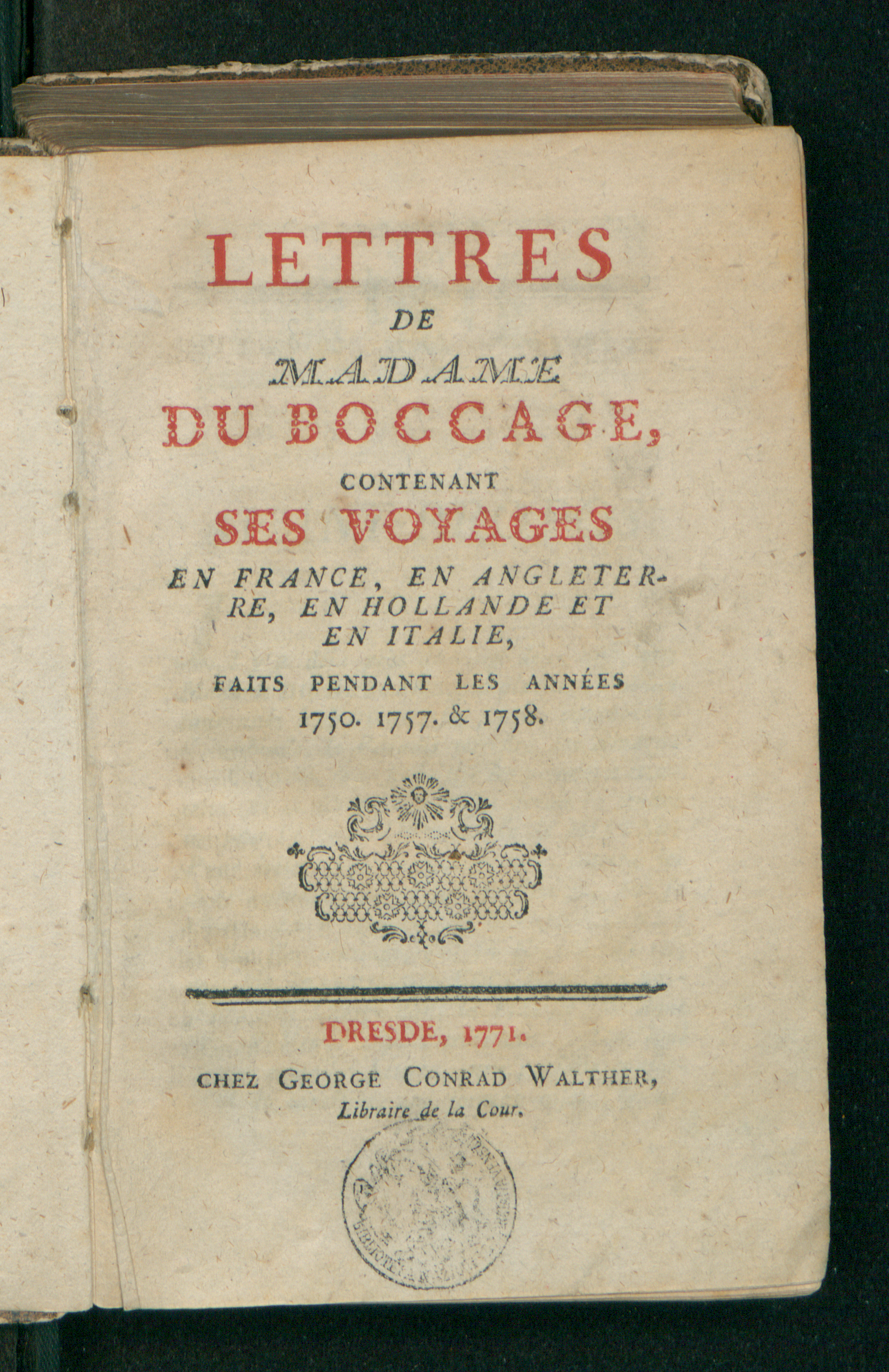
Lettres contenant ses voyages en France, en Angleterre, en Hollande et en Italie (1771)

== Life ==
Born in Rouen into the upper middle-class, she was educated in a convent in Paris. Anne-Marie Du Boccage wrote letters, poems, and plays for the stage.

In 1727, she married Pierre-Joseph Fiquet du Boccage, a 'receveur des tailles' (tax collector) and literature enthusiast. The couple knew and associated with all the literary figures of Rouen: Le Cornier de Cideville, the abbé du Resnel, Elie de Beaumont (who was to be the lawyer in the case of the Calas affair), Jeanne-Marie Leprince de Beaumont, the abbé Yart, etc.

Having settled in Paris in 1733, the Du Boccages began to establish a salon. Anne-Marie began to associate with famous figures. In July 1746, she was awarded, in what was a rare distinction for a woman, the first prize of the Rouen Academy. She sent her poem to Voltaire, who replied on 15 August 1746, addressing her as 'Sappho of Normandy'. Le Cornier de Cideville, fellow Norman and a correspondent of Voltaire's, recommended her salon to Fontenelle, who before long became one of her Sunday regulars. A member of the Académie française and the French Academy of Sciences, Fontenelle introduced her to fellow academician Marivaux, as well as to the abbé Trublet and other learned members, such as Algarotti and Clairaut.

In February 1748, she published a translation in six cantos of Milton's Paradise Lost, which she dedicated to the Rouen Academy. Voltaire and Fontenelle sang her praises, and the abbé de Bernis wrote some verse in her honour. Through this poem, she gained the public's interest and sudden fame. From the end of the 1740s until the 1760s, innumerable poems about her were published in the Mercure de France journal.

Encouraged by the success of her Paradis terrestre (Earthly paradise), Anne-Marie du Boccage decided to brave the stage with Les Amazones (The Amazons), a tragedy in verse. This was to some an unforgivable act of daring for a woman. In spite of the hostility of the public, she dug her heels in, falling ill on the eve of the premiere at the Comédie-Française on 24 July 1749, however the play was a success. Charles Collé reported that there was a full house, as if at a performance of a play by Voltaire or Crébillon in the depths of winter — although he did attribute the play to du Resnel or to Linant. Others, such as the abbé Raynal, or Baculard d'Arnaud, also blamed her for daring to tread on ground commonly occupied by male playwrights. Les Amazones was nevertheless performed eleven times, which was a success at a time when plays often fell by the wayside after a single performance.

Anne-Marie du Boccage then tried her hand at an epic poem with La Colombiade, a poem in ten cantos, which caused a stir in literary circles. Voltaire, Fréron, the Mercure de France, the Journal des savants and the Journal de Trévoux all praised it highly. It went through three editions in Paris, and was translated into English, Spanish, German and Italian.

Du Boccage's Lettres sur l'Angleterre, la Hollande et l'Italie (Letters Concerning England, Holland, and Italy, published in English in 1770 - volume 1, volume 2).

Anne-Marie du Boccage more literary prizes than any other woman of her time. After the Rouen Academy in 1756, the Academy of Lyon made her a member on 20 June 1758. When she travelled to Italy with her husband, not only was she received by the Pope, but she was the second Frenchwoman, after Emilie du Châtelet, to be admitted to the two prestigious academies of Rome and of Bologna. Her friend Algarotti arranged for her to be received in the academies of Padua, of Florence and of Cortona.

Anne-Marie du Boccage manifested a certain feminism and did not hesitate to support other women writers or artists.

== Works ==
- Lettres sur l'Angleterre et la Hollande
- La Colombiade
- Le Paradis terrestre
- Les Amazones
- Le Temple de la Renommée
- Oraison Funèbre de François Eugène, Prince de Savoye (traduction)
- Lettres sur l'Angleterre, la Hollande et l'Italie
- Recueil des œuvres de Madame du Boccage volume 1; volume 2; volume 3

== External link ==
- Works by Anne-Marie du Boccage on the Internet Archive
