= Pierre Augustin Boissier de Sauvages =

Pierre Augustin Boissier de Sauvages or François Boissier de Sauvages de Lacroix (28 August 1710, Alès – 13 December 1795) was a French naturalist, researcher in provençal dialect and encyclopédist. His brother was the physician François Boissier de Sauvages de Lacroix.

He studied theology in Paris, and later returned to his hometown of Alès, where he taught classes in sciences, philosophy and theology. In 1746 he became a member of the Société Royale des Sciences à Montpellier. In 1771 he was ordained as a priest.

== Published works ==
- Dictionnaire languedocien-françois (1756) – Languedoc-French dictionary.
- Mémoires sur l'éducation des vers à soie, (1763) – On silkworms.
- De la culture des mûriers, (1763) – The cultivation of mulberry trees.
- Observations sur l'origine du miel, (1763) – Observations on the origin of honey.
- "Directions for the breeding and management of silk-worms" (1770); (extracted from treatises by Abbé Boissier de Sauvages and Samuel Pullein; translated and epitomized by Jonathan Odell).
