= Simo Budmani =

Simo Budmani (Serbian Cyrillic: Симо Будмани; fl. 18th century) was a merchant and author from Dubrovnik who lived and worked in Novi Pazar, though intermittently traveled throughout the Balkans and the Ottoman Empire as a Levant merchant.

He is remembered for his Serbian-Italian Dictionary and also travels in the first decades of the 18th century across the Turkish Empire, and as this merchant was also interested in philology, during his long stay in Novi Pazar he accumulated much knowledge and wrote about it. At the same time, he made a fortune as a merchant-trader.

Simo Budmani is an offshoot of a Dubrovnik family that was not originally from the city, but possibly from a village in Konavle. The family was known for trading with merchants from the Levant

As a merchant travelling throughout the Balkans, Budmani got to know the regions, people and customs, and gradually acquired both wealth and knowledge. In 1722–1723, he was in Novi Pazar, in 1724 in Ruščuk, from where he traded beeswax. In 1726 he was in Wallachia, and the following year, in 1727, he came from Niš "with buffalo skins, wax and wolf skins"; in 1729 he was in Vidin, then in 1730, 1732–1733 and in 1736 in Novi Pazar, in 1740, in Prokuplje, and in 1749 again in Novi Pazar.

Simo Budmani's Novi Pazar records, in the form they have now, represent a collection of material, mostly lexicographic concerning the Italian-Serbian dictionary, with more than six hundred and fifty words and more than sixty sentences.

Valtazar Bogišić mentioned a "list of words collected in Novi Pazar by a Dubrovnik merchant Budman in the year 17.." in his book Narodne pjesme iz starijih, najčešće primorskih zapisa I ("Folk Songs from Older, Mostly Coastal Records I) which Srpsko učeno društvo (Serbian Learned Society) published in 1878.
