= Johann Sigismund Mörl =

German theologian (1710–1791)

- Born: 3 March 1710; Nuremberg
- Died: 22 February 1791 (aged 80)
- Alma mater: University of Altdorf
- Occupation: Theologian; librarian
- Employer: Melanchthon-Gymnasium Nürnberg
- Parent(s): Gustav Philipp Mörl

Johann Sigismund Mörl (3 March 1710 – 22 February 1791) was a German theologian. Son of Gustav Philipp Mörl, he was born in Nuremberg on 3 March 1710 and was educated in his native place until ready for the university at Altdorf, where he studied theology after 1727. In 1735 he was appointed dean of a church at Nuremberg. He preached until 1759, when he was appointed minister and inspector of the "Egidianum." In 1765 he was elected in this gymnasium to the professorship of Greek. Towards the close of 1770 he was called to the position of minister of St. Lawrence's church. In 1773 he accepted the position of first minister at St. Sebald's church, the superintendency of the consistory of Nuremberg, the office of city librarian, and also a professorship of positive divinity and moral philosophy. He died on 22 February 1791.

Besides several contributions to the Hachische Allgeneine Welthistorie and the Antideistische Bibel (Erlangen, 1768), to which he contributed a new computation of time from the exodus of the Jews to the time of Solomon, he published Scholia philologica et critica ad selecta S. Codicis loca (Norimb. 1737, 8vo; improved ed. by Wilder, ibid. 1793, 8vo): — Schediasma philologico- geographicum, in quo Jo. Harduini disquisitio de situ Paradisi terrestris examinatur (ibid. 1750, fol.): — Oratio de meritis Norimbergensium in Geographiam (ibid. 1750, 8vo).
