= Reval German Theatre =

Theatre in Tallinn, Estonia

- Tallinna saksa teater
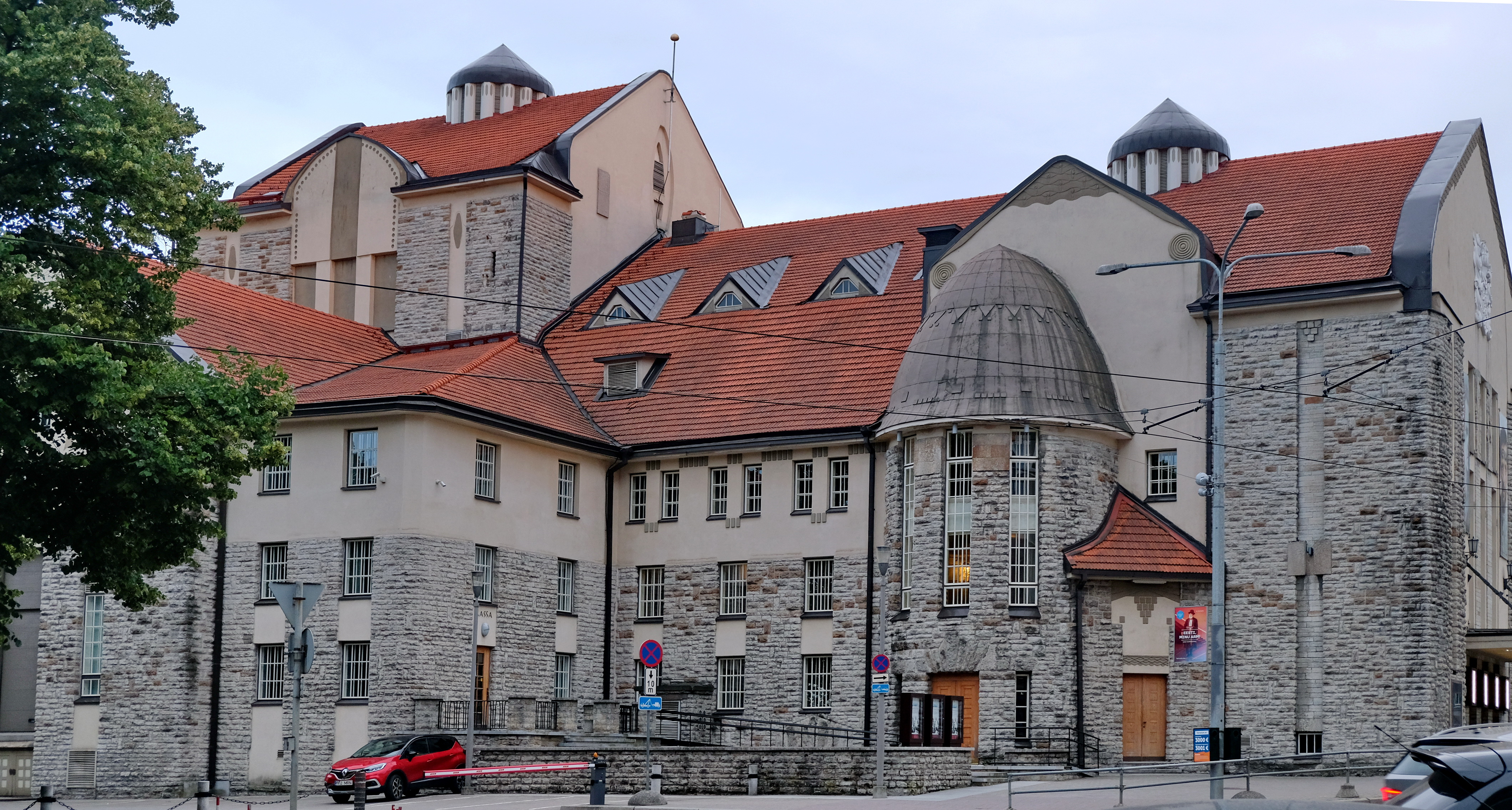
- The theatre building is a notable example of the National Romantic style.
- Interactive map of Reval German Theatre
- Address: Pärnu mnt 5, 10143 Tallinn, Estonia
- Location: Tallinn, Estonia
- Coordinates: 59°26′05″N 24°44′54″E

Construction
- Opened: 1795

The Reval German Theater (German: Revaler Deutsches Theater) is an Art Nouveau theater building in Tallinn, Estonia, which opened in 1910. It was formerly known as Revaler Theater (in German) or Tallinna Teater (in Estonian) in the 19th century, and various other names during the course of its history. Since 1924 it is home to the Estonian Drama Theatre.

== History ==
The theater was the second theater building and the first professional theater company in the city of Tallinn (then called Reval), founded in 1795. The theater was built to replace the first theater in Tallinn, the Revaler Liebhaber Theater (1784–1792). It was used by the German language amateur dramatic society (founded 1784), which performed German language drama and opera under August von Kotzebue.

In 1809 it was made a professional theater with professional German language actors, which made it the first professional theater in Tallinn, and was named (German) Revaler Theater or (Estonian) Tallinna Teater from 1809 to 1860.

It was named (Estonian) Tallinna Linnateater or (German) Revaler Stadttheater in 1860–1910; and Tallinna saksa teater in 1910–1939.

In 1939, the theater was closed and moved to occupied Poland by the order of the German government under the Nazis.

== Present use ==
The Reval German Theater building is now used by the Estonian Drama Theatre.
