= Carlo Bertinazzi =

Italian actor and author

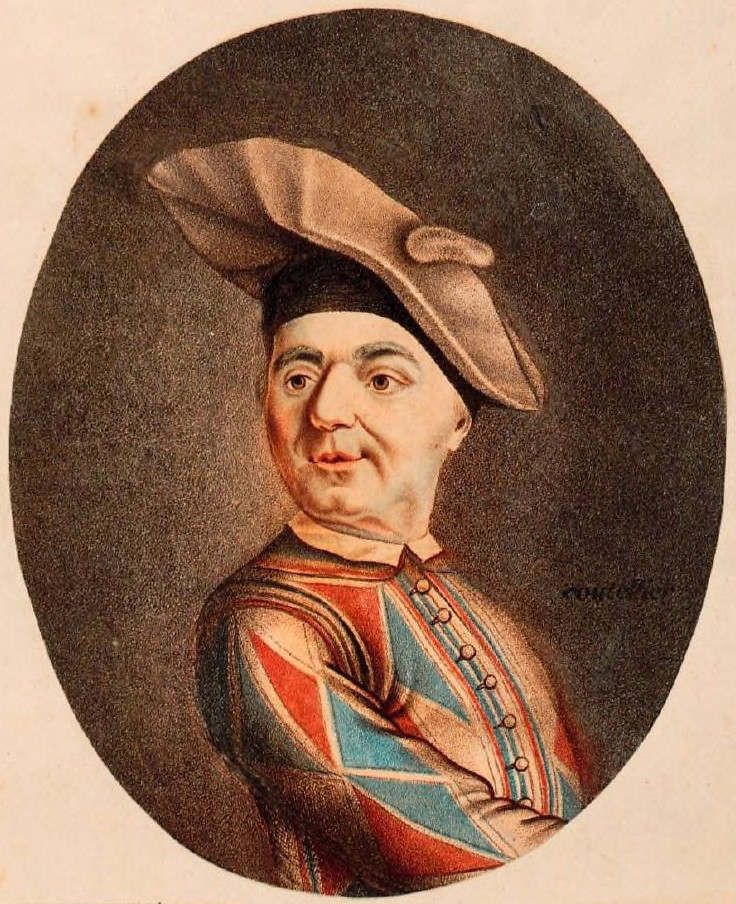
- Carlo Antonio Bertinazzi
- Born: 2 December 1710; Turin
- Died: 6 September 1783 (aged 72)
- Occupations: Actor, author

Carlo Antonio Bertinazzi (2 December 1710, in Turin – 6 September 1783), known as Carlin, was an Italian actor and author. He is known to have traveled with Giacomo Casanova's mother, Zanetta Farussi, to St Petersburg to perform for Empress Anna of Russia, only to return to Italy shortly after, as the empress did not approve of the comedy.

Carlin was best known for his role as Harlequin in the commedia dell'arte (Italian comedy) that he performed from 1741 until his death.
