= Johann Wilhelm Hoffmann =

German historian, jurist and writer

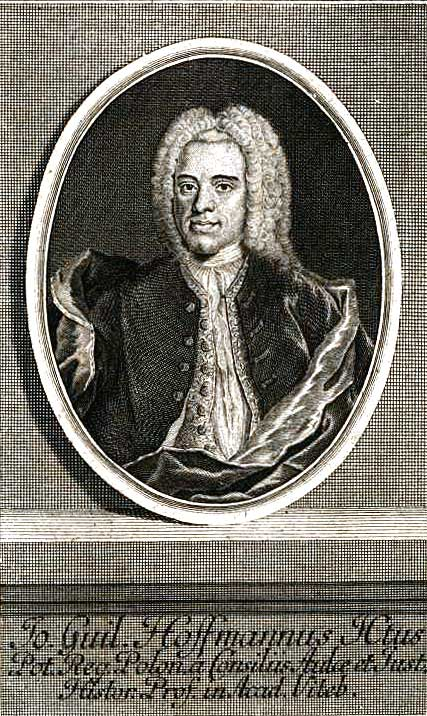
Johann Wilhelm Hoffmann

Johann Wilhelm Hoffmann (* 19 November 1710 in Zittau; † 12 November 1739 in Wittenberg) was a German historian, jurist and writer.

== Life ==
Johann Wilhelm Hoffmann was born in 1710 in Zittau, Electorate of Saxony, the son of school rector Gottfried Hoffmann. After the early death of his father in 1712, his mother (born Schoenfelder) and later his brother, Christian Gottfried Hoffmann, took over his upbringing. After he completed his education in 1728, he moved on to the University of Frankfurt (Oder) to pursue studies in law.

He quickly got to academic studies. He earned a Magister degree in 1731 and on 8 December 1731 joined the philosophical faculty. After earning a legal doctorate on November 15, 1732, he became Professor of the Faculty of Law at the University of Greifswald. According to his inclinations, he then followed a call to the University of Wittenberg in 1737 as a professor of history.

Johann arrived in Wittenberg on 7 May 1737, along with the famous library of his brother. There he lectured on Roman literature as well as church and legal history. Offers from the University of Göttingen, the University of Uppsala and the University of Frankfurt (Oder) were received and declined. By 1739 he had assumed an additional chair in Law at Wittenberg, as well as an appointment to the Royal Court and Judicial Council of Augustus the Strong. But nothing came from this title, as the constant overexertion cut Hoffmann's life short.

== Selected works ==
- Publicae laetitiae monumentum quod... Francisci Stephani regiae Celsitudini consecravit J. G. Hoffmannnus
- Diss. De juribus emigrantium propter religionem, 1732
- de observantia gentium circa praeliminaria pacis, 1736
- dissertatio de jure publico, quod in rom. Imperio interregni magni tempore obtinuit, 1736, 1740
