= Ezekiel Worthen =

Military Veteran

Major Ezekiel Worthen (March 18, 1710 - 1793) was a New Hampshire native who participated in the 1745 Siege of Louisbourg, King George's War, the French and Indian War, and the American Revolutionary War.
