= Peder Kofod Ancher =

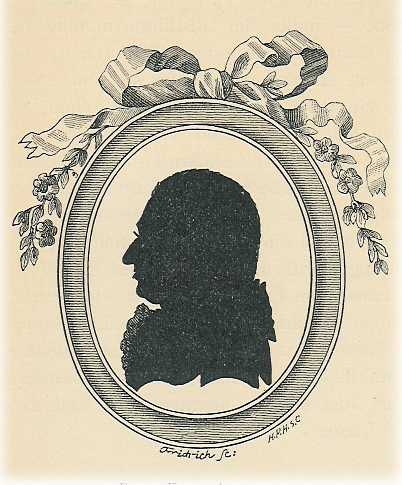
Peder Kofod Ancher

Peder Kofod Ancher (14 June 1710 – 5 July 1788) was a Danish jurist, and with Andreas Hojer and Henrik Stampe one of the most influential jurists in Denmark in the 18th century.

After studies of theology and law at the Sorø Academy, Kofod Ancher was appointed professor of law there in 1741. He defended the Danish absolutist monarchy against Enlightenment criticism, writing a polemic against Montesquieu's De l'esprit des lois in 1765. His principal work is the first history of Danish law, in which he emphasized the view that Danish law had original roots and was subject to limited influence from other traditions.

Kofod Ancher also held several government offices, including auditor-general of the navy since 1753. He was appointed in the same year a judge of the Danish Supreme Court.
