= Jean Robert Tronchin =

18th-century politician from Geneva

Jean Robert II Tronchin
- Born: 3 October 1710; Republic of Geneva
- Died: 11 March 1793 (aged 82); Rolle
- Other names: Jean Robert Tronchin-Boissier
- Occupation: politician
- Known for: member of the State Council of Geneva
- Notable work: see Works
- Spouse: Boissier
- Father: Jean Tronchin
- Relatives: Cousins: François Tronchin, Jean Robert I Tronchin, Theodore Tronchin

Jean Robert II Tronchin (3 October 1710, Geneva – 11 March 1793, Rolle), also known as Tronchin-Boissier (Boissier was his wife's name), Attorney General, member of the State Council of Geneva was the son of Jean Tronchin (1672–1761). He busied himself on a friendly basis in Voltaire's interests and maintained a correspondence on artistic subjects with Denis Diderot.

Cabinetmakers of the period gave his name to a species of pretty light reading table with a rack for drawing ("tables à la Tronchin"). He was the first cousin of François Tronchin (1704–1798) and Jean Robert I Tronchin (1702–1788), and the distant cousin of Theodore Tronchin, all three of whom were respectively Voltaire's friend, banker and doctor.

== Works ==
- 1764: Deux discours sur l'esprit de parti prononcés par M. Tronchin (...) dans l'assemblée du Conseil des Deux-Cent de la République de Genève au commencement de l'année 1762 et au commencement de l'année 1764, Neufchâtel.
- 1765: Lettres écrites de la campagne, Geneva
