= Friedrich Wilhelm Riedt =

Friedrich Wilhelm Riedt (5 January 1710 – 5 January 1783) was a German flautist, composer and music theorist of the Baroque period.

== Life ==
Riedt was born in Berlin to English-born parents. His birth date is sometimes given as 24 January 1712. His father served as a "silberdiener" at the court of Frederick William I of Prussia, a position which he took over after his father's death.

His flute teacher is unknown, however, it is known that he later studied composition with Christoph Schaffrath and Johann Gottlieb Graun. From 1741 he was a member of the Royal Hofkapelle of Frederick the Great, on a salary of 300 thalers. In 1749 he was a founding member of the "Musikübenden Gesellschaft" in Berlin and was its director until 1770.

Riedt composed almost exclusively for the flute. His works include numerous sonatas and concertos for flute, trio sonatas, and one concerto for horn. Six of his trio sonatas were published in Paris in 1754 under the name 'Rieds', and were dedicated to the Prussian Princess Anna Amalia.
