= Lukrecija Bogašinović Budmani =

Croatian writer stubs

Lukrecija Bogašinović Budmani (26 October 1710 – 8 June 1784) was a Ragusan poet.

The granddaughter of Petar Toma Bogašinović, she was born in Dubrovnik, Republic of Ragusa. Her father was a government clerk who was unjustly accused of corruption and banished from Dubrovnik. At the age of 42, she married Simone Budmani; he died ten years later. She died in Dubrovnik at the age of 73.

Although she probably produced more work, being one of the most popular poets of her time, only four works survive as manuscripts:

- Posluh Abrama patrijarke (The obedience of patriarch Abraham) (1763)
- Život Tobije (The life of Tobith) (1763)
- Razgovor pastirski vrhu porođenja Gospodinova (The shepherd's conversation on the Lord's nativity) (1764)
- Život Jozefa patrijarke (The life of patriarch Joseph) (1770)
