= Conrad II of Raabs =

Burgrave of Nuremberg (c. 1125 – c. 1191)

- Born: c. 1125-1130
- Died: c. 1191
- Noble family: House of Raabs
- Spouse: Hildegard of Abenberg
- Father: Conrad I of Raabs

Conrad II of Raabs (c. 1125-1130 – c. 1191) was from about 1160 until his death Burgrave of the medieval Burgraviate of Nuremberg.

== Life ==
Conrad was a count of Raabs, a family of edelfrei nobility, named after their first castle, Burg Raabs an der Thaya in Lower Austria. Conrad II was a son of Conrad I of Raabs, who had been enfeoffed around 1105 with the Burgraviate of Nuremberg, together with his older brother Gottfried II. Gottfried II's son Gottfried III of Raabs was expressly referred to with the title burggravius de Norinberg in 1154. Around 1160, Conrad II succeeded Gottfried III as Burgrave.

Conrad II did not have a male heir, and when he died around 1191, the male line of the Counts of Raabs died out. The Burgraviate of Nuremberg was inherited by is son-in-law, Frederick I of Zollern, who had married Conrad II's daughter, Sophia of Raabs. Emperor Henry VI probably enfeoffed Frederick I as Burgrave of Nuremberg.

Conrad II of Raabs House of Raabs Born: c. 1125-1130 Died: c. 1191
Preceded by Gottfried III	Burgrave of Nuremberg; 1160-1191	Succeeded by Frederick I (de jure uxoris)
