= Gottfried III of Raabs =

Burgrave of Nuremberg

- Died: c. 1160
- Noble family: von Raabs
- Father: Gottfried II of Raabs

Gottfried III of Raabs (died c. 1160) was Burgrave of the medieval Burgraviate of Nuremberg from around 1146 until his death.

== Life ==
Gottfried III was a member of the von Raabs family, an edelfrei family named after their first castle, Burg Raabs an der Thaya in Lower Austria. His father, Gottfried II, and his uncle, Conrad I were de facto joint Burgraves of Nuremberg from 1105, however, they used the title of Castellan. Gottfried III was the first member of the family to be specifically referred to as "Burgrave"; in a document written in 1154, he is called burggravius de Norinberg.

Gottfried III died around 1160 and was succeeded by his cousin Conrad II of Raabs. When Conrad II died around 1192, the von Raabs family died out in the male line, and the Burgraviate of Nuremberg fell to the Hohenzollern dynasty.

Gottfried III of Raabs von Raabs Died: c. 1160
Preceded by Conrad I of Raabs	Burgrave of Nuremberg; 1146-1160	Succeeded by Conrad II of Raabs
