= Frederick I =

Frederick I or Friedrich I may refer to:

- Frederick of Utrecht or Frederick I (815/16–834/38), Bishop of Utrecht.
- Frederick I, Duke of Upper Lorraine (942–978)
- Frederick I, Duke of Swabia (1050–1105)
- Frederick I, Count of Zollern (died 1125)
- Frederick I (archbishop of Cologne) (1075–1171)
- Frederick I, Holy Roman Emperor (1122–1190), "Frederick Barbarossa"
- Frederick I, Burgrave of Nuremberg (1139–1200)
- Frederick I, Duke of Lorraine (1143–1206)
- Frederick I, Count of Berg-Altena (1173–1198)
- Frederick I, Duke of Austria (Babenberg) (1175–1198), "Frederick the Catholic"
- Frederick I, Margrave of Baden (1249–1268)
- Frederick I, Margrave of Meissen (1257–1323), "the Brave"
- Frederick I of Austria (Habsburg) (1286–1330), "Frederick the Fair"
- Frederick I, Marquess of Saluzzo (1287–1336)
- Frederick I, Count of Celje (1300-59)
- Frederick I, Duke of Athens (died 1355)
- Frederick I, Elector of Saxony (1370–1428), "the Belligerent" or "the Warlike"
- Frederick I, Elector of Brandenburg (1371–1440), also Burgrave of Nuremberg (as Frederick VI)
- Frederick I, Count of Vaudémont (1371–1415)
- Frederick I, Duke of Brunswick-Lüneburg (died 1400)
- Frederick I, Count Palatine of Simmern (1417–1480), "the Hunsrücker"
- Frederick I, Duke of Brunswick-Osterode (died 1421)
- Frederick I, Elector Palatine (1425–1476), "the Victorious"
- Frederick I of Mantua (1441–1484), Marquess of Mantua
- Frederick I of Naples (1452–1504), King of Naples
- Frederick I, Margrave of Brandenburg-Ansbach (1460–1536)
- Frederick I of Denmark (1471–1533), King of Denmark and Norway
- Frederick I, Duke of Württemberg (1557–1608)
- Frederick I, Landgrave of Hesse-Homburg (1585–1638)
- Frederick I, Duke of Saxe-Gotha-Altenburg (1646–1691)
- Frederick I of Prussia (1657–1713), King in Prussia
- Frederick I of Sweden (1676–1751), King of Sweden
- Frederick I of Württemberg (1754–1816), King of Württemberg
- Frederick I, Duke of Saxe-Altenburg (1763–1834)
- Frederick I, Grand Duke of Baden (1826–1907)
- Frederick I, Duke of Anhalt (1831–1904)

== See also ==
- Frederik I (disambiguation)
- Frederick William I (disambiguation)
- Frederick Augustus I, Elector of Saxony (1670–1733), better known as King August II of Poland
- Frederick Augustus I of Saxony (1750–1827), king of Saxony 1806–1827
- Frederick Augustus I, Duke of Oldenburg (1711–1785)
- Frederick Christian I, Duke of Schleswig-Holstein-Sonderburg-Augustenburg (1721–1794)
- Frederick Francis I, Grand Duke of Mecklenburg-Schwerin (1756–1837)
- Frederick Magnus I, Count of Solms-Laubach (1521–1561)
