= Conrad I of Raabs =

Burgrave of Nuremberg (died 1143)

- Died: 1143
- Noble family: von Raabs
- Father: Gottfried I of Gosham

Conrad I of Raabs (died 1143) was Burgrave of Nuremberg from c. 1105 to c. 1137 jointly with his older brother Gottfried II. After Gottfried II died, Conrad ruled alone until his own death.

== Life ==
Conrad I was a member of the edelfrei von Raabs family. He was a son of Gottfried I of Gosham and a grandson of Ulrich of Gosham, the family's ancestor, who ruled an area northwest of Melk when the House of Babenberg ruled the Margraviate of Austria. The family takes its name from their ancestral castle in Raabs an der Thaya, which is now in Lower Austria.

In 1105, Nuremberg Castle and the city became entangled in a dispute between Emperor Henry IV and his son Henry V. The city and castle were partially destroyed. In order to better protect the castle and city in the future, the emperor appointed Conrad I and his brother Gottfried II as Burgmann and made them responsible for the protection of the castle, making them de facto burgraves. However, their official job title was Castellan; the title Burggravius de Norimberg was first used by Gottfried III of Raabs.

In the following years, Conrad I acted primarily to extend his territorial base to the west of Nuremberg. This brought him into conflict with the Bishopric of Bamberg; a document in Bamberg even calls him Conrad tyrannus. He appears to have lived in the area west of Nuremberg during this period, and occasionally called himself "Conrad of Riedfeld", after his castle near Neustadt an der Aisch.

After his brother's death, Conrad became the sole lord of Nuremberg Castle. After his death, he was succeeded by his nephew, Gottfried II's son, Gottfried III.

Conrad I of Raabs von Raabs Died: 1143
Preceded by Gottfried II of Raabs	Burgrave of Nuremberg; 1105-1143	Succeeded by Gottfried III of Raabs
