= Gottfried II of Raabs =

Burgrave of Nuremberg

- Died: c. 1137
- Noble family: von Raabs
- Father: Gottfried I of Gosham

Gottfried II of Raabs (died c. 1137) was Burgrave of the medieval Burgraviate of Nuremberg, jointly with his brother Conrad I, from 1105 until his death.

== Life ==
Gottfried II was a member of the edelfrei von Raabs family. He was the son of Gottfried I of Gosham and the grandson of Ulrich of Gosham, the ancestor of the von Raabs dynasty, who ruled an area northwest of Melk in the area when the House of Babenberg ruled the Margraviate of Austria. The von Raabs family was named after their first castle, Burg Raabs an der Thaya, in Lower Austria.

In 1105 Nuremberg Castle and the city of Nuremberg were partially destroyed during the conflict between Emperor Henry IV and his son Henry V. In order to better protect the castle and the city in the future, Henry IV appointed the brothers Gottfried II and Conrad I of Raabs as burgmann of Nuremberg castle, with the title official of "Castellan". Thus, they became the first de facto Burgraves of Nuremberg. Gottfried's son Gottfried III was the first member of the family to be called burggravius of Norimburg in an official document.

After Gottfried II died, around 1137, Conrad I ruled Nuremberg alone. After Conrad's death, Gottfried's son Gottfried III inherited the Burgraviate.

Gottfried II of Raabs von Raabs Died: c. 1137
New title	Burgrave of Nuremberg; 1105-1137; With: Conrad I	Succeeded by Conrad I
