= Elisabeth of Meissen =

- Burgravine of Nuremberg
- Born: 22 November 1329; Wartburg
- Died: 21 April 1375 (aged 45)
- Spouse: Frederick V, Burgrave of Nuremberg
- Issue: Elisabeth, Queen of the Romans; Beatrix, Duchess of Austria; Anna; Agnes; John III of Nuremberg; Frederick I, Elector of Brandenburg; Margaret, Landgravine of Hesse; Katharina
- House: Wettin
- Father: Frederick II, Margrave of Meissen
- Mother: Mathilde of Bavaria

Elisabeth of Meissen, Burgravine of Nuremberg (22 November 1329 – 21 April 1375) was the daughter of Frederick II, Margrave of Meissen and Mathilde of Bavaria and a member of the House of Wettin.

== Marriage and children ==
Elisabeth was born in Wartburg. On 7 September 1356, at the age of twenty six, she married Frederick V, Burgrave of Nuremberg in Jena. In 1357 her husband succeeded to the title, and from that time until her death in 1375, she was styled as Burgravine of Nuremberg. Together Frederick and Elisabeth had nine children, seven girls and two boys, who survived to adulthood:

1. Elisabeth (1358–26 July 1411, Heidelberg), married in Amberg 1374 to Rupert of Germany.
2. Beatrix (c. 1362, Nuremberg–10 June 1414, Perchtoldsdorf), married in Vienna 1375 Duke Albert III of Austria
3. Anna (c. 1364–after 10 May 1392), a nun in Seusslitz.
4. Agnes (1366 – 22 May 1432), Convent in Hof (1376–1386) married in Konstance 1386 Baron Friedrich of Daber, Returned to Convent in Hof (1406) Abbess in Hof (1411–1432).
5. John (c. 1369–11 June 1420, Plassenburg).
6. Frederick (1371–1440) was the last Burgrave of Nuremberg from 1397 to 1427 (as Frederick VI), Margrave of Brandenburg-Ansbach from 1398, Margrave of Brandenburg-Kulmbach from 1420, and Elector of Brandenburg (as Frederick I) from 1415 until his death. He became the first member of the House of Hohenzollern to rule the Margraviate of Brandenburg.
7. Margarete (died 1406, Gudensberg), married in Kulmbach 1383 Landgrave Hermann of Hesse.
8. Katharina (died 1409), Abbess in Hof.
9. Veronica of Hohenzollern, married Barnim VI, Duke of Pomerania.

Elisabeth died at the age of 45.
