= Frederick IV =

Frederick IV may refer to:

- Frederick IV of Swabia (1145–1167)
- Frederick IV of Zollern (c. 1188–c. 1255), Burgrave Friedrich II of Nuremberg
- Frederick IV of Lorraine (1282–1329)
- Frederick IV of Nuremberg (1287–1332)
- Frederick IV of Sicily (1341–1377), called "Frederick the Simple"
- Frederick IV of Austria (1382–1439)
- Frederick IV of Oettingen (died 1415)
- Frederick IV of Thuringia (died 1440)
- Frederick IV of Naples (1452–1504)
- Frederick IV of Brandenburg (1530–1552)
- Frederick IV, Elector Palatine (1574–1610), called "Frederick the Righteous"
- Frederick IV of Brunswick-Lüneburg (1574–1648)
- Frederick IV of Holstein-Gottorp (1671–1702)
- Frederick IV of Denmark (1671–1730)
- Frederick IV of Hesse-Homburg (1724–1751)
- Frederick IV of Saxe-Gotha-Altenburg (1774–1825)
- Frederick IV of Salm-Kyrburg (1789–1859), prince of Salm-Kyrburg, Ahaus and Bocholt

== See also ==
- Frederick Francis IV, Grand Duke of Mecklenburg-Schwerin (1882–1945)
- Frederick William IV, King of Prussia (1795–1861)
