= Frederick V of Nuremberg =

Burgrave of Nuremberg (c. 1333 –1398)

Frederick V, Burgrave of Nuremberg
- Born: 3 March 1333
- Died: 21 January 1398 (aged 64)
- Noble family: Hohenzollern
- Spouse: Elisabeth of Meissen
- Issue: Elisabeth, Queen of the Romans; Beatrix, Duchess of Austria; Anna; Agnes; John III of Nuremberg; Frederick I, Elector of Brandenburg; Margaret, Landgravine of Hesse; Katharina
- Father: John II, Burgrave of Nuremberg
- Mother: Elisabeth of Henneberg

Frederick V of Nuremberg (before 3 March 1333 – 21 January 1398) was a Burgrave (Burggraf) of Nuremberg, of the House of Hohenzollern.

== Life ==
He was the elder son of John II, Burgrave of Nuremberg and Elisabeth of Henneberg. From the death of his father in 1357, Frederick bore the title of Burgrave and so was responsible for the protection of the strategically significant imperial castle of Nuremberg. His zeal in the imperial cause led Charles IV to elevate him in 1363 to be the first Burgrave of royal rank.

After his death, his sons divided their inheritance. The eldest son, John III became the first Margrave of Brandenburg-Kulmbach. Johann's brother Frederick VI became the next Burgrave of Nuremberg as well as the first Margrave of Brandenburg-Ansbach. Frederick VI went on to become the first Hohenzollern Elector of Brandenburg.

== Family and children ==
He married in 1356 Elisabeth of Meissen, daughter of Frederick II, Margrave of Meissen, and Matilda of Bavaria. They had eight children:

1. Elisabeth (1358–26 July 1409, Heidelberg), married in Amberg 1374 to Rupert of Germany.
2. Beatrix (c. 1362, Nuremberg–10 June 1414, Perchtoldsdorf), married in Vienna 1375 Duke Albert III of Austria.
3. Margaret (died 1406, Gudensberg), married in Kulmbach 1383 Landgrave Hermann II of Hesse.
4. Anna (c. 1364–after 10 May 1392), a nun in Seusslitz.
5. Katharina (died 1409), Abbess in Hof.
6. Agnes (1366 – 22 May 1432), Convent in Hof (1376–1386) married in Constance 1386 Baron Friedrich of Daber, Returned to Convent in Hof (1406) Abbess in Hof (1411–1432).
7. John III (c. 1369–11 June 1420, Plassenburg).
8. Frederick VI (1371–1440).

Veronika, wife of Barnim VI of Pomerania, is sometimes considered another daughter of Frederick V. However, the wife of Barnim VI is disputed and there is no evidence of a further daughter of Frederick V at all.

Frederick V of Nuremberg House of Hohenzollern Died: 2 January 1398
Preceded by John II	Burgrave of Nuremberg; 1357–1397	Succeeded by division between Johann III and Frederick VI
