= Conrad I of Nuremberg =

Burgrave of Nuremberg (1186–1261)

Conrad I, Burgrave of Nuremberg
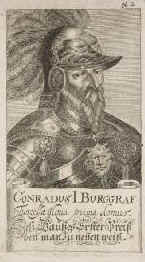
- Conrad I, Burgrave of Nuremberg
- Born: c. 1186
- Died: 1261
- Noble family: Hohenzollern
- Issue: Frederick III; Conrad II; Adelheid; Sophie
- Father: Frederick I of Nuremberg
- Mother: Sophie of Raabs

Conrad I of Nuremberg (c. 1186 – 1261) was a Burgrave of Nuremberg of the House of Hohenzollern. He was the elder son of Frederick I of Nuremberg and Sophie of Raabs.

== Life ==
Conrad was the son of Burgrave Frederick I (originally Count Frederick III of Zollern), the first Nuremberg Burgrave of the Hohenzollern, and Sophie of Raabs. As a count of Zollern he is enumerated as Conrad I. After the death of his father around 1204 the rank of burgrave passed first to Conrad's younger brother, Frederick II. However, in 1218 (or possibly 1214) the house's possessions were divided again and Conrad then received the possessions in Franconia with the title of burgrave.

In this period he strengthened his power and supported the House of Hohenstaufen in the fight between Guelphs and Ghibellines for the royal crown. Emperor Frederick II wished to develop Nuremberg to a dependable base, and therefore in 1219 bestowed a great charter of freedom upon the castle market. While Conrad took over the military protection of the town as a Burgrave, the citizens were able to attain an increasing autonomy in their internal affairs. Conrad also supported the emperor when he was banished. The death of Frederick II in 1250 was a heavy blow to the Hohenzollerns, because they now lacked their major support against the other German nobility.

Between 1237 and 1239 Conrad was an administrator of the duchy of Austria together with the Counts of Henneberg and of Andechs, although for political reasons he often opposed these families. Among other territories, he acquired the Rangau with Ansbach, significant parts of the Pegnitz valley and gained control over the most important trade routes to Nuremberg. He successfully fought against the marauding knights and warded off the nobility.

== Family and children ==
The exact name of his wife is not known. She may possibly have been Adelheid of Frontenhausen or the daughter of Frederick II, Count of Leiningen and Saarbrücken. He had the following children:

1. Frederick III of Nuremberg (c. 1220 – 14 August 1297, Cadolzburg).
2. Conrad IV of Nuremberg (d. 1314).
3. Adelheid (d. 1304), married before 8 July 1241 to Count Rapoto III of Ortenburg, Count Palatine of Bavaria.
4. Sophie (d. after 16 June 1276), married to Marquard of Arnsberg-Heydeck.

Conrad I of Nuremberg House of Hohenzollern Born: c. 1186 Died: c. 1260
Preceded by Frederick II	Burgrave of Nuremberg; 1218–1261	Succeeded by Frederick III
