= Tassilo, Count of Zollern =

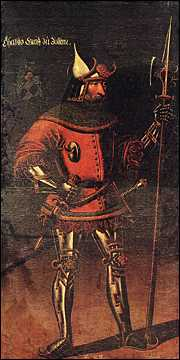
- Oil painting of Tassilo, 17th century

Count of Zollern
- Reign: ? – after 800
- Successor: Unclear
- Born: Before 800
- Died: After 800
- Spouse: Not named
- Issue: 4, including Frederick, Count of Hechingen
- House: Hohenzollern
- Father: Isembard
- Mother: Irmentrud

Tassilo, Count of Zollern, (fl. 800) is the legendary progenitor of the Hohenzollern dynasty. The existence of Tassilo was disproven in the 19th century; the family history of the Hohenzollern begins with Burkhard I, who was killed in a feud in 1061, and Wezil of Hohenzollern.

== History ==
The historian Johann Basilius Herold invented Tassilo as the dynasty's progenitors at the behest of Karl I, Count of Hohenzollern, in 1560, after having been ordered to research the dynasty's origins.

According to Herold, Tassilo was born before the year 800 as the son of Isembard and his wife Irmentrud. His mother was said to have been a daughter of Charlemagne. The count was said to have had his seat at Hohenzollern Castle. Evidence of his existence was rumoured by Herold to be found in the archives of the Muri Abbey. Tassilo was further said to have partaken in several campaigns of Charlemagne. His wife's name is not mentioned, however, four sons are, with the third son Frederick calling himself the Count of Hechingen. According to this version, the city of Hechingen and the hereditary seat of the Hohenzollern dynasty already existed in the 9th century.

The fictional ancestor is also mentioned in the works of Frederick the Great.

== See also ==
- Swabian branch of the House of Hohenzollern
