= Burg Perchtoldsdorf =

Castle in Lower Austria, Austria

Coordinates: 48°07′11″N 16°15′51″E

- Lower Austria, Austria

Site information
- Type: Castle

Burg Perchtoldsdorf is a castle in Lower Austria, Austria. Burg Perchtoldsdorf is 261 metres (856 ft) above sea level.

== Location ==
The mighty complex with a church and a castle is located on the north side of Perchtoldsdorf's market square on the slopes of the Vienna Woods. Under Joseph II in 1795/96, the market fortifications from the middle of the 13th century, which ran around the entire market, were almost completely demolished.

== History ==
=== The lords of Perchtoldsdorf ===
The origins of the castle probably date back to before the year 1000. It was built together with numerous other castles on the eastern edge of the Vienna Woods in order to protect the Babenbergs' dominion from the ever-invading Hungarians. The castle originally only consisted of a brick tower and a few wooden buildings, which were protected by a palisade and a moat. However, as it soon became too small, it was only inhabited for defensive purposes. Heinricus de Pertoldesdorf is named as the first lord of the castle in 1138. Under his successor, the wooden buildings were replaced by brick ones and an outer bailey with a wall was built. In this state, it was once again a residence. The south tower, which still stands today, was also erected as a Bergfried. The castle chapel on the second floor of the castle was elevated to a parish church in 1217 under Bishop Ulrich II of Passau. In 1232, Otto I of Perchtoldsdorf gave the castle as a freehold to Melk Abbey, from which he received it back as a fief. Otto I was involved in the aristocratic uprising against Duke Frederick II, which is why the castle was destroyed by him in the course of a punitive expedition, leaving only the base and part of the south wall. It seems that Otto then lived in his newly built Burg Kammerstein. The ruins were converted into a church. Not far from the castle, on the south-eastern corner of today's market square, a new Stadtburg was built, which mainly served administrative purposes. It was Otto II, who later fought alongside Rudolf of Habsburg at the Battle of Dürnkrut and Jedenspeigen, who had the ancestral castle rebuilt. The rebuilding of this castle was probably completed around 1270.

Otto III of Perchtoldsdorf took part in another noble uprising. As a result, all three of his castles - the ancestral castle, the town castle and Kammerstein Castle - were destroyed by Duke Albrecht I of Austria, who later became King Albrecht I, around 1290. Otto presumably died in custody.

== See also ==
- List of castles in Austria
