= John I of Nuremberg =

Burgrave of Nuremberg (c. 1279–1300)

John I, Burgrave of Nuremberg
- Born: c. 1279
- Died: 1300
- Noble family: House of Hohenzollern
- Spouse: Agnes of Hesse
- Father: Frederick III, Burgrave of Nuremberg
- Mother: Helen of Saxony

John I, Burgrave of Nuremberg (c. 1279 – 1300) was a member of the House of Hohenzollern and was Burgrave of Nuremberg from 1297 until his death. He was the son of Burgrave Frederick III of Nuremberg and his second wife, Helen of Saxony (d. 1309).

John I married in 1297 with Agnes of Hesse (d. 1335), daughter of Henry I of Hesse. He ruled the Burgraviate of Nuremberg jointly with his younger brother Frederick IV. After John I died childless in 1300, Frederick IV ruled alone.

== See also ==
- House of Hohenzollern

John I of Nuremberg House of Hohenzollern Born: c. 1279 Died: 1300
Preceded by Frederick III	Burgrave of Nuremberg; 1297–1300	Succeeded by Frederick IV
