= Margaret of Hohenzollern-Nuremberg =

- Born: 1367
- Died: 1406 (aged 38–39); Gudensberg
- Noble family: House of Hohenzollern
- Spouse: Hermann II, Landgrave of Hesse
- Issue: Anna; Heinrich; Elisabeth; Margarete; Agnes; Hermann; Frederick; Louis
- Father: Frederick V, Burgrave of Nuremberg
- Mother: Elisabeth of Meissen

Margaret of Hohenzollern-Nuremberg (1367-1406) was the daughter of Burgrave Frederick V of Nuremberg and Elisabeth of Meissen.

== Marriage and issue ==
In 1383 in Kulmbach, she married Landgrave Herman II of Hesse, as his second wife. They had eight children:

- Anna (1385–1386)
- Henry (1387–1394)
- Elisabeth (1388–1394)
- Margarete (1389–1446), married to Henry I of Brunswick-Lüneburg
- Agnes (1391–1471), married to Otto II of Brunswick-Göttingen
- Hermann (1396–1406)
- Frederick (1398–1402)
- Louis (1402–1458), succeeded as Landgrave of Hesse
