= Johann Siegmund Popowitsch =

Styrian botanist and philologist (1705–1774)

Johann Siegmund Valentin Popowitsch
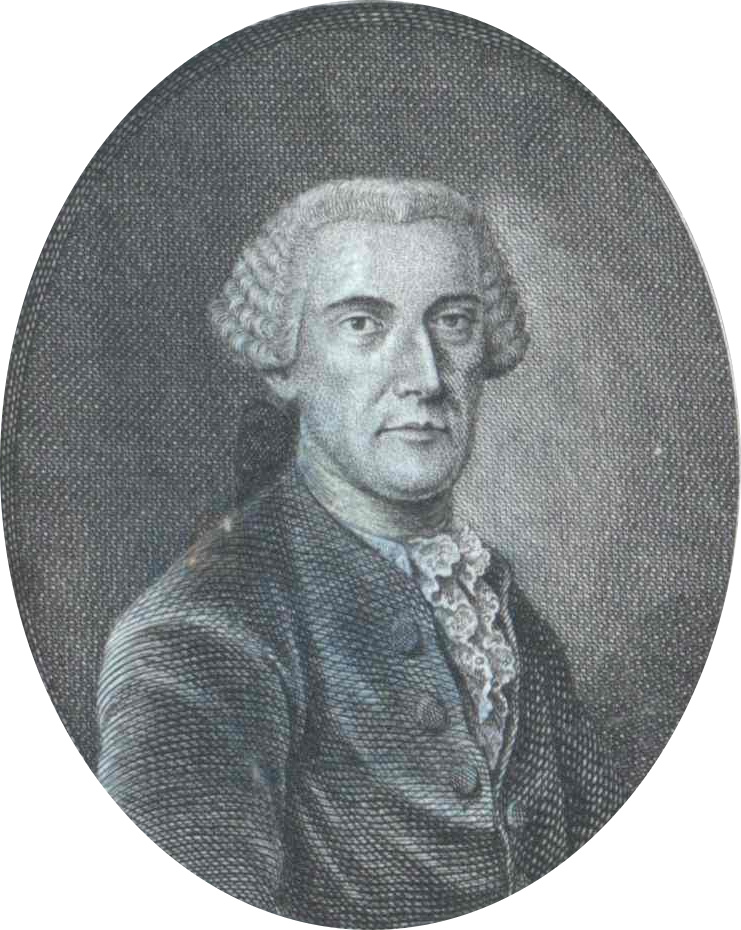
- Born: February 9, 1705; Arclin
- Died: November 21, 1774 (aged 69); Perchtoldsdorf
- Other name: Janez Žiga Valentin Popovič
- Occupation: Philologist

Johann Siegmund Valentin Popowitsch (Slovenized: Janez Žiga Valentin Popovič; February 9, 1705 – November 21, 1774) was a philologist and natural scientist from the Archduchy of Austria. His advocacy of a standardized Upper German led to Austrian German as a variety of Standard German.

Popowitsch was born in Arclin, a village near Celje in Lower Styria. He studied in Graz from 1715 to 1728, graduating from the Jesuit high school and lyceum. He continued his education by studying theology, but was not ordained. Popowitsch was familiar with 15 languages and his research interests included philology, botany, pomology, entomology, geophysics, oceanography, archaeology, history, and numismatics.

Upon being allowed to join the Göttingen German Society, Popowitsch became the subject of a critical poem by Christoph Otto von Schönaich, published in 1755.

== Dialectology and early linguistics ==
Popowitsch traveled extensively in German and Italian lands, gaining first-hand experience on dialect continua and language mixing. He was appointed the professor of German at the University of Vienna from 1753 to 1766, being preferred over Johann Christoph Gottsched by Maria Theresia and her advisors. He died in Perchtoldsdorf, at which point Vienna's Gottschedians ensured to minimize Popowitsch's linguistic legacy. He was characterized by Jernej Kopitar as the "greatest scholar of his time in Austria, a praiseworthy philologist and natural scientist."

== Works ==
- Erstes Probestück vermischter Untersuchungen, Regensburg 1749.
- Untersuchungen vom Meere, die auf Veranlassung einer Schrift, De Columnis Herculis, welche der hochberühmte Professor in Altdorf, Herr Christ. Gottl. Schwarz herausgegeben, nebst andern zu den selben gehörigen Anmerkungen von einem Liebhaber der Naturlehre und der Philologie vorgetragen werden, Frankfurt and Leipzig 1750 (anonymous).
- Die nothwendigsten Anfangsgründe der teutschen Sprachkunst, zum Gebrauche der oesterreichischen Schulen ausgefertigt, Vienna 1754.
- Programma de inveterato corrupti stili Germanici malo, Vienna 1754.
- Entwurf einer Abhandlung von Teutschen Briefen, Vienna 1760.
- Versuch einer Vereinigung der Mundarten von Teutschland: als eine Einleitung zu einem vollständigen Wörterbuche mit Bestimmungen der Wörter und beträchtlichen Beiträgen zur Naturgeschichte, Vienna 1780 (posthumous).
