= Beatrice of Nuremberg =

Duchess of Austria from 1375 to 1395

Beatrix of Nuremberg
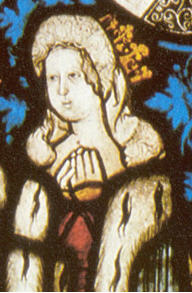
- Near-contemporary stained glass depiction
- Born: c. 1362; Nuremberg
- Died: 1414 (aged 51–52); Perchtoldsdorf
- Noble family: House of Hohenzollern
- Spouse: Albert III, Duke of Austria
- Issue: Albert IV, Duke of Austria
- Father: Frederick V, Burgrave of Nuremberg
- Mother: Elisabeth of Meissen

Beatrix of Nuremberg (c. 1362, Nuremberg – 10 June 1414, Perchtoldsdorf) was the daughter of Frederick V, Burgrave of Nuremberg, and Elisabeth of Meissen.

In 1375 in Vienna, she married Duke Albert III of Austria. They had one son: Albert IV.
