= Frederick I of Nuremberg =

Burgrave of Nuremberg (1139–1200)

Burgrave of Nuremberg
- Reign: ? – 1204
- Successor: Conrad I

Count of Zollern
- Reign: 1142 or after 1145 – 1204
- Predecessor: Frederick II
- Successor: Frederick IV
- Born: before 1139
- Died: after 1 October 1200
- Spouse: Sophia of Raabs
- Issue: Conrad I, Burgrave of Nuremberg; Friedrich IV, Count of Zollern; Elisabeth
- House: Hohenzollern
- Father: Friedrich II of Zollern

Friedrich I of Nuremberg (before 1139 – after 1 October 1200) was the first Burgrave of Nuremberg from the House of Hohenzollern. He was the younger son of Count Friedrich II of Zollern, and became Count of Zollern as Friedrich III after the death of his other male relatives.

== Life ==
From 1171 Friedrich I proved himself an adherent of the Hohenstaufen party, namely of Holy Roman Emperor Frederick I Barbarossa and his sons, Friedrich V, Duke of Swabia, Holy Roman Emperor Henry VI, and German king Philip of Swabia, and was party to the action by Barbarossa against Henry the Lion in 1180. Especially significant would prove the marriage of Friedrich, whose possessions at this time lay in the Duchy of Swabia, to Sophie of Raabs around 1184, the only daughter of Conrad II of Raabs, and heiress of the Burgraviate of Nuremberg.

When he was granted the burgraviate by Henry VI after Conrad's death around 1191, he became the founder of both the Swabian branch of the Hohenzollern family, and of the Franconian line of the (later imperial) House of Hohenzollern, which he renamed Hohenzollern at this time to distinguish it from the House of Zollern. Through his wife, as the lone heiress of the Counts of Raabs and Abenberg, Friedrich was able to add possessions in Austria and Franconia, respectively, to his line.

== Family and children ==
With Sophie of Raabs he had following children:

1. Conrad I, Burgrave of Nuremberg (died 1261). Eldest son. (Franconian branch, later Electors of Brandenburg and Kings of Prussia)
2. Friedrich IV of Zollern (died 30 December 1255). (Swabian branch)
3. Elisabeth (died 1255), married to Landgrave Gerhard III of Leuchtenberg.

Frederick I of Nuremberg House of Hohenzollern Born: circa 1139 Died: circa 1200
Preceded by Friedrich II	Count of Zollern as Friedrich III after 1145 — circa 1200	Succeeded by Friedrich IV
Preceded by Conrad II	Burgrave of Nuremberg as Friedrich I circa 1192 — circa 1200	Succeeded by Friedrich IV
