= Frederick II of Zollern =

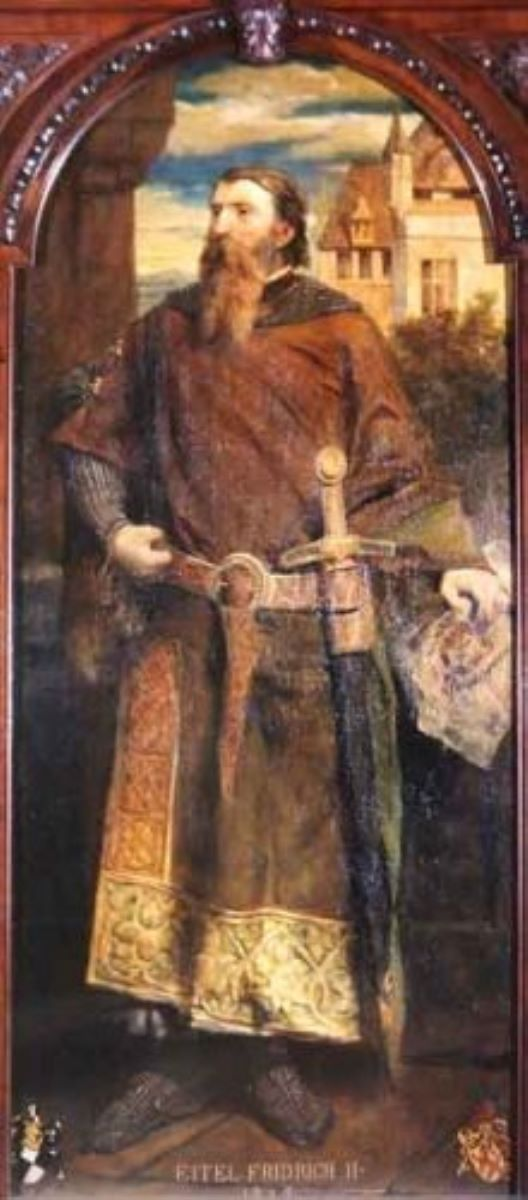
- Portrait by Franz von Matsch at Peleș Castle

Count of Zollern
- Reign: 1125 – 1142 or after 1145
- Predecessor: Frederick I
- Successor: Frederick III
- Born: Before 1125
- Died: 1142 or after 1145
- Issue: Frederick I of Nuremberg; Bertold of Zollern
- House: Hohenzollern
- Father: Frederick I, Count of Zollern
- Mother: Udilhild of Urach-Dettingen

Frederick II, Count of Zollern (died: 1142 or after 1145) was the eldest son of Frederick I, Count of Zollern, and became Count of Zollern after his father's death around 1125.

Frederick II supported Lothar of Supplinburg, who was King of Germany, then Holy Roman Emperor, from 1125 to Lothar's death in 1137 against the House of Hohenstaufen, then supported that same house (and the new German King, Conrad III of Germany) after 1138 against the House of Welf.

It was also at this time that the counts of Zollern were able to greatly increase their possessions in terms of both territory and castles in the southwestern parts of today's Germany, expanding to the Rhine, and lower Danube, as well as adding territory in Alsace and by the Neckar. All of these possessions were in the form of allodial land. Land held in feudal tenure was added to these outright possessions to form the ancestral territory of the counts of Zollern.

== Family and children ==
Frederick had at least two sons:

- Frederick III, Count of Zollern, (died: c. 1200), who became Burgrave of Nuremberg as Friedrich I
- Bertold of Zollern

== See also ==
- House of Hohenzollern

Frederick II of Zollern House of Hohenzollern Born: before 1125 Died: c. 1145
Preceded by Friedrich I	Count of Zollern	Succeeded by Friedrich III
