= Frederik I =

Frederik I may refer to:

- Frederick I of Denmark (1471–1533)
- Frederick I of Sweden (1676–1751)

== See also ==
- Frederick I (disambiguation)
