= John III of Nuremberg =

Margrave of Brandenburg-Kulmbach (c. 1369–1420)

John III of Nuremberg (c. 1369 – 11 June 1420 in Plassenburg), Margrave of Brandenburg-Kulmbach from the House of Hohenzollern. He was elder son of Frederick V of Nuremberg and Elisabeth of Meissen.

== Family and children ==
He was married c. 1381 Margaret of Luxemburg, daughter of Charles IV, Holy Roman Emperor and Elizabeth of Pomerania, with whom he had been betrothed since he was 2. They had only daughter, Elisabeth (1391–1429), who married Eberhard III, Count of Württemberg.

John III of Nuremberg House of Hohenzollern Born: 1369 Died: 11 June 1420
German nobility
Preceded by Frederick V	Burgrave of Nuremberg; 1397–1420 with Frederick VI	Succeeded by Frederick VI
New title Division of inheritance from Frederick V	Margrave of Brandenburg-Kulmbach; 1398–1420	Succeeded by Frederick VI
