= Frederick III of Nuremberg =

Burgrave of Nuremberg (c. 1220–1297)

Frederick III, Burgrave of Nuremberg
- Born: c. 1220
- Died: 14 August 1297; Cadolzburg
- Noble family: Hohenzollern
- Spouses: Elisabeth of Merania; Helene of Saxony
- Issue: John; Siegmund; Marie; Adelheid; Elisabeth; John I, Burgrave of Nuremberg; Frederick IV of Nuremberg; Anna
- Father: Conrad I of Nuremberg
- Mother: Adelheid of Frontenhausen

Frederick III of Nuremberg (c. 1220 – 14 August 1297), Burgrave of Nuremberg from the House of Hohenzollern, was the eldest son of Conrad I of Nuremberg and Adelheid of Frontenhausen.

== Life ==
He owned the possessions of Hohenzollern on the west of Nuremberg around the castle Cadolzburg. In 1248 he received from the Counts of Andechs the region of Bayreuth by so-called Meran's inheritance. However, this led to a quarrel with other noble houses who also had claims on these lands. After the death of Conrad I in 1261 he became Burgrave of Nuremberg and tried to eliminate the Frankish power in the Main region. That resulted in the violent opposition of the bishops of Würzburg and Bamberg.

In 1273 he gave his deciding vote for his friend Rudolf of Habsburg on the election of the king of the Romans. As a reward the King confirmed his position as a Burgrave and granted the rank of a Prince-Elector. Thus Frederick was entrusted with the royal district court of Franconia, took part in the imperial war against the outlawed Otakar II of Bohemia and also joined in the struggle in the Battle of Dürnkrut and Jedenspeigen in 1278. More particularly, he had a territorial quarrel with Bohemia about the Egerland. At this time, Wunsiedel, Erlangen and Arzberg came into the possession of the House of Hohenzollern.

== Family and children ==
Friedrich was married twice. After marrying Elisabeth of Merania, the daughter and heir of Otto I, Duke of Merania, they had the following children:

1. John, murdered near Nuremberg c. 1262.
2. Siegmund, murdered near Nuremberg c. 1262.
3. Marie (d. before 28 March 1299), married bef. 28 July 1263 to Count Ludwig V of Öttingen.
4. Adelheid (d. ca. 1307), married bef. 25 March 1273 to Count Henry II of Castell.
5. Elisabeth (d. 1288), married to:
  1. bef. 17 April 1280 Eberhard II of Schlüsselberg;
  2. bef. 13 March 1285 Gottfried II of Hohenlohe.

He married a second time. On 10 April 1280, Helene of Saxony, daughter of Albert I, Duke of Saxony, and Helene of Brunswick-Lüneburg, became his wife. They had the following children:

1. John I, Burgrave of Nuremberg (ca. 1279–1300).
2. Frederick IV of Nuremberg (1287–1332).
3. Anna (d. after 1355), married before 3 January 1297 to Count Emicho I of Nassau-Hadamar.

Frederick III of Nuremberg House of Hohenzollern Born: c. 1220 Died: 14 August 1297
Preceded by Konrad I	Burgrave of Nuremberg; 1261–1297	Succeeded by John I
