= Frederick IV of Nuremberg =

Burgrave of Nuremberg (1287–1332)

Frederick IV
- Burgrave of Nuremberg
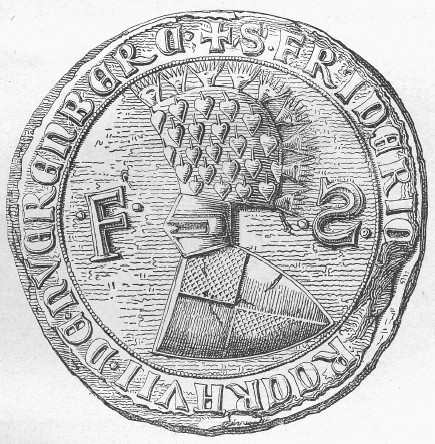
- Seal of Burgrave Frederick IV
- Born: 1287
- Died: 19 May 1332 (aged 45)
- Noble family: Hohenzollern
- Spouse: Margaret of Görz
- Issue Detail: John II, Burgrave of Nuremberg
- Father: Frederick III of Nuremberg
- Mother: Helene of Saxony

Frederick IV (c. 1287 – 19 May 1332) was Burgrave of Nuremberg from 1300, until his death in 1332. He was the younger son of Burgrave Frederick III from his second marriage with the Ascanian princess Helene of Saxony.

== Life ==
He succeeded to the burgraviate when his elder brother John I died in 1300. In 1307, he and King Albert I of Germany led an Imperial Army into the Battle of Lucka against the Wettin margraves Frederick I of Meissen and Dietrich IV of Lustia, and were defeated. Frederick IV fought more successfully alongside the Wittelsbach king Louis the Bavarian at the Battle of Mühldorf on 28 September 1322, capturing the Habsburg rival Frederick the Fair.

In 1331 he purchased the town of Ansbach, nucleus of the later Hohenzollern Principality of Ansbach established in 1398. A year later Frederick died, and was succeeded by his son, John II.

== Family and children ==
He married before 2 August 1307 Margaret of Görz-Tyrol, a granddaughter of Duke Meinhard of Carinthia. Their children were:

1. John II, Burgrave of Nuremberg (c. 1309–1357).
2. Conrad III of Nuremberg (d. 1334).
3. Frederick (d. 1365), Bishop of Regensburg in 1340–1365.
4. Albert "der Schöne" (d. 1361); his daughter Anna of Nuremberg married Swantibor III, Duke of Pomerania.
5. Berthold (1320–1365, Willibaldsburg), Bishop of Eichstädt in 1354–1365, Chancellor to Charles IV, Holy Roman Emperor.
6. Helene (d. after 1374), married to:
  1. c. 1321 Count Otto V of Orlamünde;
  2. 1341/46 Count Henry VII, Count of Schwarzburg-Blankenburg.
7. Anna (d. after 1340), married Ulrich I of Leuchtenberg.
8. Margarete (d. after 13 November 1382), married 1332 Adolph I, Count of Nassau-Wiesbaden-Idstein.
9. Agnes (d. after 1363), married to:
  1. in 1336 Berthold V of Neuffen, Count of Marstetten and Graisbach;
  2. c. 1343 Albrecht II of Werdenberg and Heiligenberg.
10. Katharina (d. after 11 March 1373), married in 1338 to Eberhard of Wertheim.

Frederick IV of Nuremberg House of Hohenzollern Born: c. 1287 Died: 19 May 1332
Preceded by John I	Burgrave of Nuremberg; 1300–1332	Succeeded by John II
