= Frederick IV of Zollern =

Burgrave of Nuremberg (c. 1188 – c. 1255)

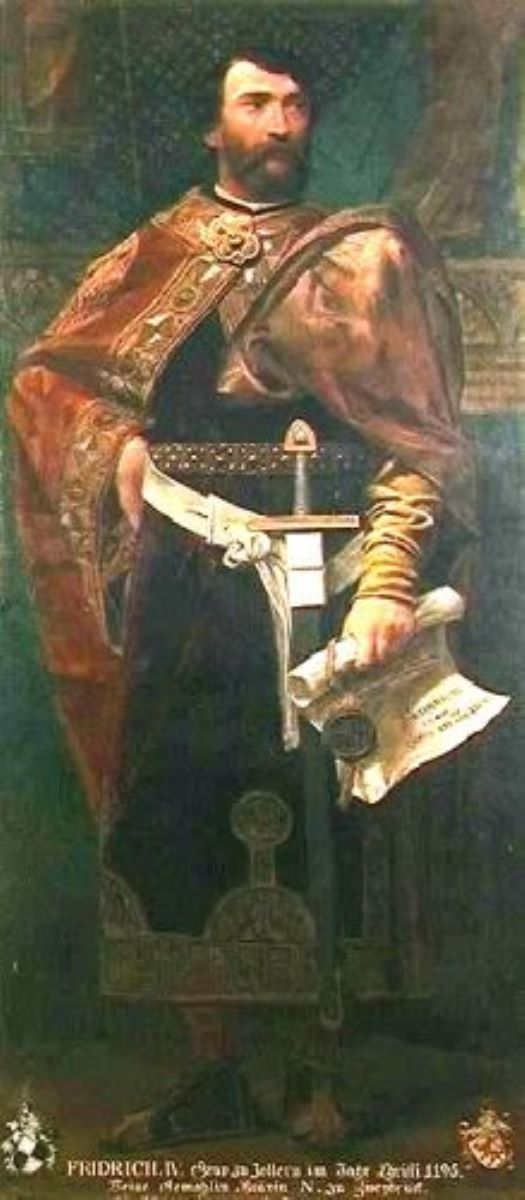
- Portrait by Franz von Matsch at Peleș Castle

Burgrave of Nuremberg
- Reign: 1204 – 1218
- Predecessor: Conrad I
- Successor: Frederick III

Count of Zollern
- Reign: 1218 – 1255
- Predecessor: Friedrich III
- Successor: Frederick V
- Born: c. 1188
- Died: c. 1255
- Issue: Frederick V, Count of Zollern
- House: Hohenzollern
- Father: Friedrich I, Burgrave of Nuremberg
- Mother: Sophia of Raabs

Count Friedrich IV of Zollern (c. 1188 – c. 1255), also known as Burgrave Friedrich II of Nuremberg, was Burgrave of Nuremberg from 1204 to 1218 and Count of Zollern from 1218 until his death.

== Life ==
Friedrich IV was the younger son of Friedrich I of Nuremberg-Zollern (c. 1139 – c. 1200) and his wife Sophia of Raabs (died c. 1218) . After his father's death, he was appointed as his successor as Burgrave of Nuremberg. In 1218, Friedrich and his older brother Conrad I divided their inheritance: Conrad received the Franconian possessions and became Burgrave of Nuremberg; Friedrich received the ancestral County of Zollern. He is considered the founder of the Swabian line of the House of Hohenzollern.

He died c. 1255 and was succeeded as Count of Zollern by his son Friedrich V (died 24 May 1289).

== See also ==
- House of Hohenzollern

Frederick IV of Zollern House of Hohenzollern Born: c. 1188 Died: c. 1255
Preceded by Friedrich III	Burgrave of Nuremberg; 1204–1218	Succeeded by Conrad I
Preceded by Friedrich III	Count of Zollern; 1218–1255	Succeeded by Friedrich V
