= Arclin =

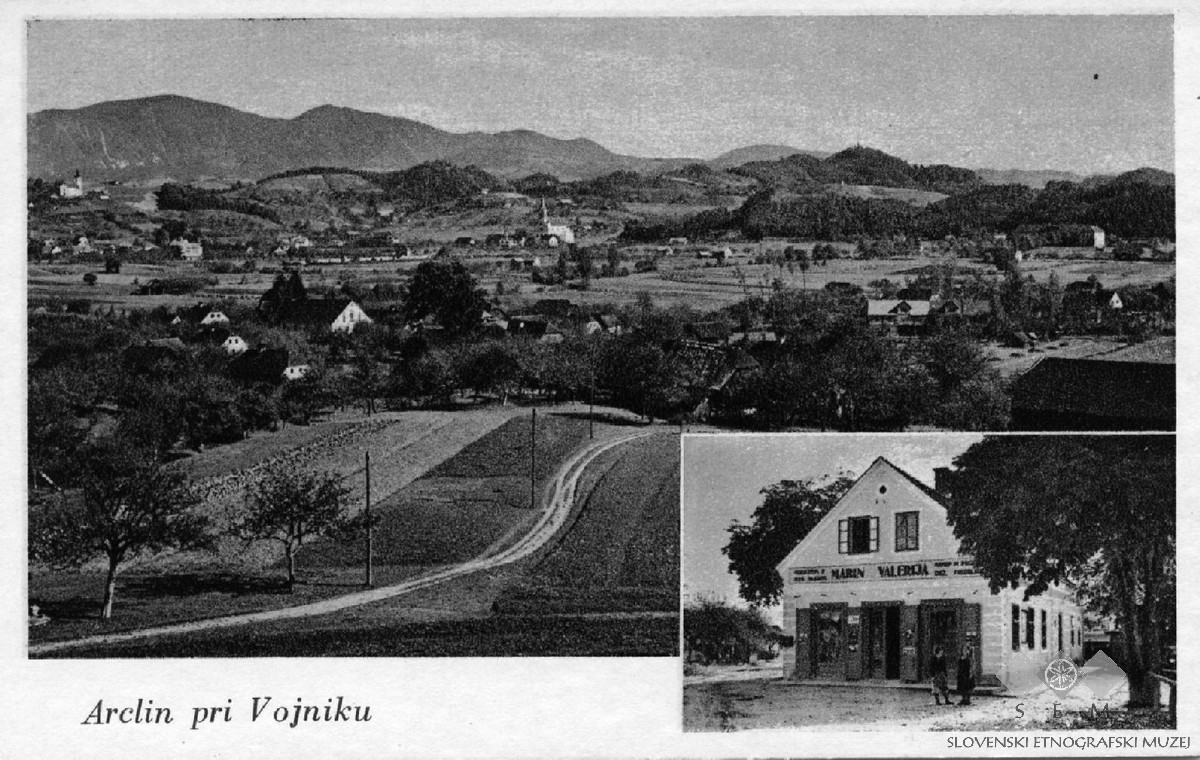
- Postcard of Arclin

- Location in Slovenia
- Coordinates: 46°16′31.99″N 15°17′58.57″E
- Country: Slovenia
- Traditional region: Styria
- Statistical region: Savinja
- Municipality: Vojnik

Area
  - Total: 1.44 km^{2} (0.56 sq mi)
- Elevation: 255.5 m (838 ft)

Population (2002)
  - Total: 494

Arclin (pronounced [aɾtsˈliːn]) is a settlement in the Municipality of Vojnik in eastern Slovenia. It lies on the main road south of Vojnik towards Celje. The area is part of the traditional region of Styria. It is now included with the rest of the municipality in the Savinja Statistical Region.

== Cultural heritage ==
A small roadside chapel-shrine in the village dates to the late 19th century.

== Notable people ==
Notable people that were born or lived in Arclin include:

- Johann Siegmund Popowitsch (Slovene: Janez Žiga Popovič, 1705–1774), natural scientist
- Maks Samec, Sr. (1844–1889), physician
- Lovro Stepišnik (1834–1912), national revivalist
