= John II of Nuremberg =

Burgrave of Nuremberg (c. 1309–1357)

John II 'the Acquirer', Burgrave of Nuremberg
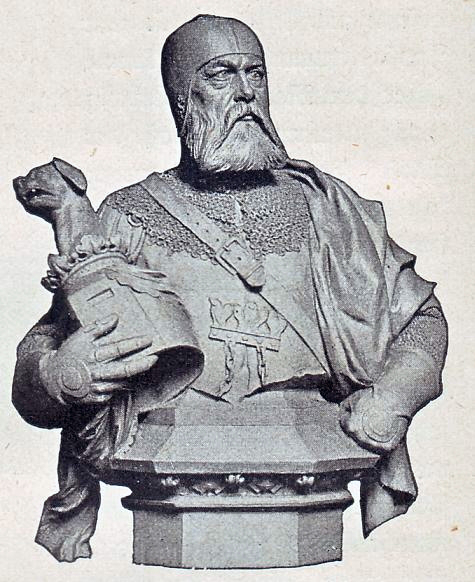
- John II, Burgrave of Nuremberg. Statue by Ernst Herter, 1899, former Siegesallee in Berlin
- Born: c. 1309
- Died: 31 July 1357 (aged 47)
- Noble family: Hohenzollern
- Spouse: Elisabeth of Henneberg
- Issue Detail: Frederick V, Burgrave of Nuremberg
- Father: Frederick IV of Nuremberg
- Mother: Margarete of Görz

John II of Nuremberg (c. 1309 – 1357) was a Burgrave of Nuremberg from the House of Hohenzollern. He was the elder son of Frederick IV of Nuremberg and Margarete of Görz.

== Life ==
He succeeded his father in 1332. He attained his name "the Acquirer" (German: der Erwerber) by the increase of the Frankish house possession of the Hohenzollern. From determining meaning the acquisition of the castle Plassenburg in Kulmbach with the county of Kulmbach by the contract of inheritance which became effective with the extinction of the present owners, the counts of Orlamünde in 1340.

== The Plague ==
In the time of his government, came the outbreak of the Black Death, which claimed numerous victims in Nuremberg. Because the Jewish population was held responsible for the epidemic, numerous Nuremberg Jews were murdered, without the burgrave intervening against it.

== Family and children ==
He married countess Elisabeth of Henneberg, daughter of Berthold VII, Count of Henneberg-Schleusingen, before 3 March 1333. Their children were:

1. Frederick V, Burgrave of Nuremberg (before 3 March 1333 – 21 January 1398).
2. Margarete (died 1377), married in 1359, Landshut, to Duke Stephen II, Duke of Bavaria.
3. Elisabeth (died ca 1383), married 1360, to Ulrich, Count of Schaunberg.
4. Anna (died 1383), Abbess of Birkenfeld and of Himmelkron.
5. Adelheid, a nun in Birkenfeld from 1361 to 1370.

John II of Nuremberg House of Hohenzollern Born: c. 1309 Died: 1357
Preceded by Frederick IV	Burgrave of Nuremberg; 1332–57	Succeeded by Frederick V
