= Frederick I of Zollern =

German noble (died before 1125)

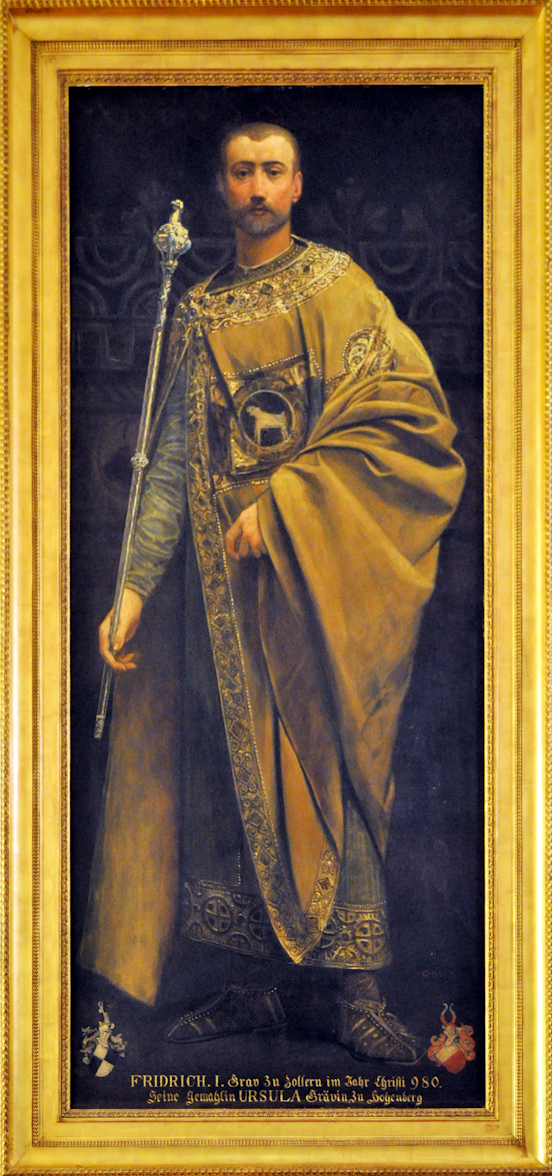
- Painting of Frederick I from Peleș Castle

Count of Zollern
- Reign: 1061 – before 1125
- Predecessor: Burkhard I
- Successor: Frederick II
- Died: Before 1125
- Spouse: Udilhild of Urach-Dettingen
- Issue: 9, including: Frederick II of Zollern
- House: Hohenzollern
- Father: Burkhard I (most likely)

Frederick I, Count of Zollern (nicknamed Maute; died before 1125), was often cited as a powerful Swabian Count and supporter of the imperial party of Henry V, Holy Roman Emperor.

He most likely was the son of Burkhard I, and was married to Udilhild (or Udahild) of the House of Urach (died: 11. April, 1134), which house later became the Fürstenberg family. They had nine children; his eldest son was Frederick II. A younger son was Burkhard, who founded the Zollern-Hohenberg line (which became extinct in 1486).

Frederick was the first reeve of the Swabian Alpirsbach Abbey, which had been founded by Adalbert of Zollern (from the short-lived Zollern-Haigerloch line) and other lords.

The Zollern (later: Hohenzollern) dynasty based their rise to power on their loyalty to the ruling royal or imperial family. Frederick I served the Holy Roman Emperor Henry V, and was sent on a diplomatic mission to France. He also accompanied Henry V on his Italian expedition in 1110 and again in 1111, where Henry V intended to claim the imperial crown in Rome. He is also mentioned as an advisor to Henry V in both 1111 and 1114, both times while the imperial party was in Strasbourg.

== Family and children ==
Frederick I and Udilhild most likely had at least nine children:

- Frederick II (died around 1143), Count of Zollern
- Burkhard (died between 1150 and 1155), also Burkhard II of Zollern-Hohenberg
- Egino
- Gotfried of Zimmern (most likely near Hechingen) (died between 1156 and 1160), likely Count of Zollern sometime around 1155
- Ulrich (died 1135 by poisoning), who late in life became a monk, then abbot, at the Benedictine abbey in Reichenau, after supposedly having been involved in the murder of his predecessor
- Adalbert (or Albert), who became a monk in Zwiefalten
- Kuno (?)
- Luitgard
- Udilhild

== See also ==
- House of Hohenzollern

Frederick I of Zollern House of Hohenzollern Died: before 1125
Preceded by Burkhard I	Count of Zollern	Succeeded by Frederick II
