= Frederick I of Brandenburg =

Elector of Bradenburg from 1415 to 1440

Frederick I
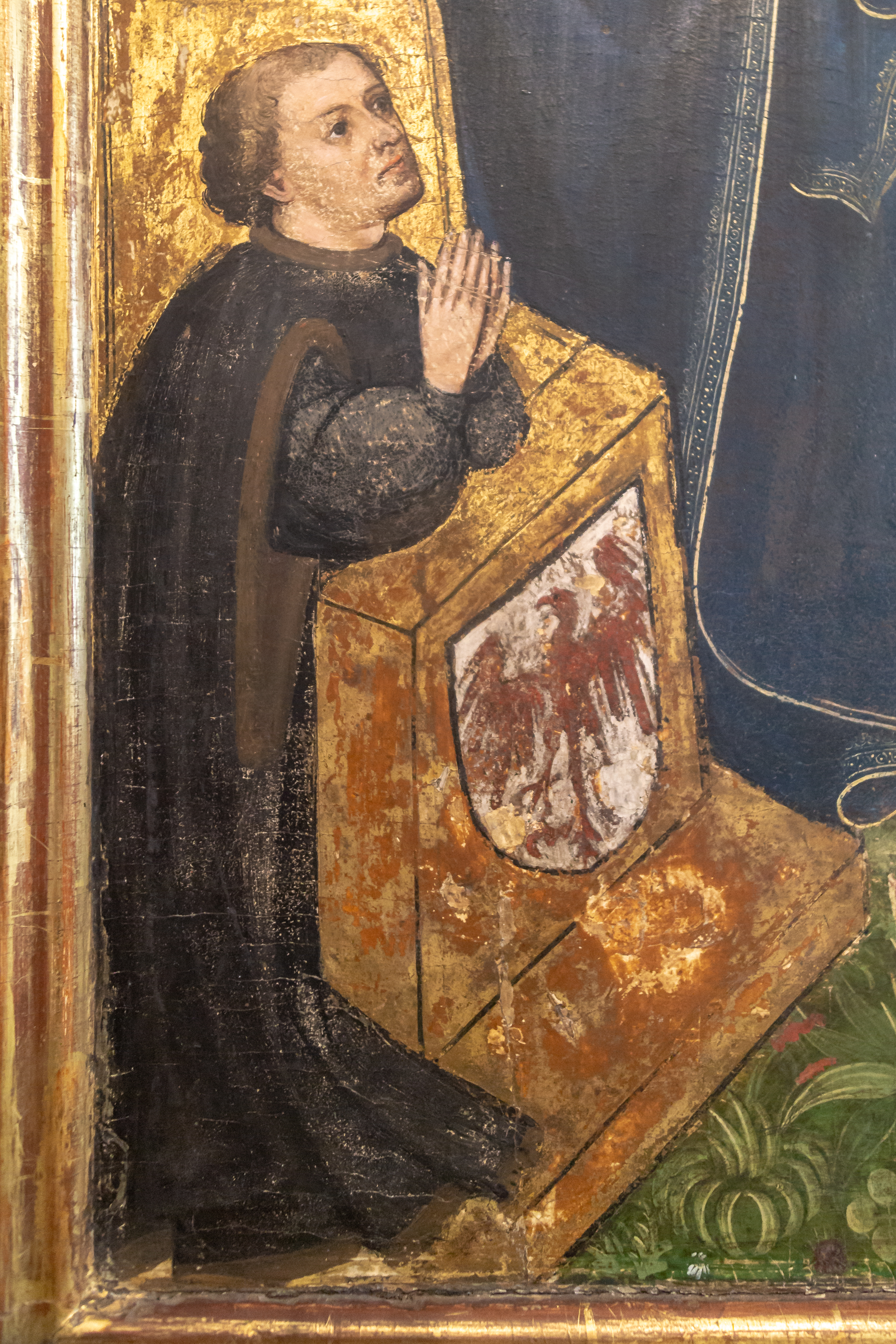
- Frederick I as depicted on the Cadolzburger Altar (by the Meister des Cadolzburger Altars, c. 1425-1430)

Elector of Brandenburg
- Reign: 30 April 1415 – 20 September 1440
- Predecessor: Sigismund of Luxembourg
- Successor: Frederick II
- Born: 21 September 1371; Free Imperial City of Nuremberg
- Died: 20 September 1440 (aged 68); Cadolzburg Castle, Principality of Ansbach
- Spouse: Elisabeth of Bavaria-Landshut (m. 1401)
- Issue: Elisabeth, Duchess of Brzeg-Legnica and Cieszyn; John, Margrave of Brandenburg-Kulmbach; Cecilia, Duchess of Brunswick-Wolfenbüttel; Margaret, Duchess of Mecklenburg; Magdalene, Duchess of Brunswick-Lüneburg; Frederick II, Elector of Brandenburg; Albert III Achilles, Elector of Brandenburg; Dorothea, Duchess of Mecklenburg; Frederick, Margrave of Brandenburg
- House: Hohenzollern
- Father: Frederick V, Burgrave of Nuremberg
- Mother: Elisabeth of Meissen

Frederick (Middle High German: Friderich, Standard German: Friedrich; 21 September 1371 – 20 September 1440) was the last Burgrave of Nuremberg from 1397 to 1427 (as Frederick VI), Margrave of Brandenburg-Ansbach from 1398, Margrave of Brandenburg-Kulmbach from 1420, and Elector of Brandenburg (as Frederick I) from 1415 until his death. He became the first member of the House of Hohenzollern to rule the Margraviate of Brandenburg.

== Biography ==
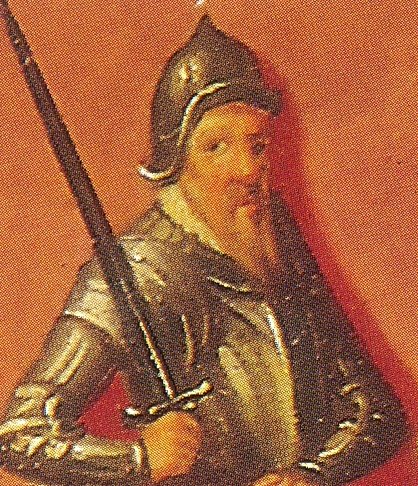
Burgrave Frederick, 15th century portrait

Frederick was born in Nuremberg, the second-born son of Burgrave Frederick V (1333–1398) of the House of Hohenzollern and the Wettin princess Elisabeth of Meissen. He entered early into the service of his brother-in-law, the Habsburg duke Albert III of Austria. After Albert's death in 1395, he fought on the side of the Luxembourg king Sigismund of Hungary against invading Ottoman forces. He and his elder brother John, husband of Sigismund's sister Margaret of Bohemia, fought in the 1396 Battle of Nicopolis where they suffered a disastrous defeat.

After Frederick returned to Nuremberg, he divided the Franconian inheritance from his father with his brother John, who received the Principality of Bayreuth, while Frederick kept the Principality of Ansbach; the brothers ruled jointly in the Burgraviate of Nuremberg. At first Frederick tried to mediate in the imperial confusion between Sigismund's elder half-brother, the German king Wenceslaus, and the party of Elector Rupert III of the Palatinate, but from September 1399 he fought on the side of Rupert, husband of his sister Elizabeth, nonetheless. Wenceslaus was eventually deposed and Rupert elected King of the Romans on 21 August 1400.

Frederick resumed his rule of Ansbach in 1409 and after heavy feuding, entered into the service of King Sigismund. In 1410, the death of Rupert, King of the Germans, left the throne of the Holy Roman Empire vacant. Sigismund enlisted Frederick's help in obtaining the throne. At the time, Jobst of Moravia ruled Brandenburg and thus was one of the prince-electors who had the right to vote for the new king. However, Sigismund disputed Jobst's claim to Brandenburg and his right to vote in the imperial election. Sigismund claimed these rights for himself and designated Frederick to represent him as elector of Brandenburg in the imperial election of 20 September 1410. While Sigismund won this initial vote, Jobst of Moravia won the support of a majority of electors in an election in October 1410 and himself claimed the imperial throne. Jobst's death under suspicious circumstances in January 1411 cleared the way for Sigismund's recovery of Brandenburg and his undisputed election as king of the empire later that year. In gratitude for Frederick's services, King Sigismund made him Oberster Hauptmann and Verwalter der Marken (1411). With an iron hand Frederick fought against the rebellious nobility of the March of Brandenburg (in particular, the Von Quitzow family) and, in the end, restored security. Frederick also became a member of the Parakeet Society and of the League of Constance.

At the Council of Constance (30 April 1415), Sigismund granted Frederick the titles of Margrave and Prince-elector of Brandenburg. On 21 October 1415 the Brandenburg states meeting in a Landtag asked him to rule in Berlin. The king awarded him the formal enfeoffment of the margraviate on 18 April 1417. As Frederick did not agree with the forcible action of Sigismund against the Hussites, relations between them cooled.

Constant feuding with the nobility of Brandenburg led Frederick to withdraw to his castle at Cadolzburg in 1425 and transfer the regency of the mark to his son John in 1426 (Frederick, however, remained elector). After 1427 he organized the imperial war against the Hussites. He is best known for joining the papal legate, Cardinal Julian Cesarini in August 1431 to attack the Hussites in the disastrous Battle of Domažlice. He subsequently provided substantial assistance in the mediation of the Compacta of Prague at the Council of Basel (30 November 1433).

Upon his death in 1440, Frederick was succeeded as elector by his second-eldest son, Frederick II.

== Family and children ==
He married Elisabeth of Bavaria-Landshut (1383–13 November 1442, Ansbach), daughter of Duke Frederick of Bavaria-Landshut and Maddalena Visconti in 1401. Their children were:

1. Elisabeth (1403–31 October 1449, Liegnitz), married:
  1. in Konstanz 1418 Duke Louis II of Brieg and Legnica (1380/5–1436);
  2. in 1438 Duke Wenzel I of Teschen (1413/18–1474).
2. John "the Alchemist" (1405–1465), Margrave of Brandenburg-Kulmbach.
  1. married in 1416 Princess Barbara of Saxe-Wittenberg (1405–1465)
3. Cecilia (c. 1405–4 January 1449), married:
  1. in Berlin 30 May 1423 Duke William III of Brunswick-Lüneburg (1392–1482).
4. Margaret (1410–27 July 1465, Landshut), married:
  1. in 1423 to Duke Albert V, Duke of Mecklenburg (1397–1423);
  2. in Ingolstadt 20 July 1441 to Louis VIII, Duke of Bavaria (1403–1445);
  3. in 1446 to Count Martin of Waldenfels (d. 1471).
5. Magdalene (c. 1412 –27 October 1454, Scharnebeck), married:
  1. in Tangermünde 3 July 1429 to Duke Frederick of Brunswick-Lüneburg (1418–1478).
6. Frederick II (1413–1471), Elector of Brandenburg
  1. married in 1441 Princess Catherine of Saxony (1421–1476)
7. Albert Achilles, (1414–1486), Elector of Brandenburg, married:
  1. in 1446 Princess Margarete of Baden (1431–1457)
  2. in 1458 Princess Anna of Saxony (1437–1512)
8. Sofie, born and died 1417.
9. Dorothea (9 February 1420–19 January 1491, Rehna), married:
  1. in 1432 Duke Henry IV, Duke of Mecklenburg (1417–1477)
10. Frederick "the Fat" (c. 1424–6 October 1463, Tangermünde), Lord of Altmark, married:
  1. in 1449 Princess Agnes of Pomerania (1436–1512)

== Sources ==
- Mast, Peter: Die Hohenzollern - Von Friedrich III. bis Wilhelm II., Graz, Wien, Köln 1994

Frederick I of Brandenburg House of Hohenzollern Born: 21 September 1371 Died: 20 September 1440
German nobility
Preceded by Frederick V	Burgrave of Nuremberg; 1397–1427 with John III (1397–1420)	Burgraviate abolished Title retained
New title Division of inheritance	Margrave of Brandenburg-Ansbach; 1398–1440	Succeeded by Albert Achilles
Preceded by Sigismund	Elector of Brandenburg; 1415–1440	Succeeded by Frederick II
Preceded by Sigismund	Margrave of Brandenburg; 1417–1426	Succeeded by John the Alchemist
Preceded by John III	Margrave of Brandenburg-Kulmbach; 1420–1440	Succeeded by John the Alchemist
