= Burkhard I of Zollern =

First documented member of the Hohenzollern dynasty

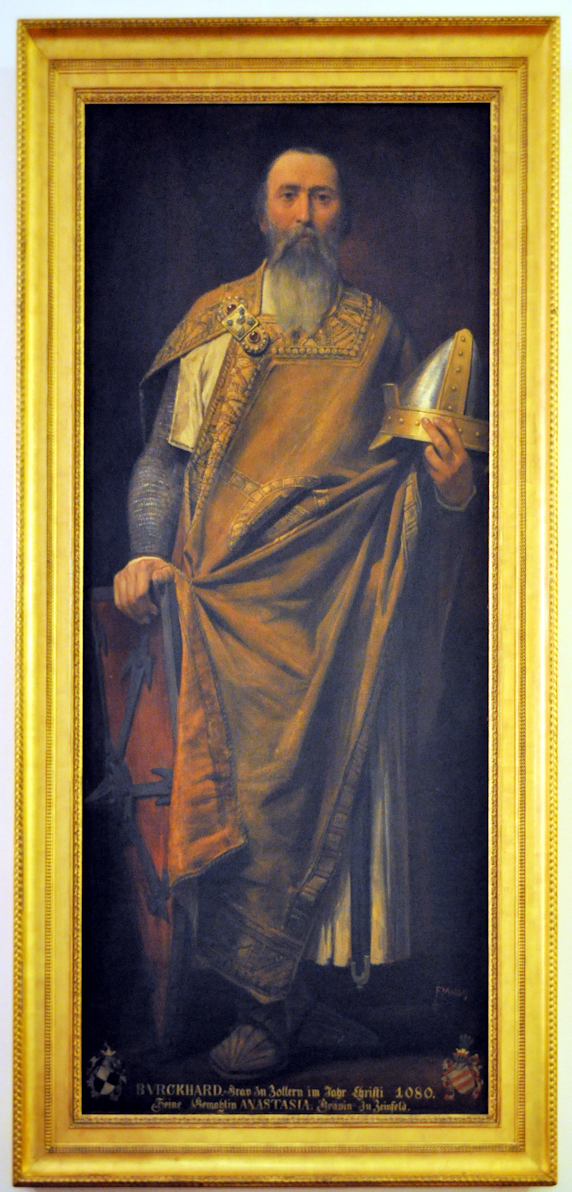
- Painting of Burkhard I from Peleș Castle

Lord of Zollern
- Reign: ? – 1061
- Successor: Frederick I, Count of Zollern (as Count of Zollern)
- Born: Before 1025
- Died: 1061
- Spouse: Anastasia von Rheinfelden
- Issue: Frederick I, Count of Zollern
- House: Hohenzollern
- Father: (possibly) Friedrich of Sülichgau
- Mother: (possibly) Irmentrud of Nellenburg

Burkhard I, Lord of the House of Hohenzollern (Latin: Burchardus, Burcardus; born c. before 1025; killed as part of a feud in 1061) is considered the first well-documented ancestor of the Hohenzollern dynasty. Because of his name, it has been attempted to link the Hohenzollern family's descent to the medieval Burchardings family, but without success. His father may have been Friedrich, a count in the Sülichgau area (roughly corresponding to today's Tübingen district). His mother may have been Irmentrud, the daughter of Count Burkhard of Nellenburg.

In the annals of the monk Berthold of Reichenau from the year 1061, Buchardus de Zolorin and Wezil de Zolorin are mentioned. Based on this source, Burkhard was killed due to a feud. Little is known about the aforementioned persons themselves, or their possible relationship.

The next documented member of the dynasty is Frederick I, Count of Zollern, who was probably a son or a grandson of Burkhard I. They are the direct agnatic ancestors of the Prussian dukes and kings, who later ruled as German Emperors, and the Kings of Romania.

Burkhard I of Zollern House of Hohenzollern Born: before 1025 Died: 1061
Unknown	Lord of Zollern	Succeeded by Friedrich I
