= Perchtoldsdorf =

Market town in Lower Austria

- Municipality
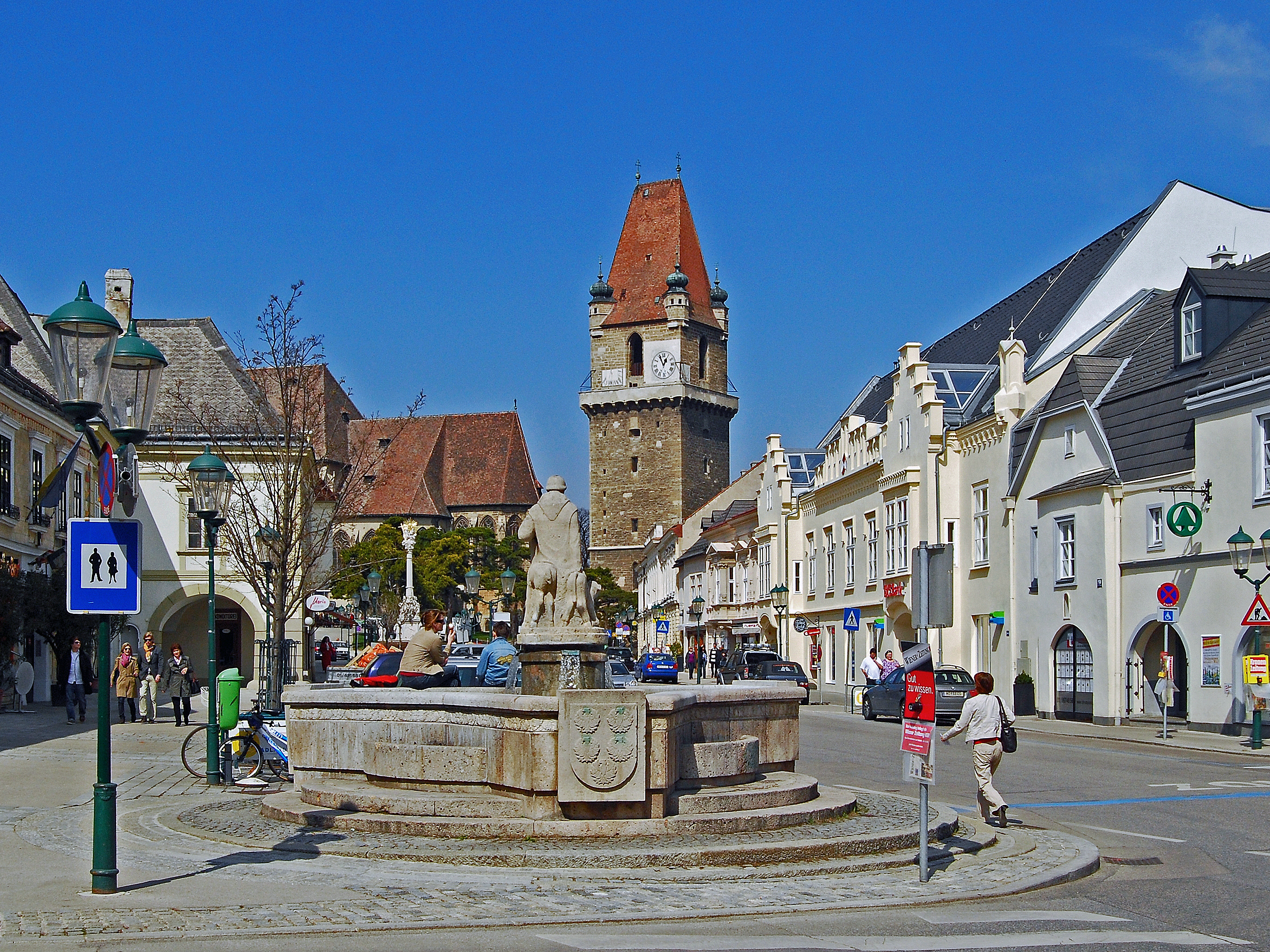
- Market square with Fortified Tower

- Coat of arms

- Location within Austria
- Coordinates: 48°7′N 16°16′E
- Country: Austria
- State: Lower Austria
- District: Mödling

Government
  - Mayor: Andrea Kö (ÖVP)

Area
  - Total: 12.6 km^{2} (4.9 sq mi)
- Elevation: 265 m (869 ft)

Population (2018-01-01)
  - Total: 15,047
  - Density: 1,190/km^{2} (3,090/sq mi)
- Time zone: UTC+1 (CET)
  - Summer (DST): UTC+2 (CEST)
- Postal code: 2380
- Area code: 01
- Website: www.perchtoldsdorf.at

Perchtoldsdorf (German: [ˈpɛʁçtɔlt͡sdɔʁf]; colloquially Petersdorf) is a market town in the Mödling District, in the Austrian state of Lower Austria. It is known chiefly for its winemaking.

== Geography ==
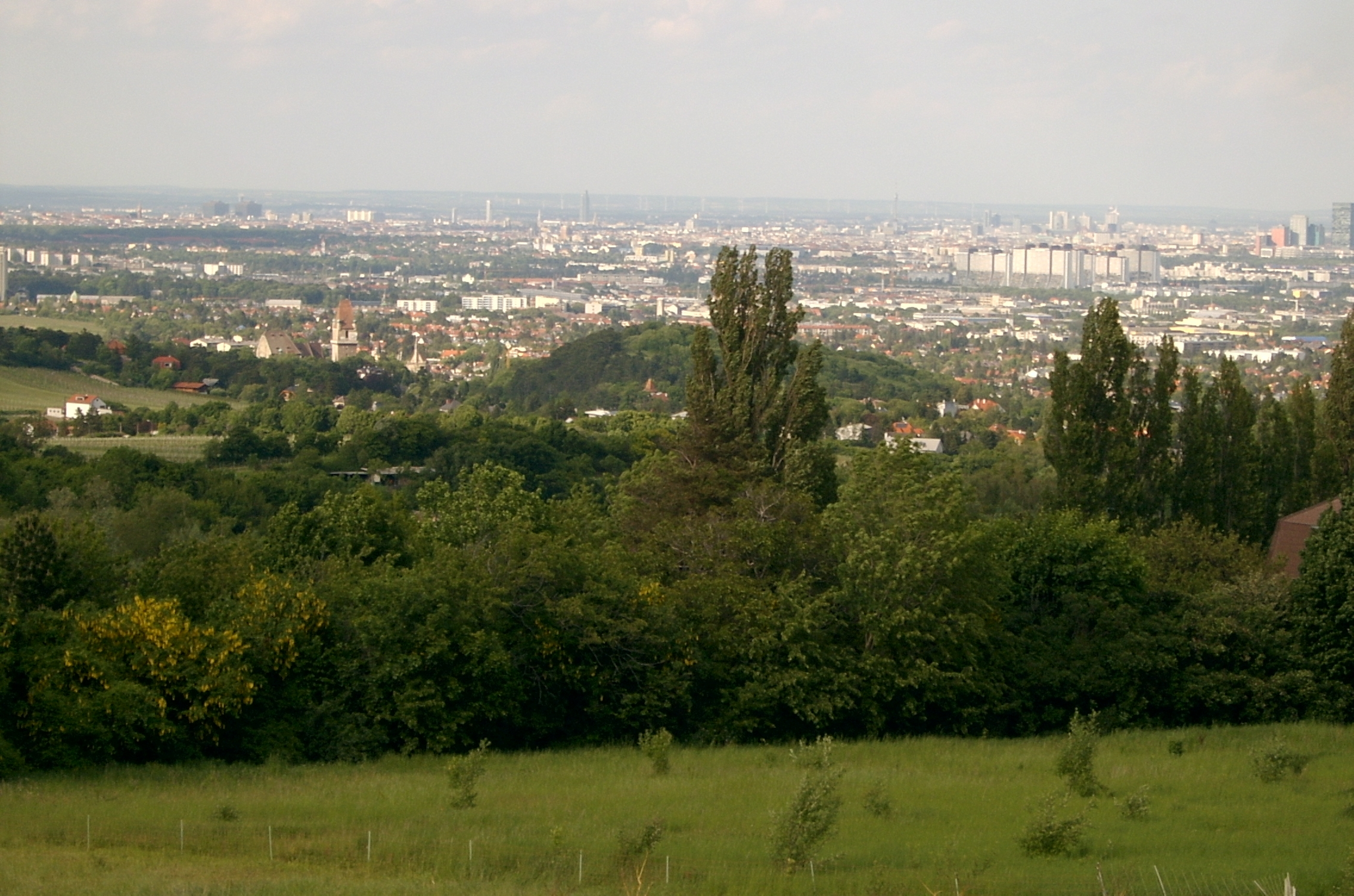
View over Perchtoldsdorf to Vienna Basin

It is located immediately at the Vienna city limits, south of the Liesing borough and about 16 kilometres (9.9 mi) southwest of the city centre. The western parts of the municipal area border on the Vienna Woods mountain range.

With a population of 14,614 (as of 2012), Perchtoldsdorf is the district's second largest municipality, after the administrative seat Mödling. It is served by the Vienna S-Bahn network and can also be reached by bus and tramway lines run by the Wiener Linien public transport company.

== History ==
The area formed a coast region of the Paratethys sea during the miocene epoch, documented by numerous fossilizations of marine creatures. Neolithic circular enclosures suggest the assumption that the plain was continuously settled from about 6000 BC onwards.

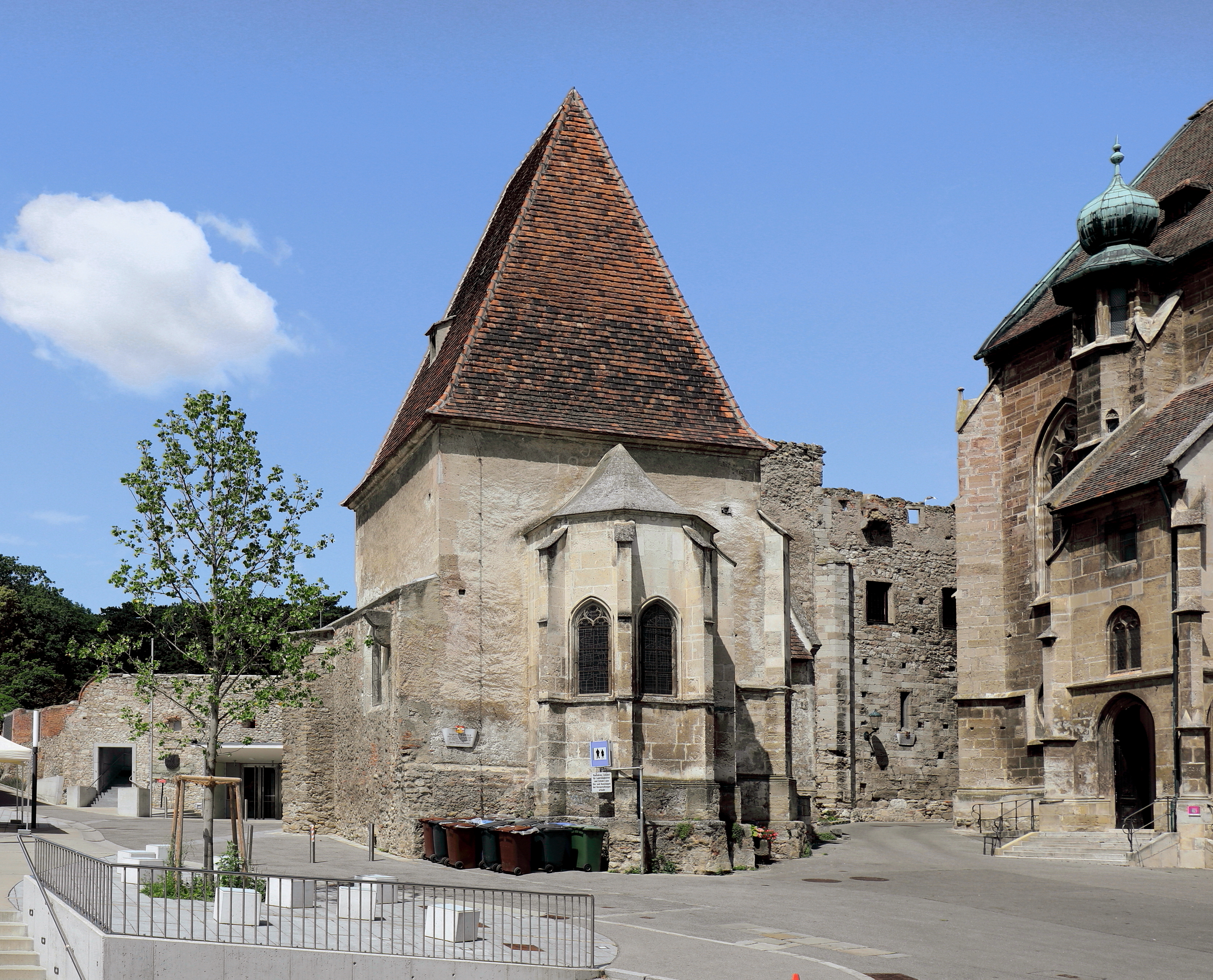
Perchtoldsdorf Castle

Perchtoldsdorf Castle probably was laid out before 1000 AD, part of a chain of fortifications along the eastern rim of the Vienna Woods. One Lord Heinricus de Pertoldesdorf was mentioned in an 1138 deed, during the Babenberg rule, while the region belonged of the March of Austria. The Babenberg margraves had to defend the newly conquered territories from the recently displaced Magyars on behalf of the Ottonian and Salian emperors. Their Perchtoldsdorf vassals continued to rule from the castle even when the Babenberg dynasty became extinct in 1246.

Upon the death of Otto von Perchtoldsdorf in 1286, the control passed to the House of Habsburg, uncontested rulers over the Duchy of Austria since the 1278 Battle on the Marchfeld. During this late medieval period, the settlement was granted market rights and Perchtoldsdorf Castle was used as a wittum residence for the widowed duchess-consorts of the Habsburg dynasty, including Beatrice of Hohenzollern, the widow of Duke Albert III of Austria. Duchess Beatrice established a hospital in 1407, now demolished, and an attached church which is still preserved.

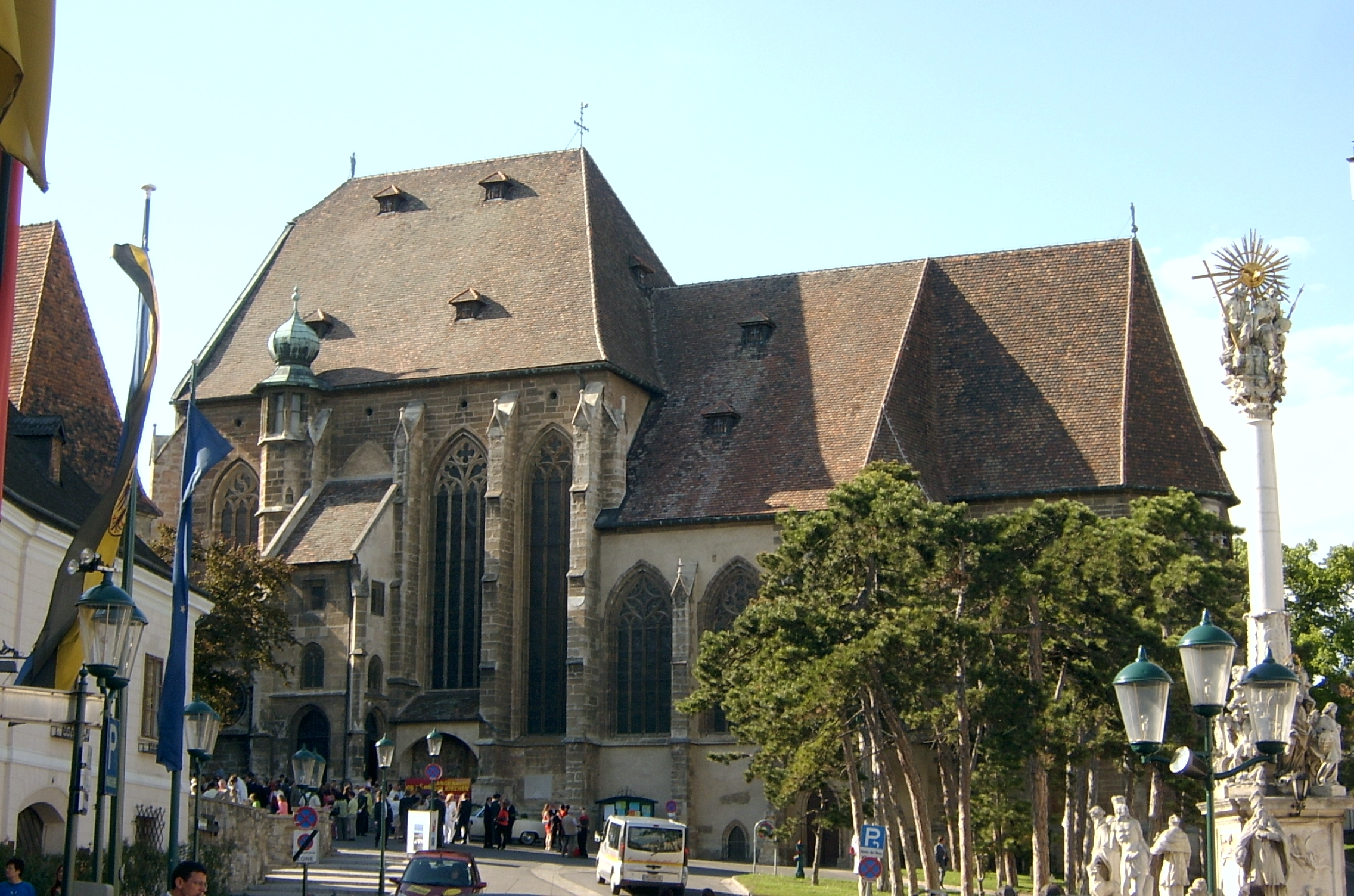
St Augustine Church

The conflict between the Habsburg emperor Frederick III and his younger brother Archduke Albert VI of Austria started an unstable period in the region. In 1446, many homes in the town were burned during the invasion of the Hungarian regent John Hunyadi. During this time, the castle was occupied by various rival forces, including mercenaries of King Matthias Corvinus from 1477 until about 1490, when Frederick's son King Maximilian I re-established Habsburg control over the area. This turbulent period interrupted the construction of the tower house (Wehrturm), the town's landmark with a height of 60 metres (200 ft), which started in 1450 and was finished about 1521. The tower and other fortifications permitted a successful defense of the city against the Ottoman troops under the command of Suleiman the Magnificent during the 1529 Siege of Vienna, while the surrounding area was devastated.

An Ottoman assault in a second siege in July 1683 destroyed the town and ended in a massacre. The Ottomans reneged on their surrender terms after the city capitulated and the keys had been handed over. When the Viennese defense commander, Count Ernst Rüdiger von Starhemberg heard of the post-surrender destruction of Perchtoldsdorf, he decided he could not trust a similar offer from the Ottoman commander Kara Mustafa Pasha to surrender Vienna.

In 1842, Perchtoldsdorf received access to the Austrian Southern Railway to Wiener Neustadt, whereafter the town became a tourist destination for vacations and visits to the nearby region of the Vienna Woods. It also continued a long history of viticulture and wine cultivation as the primary agricultural product.

Currently, the Perchtoldsdorf Castle's Maria Schutz parish houses a Ukrainian-speaking Orthodox Christian community.

== Population ==
Historical population
| Year | Pop. | ±% |
|---|---|---|
| 1971 | 11,486 | — |
| 1981 | 13,451 | +17.1% |
| 1991 | 14,051 | +4.5% |
| 2001 | 13,998 | −0.4% |
| 2011 | 14,566 | +4.1% |

== Media ==
The early full-colour feature film The Miracle was partly shot on location in and around the parish church in October 1912.

== Politics ==
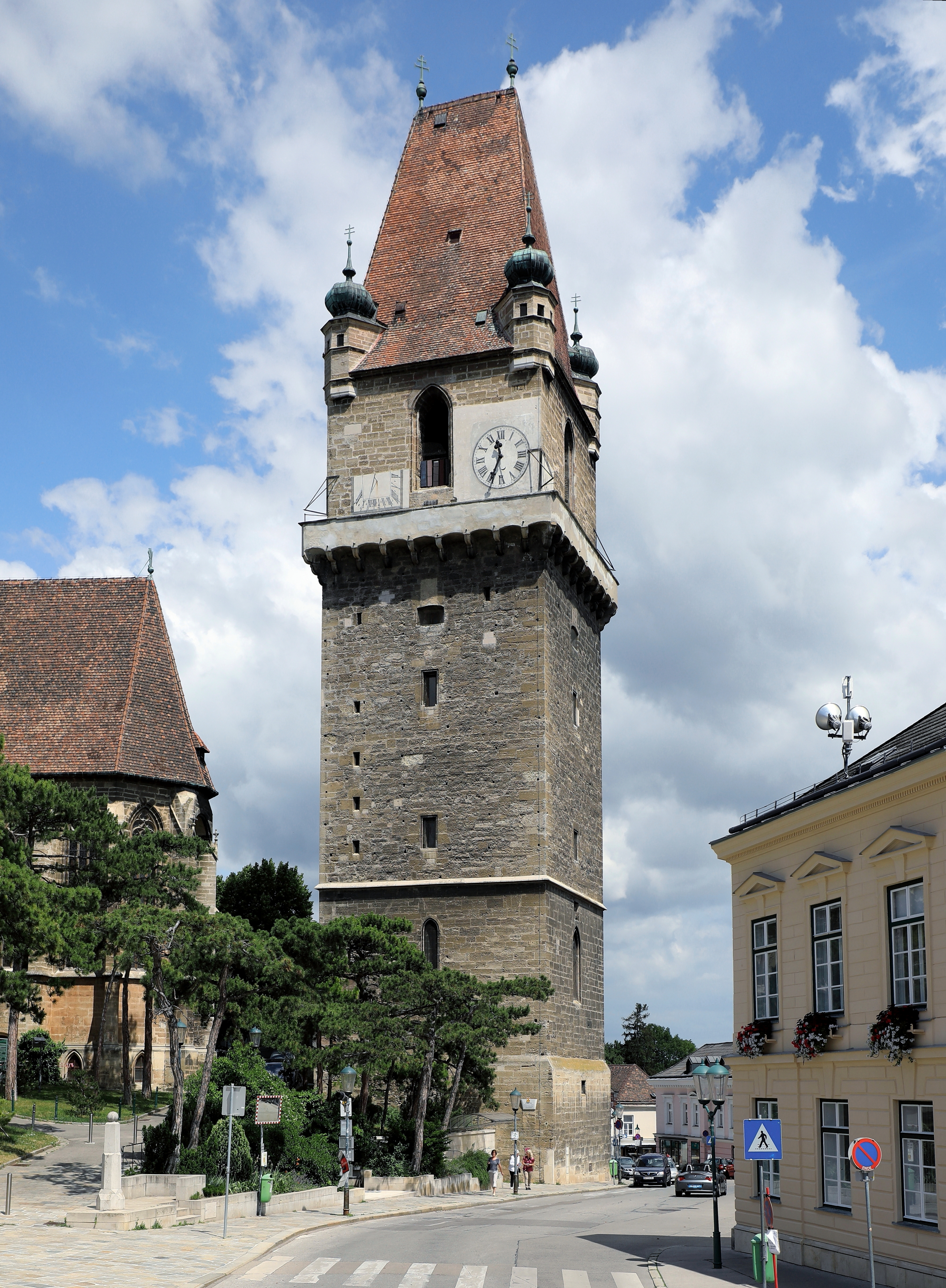
Fortified Tower

Seats in the municipal council (Gemeinderat) as of 2010 elections:

- Austrian People's Party (ÖVP): 24
- Social Democratic Party of Austria (SPÖ): 6
- The Greens: 4
- Freedom Party of Austria (FPÖ): 2
- Perchtoldsdorf Citizens' List (PBL): 1

=== Twin towns — sister cities ===
Perchtoldsdorf is twinned with:

- Donauwörth, Germany (since 1973)

== Notable people ==
=== Born in Perchtoldsdorf ===
- Tilly Bébé (1879–1932), lion tamer and circus performer
- Friedrich Eckstein (1861–1939), polymath and theosophist
- Alfred Merz (1880–1925), geographer and oceanographer
- Oswald Tschirtner (1920–2007), artist

=== Notable residents ===
- Ludwig Derleth (1870–1948), poet, lived in Perchtoldsdorf from 1927–1935
- Hans Fronius (1903–1988), painter and illustrator, lived in Perchtoldsdorf from 1916
- Josef Hyrtl (1810–1894), anatomist, lived in Perchtoldsdorf from 1869
- Siegfried Ludwig (1926–2013), politician and Lower Austrian governor, Mayor of Perchtoldsdorf
- Johann Siegmund Popowitsch (1705–1774), philologist and natural scientist
- Franz Viehböck (born 1960), electrical engineer and first Austrian astronaut, lived in Perchtoldsdorf for decades
- Hugo Wolf (1860–1903), composer, lived in Perchtoldsdorf in his later years, as did composer Franz Schmidt (1874–1939)
- Idan Raichel (born 1977), composer, producer, and songwriter
