= Raabs an der Thaya =

- Municipality
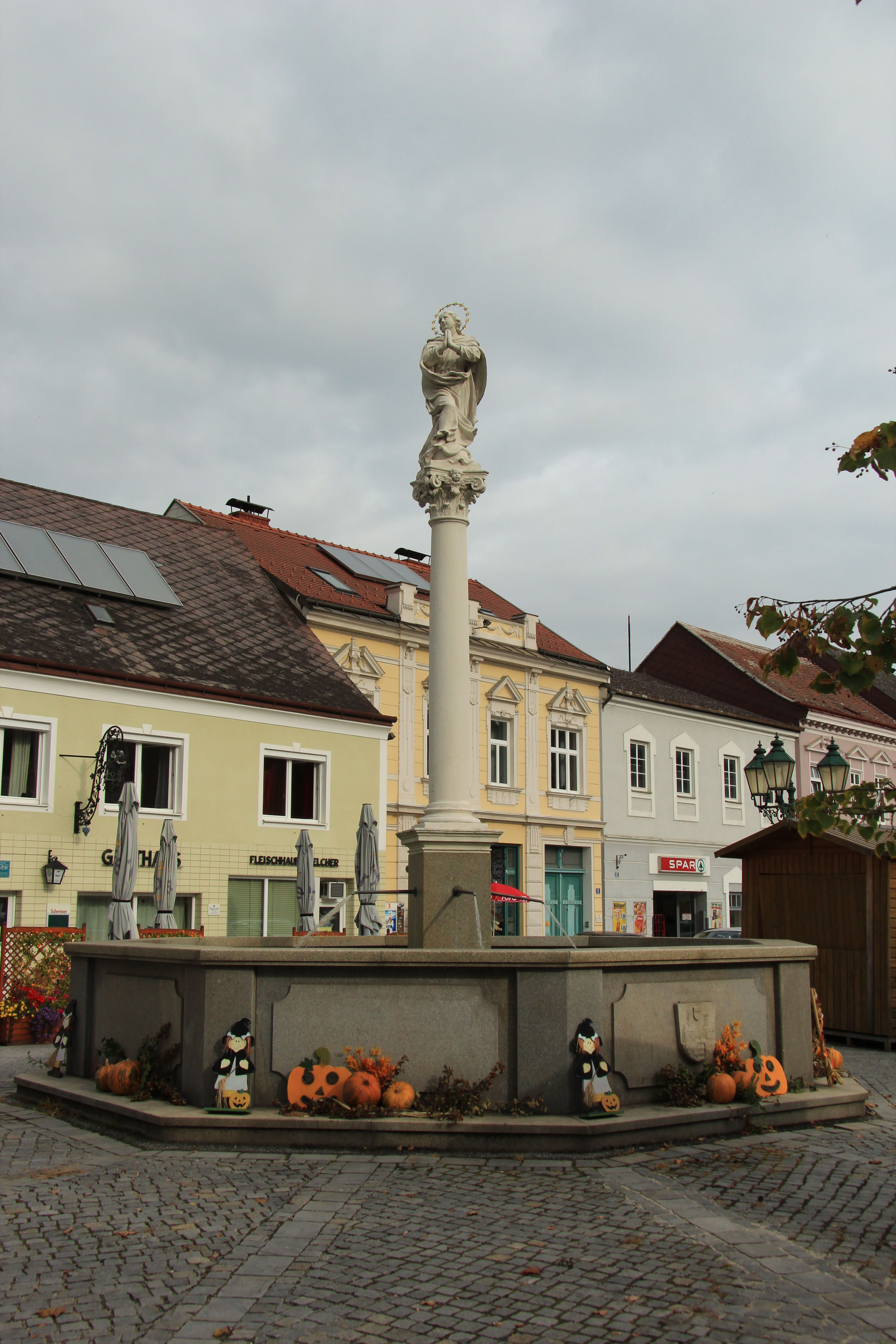
- Fountain in town centre

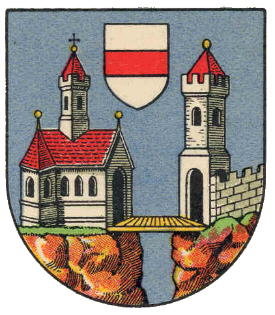
- Coat of arms

- Location within Austria
- Coordinates: 48°50′53″N 15°29′35″E
- Country: Austria
- State: Lower Austria
- District: Waidhofen an der Thaya

Government
  - Mayor: Rudolf Mayer (ÖVP)

Area
  - Total: 134.67 km^{2} (52.00 sq mi)
- Elevation: 410 m (1,350 ft)

Population (2018-01-01)
  - Total: 2,651
  - Density: 19.69/km^{2} (50.98/sq mi)
- Time zone: UTC+1 (CET)
  - Summer (DST): UTC+2 (CEST)
- Postal code: 3820
- Area code: 02846
- Vehicle registration: WT
- Website: www.raabs-thaya.gv.at

Raabs an der Thaya is a municipality with 3,114 inhabitants in Waidhofen an der Thaya (district) in the Waldviertel of Lower Austria, near the Austrian border with the Czech Republic. About 27.6 percent of the municipality is forested.

The German Thaya and the Moravian Thaya unite to form the Thaya at Raabs. Raabs Castle, built in the last half of the 11th century, has been exonymically called Rakous (formerly Rakús) by neighbouring Czechs, which is the origin in the Czech, in Old Polish Rakusy and Slovak name for Austria as a whole, Rakousko/Rakúsko.

== Population ==
Historical population
Year	Pop.	±%
1869	5,908	—
1880	5,980	+1.2%
1890	5,796	−3.1%
1900	6,039	+4.2%
1910	5,729	−5.1%
1923	5,913	+3.2%
1934	5,845	−1.2%
1939	5,531	−5.4%
1951	5,386	−2.6%
1961	4,576	−15.0%
1971	4,194	−8.3%
1981	3,748	−10.6%
1991	3,295	−12.1%
2001	3,114	−5.5%
2011	2,778	−10.8%
2021	2,644	−4.8%
