= Burg Raabs an der Thaya =

Castle in Lower Austria, Austria

Coordinates: 48°50′49″N 15°29′25″E

- Raabs an der Thaya, Lower Austria, Austria
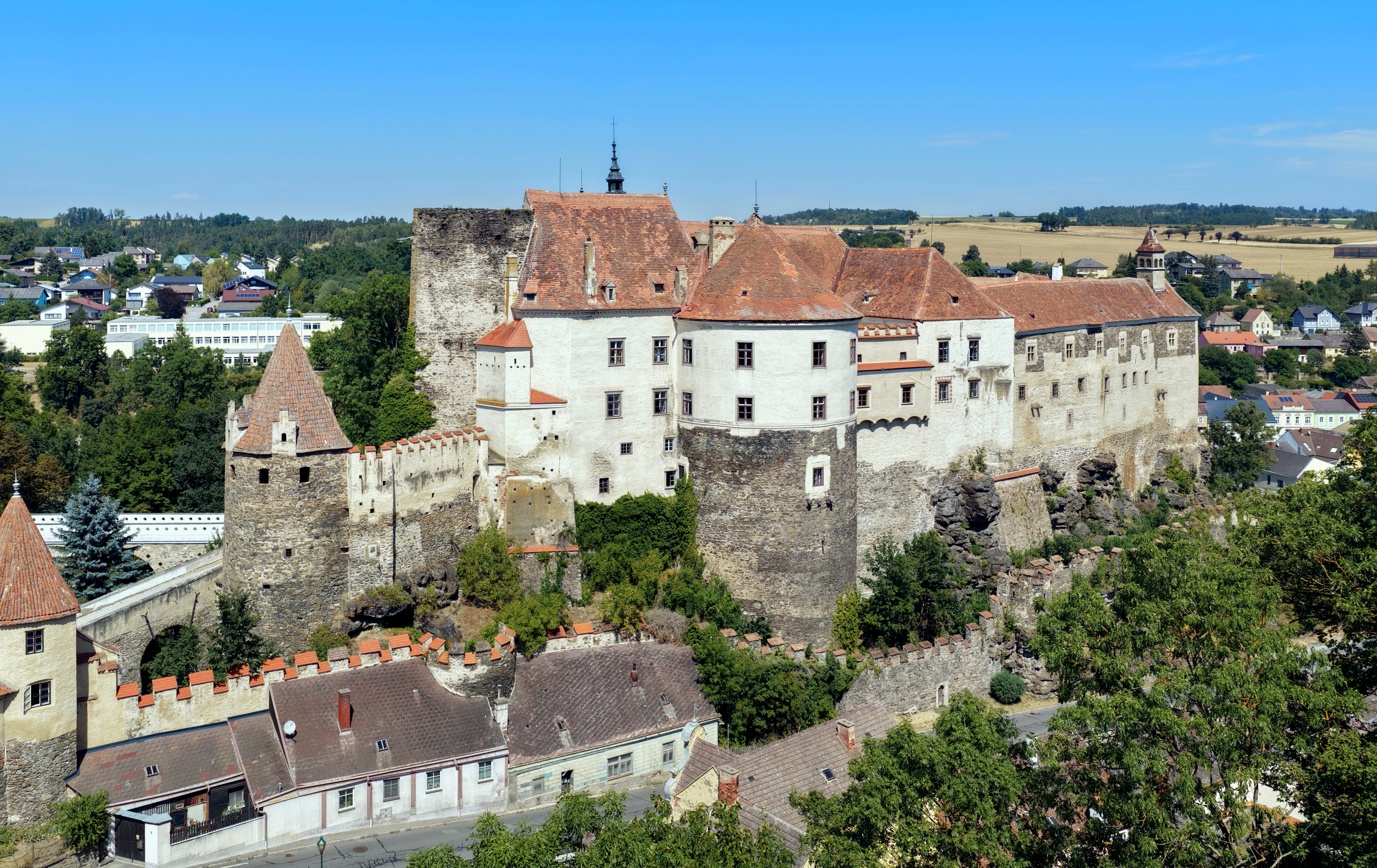
- View from the southwest

Site information
- Type: Castle

Burg Raabs an der Thaya is a castle in the municipality of Raabs an der Thaya, Lower Austria, Austria, built in the second half of the 11th century. It is 456 metres (1,496 ft) above sea level.

== History ==
The medieval history of this area begins with the old Moravian fortification in the Sand location, near Burg Raabs. This fortified settlement was discovered in 1992 by Kurt Bors. According to the results of dendrochronological dating, the Northern Wall was built between 926 and 929. However, the settlement was abandoned after several decades, probably destroyed by catastrophic fire by the Hungarian raid. Prior to being overthrown by the Hungarians, the Great Moravian Empire ruled today's Lower Austria, up to the Enns river. The first written records related to the lord of the castle "Gotfridi in castrum Racouz" is in the Bohemian Cosmas Chronicle from 1100. The forest areas "silva Rogacz" ("Rogacz forest", the territory around the later town Horn) are named in two royal gifts for the margraves of the Babenberg family dating from the years 1074 and 1076.

The castle has been called Rakous (formerly Rakús) by neighbouring Czechs, which is the origin of the Czech and Slovak name for Austria as a whole, Rakousko/Rakúsko.

Instability in South Moravia in the first half of the 11th century led to repeated conflicts. For example, in the Altahensis annales it is recorded that in 1082 the son of Margrave Adalbert took one of the towns at the present northern provincial border after it was forcibly taken from his father by the Přemyslids. After the extinction of the Raab Counts in the male line (around 1192) the western territory with the castle passed to Count Hirschberg-Tollenstein.

In 1252, Bohemian King Přemysl Otakar II acquired the whole county. The owner of the castle became Vok I. of Rožmberk from the Bohemian noble clan Vítkovci. In 1282, the castle passed to the Habsburgs, because after 1278 a large part of the county was confiscated by King Rudolf.

== See also ==
- List of castles in Austria
