= Edelfrei =

Distinguishable term

The term edelfrei or hochfrei ("free noble" or "free knight") was originally used to designate and distinguish those Germanic noblemen from the Second Estate (see Estates of the realm social hierarchy), who were legally entitled to atonement reparation of three times their "Weregild" (Wergeld) value from a guilty person or party. Such knights were known as Edelfreie or Edelinge. This distinguished them from those other free men or free knights who came from the Third Estate social hierarchy, and whose atonement reparation value was the standard "Weregild" (Wergeld) amount set according to regional laws. In the Holy Roman Empire, the "high nobility" (Hoher Adel) emerged from the Edelfreie during the course of the 12th century, in contrast to the so-called ministeriales, most of whom were originally unfree knights or Dienstadel.

In the Middle Ages edelfrei or hochfrei meant, in simple terms, that someone was a member of an ancient, dynastic aristocratic line. Free noble families were independent of legal obligations of a secondary nature, and they were not subordinated to any other families or dynasties, apart from the king or emperor. The modern concept of aristocracy (Uradel) must not be confused with the term edelfrei, since the former term's scope is much broader: all families that can prove they belonged to the knightly aristocracy by no later than around 1400 (whether originally edelfrei or ministeriales) are counted today as Uradel, i.e., the aristocracy.

Many edelfrei families submitted themselves during the course of the Middle Ages to more powerful feudal lords; these families are commonly referred to in the literature as "originally edelfrei". This submission did not always happen under duress. Many vassals attained high positions in the courts of their lords, and vassal service was often very lucrative. Especially at the time of territorial expansion and the emergence of a monetary economy, many Edelfreie were dependent on the protection and support of a powerful secular or ecclesiastical lord. And vice versa: a dependent relationship existed, in that larger territories could only be secured and managed with the aid of loyal vassals.

The number of edelfreie families was limited. A new social order, the ministeriales now arose rapidly. These officials, who were mostly unfree in their origins, managed within a century to elevate themselves to the lesser nobility. The differences between ministeriales and the old aristocratic families began increasingly to blur. For many aristocratic families that were originally edelfrei there is therefore no reliable evidence of their dynastic origins.
