= Burgrave =

Official title for the ruler of a castle in medieval Europe

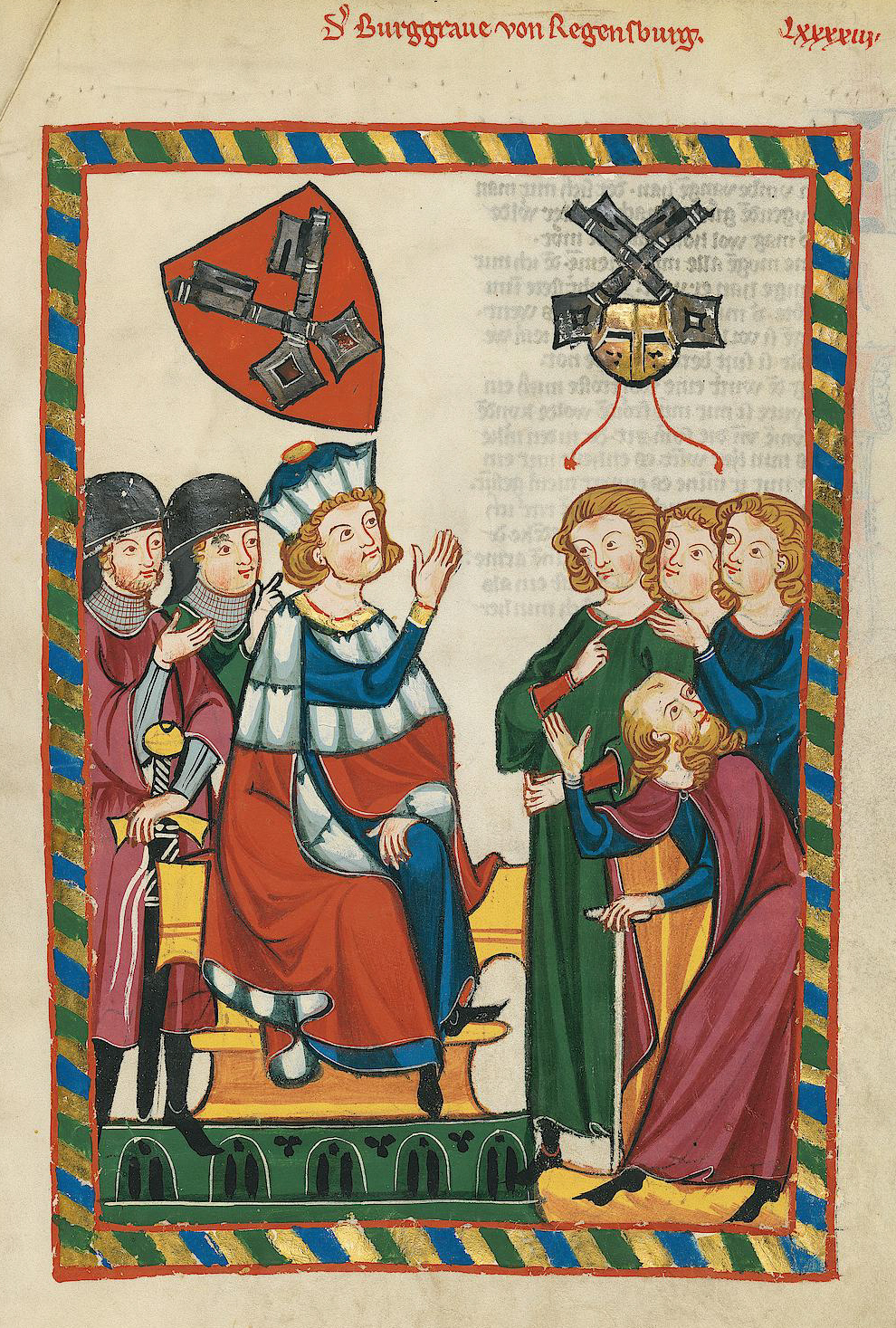
The Burgrave of Regensburg presiding over a trial, early 14th-century illustration in the Codex Manesse.

Burgrave, also rendered as burggrave (from German: Burggraf [ˈbʊʁkˌɡʁaːf], Latin: burgravius, burggravius, burcgravius, burgicomes, also praefectus), was since the medieval period in Europe (mainly Germany) the official title for the ruler of a castle, especially a royal or episcopal castle, and its territory called a Burgraviate or Burgravate (German Burggrafschaft also Burggrafthum, Latin praefectura).

The burgrave was a "count" in rank (German Graf, Latin comes) equipped with judicial powers, under the direct authority of the emperor or king, or of a territorial imperial state—a prince-bishop or territorial lord. The responsibilities were administrative, military and jurisdictional.

In time the position came to be a purely administrative position held by middle or high ranking civil servants.

A burgrave, who ruled over a substantially large territory, might also have possessed the regality of coinage, and could mint his own regional coins (see silver bracteates).

== History ==
Etymologically, the word burgrave is the English and French form of the German noble title Burggraf (compounded from Burg: castle, fortress or equally fortified town and Graf: count) from Middle High German burcgrâve. The feminine form is burgravine, in German Burggräfin (from Middle High German burcgrâvin).

From the early High Middle Ages, the German Burggraf (burgrave) was the military governor or commander of a castle, similar to that of the Anglo-Norman French "castellain" and Middle English "castellan" (from Latin: castellanus).

In the mid-12th century, King Conrad III of Germany created a new quality for the title of burgrave during the German eastward colonization. They became protectors and administrators of extensive royal territories near major imperial castles, such as Meissen, Altenburg and Leisnig, and received "judicial lordship" (German: Gerichtsherrschaft). They also acted as colonizers and created their own dominions.

Under the reign of King Rudolf I of Germany, their dignity was considerably advanced. Before his time, burgraves were ranked only as counts (Graf), below the princes (Fürst), but during his reign, they began to receive the same esteem as princes.

By the 18th century, the office of a Burgrave had become a purely administerative role, often held by the superintendents of castles or estates charged with the day-to-day management of affairs.

This trend continued into the 19th century, in which the role of the superintendent Burgraves began to be split between a number of people in order to better manage specific tasks. These positions were sometimes held by high ranking commoners who would assume, or be granted, the title of Burgrave.

Many of the original Burgriviate families, descended from its more prominent times, had progressed to the higher rank of Graf or the princely ranks of Margrave/Landgrave, Fürst and Herzog by this point (such as the Burgraves of Nuremberg and Meissen).

=== Holy Roman Empire territories ===
In the Kingdom of Germany, owing to the distinct conditions of the Holy Roman Empire, the title, borne by feudal nobles having the status of Reichsfürst (princes of the Empire), obtained a quasi-royal significance.

Like other officials of the feudal state, some burgraves became hereditary rulers. There were four hereditary burgraviates ranking as principalities within the Holy Roman Empire, plus the burgraviate of Meissen:

- The Burgraviate of Antwerp (in present-day Belgium): this was a title inherited from the Margraviate of Antwerp by the Counts of Nassau, lords of Breda, who later became the title Prince of Orange. The most famous holder was William the Silent, who used his influence over the city to control its local government and use it as a base for the Dutch Revolt. Subsequently in the Low Countries, the rank of burggraaf evolved into the nobility synonymous with viscount. The title "Viscount of Antwerp" is still claimed by the reigning monarch of the Netherlands as one of its subsidiary titles.
- The Burgraviate of Magdeburg,
- The Burgraviate of Friedberg,
- The Burgraviate of Meissen,
- The Burgraviate of Nuremberg: established by King Conrad III of Germany, the first burgraves were from the Austrian counts of Raabs, and then passed to the count's surviving son-in-law from the House of Hohenzollern, which, since Frederick I, Holy Roman Emperor, continued to hold it until 1801. It was still included among the subsidiary titles of several German semi-sovereign princes; the king of Prussia, whose ancestors were burgraves of Nuremberg for over 200 years, maintaining the additional style of Burggraf von Nürnberg.

=== Bohemia ===
In the Crown of the Kingdom of Bohemia, the title of burgrave was given by the King of Bohemia to the chief officer, or the regal official whose command is equivalent to a viceroy's. From the 14th century, the burgrave of Prague—the highest-ranking of all burgraves, seated at Prague castle, gradually became the state's highest-ranking official, who also acted as the king's deputy; the office became known as the high or supreme burgrave of the Kingdom of Bohemia (Czech: Nejvyšší purkrabí); the appointment was usually for life. After the reforms of Maria Theresa (reign 1740–1780) and her son Joseph II (reign 1780–1790), the title of highest burgrave gradually lost its de facto power. The title of highest burgrave was still granted, however, and its holder remained the first officer of the kingdom. It was abolished in 1848.

=== Poland ===
In the Crown of the Kingdom of Poland, the burgrave (Polish: burgrabia, earlier also murgrabia) was also of senatorial rank (i.e. held a seat in the upper chamber of the Senate of Poland). Ranking first among them was the "Burgrave of Kraków" (Polish: Burgrabia krakowski) of the former capital of Poland and Wawel Castle, who was appointed directly by the King of Poland. The royal office was originally created during the reign of Casimir III the Great. At that time, Kraków's burgrave was also chief judge of the supreme court of Magdeburg law (Polish: Sąd wyższy prawa niemieckiego) erected in Kraków in lieu of Magdeburg. The burgrave of Kraków also collected an income from the royal Wieliczka Salt Mine, run by the Royal Salt Mines company Żupy krakowskie since the 13th century.

=== Prussia ===
In the Kingdom of Prussia, the burgrave was one of the four chief officers of a province, delegated by the King of Prussia.

=== Sweden ===
In Sweden, the burgrave (Swedish: burggreve, earlier spelling burggrefve) was the highest official in the cities of Gothenburg and Malmö during periods in the 17th and early 18th centuries. The title was first introduced by the king Gustavus Adolphus in the 1621 charter for Gothenburg, though it was not actually used until 1625. The burgrave of Gothenburg was to protect the "highness, reputation and regalia" of the monarch and was appointed by him or her from a group of six candidates proposed by the city board. In Gothenburg, the title ceased to be used in 1683 but was briefly reintroduced by Charles XII between 1716 and 1719. Now appointed among three candidates, the burgrave was the executive of the city, keeping the city keys and supervising the board. Following the Gothenburg model, the title was introduced in Malmö by Charles X Gustav after the city was ceded to Sweden in 1658, but was abolished 19 years later in 1677.

=== England and France ===
In Anglo-French parlance, a burgrave was considered analogous to a viscount.

== See also ==
- Dohna Castle
- Burgmann
- Castellan
- Starosta
- Vogt
- Reeve
- Ministerialis
- List of the burgraves of Meissen
