= Lichtenau Fortress =

Fortress in Bavaria, Germany

Coordinates: 49°16′43″N 10°41′13″E

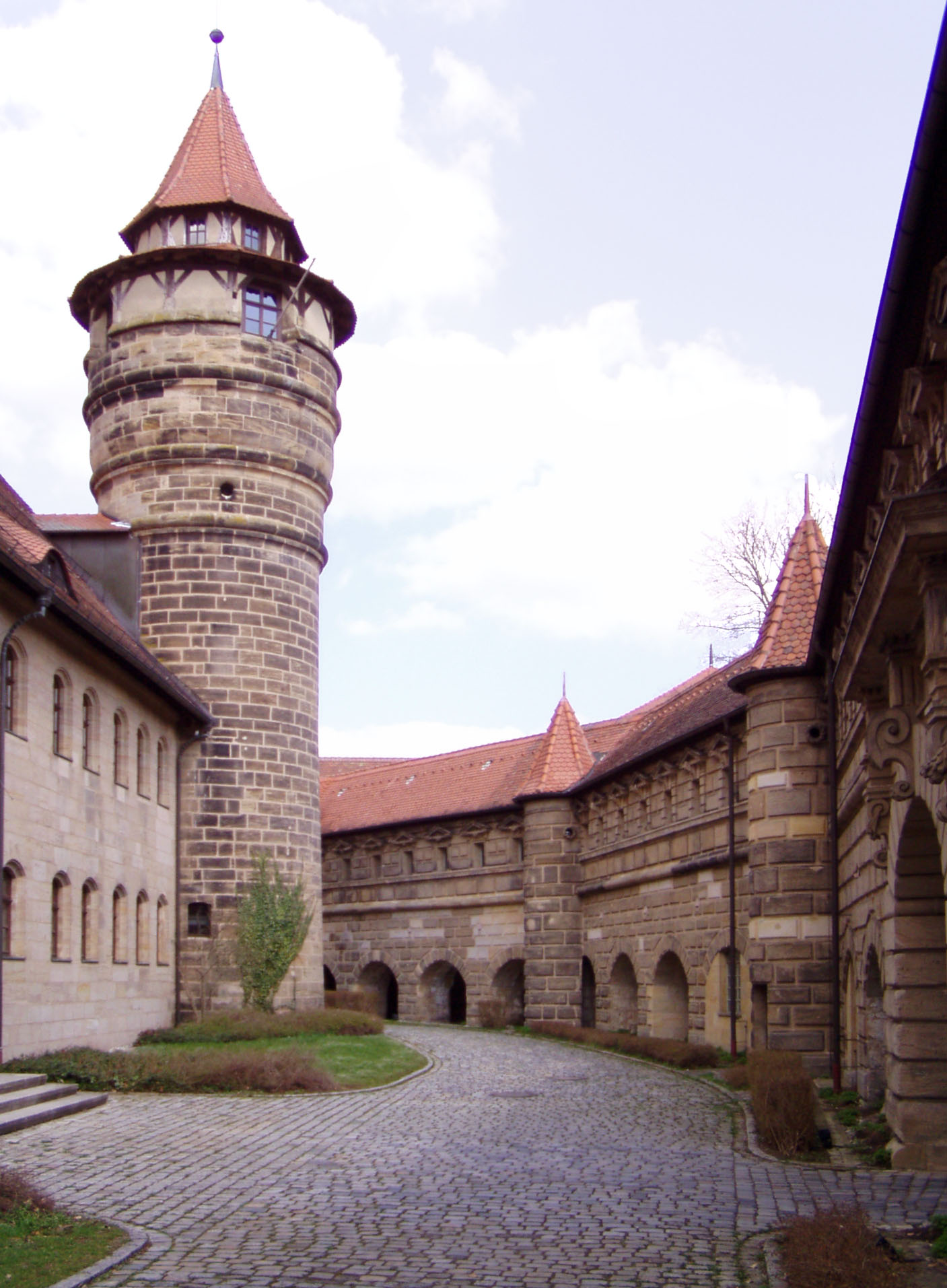
Inner courtyard of the fortress

Lichtenau Fortress (German: Festung Lichtenau) is a former fortification built by the Nuremberg castellans in the market town of Lichtenau in Middle Franconia.

== History ==
Aerial view of the fortress

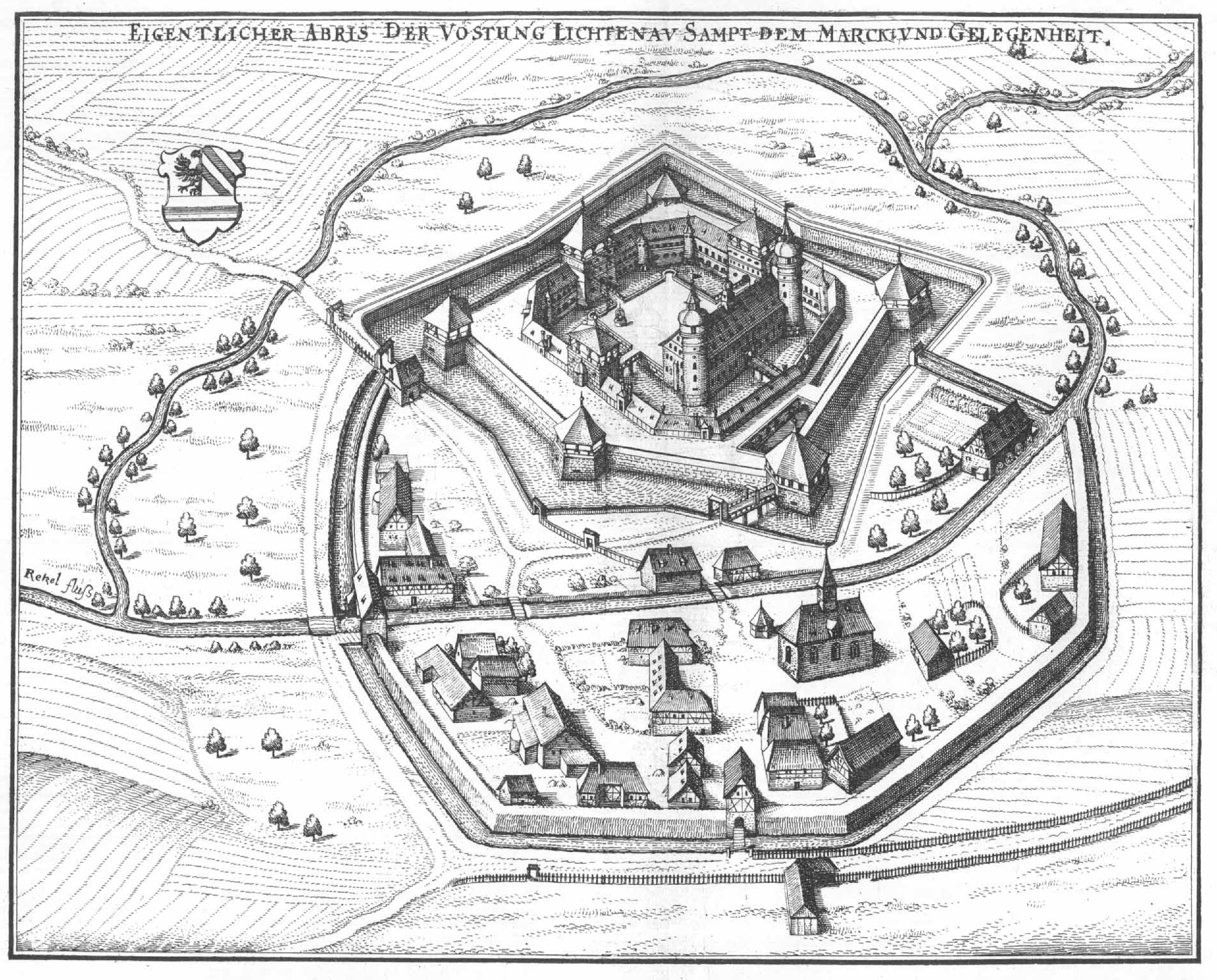
The fortress and the market town of Lichtenau (Matthäus Merian: Topographia Franconiae, 1648)

The fortress of Lichtenau goes back to a medieval water castle. In 1406 Nuremberg purchased the village and the castle of Lichtenau from Frederick II of Heideck. Because of the location of Lichtenau as a tactical outpost of the Imperial City of Nuremberg within the territory of the margraves of Brandenburg-Ansbach there was frequently tension and destruction as a result of warlike conflicts.

During the First Margrave War in 1449 Albrecht Achilles invaded Lichtenau, devastated the land and captured the castle. The castle was not returned until 1453. In the course of the Second Margrave War, in 1553, it was totally destroyed by Albrecht Alcibiades even though it had been surrendered without a fight. The Imperial City of Nuremberg had a completely new castle built (by Wolf Jacob Stromer, probably based on older plans by the architect, Antonio Falzon) for 194,000 guilders. Due to the level of destruction, the rebuild took until 1630 to complete. Barely a year later, the fortress was besieged by imperial troops and Georg Scheurl handed over the fortress, again without resisting, to the imperial commander, Tilly who, however, did not damage it. The last major attack on the fortress was in 1688, in a raid by troops of the French "sun king", Louis XIV. The French demanded that the pfleger, John Frederick Haller of Hallerstein surrender it. He, however, broke the tradition of handing it over without a fight and fought back, whereupon the French gave up storming the fortification.

In 1806 Lichtenau fell, like Nuremberg and the rest of Franconia, to the Kingdom of Bavaria, whereupon the fortress was used as a gaol. In this period, Lichtenau was governed inter alia by Ludwig von Redwitz (1779–1848) as governor of the gaol; his son, later the well known poet, Oskar von Redwitz, was born here in 1823.

Lichtenau Fortress is a splendid example of Renaissance architecture even though from a military perspective it did not represent the state of the art of fortifications at the time of its completion and was not easy to defend against siege artillery due to its location in a valley.

After thorough renovation, the fortress is used today by the Free State of Bavaria as a satellite site for the Nuremberg State Archives. The inner courtyard and the wall platforms are open during the day for sightseeing. Once a year in July the local history society organizes the castle festival. During this festival, which also attracts young people from the wider region, the castle is open to the public on two days.

== Literature ==
- Daniel Burger, Birgit Friedel: Burgen und Schlösser in Mittelfranken. ars vivendi Verlag, Cadolzburg 2003, ISBN 3-89716-379-9, pp. 154–157.
