= Margrave War =

Margrave War is a term applied to several conflicts within the Holy Roman Empire:

- Margraves' War (1308–1317)
- First Margrave War (1449–1450)
- Second Margrave War (1552–1555)
- Moravian Margrave Wars (14th–15th centuries)
