= Antonio Falzon =

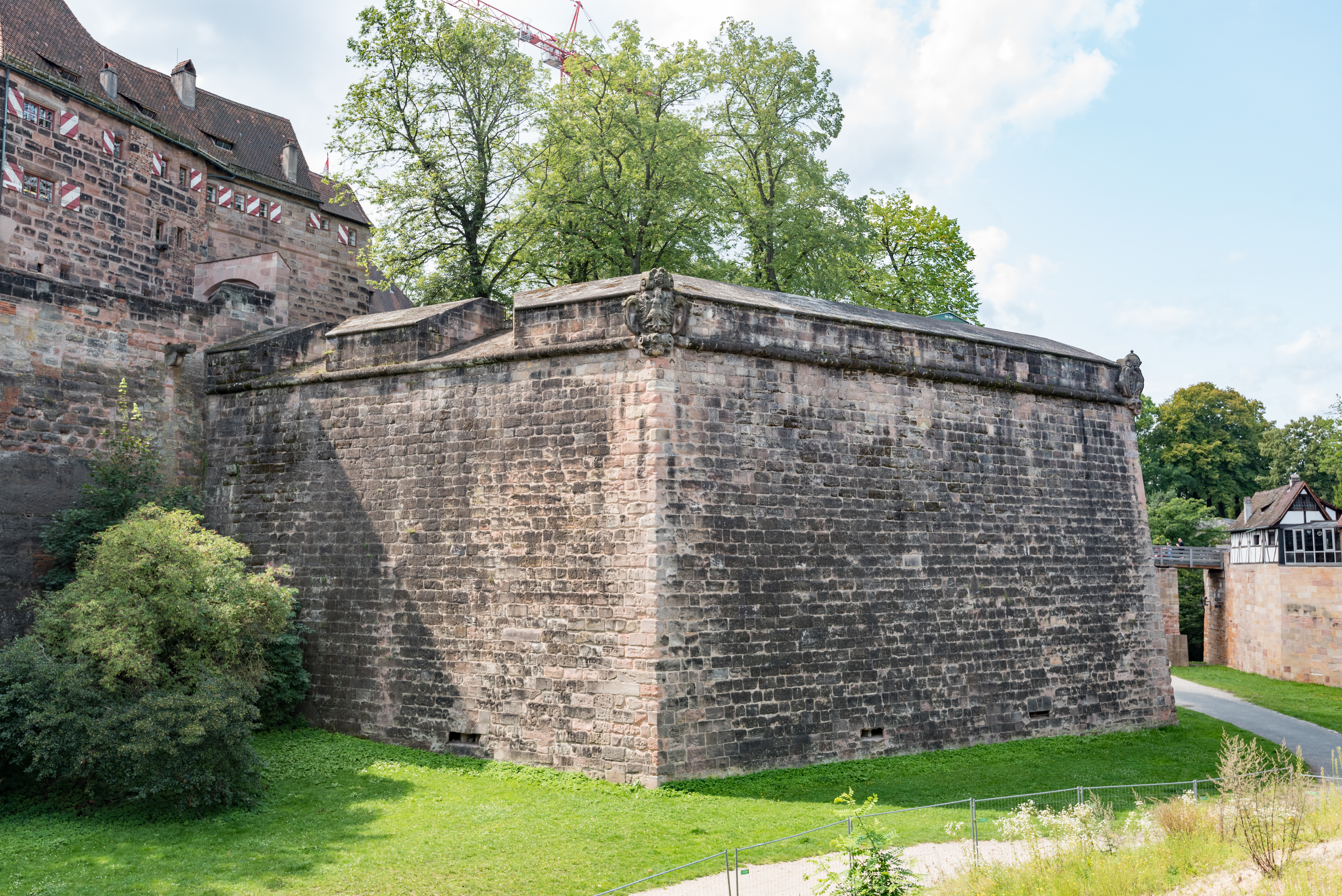
The Burgbasteien of Nuremberg Castle, designed by Falzon in 1538

Antonio Falzon (fl. 1538 – c. 1555), also known as Fazuni or by many other variants, was a Maltese architect and military engineer who was a pioneer of Renaissance military architecture in Europe. He is particularly known for his work in Nuremberg, Germany and he is credited with designing some of the earliest bastion fortifications north of the Alps. He is the earliest known notable Maltese architect.

== Career ==
Little information is known about Falzon, and his date of birth is not recorded. Falzon might have met Antonio Ferramolino, an Italian military engineer in the service of Emperor Charles V, during his visit to Malta in 1535. He might have accompanied him to Sicily, where Ferramolino was building the fortifications of Messina. Falzon probably traveled to the Holy Roman Empire after Ferramolino left Sicily for the Republic of Ragusa in 1537–38. The earliest known historical reference to him is a series of interviews dated 25 to 29 April 1538, when he introduced himself to council members of the Free Imperial City of Nuremberg as a skilled artist, architect and site foreman who had previously worked in the service of Charles V.

The councilors were impressed at Falzon's expertise in military engineering, especially since he was familiar with the Italian system of bastion fortifications which had revolutionized European military architecture. Soon afterwards he was commissioned to design improvements to the city walls of Nuremberg and the Lichtenau Fortress. Work on the Burgbasteien (also called Fazuni-Bastion after the architect) in the vicinity of the Nuremberg Castle began by July 1538 and were completed in late 1544 or 1545, and they are possibly the earliest example of bastioned fortifications in the Italian style ever to be built north of the Alps. Falzon designed other parts of the Nuremberg city walls in 1546, and he also designed gates or fortifications in the towns of Lauf an der Pegnitz, Hiltpoltstein and Hersbruck.

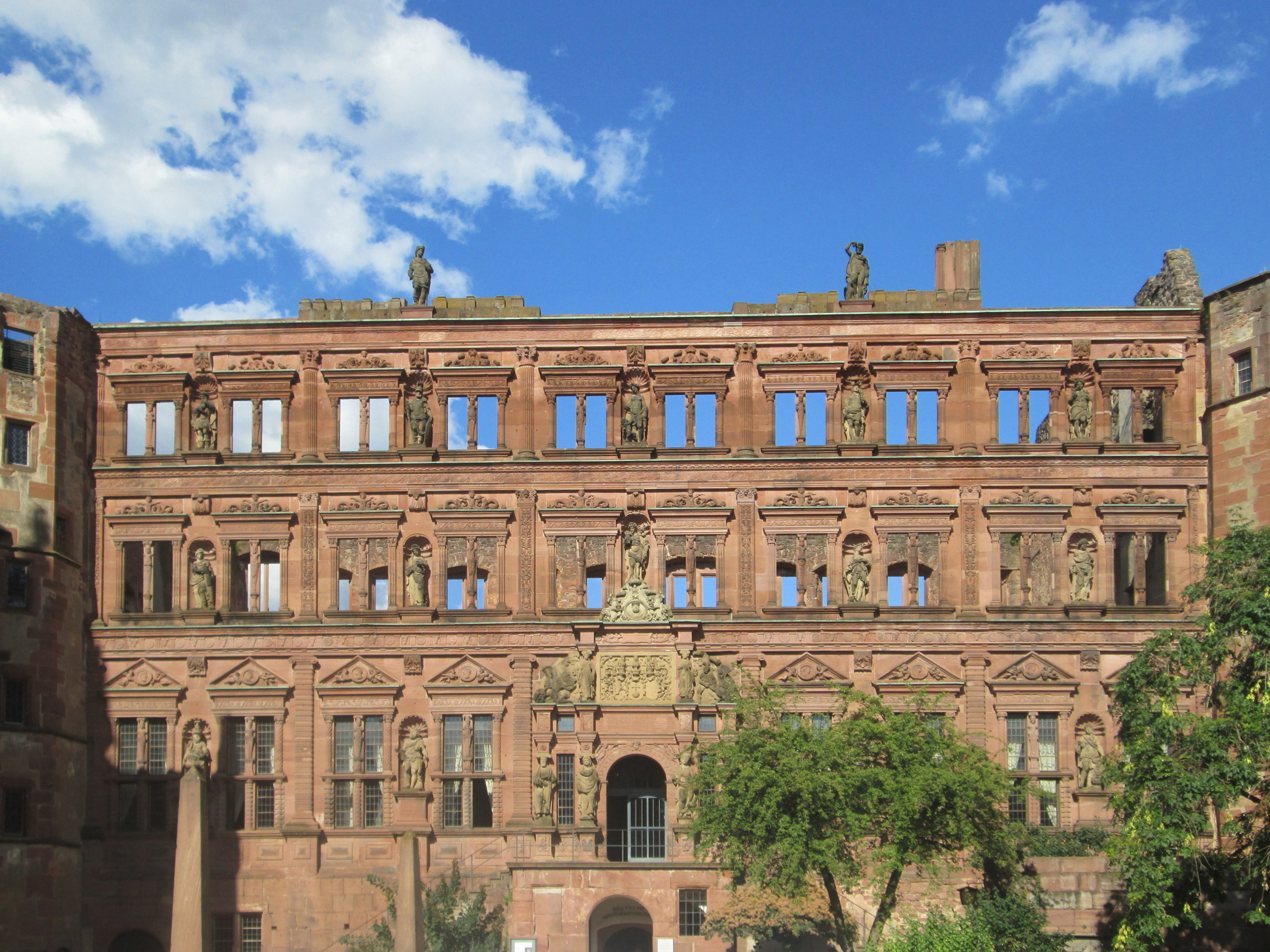
Ruins of the Ottheinrichsbau at Heidelberg Castle, possibly designed by Falzon in the 1550s

The last recorded reference to Falzon is in a report dated 21 April 1555, when he requested money from the city council members after being robbed in Italy. The councilors provided financial assistance but stated that at the time they did not have any work for him. It remains unknown if Falzon returned to Nuremberg, or went to Italy or Malta, but he is not mentioned in any later records. It has been speculated that he went to the Electoral Palatinate where he might have designed the Ottheinrichsbau at Heidelberg Castle, although there is no direct evidence supporting this attribution. The Piast Castle, which was built in 1547–53 in the Duchy of Brzeg and is now part of Poland, is sometimes also attributed to Falzon due to stylistic similarities with the Ottheinrichsbau. The architect of the Piastenschloss is recorded as being an Italian named Antonio di Teodoro, possibly referring to Falzon.

Some German historians refer to Falzon as a Renaissance man due to his interest in multiple areas. He seems to have been capable of designing and making tools and instruments, and he is also credited with introducing cornerstone medals (a medal commemorating the construction of a new building) into Germany during his work on the Nuremberg fortifications. Falzon's attempts to extend his activities into areas other than military engineering resulted in disputes with the city's powerful guilds. He is also known to have had a number of disputes or clashes with the authorities or his workers, and he was described as being arrogant.

== Legacy ==
Falzon is the earliest known notable Maltese architect, preceding better-known figures such as Girolamo Cassar and Tommaso Dingli. He was overlooked by Maltese historians until the early 21st century, probably since most documents referring to him can only be found in German archives and libraries. Many German historians identified Falzon as being Italian, but he referred to himself as being Maltese, and Falzon was the surname of a Maltese noble family. His surname is rendered in many different variants in German archival sources, including Faissant, Fazuni, Vazuni, Falsone, Vascani and Faggioni, and his real name likely was Falzon or Fauczun.
