= Nuremberg Castle =

Group of medieval fortified buildings in Bavaria, Germany

Coordinates: 49°27′28″N 11°04′33″E

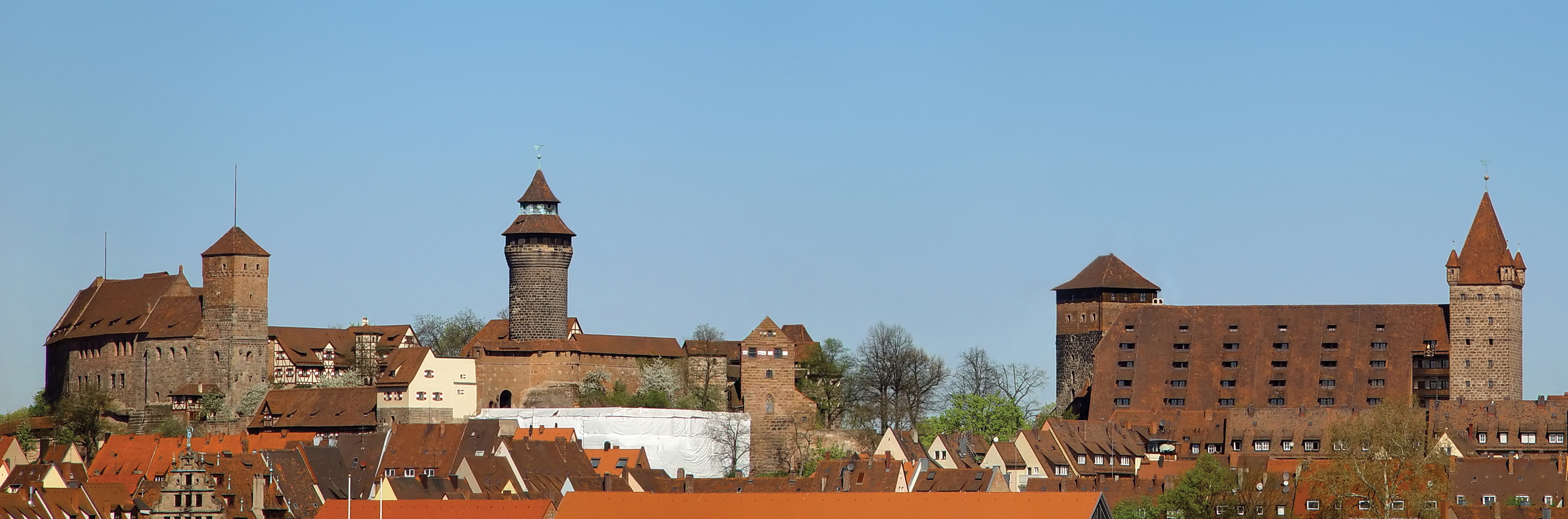
Nuremberg Castle: Palas, Imperial Chapel, Heathens' Tower on the left - Sinwell Tower in the middle left - Pentagonal Tower, Imperial Stables and Luginsland Tower on the right

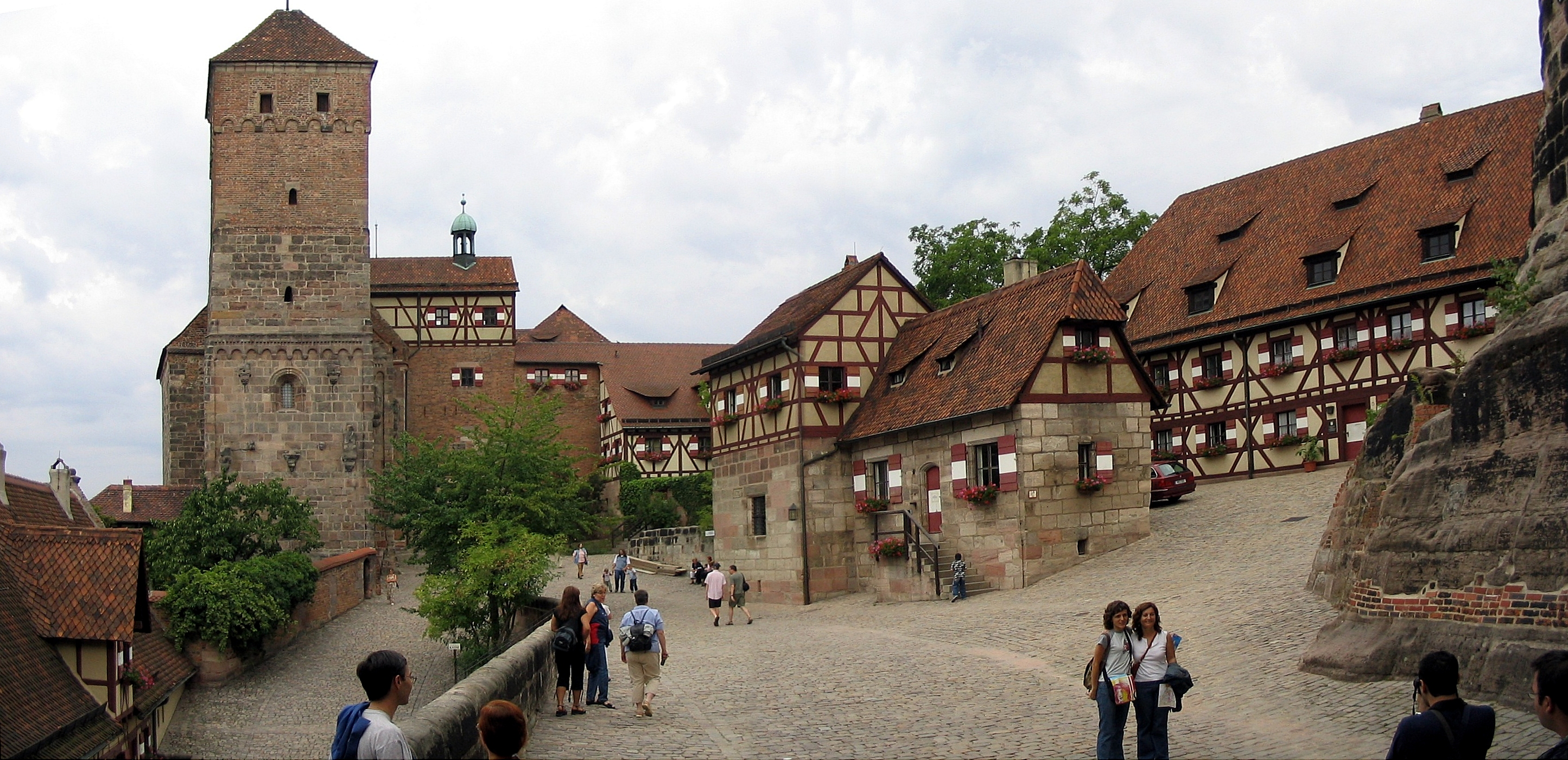
The courtyard with Heidenturm (Heathens' Tower), Kaiserkapelle (Imperial Chapel), and Tiefer Brunnen (Deep Well)

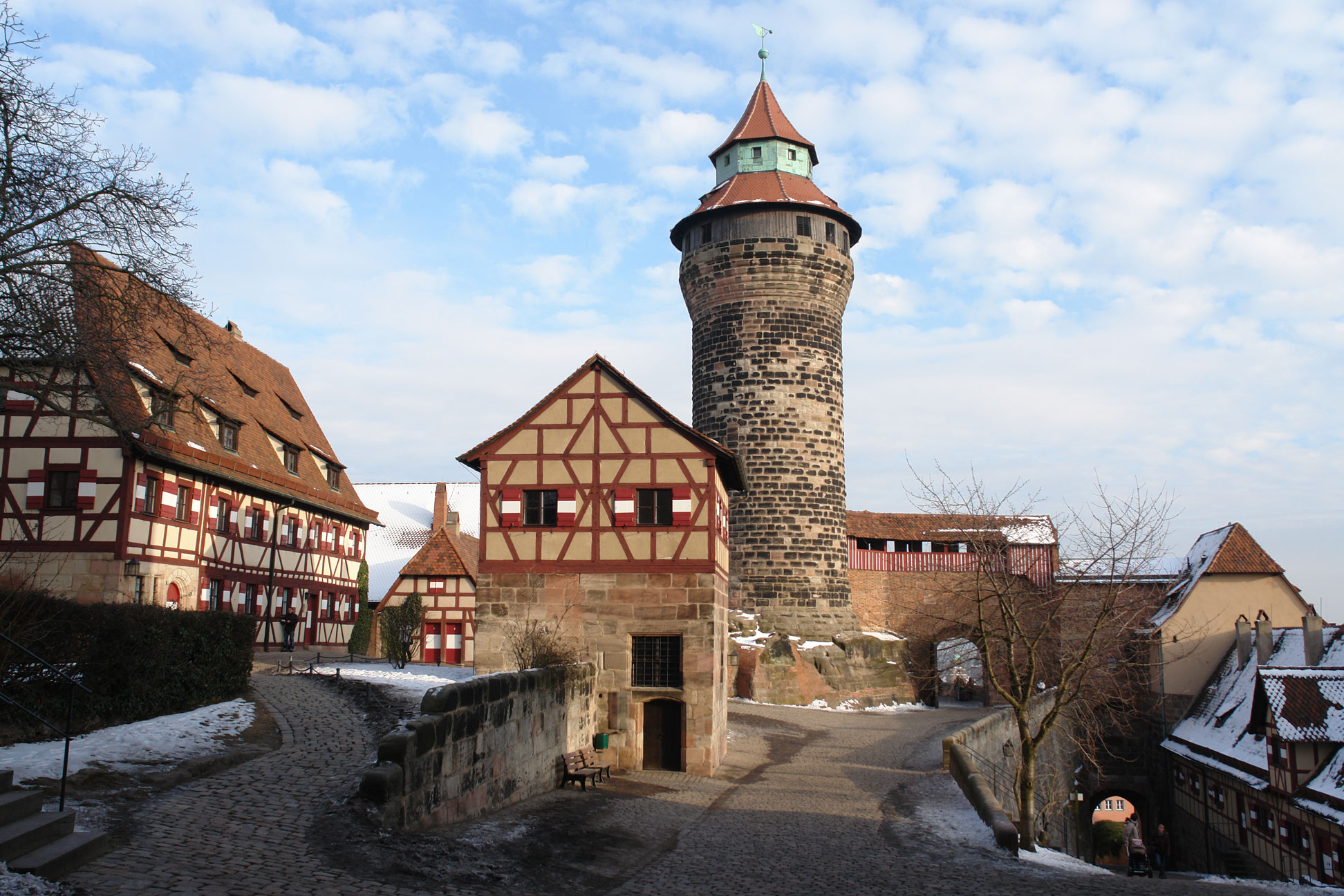
Tiefer Brunnen (Deep well, small building with gable roof in the middle) and Sinwellturm (Sinwell Tower)

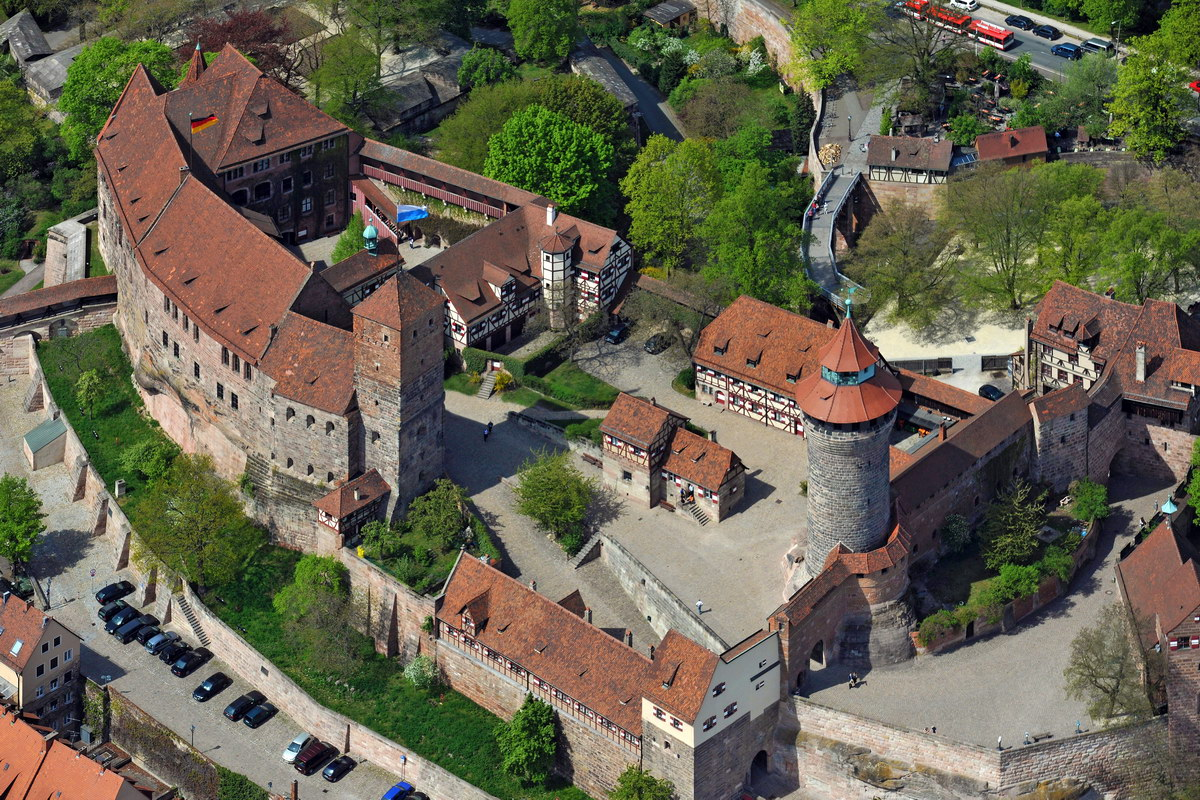
Aerial picture

Nuremberg Castle (German: Nürnberger Burg) is a group of medieval fortified buildings on a sandstone ridge dominating the historical center of Nuremberg in Bavaria, Germany.

The castle, together with the city walls, is considered to be one of Europe's most formidable medieval fortifications. It represented the power and importance of the Holy Roman Empire and the outstanding role of the Imperial City of Nuremberg.

== Summary ==
In the Middle Ages, German kings (respectively Holy Roman Emperors after their coronation by the Pope) did not have a capital, but voyaged from one of their castles (Kaiserpfalz or Imperial castle) to the next. Thus, the castle at Nürnberg became an important imperial castle, and in the following centuries, all German kings and emperors stayed at the castle, most of them on several occasions.

Nuremberg Castle comprises three sections: the Imperial castle (Kaiserburg), the former Burgraves' castle (Burggrafenburg), and the buildings erected by the Imperial City at the eastern site (Reichsstädtische Bauten).

The first fortified buildings appear to have been erected around 1000. Thereafter, three major construction periods may be distinguished:

- the castle built under the Salian kings respectively Holy Roman Emperors (1027–1125);
- a new castle built under the Hohenstaufen emperors (1138–1254);
- reconstruction of the Palas as well as various modifications and additions in the late medieval centuries.

The castle lost its importance after the Thirty Years' War (1618 to 1648). In the 19th century with its general interest in the medieval period, some modifications were added. During the Nazi period, in preparation of the Nuremberg party rally in 1936, it was "returned to its original state." A few years later, during World War II and its air raids in 1944/1945, a large part of the castle was laid in ruins. It took some thirty years to complete the rebuilding and restoration to its present state.

== Buildings ==
=== Imperial Castle ===
The usual access to the castle is via Burgstrasse ending in front of the sandstone ridge. A wide footpath leads into the outer courtyard through the Heavenly Gate (Himmelstor) situated next to the Hasenburg tower (named after the Bohemian Hasenburg family).

The Sinwell Tower built in the 2nd half of the 13th century was the major keep of the Castle. It is named after its cylindrical form: in Middle High German sinwell means perfectly round. In the 1560s, its height was increased by a further floor and a pavilion roof with a pointed helm.

The Deep Well (Tiefer Brunnen) inside the small half-timbered house in the middle of the courtyard is certainly as old as the castle itself, as it was the castle's only source of water. Its shaft reaches the water level in a depth of 50 meters (164 feet) and the water usually is 3 m (10 ft) deep. Above the water level, a niche was cut out of the rock for cleaning purposes. The lower stone walls of the building date from 1563. The little annex built in the following year was used as bathroom and changing room. The Deep Well provided sufficient quantities of water for normal consumption, but during Imperial Diets and visits by the Emperor, water barrels had to be transported on wagons from the city.

The Castellan's House (Kastellansgebäude), the Secretarial Building (Sekretariatsgebäude) and the Finance Building (Finanzstadel) as well as the post-medieval Himmelsstallung are further buildings in the outer court, to a large extent reconstructed after World War II.

The Inner Gate (Inneres Tor) leads to the Inner Courtyard (Innerer Burghof), surrounded by the Palas, the Imperial Chapel and the Kemenate. In the courtyard, remains of foundations of the Salian Period may be seen. In the middle, there is the Kunigunde Lime Tree planted in 1984, replacing older trees first mentioned in 1455 and named after Saint Cunigunde, consort of Emperor Henry II (Saint Henry).

The Palas, the main building of the Imperial Castle, has two floors which were used for official functions and as the Emperors residence. It was rebuilt and modified a number of times during the castle's history. It now houses the permanent exhibition »Emperor – Empire – City. The Imperial Castle in Nuremberg«.

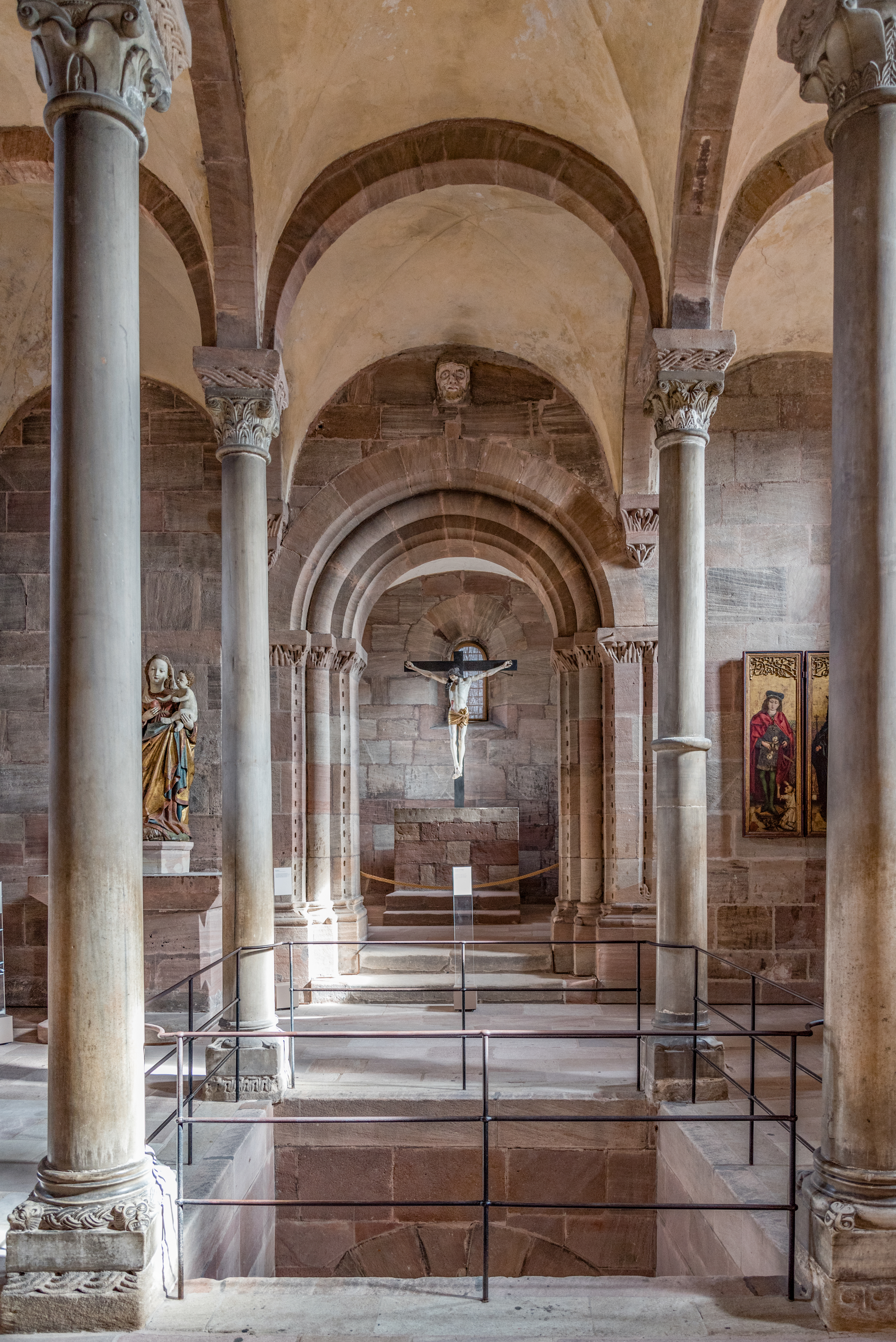
Upper Chapel

The Imperial Chapel (Kaiserkapelle), from an architectural point of view, is the most important building on the castle rock. It was built around 1200, at the same time as the original Palas. It is a romanesque double chapel consisting of two chapels one above the other and connected only through an opening in the ceiling, thus representing the hierarchical levels in the medieval society.

The Heathens' Tower (Heidenturm) stands next to the Imperial Chapel. It was built at the same time as the Chapel. When the Castle was restored for the visit of Emperor Charles V, heathen idols and pictures on the tower were removed, meaning romanesque sculptures, and thus the tower's name in colloquial parlance subsists until today.

The Kemenate (Ladies' Building) originally was built during the Hohenstaufen period, but later replaced by a large four storeyed building. The present building was burned down in 1945 and later reconstructed. At present, it houses the ticket office, the small museum shop and a multimedia show about the building history of the Imperial Castle.

=== Burgraves' Castle ===
The Burgraves' Castle was situated on the area between the Sinwell Tower and the Luginsland, but after its destruction in 1420 and the purchase of its remains by the city, very little is left.

The Pentagonal Tower standing above the northern rock face is among the oldest buildings on the castle rock. It was the keep of the Burgraves' Castle. Its lower part made of ashlars may have been built at the same time as the Imperial Chapel. During later gothic times, a storey of brickwork was added.

The Walburga Chapel appears to have been built shortly thereafter. It was originally dedicated to Saint Othmar, but after the city purchased the ruins of Burgraves' Castle, it was rebuilt and dedicated to Saint Walpurga. Destroyed in World War II, it was reconstructed and opened to the public in 1970.

=== Buildings erected by the Imperial City ===
The Luginsland (literally look into the land) was built in 1377 near the main gate of the Burgraves' castle, in order to enable the city to monitor the activities inside the Burgraves' Castle, at a time when the relations between the city and the Burgraves had already deteriorated.

The Vestner Gate was the only exit from the castle to the north, at that time an open land.

The Imperial Stables were built as a granary in 1494 to 1495 by Hans Beheim the Elder, Nuremberg's most important architect at that time. The ground floor was also used as stables. Severely damaged in World War II, it was renovated and is now a Youth Hostel.

The Bastions were built in 1538 to 1545 in response to the progress in artillery which threatened the northern side of the castle. At about the same time, the fortifications of the city of Nuremberg as a whole were renewed and extended.

== History ==
=== Pre-Salian and Salian period ===
Archaeological excavations within the castle unearthed remnants of walls dated around 1000, and in deeper strata even older ones that may be attributed to a building of Henry of Schweinfurt.

The first written record is of 1050, when Henry III issued the so-called Sigena document in Norenberc releasing a bondswoman. His father Conrad II, on voyages from Regensburg (Ratisbon) to Bamberg in 1025 and 1030, still had issued documents in Megelendorf, a small village some 4 km further to the east where the river Pegnitz could be crossed by a ford (presently Mögeldorf, a district of Nuremberg). In the customary way, these documents indicate the place and date of their issuance, but do not contain any reference to the type of the place (e.g. castle, village etc.).

Henry III used the castle in his campaigns to extend his rule over Bohemia, Poland and Hungary. Henry IV, who had been the opponent of Pope Gregory VII in the Investiture Controversy, at the end of his reign, in 1105, had to endure that in his absence, after a siege lasting two months, the castle was taken by his son Henry V and that at the end of the same year he was forced by his son to abdicate.

Upon the death of Henry V in 1125, the last member of the Salian dynasty, his elected successor Lothair of Supplinburg attempted to seize the crown lands from the Hohenstaufen Frederick II, Duke of Swabia and his brother Conrad who considered all these lands, including Nuremberg Castle, to be part of the Salian family property inherited by them. After several sieges, Lothair succeeded in October 1130 in capturing the castle.

=== Hohenstaufen period ===
Upon Lothair's death in 1137, the Hohenstaufen Conrad was elected King Conrad III in the subsequent year and soon afterwards started to build a new Imperial Castle which appears to have been completed during his reign. The new buildings comprised the Palas, the Imperial Chapel and the Heathens' Tower.

At about the same time, Conrad established the Burgraviate in order to ensure the safety of the castle in the absence of the king. Thus, the first burgraves from the Austrian House of Raabs built the Burgraves' Castle next to the Imperial Castle and were granted a substantial landholding in the vicinity.

Frederick I (Barbarossa) used the castle for a number of Diets and receptions, e.g. of a legation from the Eastern Roman Empire in 1156, but according to recent research, he did not contribute to the building of the Palace.

Henry VI apparently was engaged in various building activities related to the Palas, the Imperial Chapel and adjacent buildings.

After the last count of Raabs had died, his son-in-law Frederick of Zollern, in 1192, was granted the Burgraviate by Emperor Henry VI. The Zollerns, soon renamed Hohenzollern, held it until the Burgraves' Castle was destroyed and afterwards its ruins sold to the city of Nuremberg in 1427 (the Hohenzollerns, however, continued to administer their landholdings outside of Nuremberg).

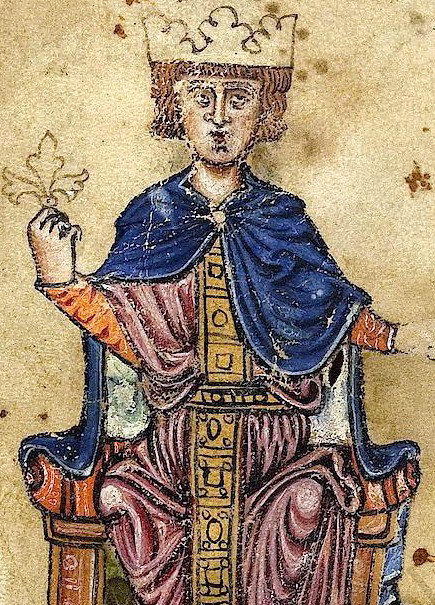
Frederick II

Frederick II, on the occasion of his first diet at the Imperial Castle in 1219, granted the Great Letter of Freedom (Großer Freiheitsbrief) to the city, including town rights, Imperial immediacy (Reichsfreiheit), the privilege to mint coins, and an independent customs policy, making the city an Imperial Free City subject only to the Emperor. Frederick II also transferred various responsibilities for the care of the Imperial Castle to the city. This was the starting point not only of a remarkable development of the city, but also of a long dispute between the city and the Burgraves.

Frederick II stayed at the castle at least 16 times, and his son King Henry (VII) of Germany as many as 21 times. In 1224, on the first diet of thirteen year old King Henry (VII), Walther von der Vogelweide was on the guest list, and in 1225, Henry (VII) was married at the castle to Margaret of Babenberg, daughter of Duke Leopold VI of Austria.

Frederick II made his last visit to Germany in 1236 and returned to Italy in 1237 for the remaining thirteen years of his life, leaving the German affairs to his son Conrad IV.

=== The Castle in the Late Middle Ages ===
The Interregnum ceased in 1273 with the election in Frankfurt of King Rudolf I, the first King of the Romans of the House of Habsburg. Immediately thereafter, Rudolf I attested a number of privileges to the Burgraves in consideration of their assistance in his election. Rudolf I held several diets at the Imperial Castle, and under his reign as well as under the reign of his successors Adolf of Nassau and Albert I of Habsburg, new buildings were added such as the Sinwell Tower, and works were executed on the Palas and the upper parts of the Chapel Tower (Heathens' Tower). During the same period, the Burgraves extended their adjacent castle.

==== The Burgraves' Castle ====
Both the Burgraves and the city improved their positions in the surrounding lands. The city of Nuremberg prospered and became one of the most important towns in Germany. The Golden Bull of 1356 named Nuremberg as the place of the first Imperial Diet of a newly elected ruler. The Burgraves' rise to power reached its climax when King Sigismund transferred the Margraviate of Brandenburg to the Hohenzollern in 1411.

Thus, it was inevitable that the relations between the city and the Burgraves on the castle hill deteriorated significantly. In 1367, the city obstructed the Burgraves' access to the city by a wall in front of their castle, and in 1377, the city erected the Luginsland tower (literally look into the land) near the main gate of the Burgraves' castle, in order to control the activities inside the castle. In 1388/89, there was an armed conflict which was settled. Finally, the Burgraves' Castle was attacked in 1420 by Duke Louis VII of Bavaria and burned down, probably with the consent of the city. In 1422, Sigismund transferred the care of the Imperial Castle to the city, and in 1427, Frederick I, Elector of Brandenburg sold the remains of the Burgraves' Castle to the city.

==== The Imperial Castle as part of the City ====
With the political and commercial rise of the city, the Imperial Castle became less attractive. Emperors started to execute their governmental acts in the town hall completed in 1340 and preferred to stay in the luxurious houses of the leading families rather than in the less comfortable castle. The castle continued to be used on important formal occasions. Frederick III appreciated the safety of the Castle and stayed there several months. The last king holding his first Imperial Diet in Nuremberg was his son Maximilian I. In 1491, he stayed at the castle for almost six months. His grandson and successor Charles V, because of epidemics raging at Nuremberg, relocated his first Imperial Diet to Worms. He visited Nuremberg only in 1541 on his way to the Imperial Diet in Regensburg.

=== Modern Era ===
At this time, in 1538 to 1545, bastions were built on the northern side of the castle to better protect it against an improved artillery, and the Castle was integrated in the renewed and improved fortifications of the city. The new fortifications were designed by the Maltese military engineer Antonio Falzon.

The subsequent Habsburg emperors concentrated on their territories mainly in Austria, Bohemia and Hungary. Thus, Nuremberg was rarely visited any more by acting rulers.

During the Thirty Years' War, in 1632, the armies of Gustavus Adolphus and Wallenstein appeared in front of the walled city, but were diminished less by their hostilities than by typhus and scurvy.

Neither the city nor the Castle fully recovered from the effects of the Thirty Years' War.

Since 1594, the Imperial Diet had met only in Regensburg. The Peace of Westphalia of 1648 not only ended the atrocities of the war, but led to the Perpetual Diet of Regensburg which from 1663 to 1806 seated in Regensburg. As a consequence, the Nuremberg Castle lost practically all of its importance and was left undisturbed by outside forces.

In 1806, during Napoleon's restructuring of central Europe, French troops occupied Nuremberg and, according to the Treaty of the Confederation of the Rhine (Rheinbundakte), handed it over to Bavaria, then raised to a kingdom.

In line with the Romantic Period's revived interest for medieval art and architecture, King Ludwig I of Bavaria, in 1833, ordered Carl Alexander Heideloff to execute restoration work, but the king was not pleased with his neo-Gothic style and stopped the work. His son Maximilian II later commissioned August von Voit to continue the refurbishment between 1852 and 1858 in a more moderate style.

In the 1930s, the general opinion of 19th century art and architecture had deteriorated. During the Third Reich, Rudolf Esterer, director of the Bavarian Administration of State-Owned Palaces, Gardens and Lakes, removed most of the previous installations and returned the Castle to what was thought to be its original state.

In World War II, the castle was damaged in 1944-45, with only the Imperial Chapel and the Sinwell Tower remaining entirely intact. After the war, the castle was restored under the direction of Rudolf Esterer and Julius Lincke to its historical form, including the Luginsland tower which had been completely destroyed.

The Castle is owned by the state of Bavaria and administered by its Bavarian Administration of State-Owned Palaces, Gardens and Lakes (Bayerische Verwaltung der staatlichen Schlösser, Gärten und Seen).

== In popular culture ==
- The Nuremberg Castle (ingame name Burgrave Palace) is the Military Castle Age Landmark of the Holy Roman Empire Civilization in Age of Empires IV
- The castle is also the setting of the 1992 id Software shooter and Wolfenstein 3D prequel, Spear of Destiny.
