= Falzon =

Falzon may refer to:

- Alby Falzon (born 1945), Australian surf filmmaker, photographer and publisher
- Antonio Falzon (16th century), Maltese architect and military engineer
- Candice Falzon (now Candice Warner, born 1985), Australian ironwoman, surf life saver and model
- Charles Falzon (born 1957), Canadian entertainment executive, dean of the Creative School at Toronto Metropolitan University
- Charlie Falzon, Canadian soccer player
- Dan Falzon (born 1972), Australian actor of Maltese descent, plays Rick Alessi on the TV soap opera Neighbours
- Daniel Falzon (born 1994), motorcycle racer
- Dyson Falzon (born 1986), footballer
- Janelle Falzon (born 1981), Australian Paralympic swimmer
- Joey Falzon (born 1969), footballer and manager
- Michael Falzon (actor) (1972–2020), Australian actor and singer
- Michael Falzon (politician, born 1945) (1945–2025), Maltese architect and politician
- Michael Falzon (politician, born 1961) (born 1961), member of the Maltese parliament
- Nazju Falzon (1813–1865), Maltese priest, beatified in 2001
- Stéphanie Falzon (born 1983), French hammer thrower
