= First Margrave War =

Military conflict

Date	1449–50
Location	Germany
Territorial changes	Restoration of the status quo ante

Belligerents
Brandenburg-Ansbach	Imp. City Nuremberg

The First Margrave War (German: Erster Markgrafenkrieg) from 1449–50 was the result of disputes between the Free Imperial City of Nuremberg and Albrecht III Achilles, Elector of Brandenburg. Numerous towns in Franconia in modern Germany were badly affected by the war.

On 13 August 1449, Albrecht captured Castle Lichtenau, a possession of Nuremberg. On 11 March 1450, Albrecht was defeated at Pillenreuther Weiher. The war ended with the signing of a peace treaty at Bamberg on 22 June 1450. Albrecht had to return all captured lands to the city of Nuremberg.

== See also ==
- Second Margrave War
