= Lichtenau, Bavaria =

Market town in Middle Franconia, Bavaria, Germany

Lichtenau
- Municipality
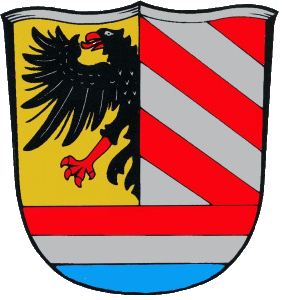
- Coat of arms

- Location of Lichtenau within Ansbach district
- Interactive map of Lichtenau
- Location within Germany Location within Bavaria
- Coordinates: 49°16′N 10°41′E
- Country: Germany
- State: Bavaria
- Admin. region: Middle Franconia
- District: Ansbach
- Subdivisions: 20 Ortsteile

Government
  - Mayor (2020–26): Markus Nehmer (SPD)

Area
  - Total: 41.35 km^{2} (15.97 sq mi)
- Elevation: 390 m (1,280 ft)

Population (2025-12-31)
  - Total: 3,802
  - Density: 91.95/km^{2} (238.1/sq mi)
- Time zone: UTC+01:00 (CET)
  - Summer (DST): UTC+02:00 (CEST)
- Postal codes: 91586
- Dialling codes: 09827
- Vehicle registration: AN
- Website: www.markt-lichtenau.de

Lichtenau (German pronunciation: [ˈlɪçtənaʊ]) is a market town in the district of Ansbach, Middle Franconia, Bavaria, Germany. A small village/town of roughly 3,780 population on the “Castle Road” theme route of Southern Germany. It lies at 390 meters above sea level with an area of 41.39 km^{2} (16 sq mi). A very traditional little town, it is also home to the “Veste Lichtenau” (castle) which now houses the Nuremberg Archives.

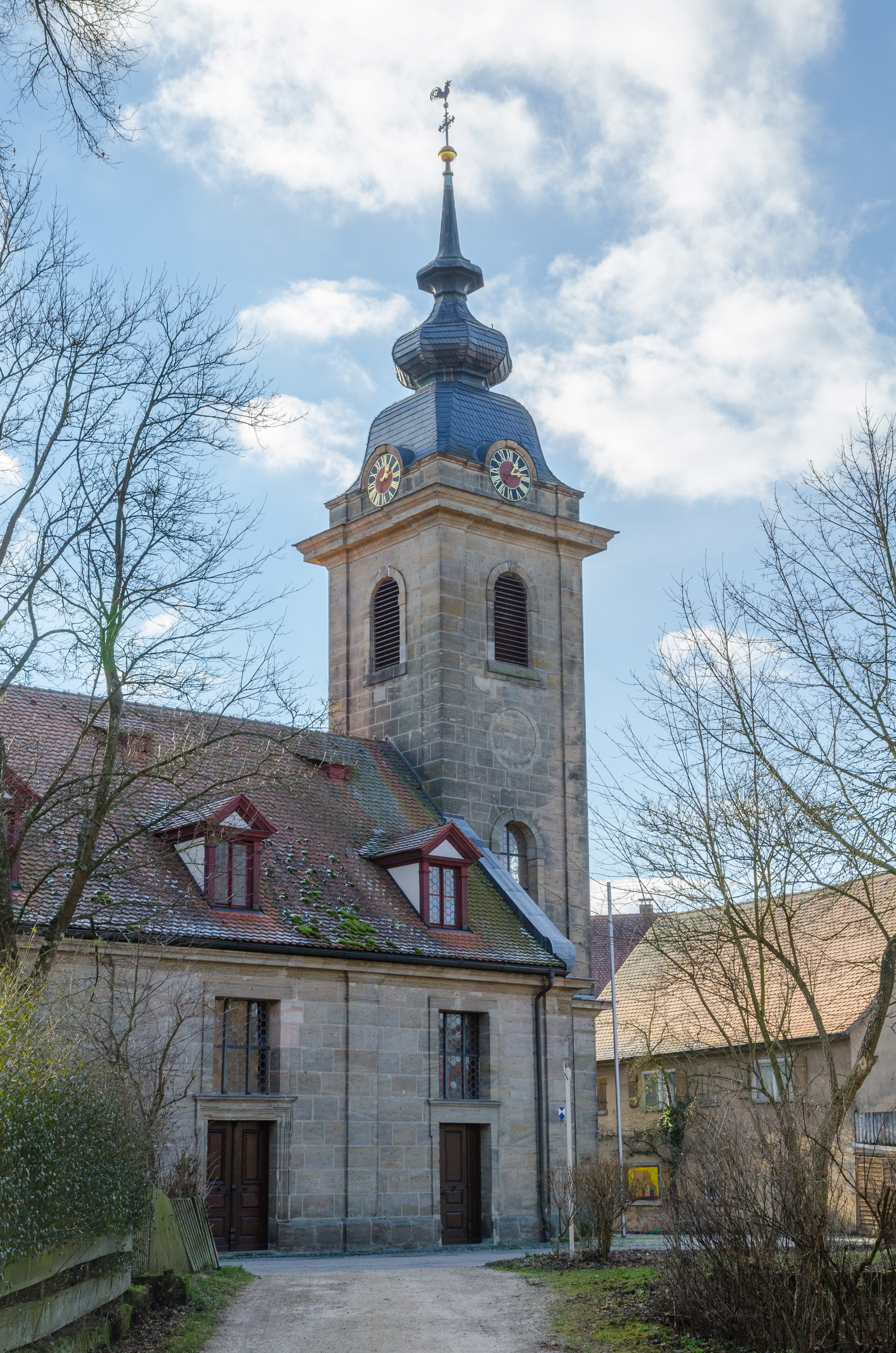
Trinity Church (Evangelical-Lutheran)
