= Second Margrave War =

Military conflict

Date	1552–55
Location	Franconia, Holy Roman Empire
Territorial changes	Restoration of the status quo ante

Belligerents
Mgvt Brandenburg-Kulmbach	Imp. City Nuremberg; Bp Bamberg; Imp. City Schweinfurt; Bp Würzburg; Abp Mainz; Abp Trier; Bp Speyer; Elct Saxony; Dc Brunswick-Lüneburg; Kgdm Bohemia; Mgvt Meißen

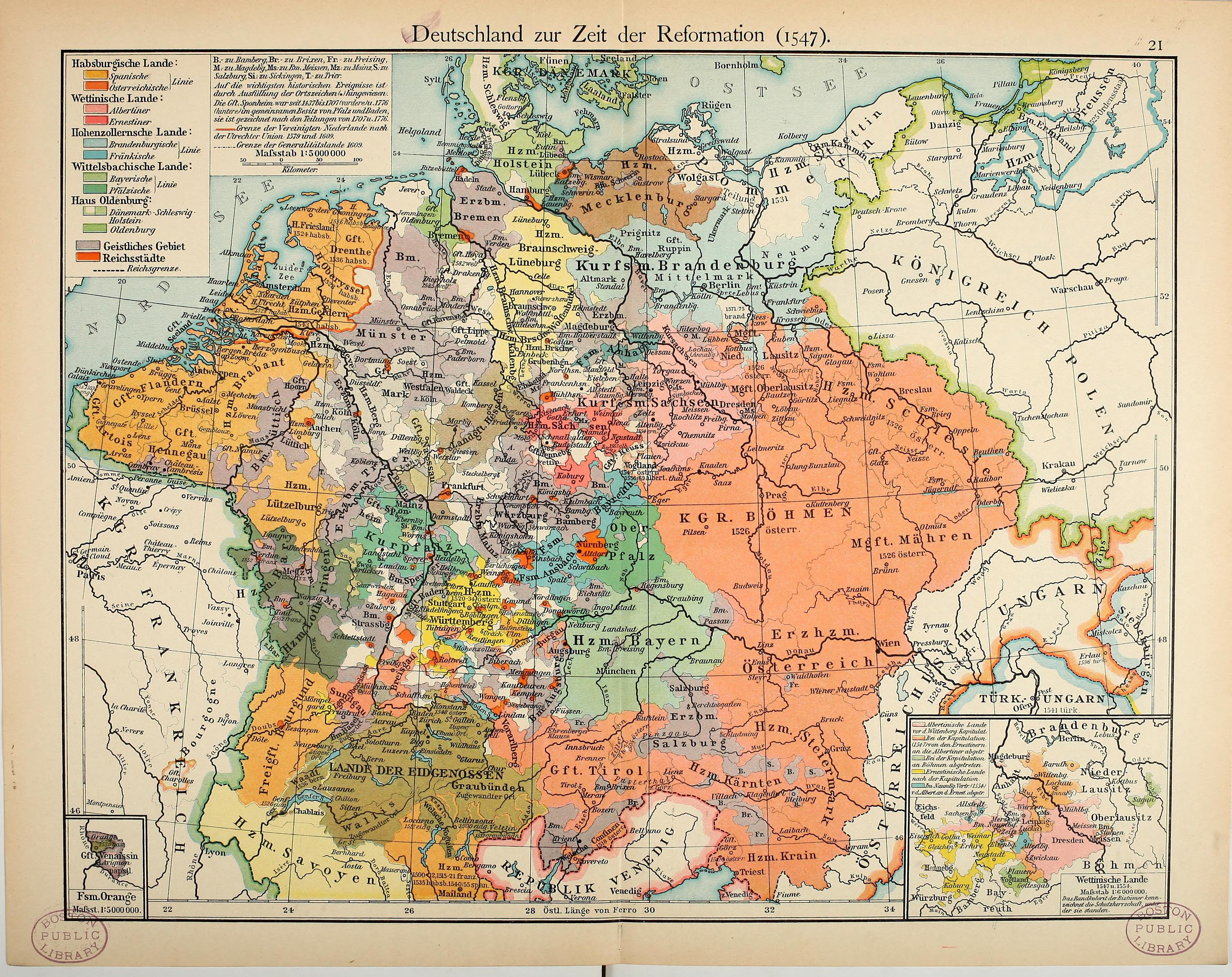
Germany in the 16th century

The Second Margrave War (German: Zweiter Markgrafenkrieg) was a conflict in the Holy Roman Empire between 1552 and 1555. Instigated by Albert Alcibiades, Margrave of Brandenburg-Kulmbach and Brandenburg-Bayreuth, who was attempting to form a Duchy of Franconia under his rule, the war resulted in widespread devastation in Franconia, while also affecting the Rhineland and Lower Saxony.

== Origins ==
The First Margrave War, which Albrecht III Achilles, Elector of Brandenburg had waged primarily against his neighbors, including the Imperial City of Nuremberg, was not directly related to the Second Margrave War. What the two wars had in common was the Margraves' attempt to expand their influence in Franconia and assert claims against their regional competitor, Nuremberg.

As Albert's Protestant faith legitimized his lucrative plunder of Brandenburg-Kulmbach's Catholic neighbors, the war can generally be seen as an outgrowth of the Second Schmalkaldic War.

== War ==
Albert's first targets were Brandenburg-Kulmbach's immediate neighbors, starting with the Imperial City of Nuremberg. An initial siege attempt was unsuccessful, so Brandenburg-Kulmbach forces relentlessly raided Nuremberg's hinterland, in the process capturing Forchheim and its fortress. Nuremberg finally surrendered to Brandenburg-Kulmbach on 19 June 1552. Brandenburg-Kulmbach was also able to capture the Imperial City of Schweinfurt, which would become an important base for further conquests. Albert entered extortive treaties with the Prince-Bishoprics of Würzburg and Bamberg, requiring them to make him large payments and surrender land to avoid conquest. Eventually, he conquered Bamberg outright. These treaties were not recognized by Emperor Charles V, who placed Albert under an Imperial ban. However, since Charles was partially reliant on Albert's troops at his Siege of Metz, the ban was reversed, and Charles tacitly allowed Albert to carry on.

In the summer of 1552, Albert marched into the Rhineland in an attempt to join his armies with those of the Kingdom of France against the Emperor. Albert started conflicts with the Electorates of Mainz and Trier along the way, also feuding with Speyer, Worms, Oppenheim, Verdun, and Frankfurt, among others. He demanded 150,000 Gulden from the Prince-Bishopric of Speyer, when it did not oblige, he destroyed the castles of Madenburg and Hambach. The ruins of Hambach Castle would later become an early symbol of the German nationalist and democratic movement. The Peace of Passau, which provided a conclusion to the Second Schmalkaldic war in August 1553, failed to validate Albert's territorial ambitions, motivating him to continue fighting.

Albert's destructive path through the Holy Roman Empire made him the enemy of many Princes, who eventually formed several leagues against him. Brandenburg-Kulmbach's immediate neighbors formed a Franconian League, while his opponents in other areas formed a Heidelberg League which quickly allied itself with the Franconian one. With Brandenburg-Kulmbach's troops caught up in Lower Saxony, where Albert was levying troops, armies from Nuremberg, Würzburg and Bamberg reconquered castles and land that had been seized by Albert earlier in Franconia, while the armies of Brunswick and Saxony made their way to Schweinfurt.

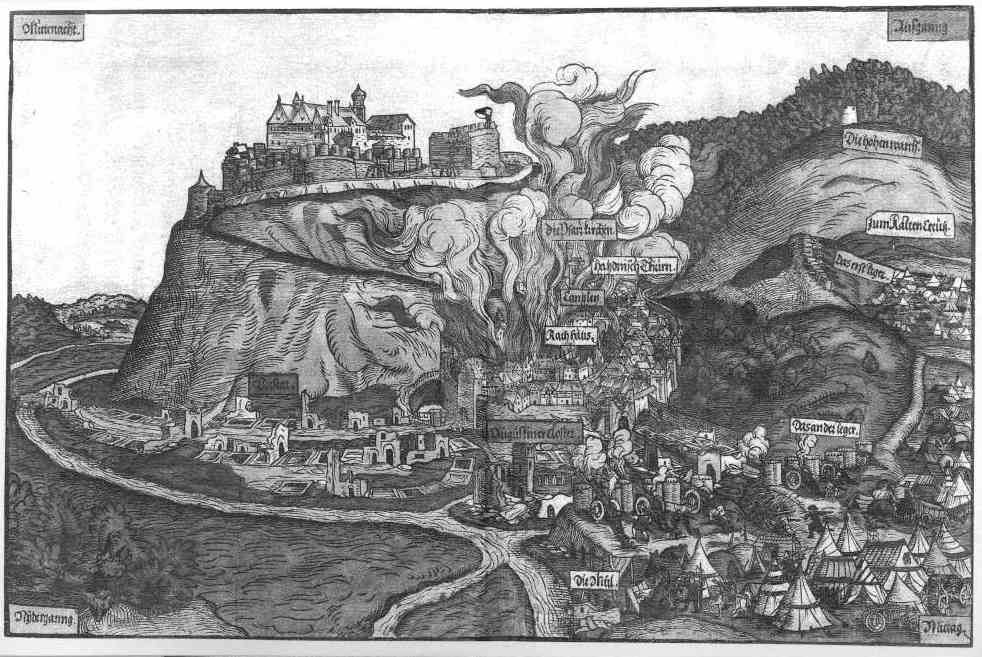
A contemporary depiction of the Sack of Kulmbach and siege of the Plassenburg

On 9 July 1553 the allied troops of Elector Maurice of Saxony and Duke Henry V of Brunswick-Wolfenbüttel engaged Albert's troops at the massive Battle of Sievershausen. Brunswick and Saxony won a decisive victory, but at the cost of thousands of lives: Maurice himself was killed in the battle, while Henry lost both of his sons. With 12,000 casualties, the battle was one of the bloodiest to have been fought on Lower Saxon territory.

With his levied army mostly defeated, the path to Brandenburg-Kulmbach lay open for invasion. Troops from Brunswick, Bohemia, Bamberg, Nuremberg, and other parts of the Empire streamed into the Franconian heartland. Hof and Bayreuth were put to the flame, while countless castles and towns in Albert's domain were destroyed. On St. Conrad's Day, 26 November 1553, Albert's residence of Kulmbach was sacked and destroyed, with many civilians being massacred or fleeing the town. The Plassenburg closed its gates to the fleeing civilians and remained unconquered for almost another year, until July 1554. As the tide of the war decisively turned against Albert, the Imperial Ban against him was reinstated. Albert attempted to save his home and marched his troops into Franconia once more, but was again defeated in battle at Schwarzach, after which he was forced to surrender the Plassenburg, which was slighted.

Albert initially fled to France, then finding refuge with the family of his sister Kunigunde, whose husband was Charles II, Margrave of Baden-Durlach. He died in Pforzheim a few years later, on 8 January 1557. His possessions underwent imperial sequestration under the administration of the Bohemian chancellor Count von Schlick, and after Albert's death they passed to his cousin, George Frederick, Margrave of Brandenburg-Ansbach, who oversaw a rebirth of the war-weary territories.

== See also ==
- First Margrave War
