= Patriciate (Nuremberg) =

Medieval Nuremberg Government

The Patriciate of the Imperial City of Nuremberg, the families entitled to the Inner Council, represented the actual center of power in Nuremberg until the French occupation in 1806.

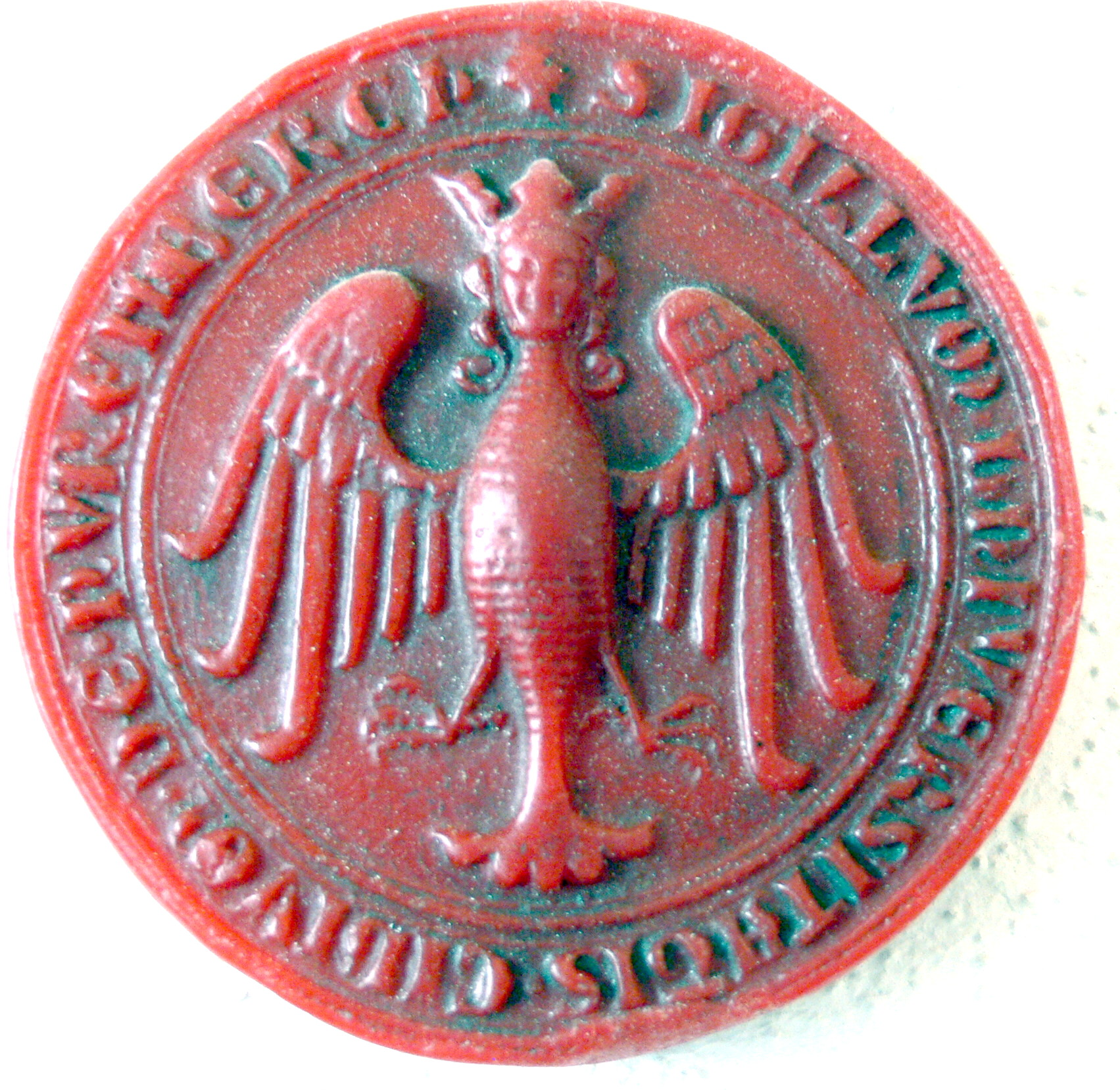
Ältestes Nürnberger Stadtsiegel mit Königskopfadler, um 1200

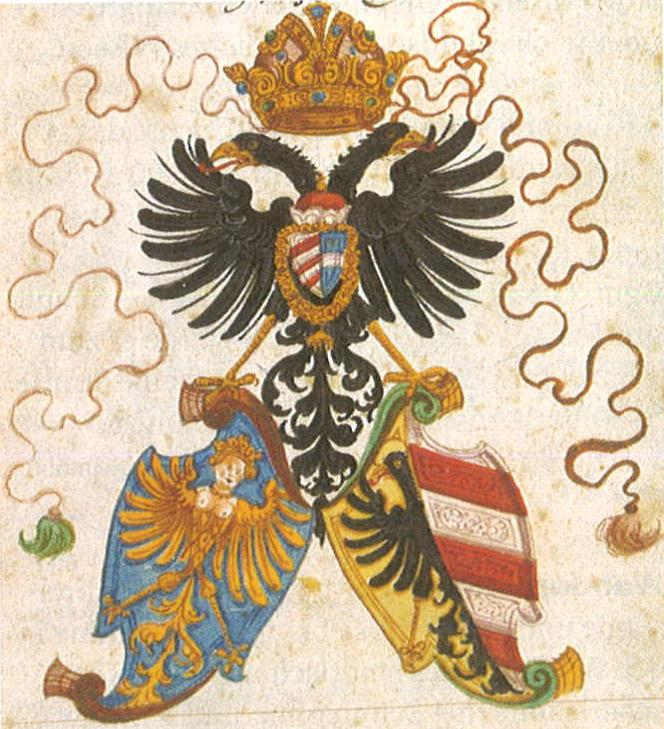
The three-pass coat of arms of the Nuremberg city arms, around 1700: double-headed imperial eagle and both Nuremberg city arms, large coat of arms with king-head eagle, transformed into a virgin eagle from the middle of the 15th century, and small coat of arms with a split shield, in front in gold the half black imperial eagle and in the back with the Field divided diagonally by red and silver five times.

Patricians had also emerged in other German imperial cities as well as in upper Italian cities since the 11th century from former local nobility or local ministeriality. They called themselves " Geschlechter", only later the term patricius appears in Latin documents. From about the middle of the 14th century, economic activities, long-distance trade, mining enterprises and financial transactions of the Nuremberg patricians caused the city and country nobility to increasingly distance themselves from each other. Nevertheless, the Nuremberg dynasties remained capable of holding feuds and bore knightly coats of arms.

From 1256 until the French occupation and subsequent annexation by the Kingdom of Bavaria on September 15, 1806, Nuremberg was governed by the Council, although until 1427 many powers in the city and surrounding area were still held by the Burgraves of Nuremberg, who were appointed from 1105. After the purchase of the burgrave's office in 1427, the council held sole rule in the city and the immediate surrounding area.

The Council was divided into the Inner Council and the Great Council. The Inner Council represented the actual center of power and the holder of sovereignty. In addition to only eight representatives of the trades, only the "councilable" families were represented in it, thus forming the patriciate of the city. The imperial city of Nuremberg itself - like other free and imperial cities or the Italian city-states - referred to itself as a "republic" (res publica). In addition to the reference to the Roman model, the term here also signifies the contrast to the otherwise customary monarchical forms of government. "Republic" must not be equated with "democracy," however. As a bourgeois republic with an aristocratic constitutional order (also referred to by historians as an "aristocratic republic"), however, Nuremberg did not possess feudal rule based on the feudal system, despite such state organization, but formed an early modern civil society .

== History ==
=== Origin ===
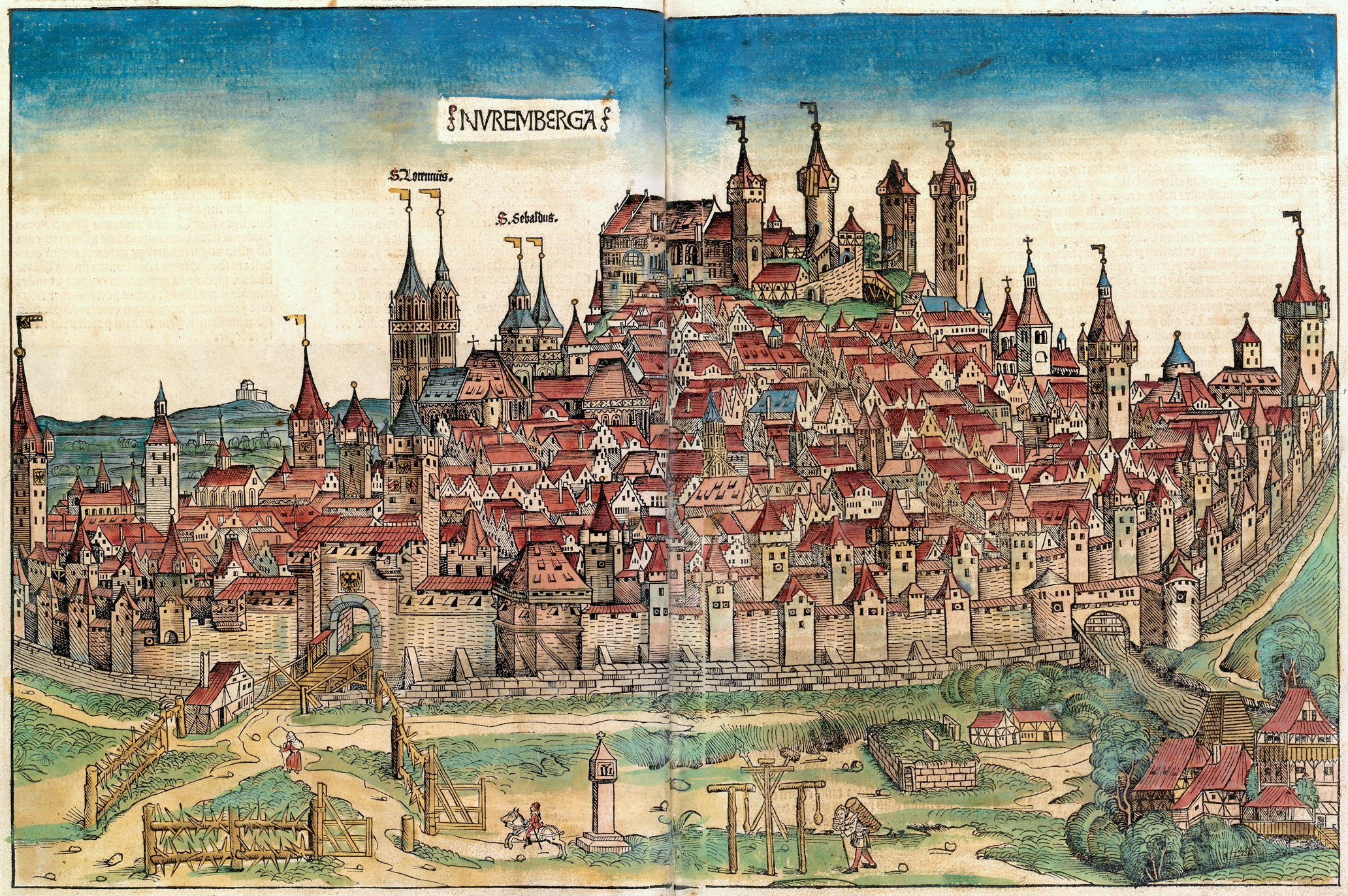
View of the city of Nuremberg from 1493

The families entitled to the council, who - albeit only since the Renaissance - also called themselves patricians after the Roman model, were the politically, economically, and socially leading families of the imperial city. Most of them came from the unfree ministry. After the fall of the Hohenstaufen Empire around 1250, families of the imperial ministers from the surrounding area, such as the Pfinzing, Stromer, Haller, Muffel or Groß from the imperial estate (Terra Imperii) they had previously managed, moved into the city, while the former governors of the Hohenstaufen emperors, the burgraves of Nuremberg from the House of Hohenzollern, appropriated large territories in the area around Nuremberg. However, tensions soon arose between the Council of the Free Imperial City and the Burgraves, who moved their residence from the Nuremberg Burgrave Castle to the Cadolzburg as early as 1260. After the Burggrafenburg was destroyed by Duke Ludwig VII of Bavaria-Ingolstadt in 1420, the Hohenzollern sold the castle, the surrounding area, and the burgrave office to the city council in 1427, thus finally leaving Nuremberg. From then on, the city was made directly imperial by the Inner Council, which was recruited from the patrician families ruled. The two margraviates Brandenburg-Ansbach and Brandenburg-Kulmbach were formed from the territories of the Hohenzollern. In the First and Second Margrave Wars, they then tried in vain to regain their influence over the wealthy imperial city.

=== Council rule ===
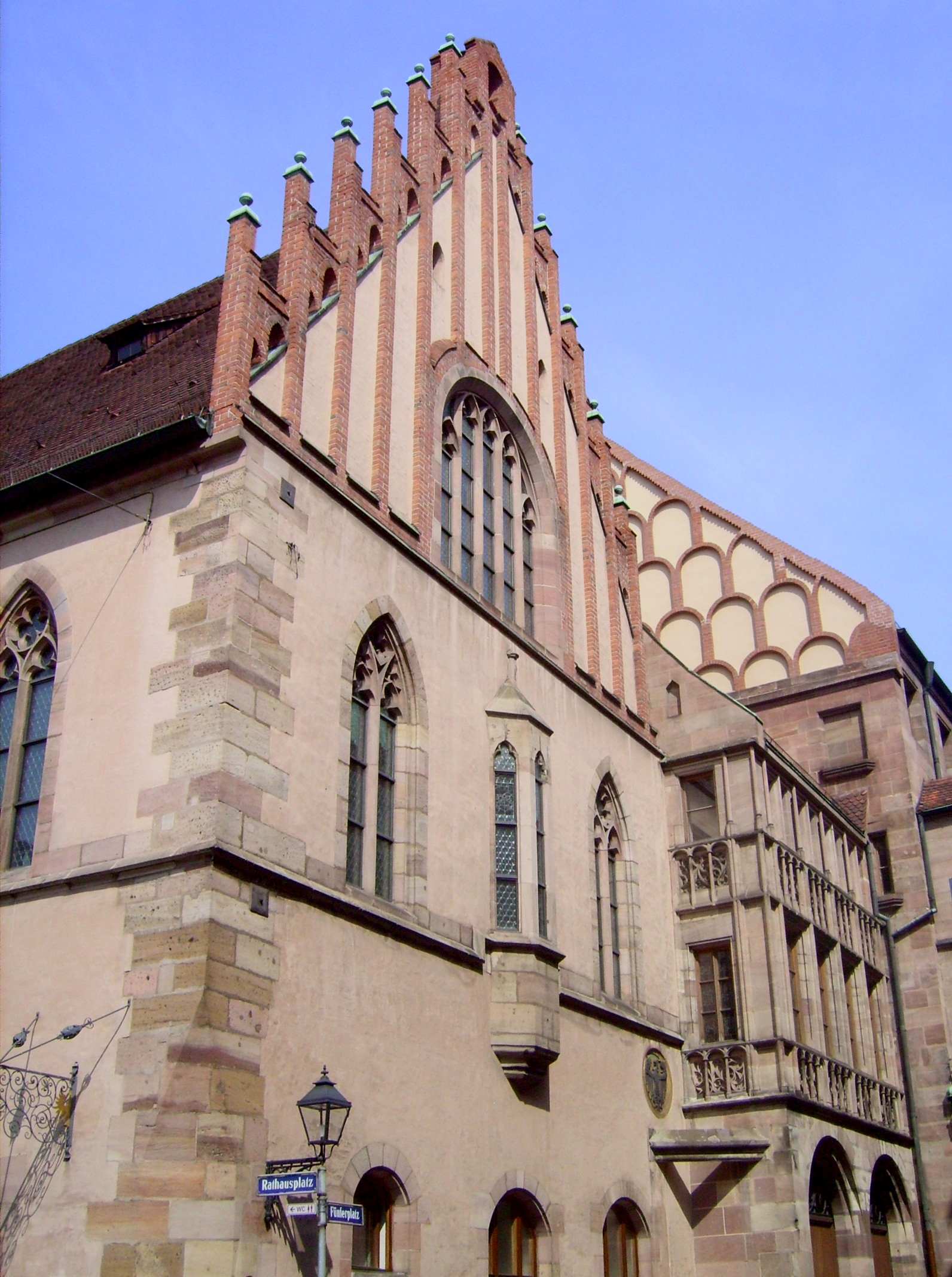
Old Town Hall, Gothic hall by the city architect Philipp Groß (from 1332)

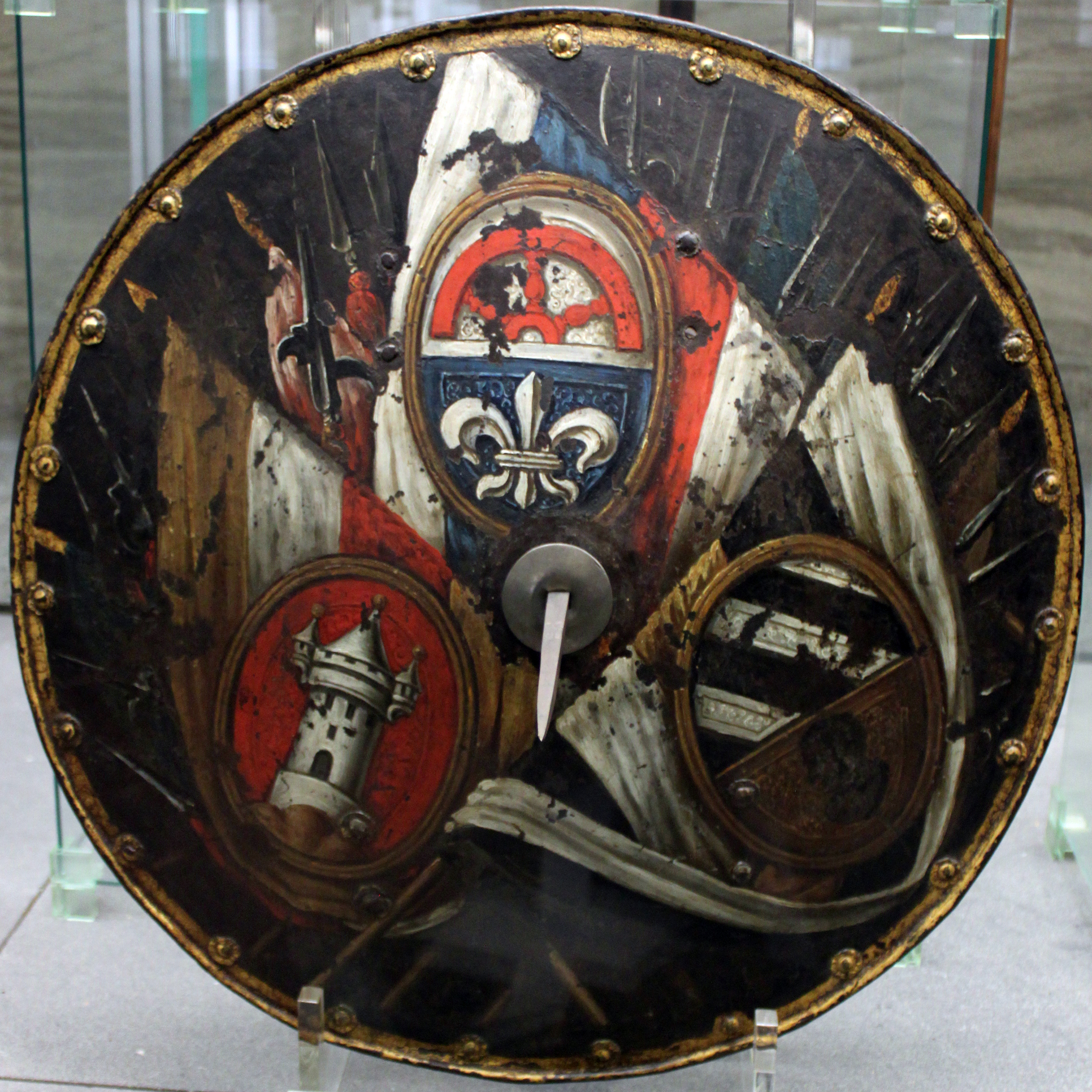
Coat of arms of the three captains (1590): Volckamer, Harsdorf and Tucher

The council, first mentioned in 1256, formed the first rules around 1285, which were codified as customary law around the year 1320. The merchant families who had become rich through their trade were represented in the city council and initially appeared as "families". The number of members and eligible families changed over the centuries. In later times, in particular, some craftsmen's guilds had a certain say in the matter, but never (unlike in cities under Magdeburg or Luebian law, for example ) became part of the circle of actual councilors. In contrast to the Cologne Richerzeche, for example, the guild of rich patricians, which was disempowered by the craftsmen's guilds as early as 1396, the Nuremberg city-state remained the prime example of a patrician city-republic until the end of the Holy Roman Empire in 1806. Similar to the Republic of Venice, this was under the oligarchical rule of a closed circle of patrician families and, like there, the constitution was determined by a finely tuned balance of power between the influential "lines" and the individual government organs (see: Constitution of the Republic of Venice ). The principle of the careful balancing of power and mutual control of the various bodies was always observed.

No family was allowed to have more than two members in the council (senators), membership was mostly lifelong, but the councilors were formally re-elected every year in May, later on, the first Tuesday after Easter. The election process was complicated, but the result was always voted on beforehand. Two consuls presided over the council, called "elder" and "junior mayors"; unlike the ancient Roman consulate, these rotated not annually, but monthly and were purely honorary positions. The senior mayor, however, was the formal head of the city (duumvir primarius) and appeared as such on imperial visits, for example. The "older mayors" again became a Septemvirale elected, seven people who formed the actual government of the city and were also called the College of Elderly Men. From their midst, the three captains were appointed: the “Foremost Losunger ” (the highest public office in the imperial city that had control over the finances) and his deputy, the younger Losunger. They were entrusted with the city treasury and the maintenance of the seals and letters of freedom. They were no longer allowed to trade or trade. The third was the "captain" to which the war and construction industries were subordinate. If the foremost Losunger died, the younger Losunger followed him and the captain became the younger Losunger. The more ceremonial office of the " Reichsschultheiss " represented the emperor in the city and formed the top of the judiciary. Other honorary posts were the “Crown Guardian and Custodian of Imperial Regalia ” and the “Caretaker of the Twelve Brothers House Foundations ”.

Since the beginning of the 14th century, the “Council of the Named” (or “Great Council”) was added to the actual “Council”. This included the gentlemen "named" (ie appointed) by the councilors, mostly influential representatives of the craft guilds or traders. The council of the named met only when the "Inner Council" was convened. The "named" were not considered to be "Ratsfähig" (for the "Inner Council"), so they were not considered part of the (patrician) city regiment. However, around the patrician families, there was another circle of respected trading families who were referred to as "Erbare". Their relatives were “capable of judging”, so they could preside over a court under the authority of the Council. The patrician families “Ratsfähig” also entered into marriages with the “heritable” families, and later some families from their circle were accepted into the “inner council” and thus into the patriciate as successors for extinct generations.

The city temporarily had up to eleven administrative offices in the surrounding area, through which it administered its immediate imperial territory. Mostly patricians officiated as carers at the nursing castles. They were subordinate to one of the Septemviri, who was appointed "Prefect of the Provinces". In addition, around 40 families and a number of council institutions, including above all the Heilig-Geist-Spital and, after the Reformation, the “Nuremberg Landalmosen”, owned extensive manors and subjects subject to tax in the Nuremberg area.

=== City Adel ===
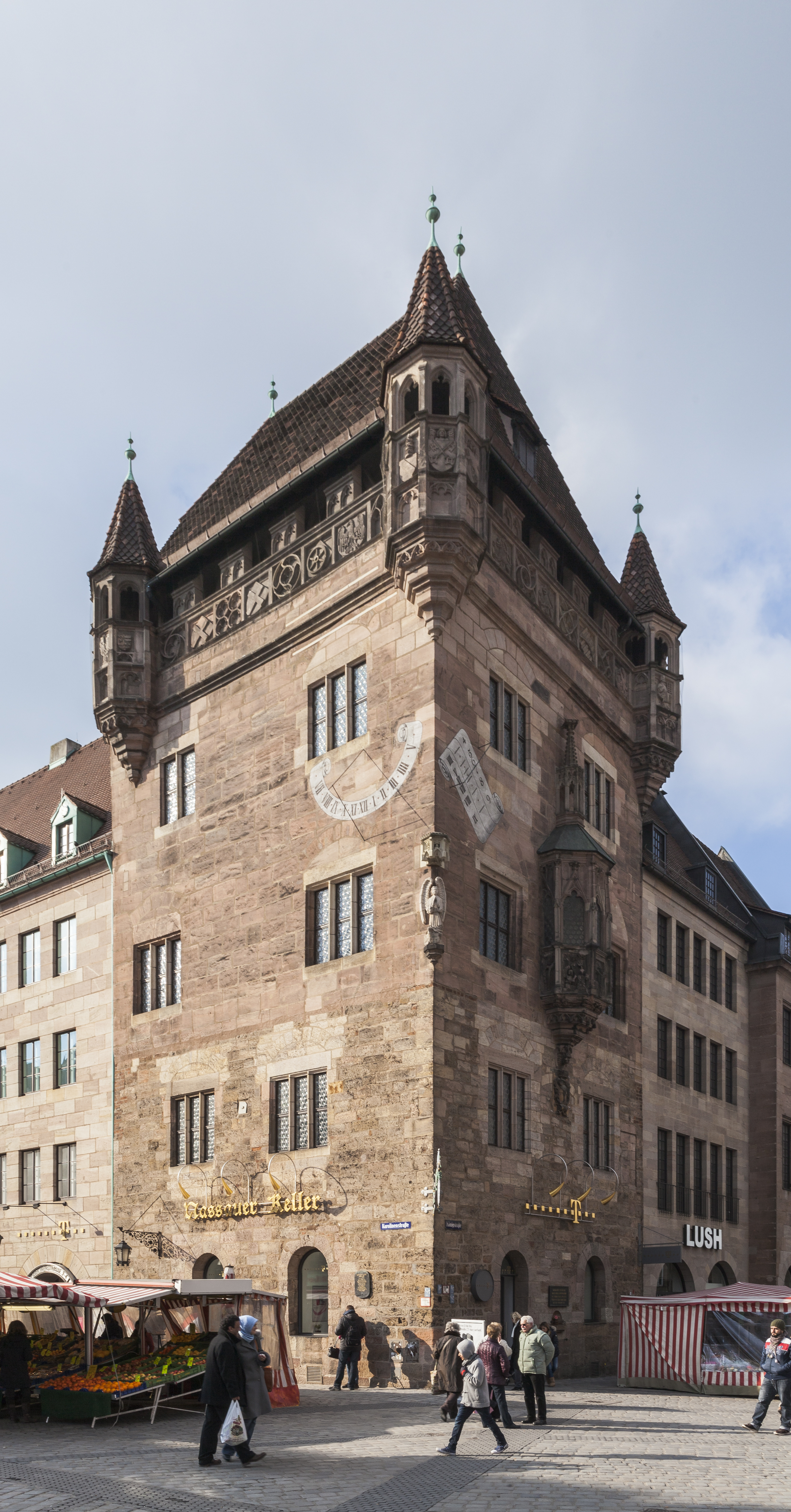
Nassauer Haus, the last tower house in Nuremberg

In the beginning, there were no big differences between the landed gentry and the city gentry. So the oldest families still built residential towers in the city, as the ministerials did in the country. Of the 65 “ dynasty towers ” that existed in Nuremberg around 1430, only the Nassau house is still preserved today, unlike in Regensburg, for example, where there are even more examples. But since about the middle of the 14th century, the paths diverged. As a rule, the new city nobility achieved great wealth through trade, especially with spices and cloths, with trade connections reaching as far as Cologne and Flanders, Lyon, Bologna, and Venice, also to Bohemia, Austria, and Hungary, furthermore through profitable investments in mining, especially in the Upper Palatinate, Thuringia, and Tyrol, as well as through financial transactions. The wealth of the patriciate gradually enabled him to found an urban aristocracy. Patricians were merchants, but they devoted themselves - in contrast to those who sold "by yard, pound and lot " - exclusively to wholesale and long-distance trade.

The land-based noble families of the Franconian knight circle, who lived on the rather modest taxes from their manors, provided they did not hold lucrative court offices or military positions, often took credit from the rich Nuremberg patricians. In return, however, they denied their equality and thus also their ability to become a pen and tournament, since in their eyes the merchants no longer led a knightly way of life and therefore, regardless of their sometimes aristocratic origins, would have "forfeited" their class affiliation. From their proud castles, they looked half arrogantly, half disapprovingly at the “pepper sacks“ who worked in their trading posts within the city walls. These in turn fought - in league with other cities and the princes - the emerging robber barons of the impoverished landed gentry, such as the Schnapphahn Thomas von Absberg, who had several Nuremberg merchants on his conscience, in the Franconian War of 1523.

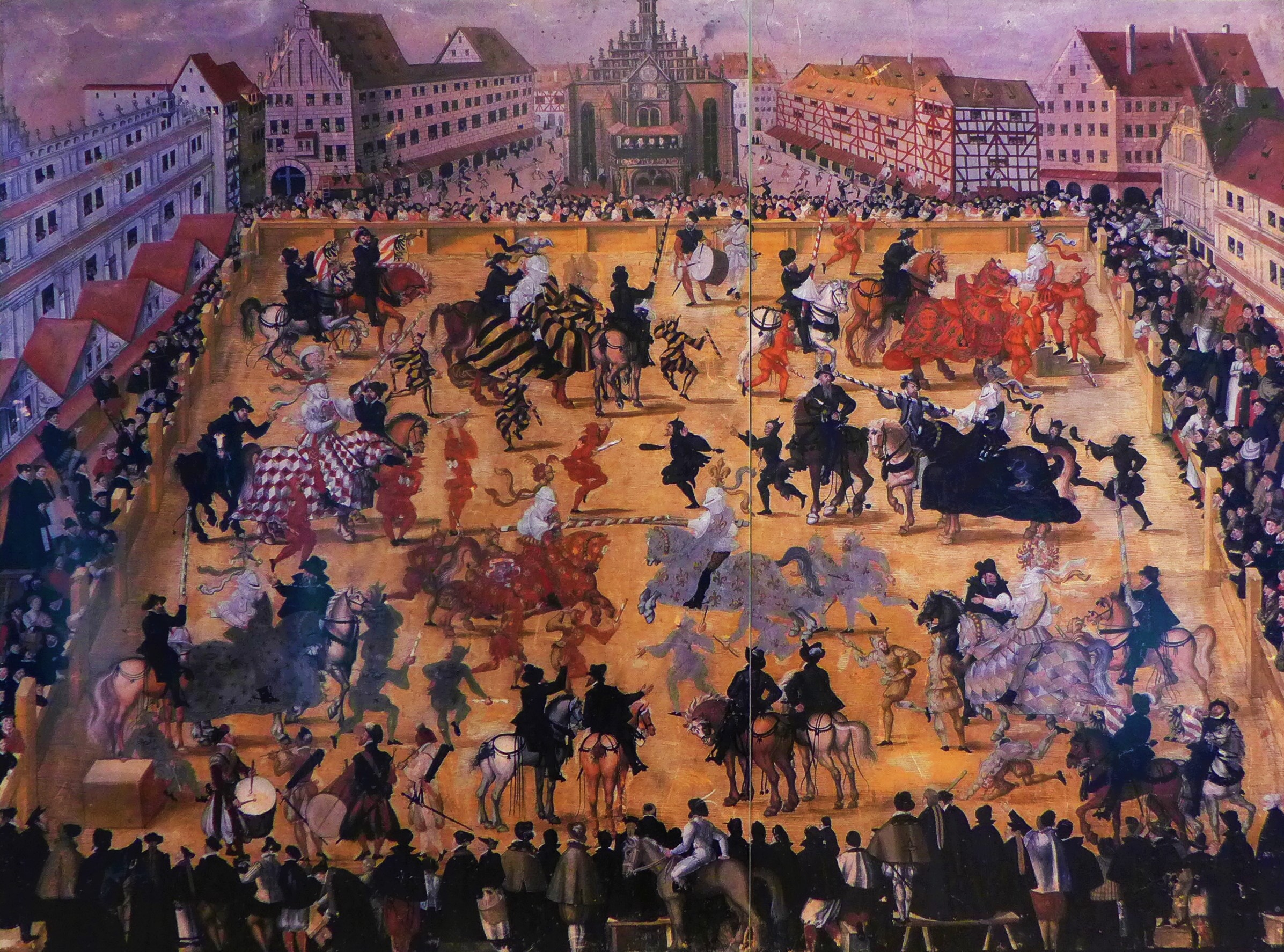
1561: Journeyman piercing of the patrician sons on the " Great Market " in front of the Frauenkirche

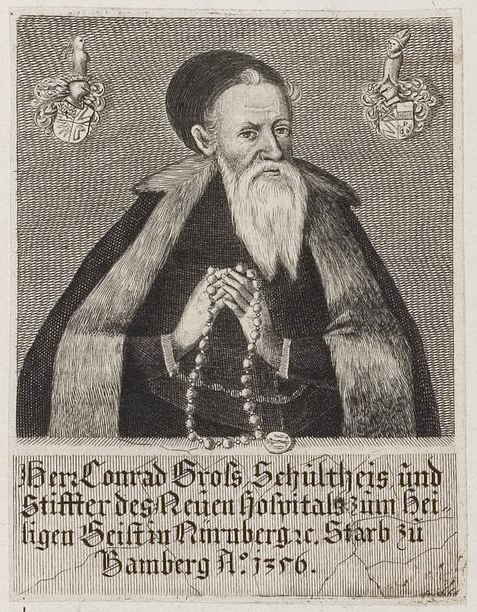
Konrad Groß (around 1280–1356), patrician and founder

Since the aristocracy did not allow the patricians to attend the aristocratic tournaments, the patricians' sons regularly and almost demonstratively carried out so-called " journeyman's stings ", festive knightly lance stings on the large market (today the main market) to underline their rank, for the last time in the year 1561. The patriciate also began to found their own monasteries, which served them to care for younger children and as burial places, for example, the Carmelite monastery in 1287 by the Peßler family, in 1295 the Dominican monastery (Katharinenkloster) by the Neumarkter and Pfinzing, 1380 the Carthusian monastery from the merchant Marquard Mendel and in 1412 the Terziarinnenspital from the Poor Clare Abbess Katharina Pfinzing. In 1343, the patrician Konrad Groß participated in the founding of the Cistercian monastery Himmelthron in Großgründlach and in 1345 also founded the monastery Pillenreuth for the Augustinian choir women. He had already founded the Heilig-Geist-Spital in Nuremberg in 1331. The last founding of the monastery was in 1422 when the Gnadenberg Monastery was donated to the Order of the Birgit in the Upper Palatinate. Although it was not in Nuremberg's sphere of influence, it was donated by the Count Palatine von Neumarkt, albeit with the strong support of the Nuremberg patricians, especially the princes, and the city held the patronage of the monastery until the Reformation.

Many patrician families had the emperor individually confirm their nobility quality through imperial nobility or coat of arms letters, often combined with improvements in a coat of arms and crowns, often against payment. To demonstrate that they felt noble, other families added an addition to their original family name with “von” and the name of a country estate they had bought. In many cases, they later succeeded in having this arbitrary addition confirmed by the emperor as a title of nobility.

The marriage rules were restrictive, people mostly kept to themselves, although Elsbeth Tucher, for example, portrayed by Dürer, came from a rather modest background. Connubium with the landed gentry took place rather seldom, not only because of the class reservations of the knight families but also because their possessions were fief-bound and they, therefore, could not offer the merchants any increase in their wealth. The knights also seldom had cash and never had useful trading contacts. Nonetheless, there were connections that brought the patricians at least prestige, for example, the mother of the famous founder Konrad Groß (from the wealthy council family Groß) was born from Vestenberg.

=== Cooptation ===
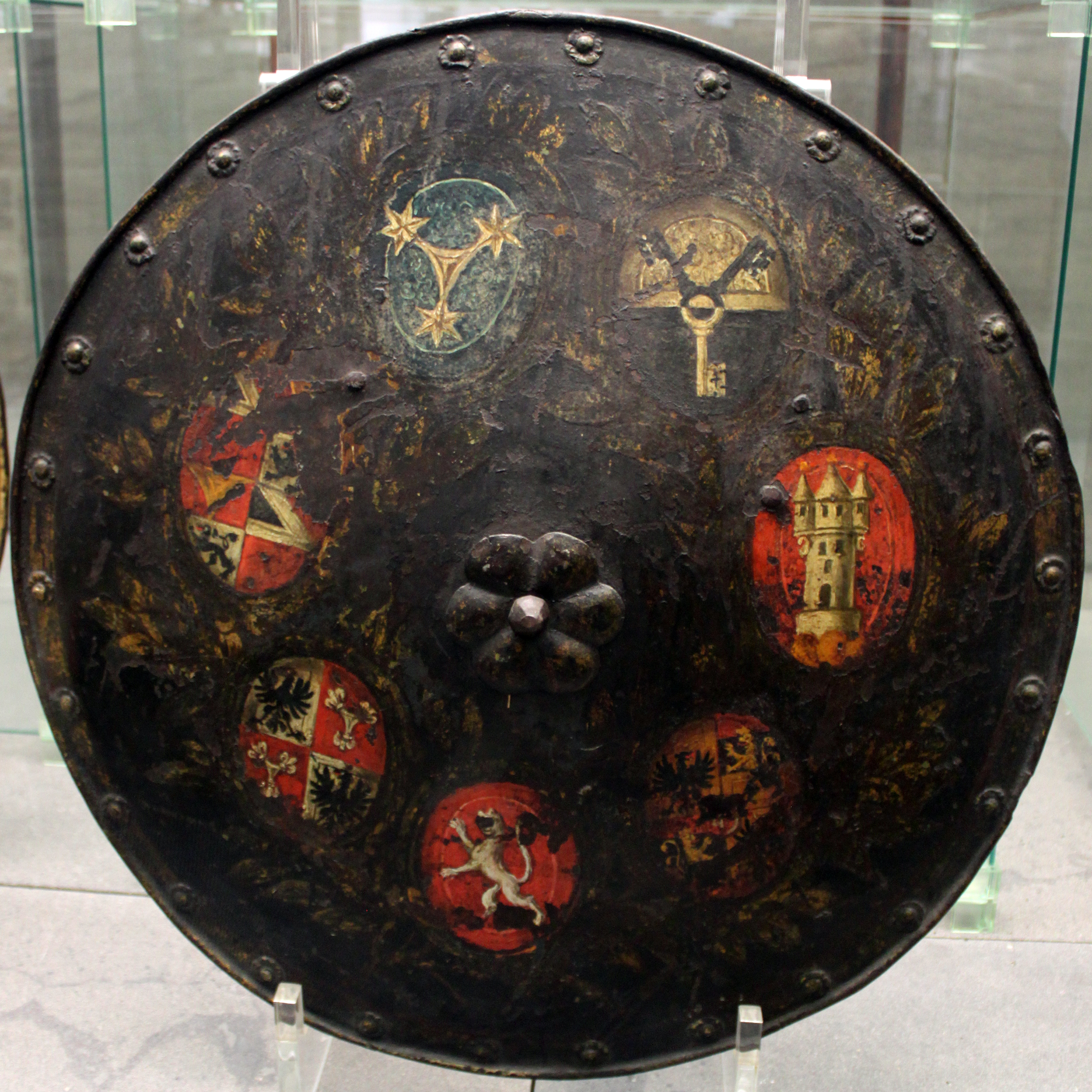
Round shield with the coats of arms of the seven elderly gentlemen, 1590. Clockwise from above: Geuder, Schlüsselfelder, Harsdorf ,?, Tetzel, Nützel, Haller; Germanic National Museum

Due to the extinction of many noble families in the course of the late Middle Ages, the council was forced to supplement its membership by co-opting new "respectable families". Also, some old council families migrated from Nuremberg.

At first, the "respectability" was considered a second class; later, some of their families, distinguished by wealth and marrying into the older patrician families, were also included in the patriciate. In the 15th century, twenty-two new families found their way to the council in this way, including the soon influential Kreß, Rieter and Harsdörffer. Only the Fütterers from the craftsmen's class managed to become members of the Inner Council, after they had achieved considerable wealth through financial transactions and publishing. In many cases, families who had moved from Upper German cities, such as the important Welsers from Augsburg, the Ehingers from Ulm and Memmingen, as well as a number of families from the area around Lauingen in Swabia, were co-opted into the council, including such well-known families as the Imhoffs from 1350 and the Paumgartners from 1396.

The circle of families eligible for the council was finally fixed with the enactment of the Dance Statute of 1521, and the patriciate of forty-two families closed itself off like a caste. After this decree, the principle of the "enjoying family" determined Nuremberg society and politics, because only these forty-two families were eligible for the council. (A similar closure had already taken place in the Republic of Venice, with which they were in trade relations, in 1297, where since then only the Nobilhòmini were admitted to the Grand Council of the Republic. Nevertheless, until the end of the Republic in 1797, the Venetian patrician families almost always remained merchants, unlike the Nurembergers).

From 1536 to 1729, only the key fields were co-opted. Due to the extinction of some families, in the 18th century first six families (1729: Gugel, Oelhafen, Peßler, Scheurl, Thill and Waldstromer) and in 1788 again three (Peller, Praun and Woelckern) had to be granted the "court and council ability", because not all offices and deputations could be filled anymore.

Like the merchant councillors of most other German imperial cities, Nuremberg's patrician families gradually embraced the Protestant faith after the Reformation in 1517, although some were initially hesitant. As early as 1516, Luther's teacher Johann von Staupitz had made an impression on notable citizens through his sermons in Nuremberg. After the Nuremberg Religious Discussion of March 3–14, 1525, convened by the Council and led by Council Counsel Christoph Scheurl, Nuremberg officially turned to Lutheran teachings in several Council resolutions. On April 21, 1525, the council banned Catholic masses.

=== Knighthood ===
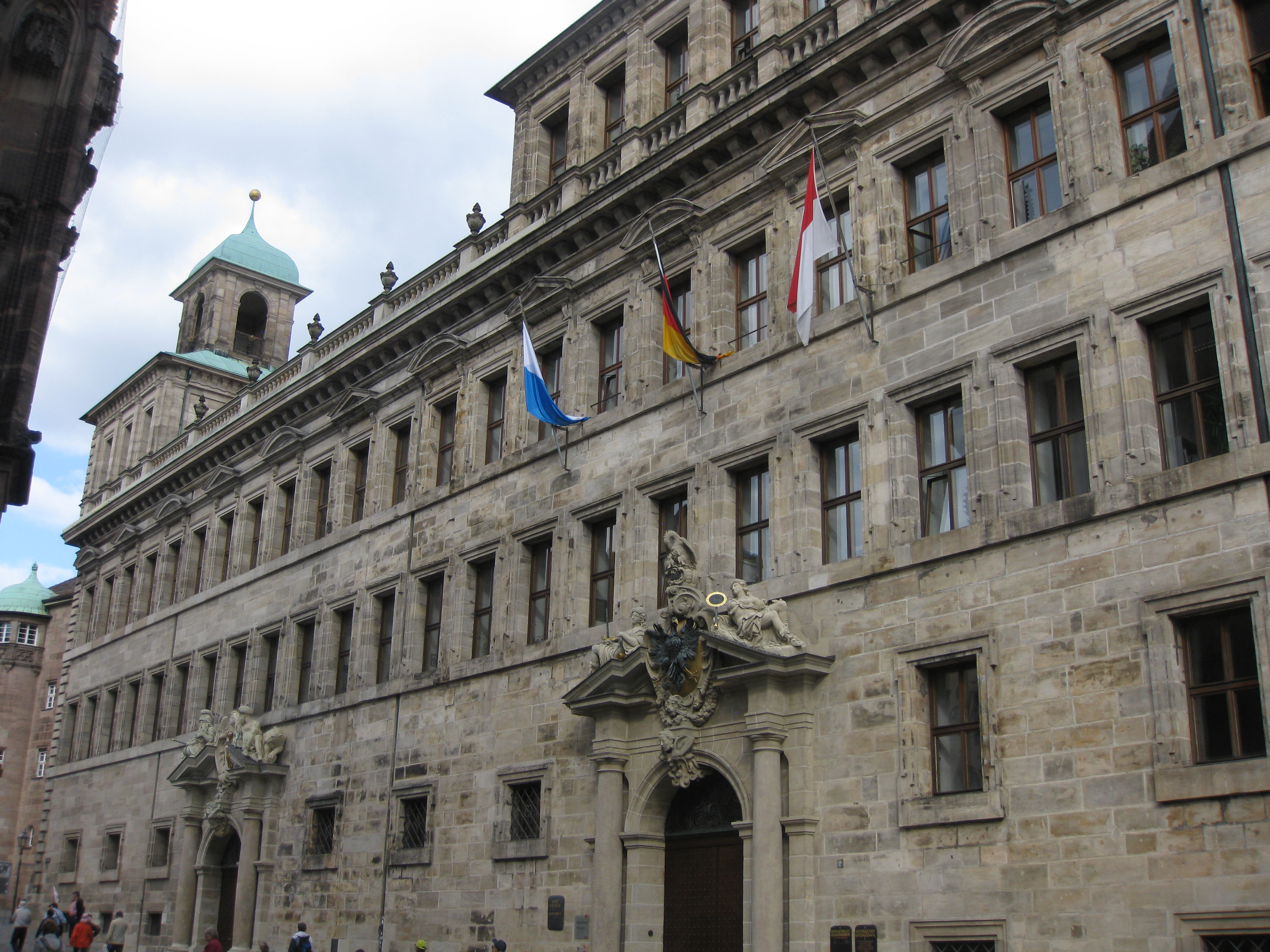
Old Town Hall, four-wing complex designed by the city architect Wolf Jacob Stromer (from 1616)

Although thirty-nine patrician families owned the sovereignty of some 3,000 peasant backstreets in the Nuremberg environs, they were denied equal status by the knightly nobility of the Franconian Knights' Circle, the circle of the imperial knighthood surrounding the city, with the exception of the Rieters of Kornburg.

When the dispute about the equality, titulature and address escalated in 1654, the patriciate turned to the emperor. In the privileges of 1696 and 1697, Emperor Leopold confirmed to the patrician families their old nobility and the right to admit new families. He stated that they had lived in a noble and knightly state for a long time "before going to the city", had been admitted to tournaments, had been knighted and admitted to noble foundations and orders of knighthood, abstained from all commercial (!) and other bourgeois trades, and had been entrusted with the government of a populous city. The council was corporately (as a state) granted the predicate "noble" and the three foremost councilors were given the title "Wirklicher Geheimer Rat des Kaisers" since 1721, whereby they were equal in rank and title to the knight captains of the imperial knighthood.

However, the claims to equality and the title "noble" had yet to be asserted against the imperial knighthood. Several patrician families, such as the Geuder, Kreß, Welser, Tucher, Imhoff and Holzschuher, were able to achieve their matriculation with the imperial knighthood in the Franconian knightly circle by acquiring knightly estates in the following decades. It was only for the Nuremberg patriciate that a council seat in the city and membership in the free imperial knighthood could be combined in one person. However, in order to be able to take office with the knightly canton, patricians had to give up their citizenship, such as Johann Philipp Geuder (1597-1650), who even became director of the imperial knighthood in Franconia, Swabia and on the Rhine. However, the councilable families had undoubtedly attained equal rank and status with the free imperial knighthood in imperial and princely administrative services and in military service. They rose to the highest ranks in the officer corps of the Franconian Imperial Circle and in the imperial army.

Through the Rieter Foundation, the city of Nuremberg itself became a member of the Imperial Knighthood in 1753, after the Rieters of Kornburg had died out, because the Rieters had bequeathed the land and castle lordships of Kornburg, Kalbensteinberg and Untererlbach to the Heilig-Geist-Spital and thus to the city; in this way, the respective foundation administrators also came from the patriciate into the knighthood.

=== Nobiles Norimbergenses ===
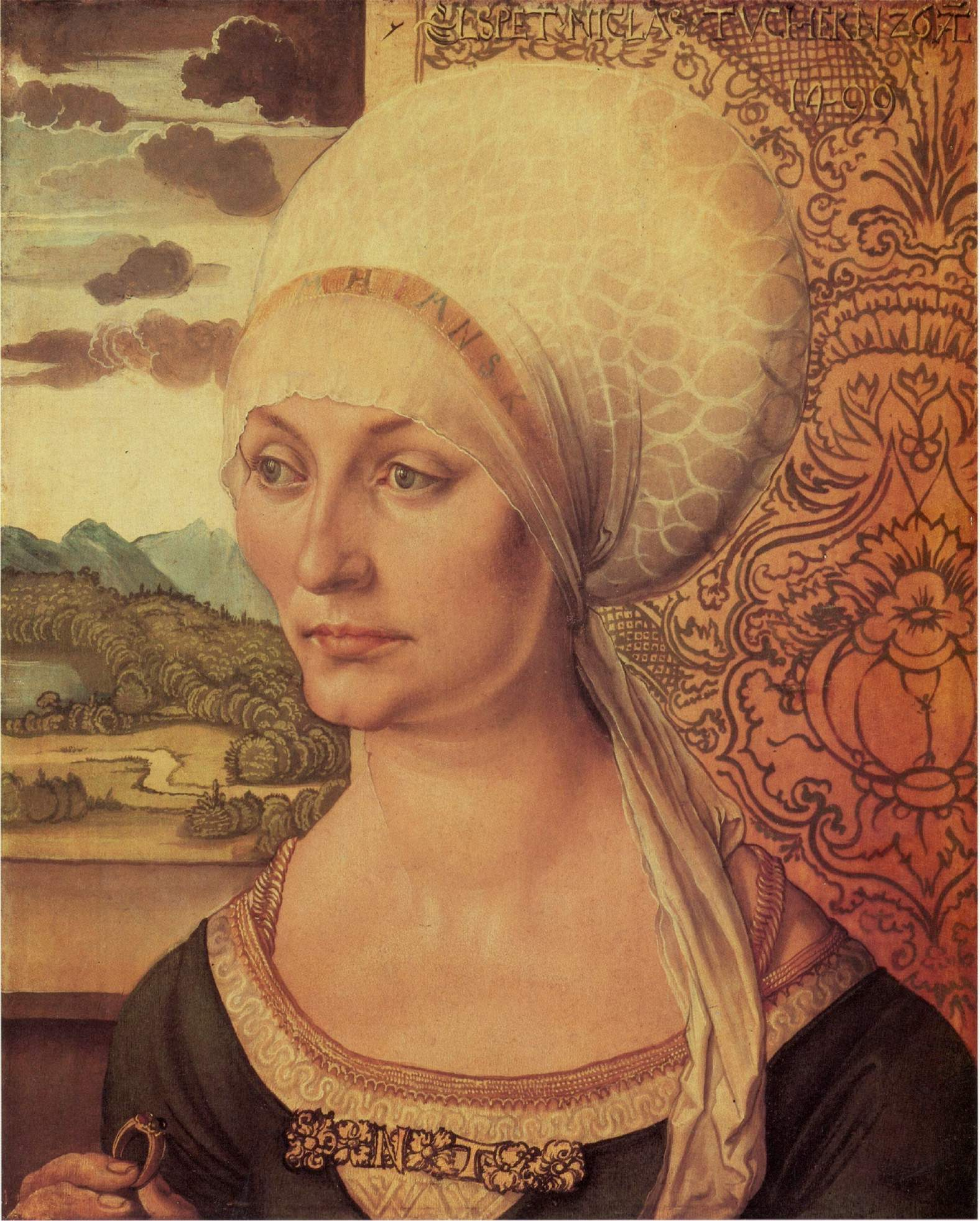
Portrait of Elsbeth Tucher by Albrecht Dürer, 1499

The wealthy patricians, also known as Nobiles Norimbergenses, clearly distinguished themselves as the first class through the dress codes. By the time the Dance Statute was enacted in 1521, Nuremberg had completed the formation of a society hierarchically divided into five estates. The social demarcations were precisely defined by title, clothing and living expenses and were regulated by the authorities, for example in dress codes. A fashion dictate issued by the council regulated the form, quality and decoration of what the representatives of the first estate were to wear in order to maintain the order of the estates.

As the first estate, the oligarchic group of the patriciate had established itself, 42 families that were the only ones "fit for council" (for the Inner Council) and exercised the sole power in the imperial city and its land area. The second estate was formed by the big merchants and the important jurist families, who were represented in the Larger Council and were later also called "respectability". These were often hardly inferior to the patricians in wealth and economic power. The remaining merchants and traders of the Larger Council, as well as the eight craftsmen of the Smaller Council, made up the third estate. The small merchants and craftsmen of the Larger Council belonged to the fourth estate. This included, for example, the craftsman Albrecht Dürer (1471-1528). All other citizens of the city formed the fifth estate. Of Nuremberg's population of about 50,000 in the 16th century, only about 400-450 people belonged to the first to fourth estates.

However, the estates located below the patriciate contributed not insignificantly to the wealth of the city. The years around the turn of the century between 1470 and 1530 are considered the Golden Age. The city traded with almost all parts of the then known world, its merchants maintained trading posts in many cities. The saying went around: "Nuremberg trumpery goes through all the land". The city was also called "the treasure chest of the empire". Highly artistic craftsmen such as Dürer, Veit Stoß and Adam Kraft created great works, and the technical inventiveness became known as Nuremberg wit. Patricians such as the councilors and humanists Willibald Pirckheimer, Hieronymus Holzschuher, the traveling cloth merchant and globe inventor Martin Behaim, the governor and technical draftsman Martin Löffelholz von Kolberg († 1533) or the governor and cartographer Paul Pfinzing also participated in these developments. The revenues of the city at that time are said to have been greater than those of the entire Kingdom of Bohemia .

In the course of the 17th century, the patricians withdrew more and more from trading, acquired extensive estates, and demonstratively cultivated the aristocratic lifestyle like the imperial knights on their lavishly furnished mansions in the area around the imperial city and cultivated the knighthood of the surrounding principalities. Her sons took on the foreign court and military services, others turned to the Frankish imperial knighthood, giving up their civil rights after they had acquired manors with a corresponding status. After all, 39 patrician families owned around 3,000 rural backseats in the Nuremberg region in the 17th century. They left the commercial activities to the lower classes. Above all, however, they neglected the economic interests of the city entrusted to them and, with their ostentatiousness, contributed significantly to the ever-increasing debt of Nuremberg.

Towards the end of the 16th century, the previous trade flows from the Levant, via Italy and the Alps to the southern German imperial cities, had shifted to the north. A few generations after the Nurembergers, the patricians of the Dutch port cities now experienced their Golden Age. Also, the precious metals from America led to a monetary and sales crisis. Spain, France and the Netherlands declared national bankruptcy several times in the course of their wars among themselves. The Welsers sold their Nuremberg branch in 1610 and their Augsburg trading company was insolvent in 1614. The last council dynasties still active in long-distance trade, the Tucher and Imhoff, who were particularly involved in the import of saffron, and the Pfinzing, also finally withdrew to their country estates. However, when individual families were no longer able to maintain the patrician level and moved professionally and maritally into the lower estates, as the Schürstabs did in the 17th century, they were expelled from the patriciate.

The Thirty Years' War washed many Protestant exiles from the Habsburg hereditary lands (Austria, Bohemia and Hungary) into the city, among them numerous noble families who had lost their domestic property through sale or expropriation. They sometimes also joined the Nuremberg council families in marriage. Oberbürg Castle in Laufamholz became the social center of the Austrian religious refugees from 1637 under the Khevenhüllers and their heirs, especially Countess Margaretha Susanna von Polheim from 1693 to 1721.

In the following Baroque period, the ruling church princes of the surrounding collegiate residences such as Würzburg, Bamberg and Mainz unfolded enormous splendor with church and palace buildings as well as lavish festivities. The monastic nobility, who earned well in their service, also built a series of magnificent castles. For reasons of prestige, therefore, the Nuremberg patricians also spent the (no longer so plentiful) money with full hands. For the first time these grievances became somewhat known in 1696 by the foremost Losunger Paul Albrecht Rieter von Kornburg. He tried to counteract these mistakes, to reorganize the finances and to reduce the national debt, but did not succeed with the council. In protest, he resigned from office, gave up his citizenship, joined the imperial knighthood and retired to Kornburg.

=== End of the patricians ===
After the end of the imperial city period, the city council was disempowered. On October 28, 1808, the Bavarian king dissolved the previous patrician council and all institutions of the city government, thus ending the imperial city constitution. The economic bourgeoisie, which had been largely excluded from the city government by the patrician rule, sympathized with the new Bavarian rule, from which they expected political participation as well as trade advantages due to the inclusion in the larger Bavarian economic area. The Kingdom of Bavaria recognized the equality of the old patriciate with the Bavarian nobility. Of the twenty-five patrician families still existing at the time of the transfer to Bavaria, the old families - listed in the Dance Statute of 1521 - were enrolled in the baronial class in 1813. The families co-opted only in the course of the 18th century, on the other hand, were admitted only to the class of common nobles.

The Nuremberg patricians had acquired numerous rural estates in the surrounding countryside since the late Middle Ages. Since these estates were usually sold again soon, some families had taken to putting them into family foundations (called "Vorschickung" in Nuremberg), which were usually administered by the family elders and taken over by administrators from related families when the family died out. Bavaria abolished the family foundations in 1808, which led to numerous sales. Later, however, it was possible to continue the remaining foundation estates in the form of entailed estates. These, in turn, were abolished in 1919. Once again, some foundations managed to survive in private law form until today. The deserving citizen, merchant and patron of the arts Paul Wolfgang Merkel (1756-1820), who bought up numerous art treasures from patrician families during the difficult period of the decline of the council rule, also resorted to the surviving institute of the family foundation in order to preserve his estate, which today forms the basis of the Germanic National Museum. There and on such patrician estates, which have always been passed on until today, there are still numerous testimonies of patrician culture, for example in the Nuremberg Tucherschloss and in the Neunhof Castle near Nuremberg (both private museums) and on family estates such as Eschenbach, Diepoltsdorf, Fischbach, Großgründlach, Grünsberg, Haimendorf, Heroldsberg, Kirchensittenbach, Kugelhammer, Lichtenhof, Neunhof/Lauf, Simmelsdorf, Schwarzenbruck and Weiherhaus. The old Nuremberg churches, first and foremost the Sebaldkirche and the Lorenzkirche, are also filled with endowments (altars, windows, statues, paintings, epitaphs and funerary shields) of the council families.

After the transfer to Bavaria, the interests of the patricians were represented by the Selekt des Nürnberger Patriziats (Nuremberg Patricians' Select), founded by them in 1799, a corporative body of estates that still exists today as a private association of the former patrician families. Previously, such a patrician society, as had existed in other cities since the Middle Ages, had not been necessary due to the de facto sole rule of the Nuremberg patricians in the Inner Council. The Selekt was initially concerned with the concerns of the patrician family foundations vis-à-vis an imperial sub-delegation commission that was to review certain reform projects that had been pushed through by the merchants and market leaders since 1785. After the transition to Bavaria, the patricians were concerned with preserving their status, the capital that the patrician families and their foundations had lent to the heavily over-indebted city, their extensive landholdings including their sovereign rights and jurisdiction, as well as preventing any possible disadvantages when new tax rates were introduced. The Selekt also intervened against the provisions of the Bavarian Fideikommissedikt of 1808 and represented the interests of the family foundations (Vorschickungen).

On October 1, 1848, a law came into force that abolished all special rights of former landlords, thus also of the Nuremberg patricians, from imperial times. These included, above all, the right to maintain their own so-called "patrimonial courts," with which the landlords could independently judge their subjects within the framework of the lower court jurisdiction. The previous landlordial ties with the peasants of the surrounding area were dissolved and the peasants were given the opportunity to pay off the land charges with state support, a process that lasted until the inflationary period of the 20th century.

After the end of patrician councillorship, only one representative of the patriciate became First Mayor, Otto Stromer von Reichenbach from 1867 to 1891.

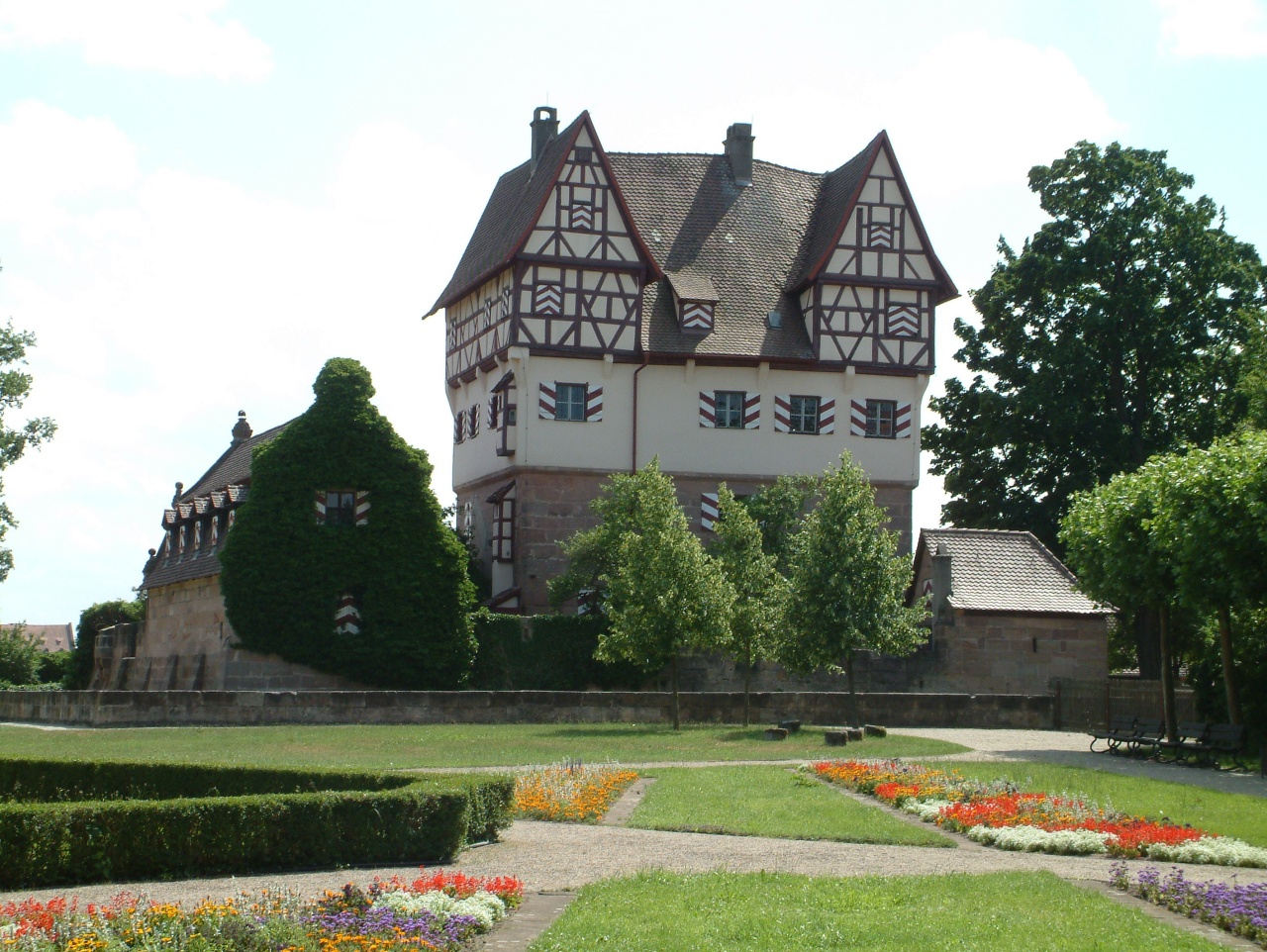
Neunhof Castle, a patrician country seat from the time around 1500

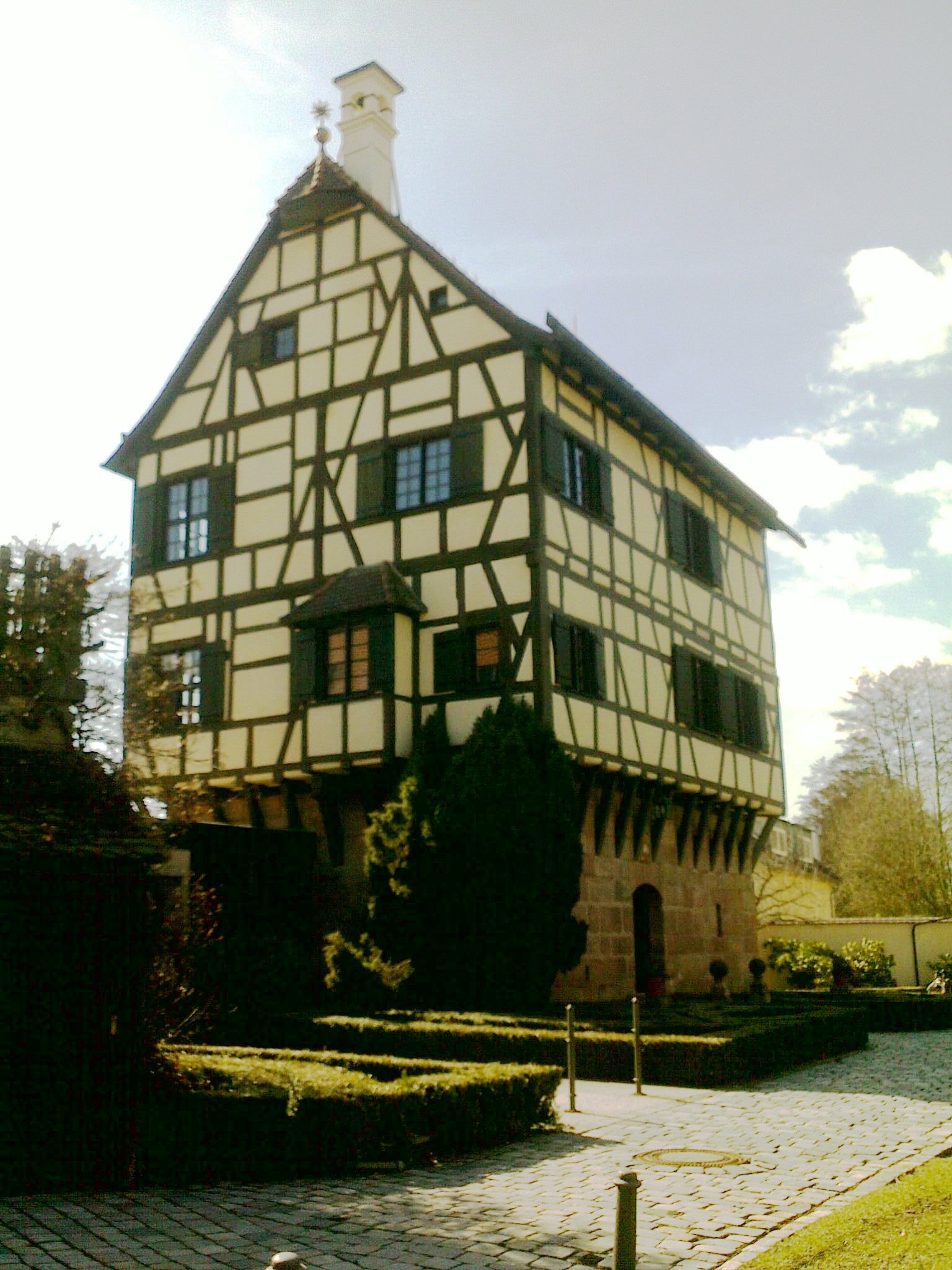
Pellerschloss, a pond house from the 16th century

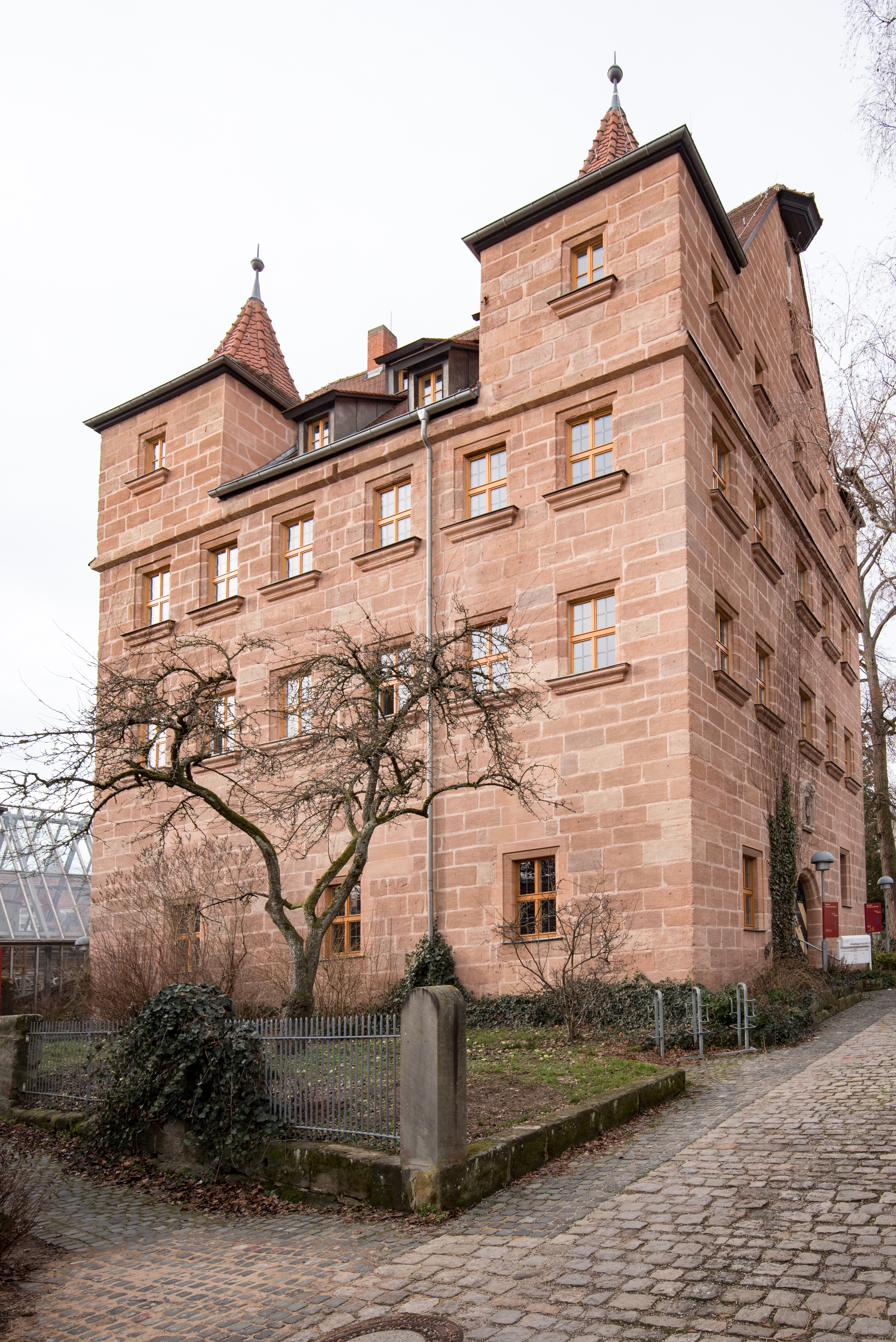
Pfinzingschloss in Feucht, a typical patrician residence from 1568

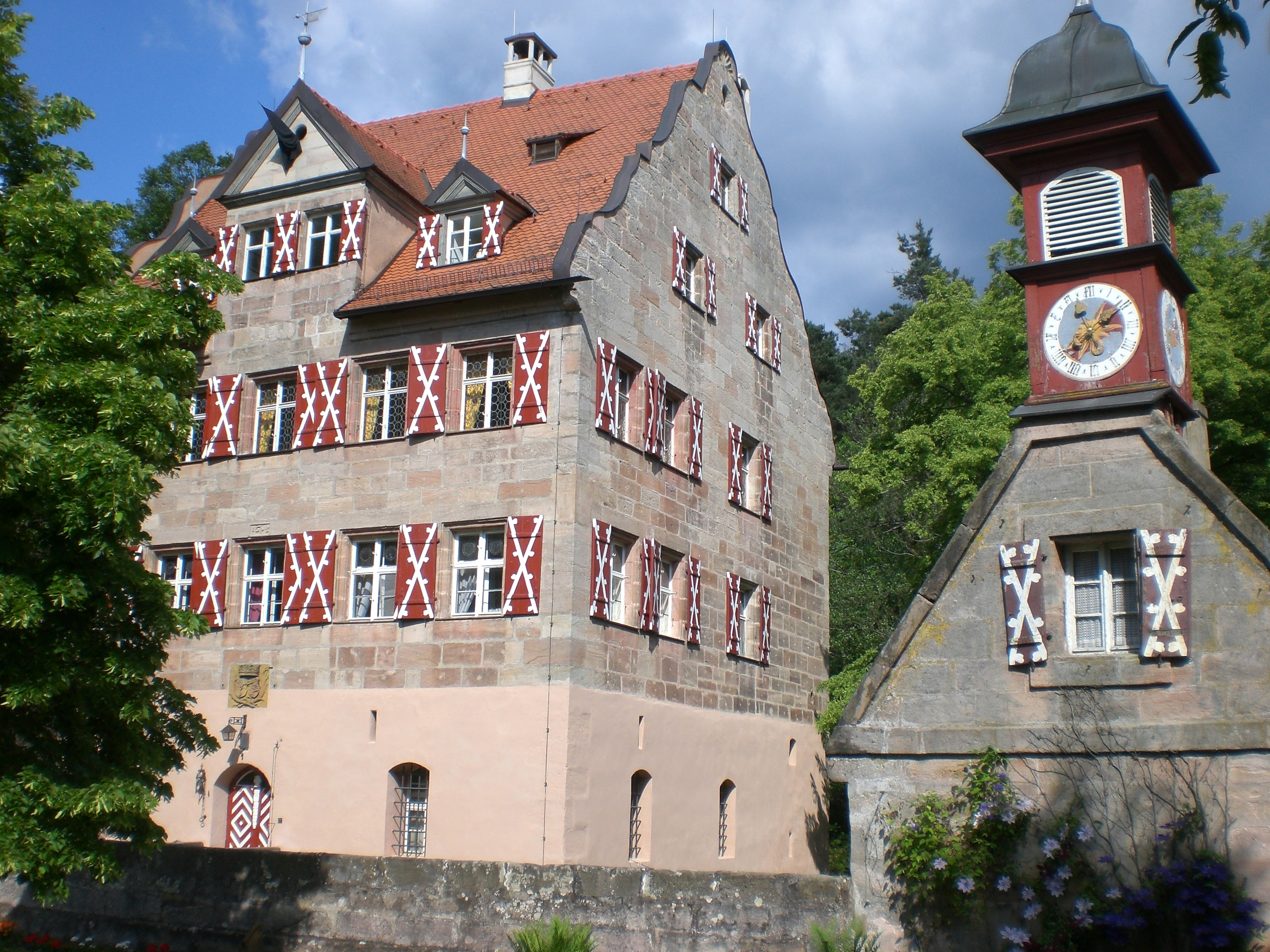
Kugelhammer Castle, a hammer lord's residence around 1600

== Coat of Arms Gallery ==
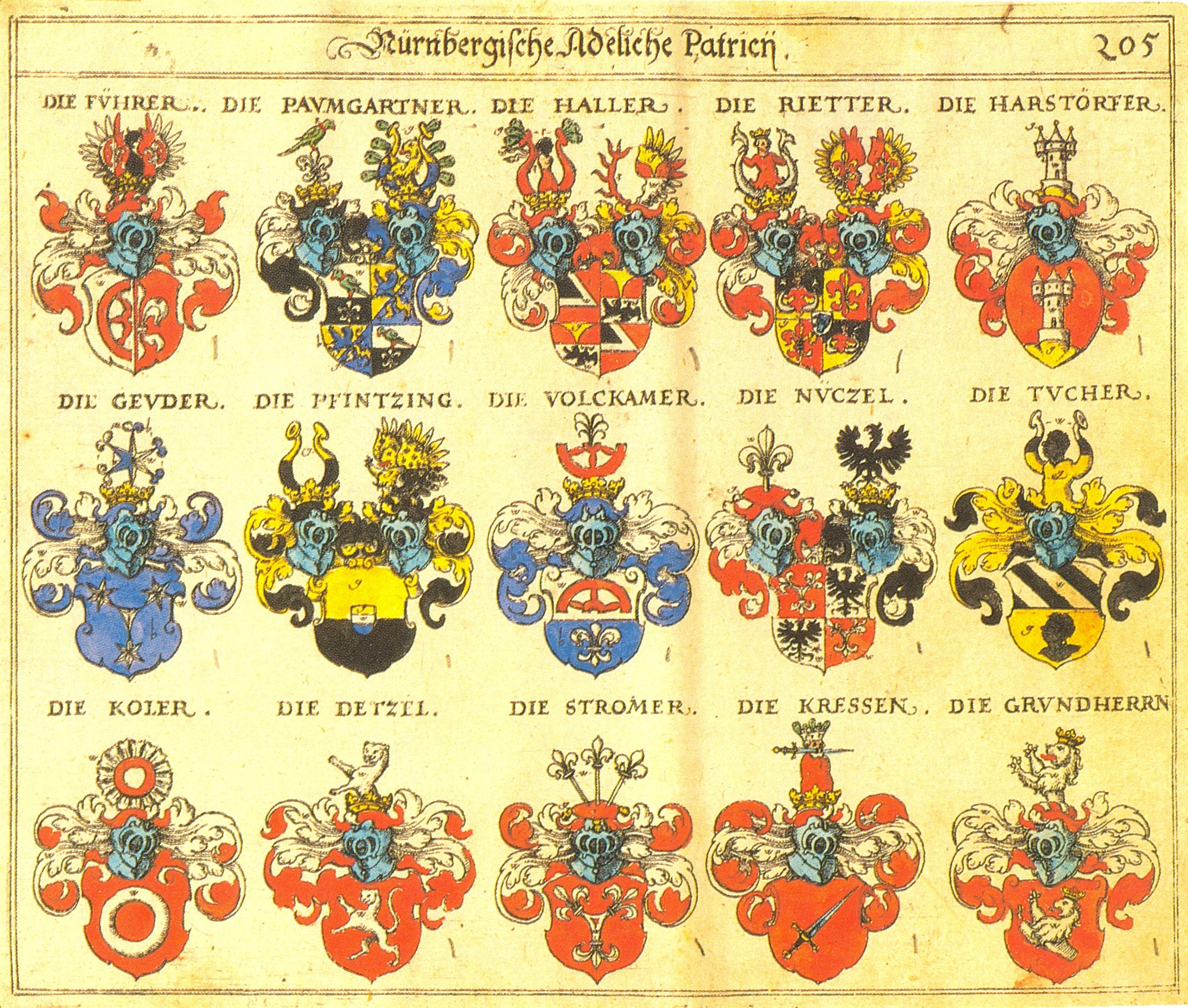
Patrician families 1 (Siebmachers Wappenbuch)

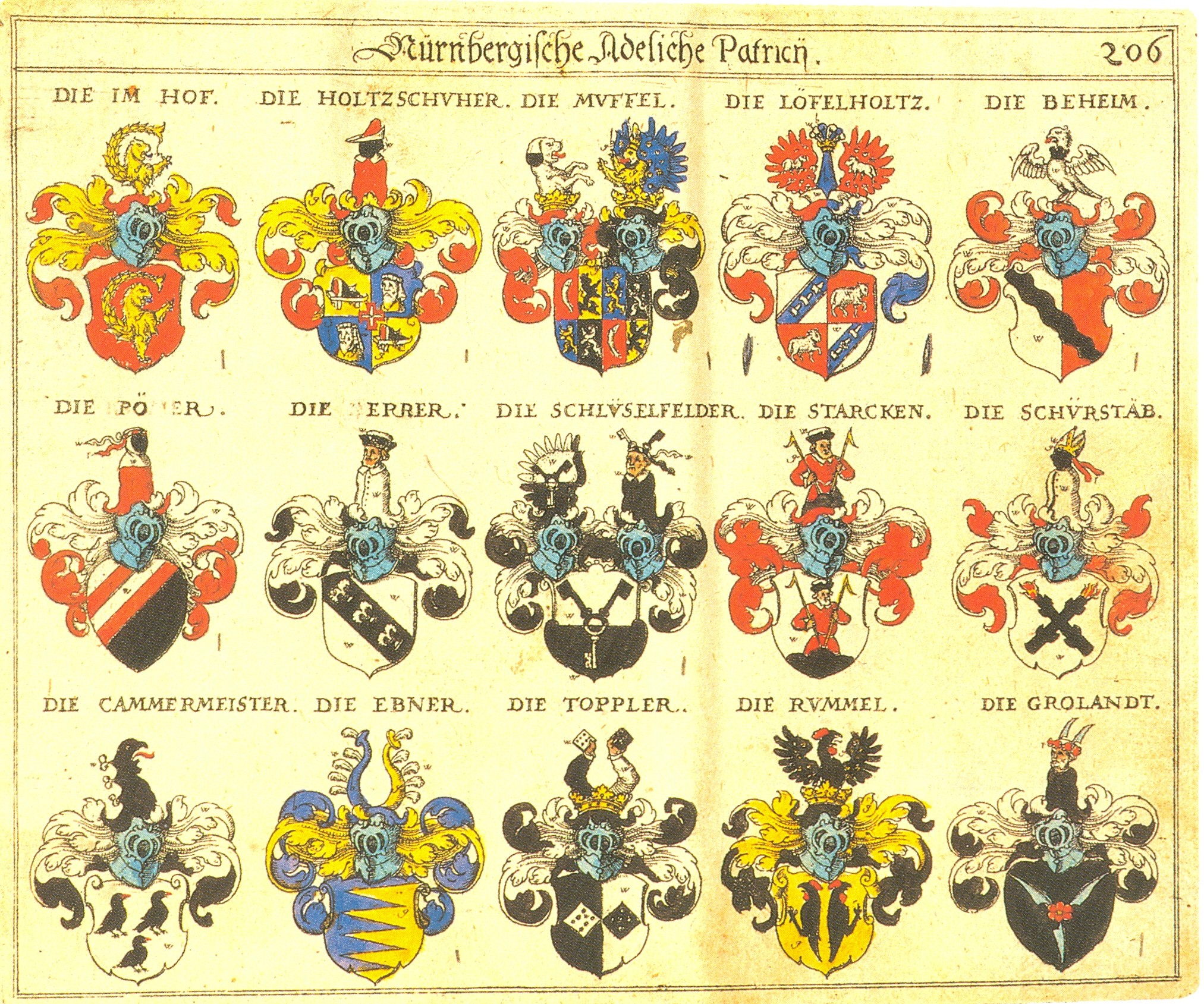
Patrician families 2

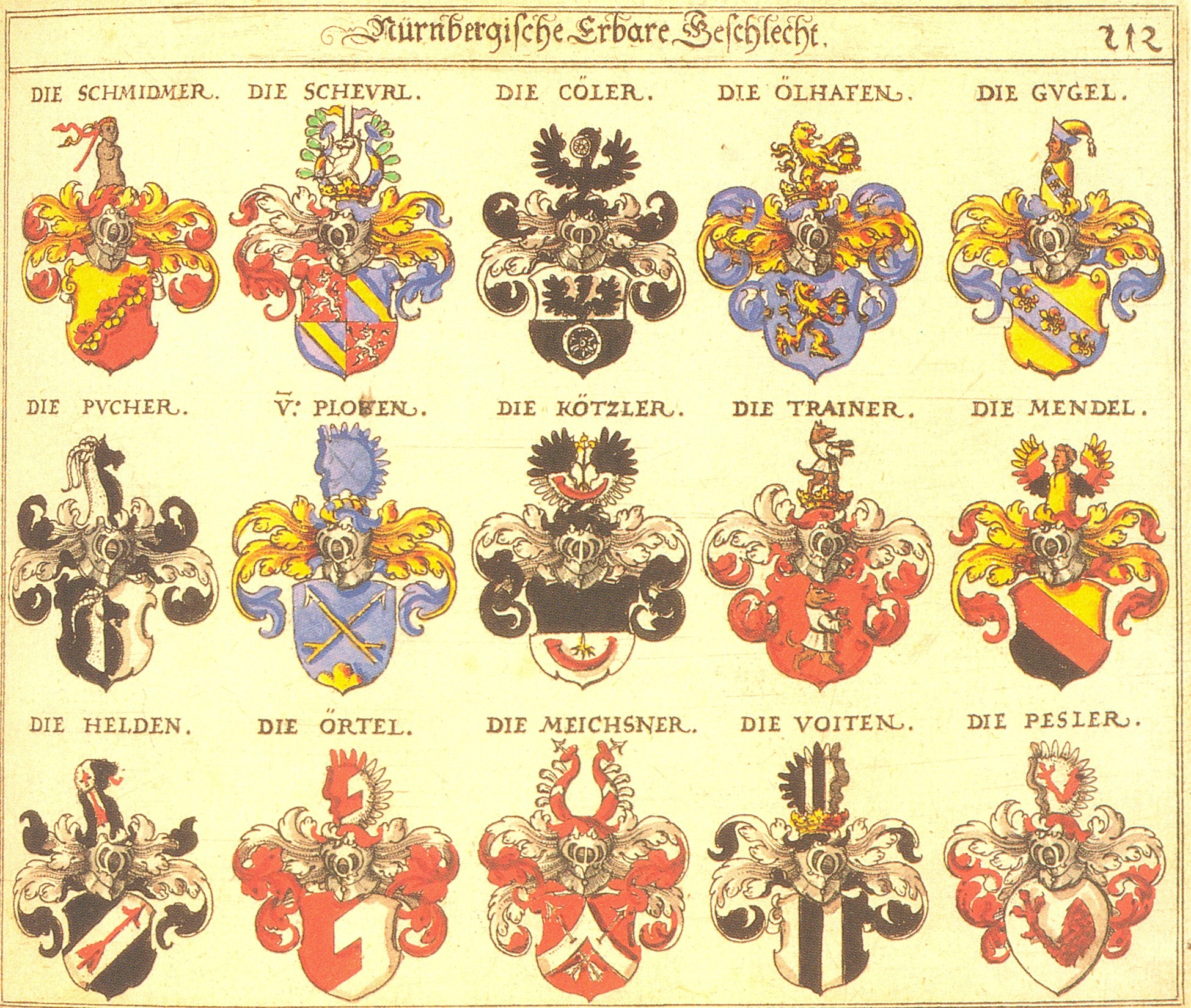
Honorable families 1

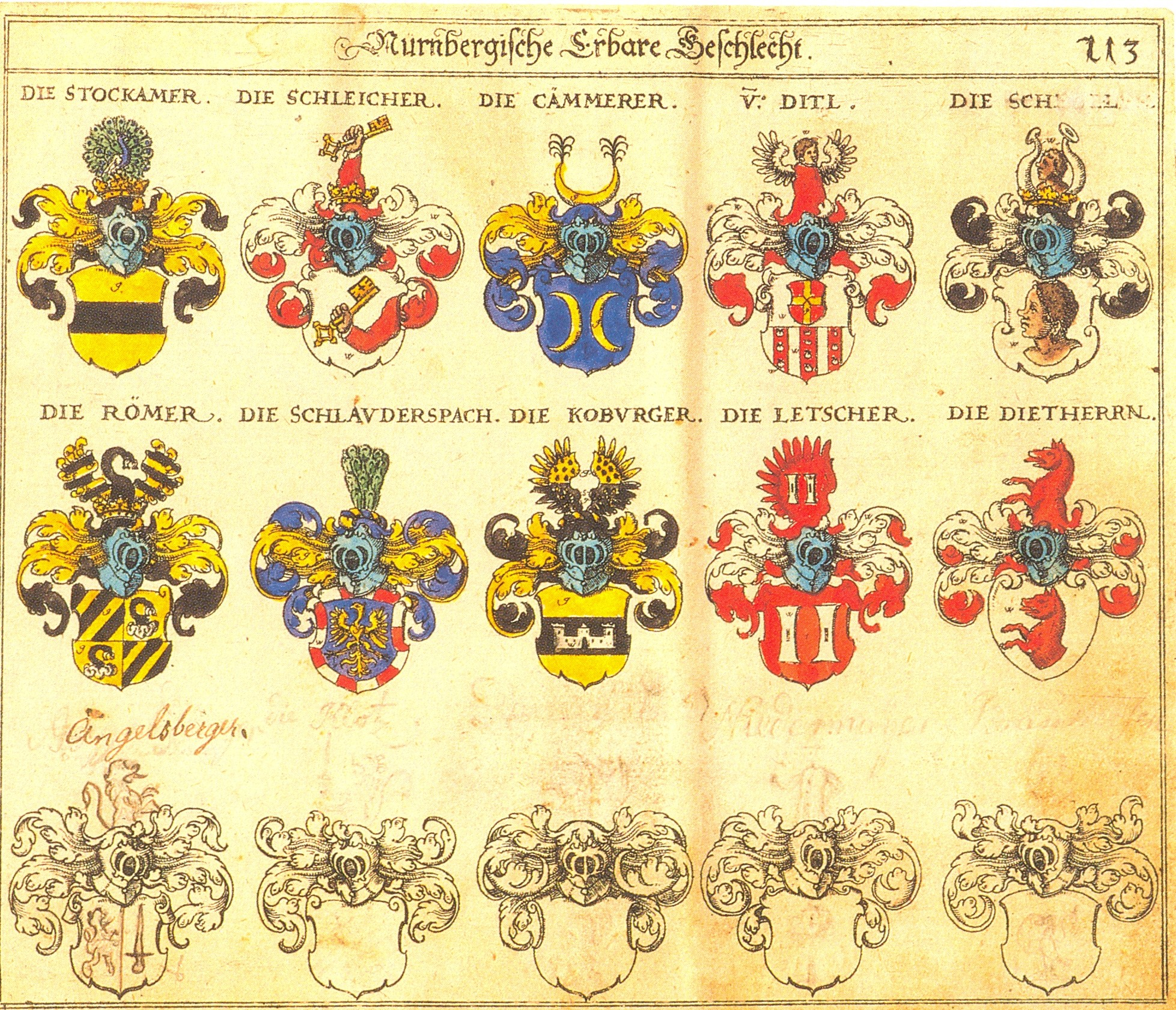
Honorable families 2

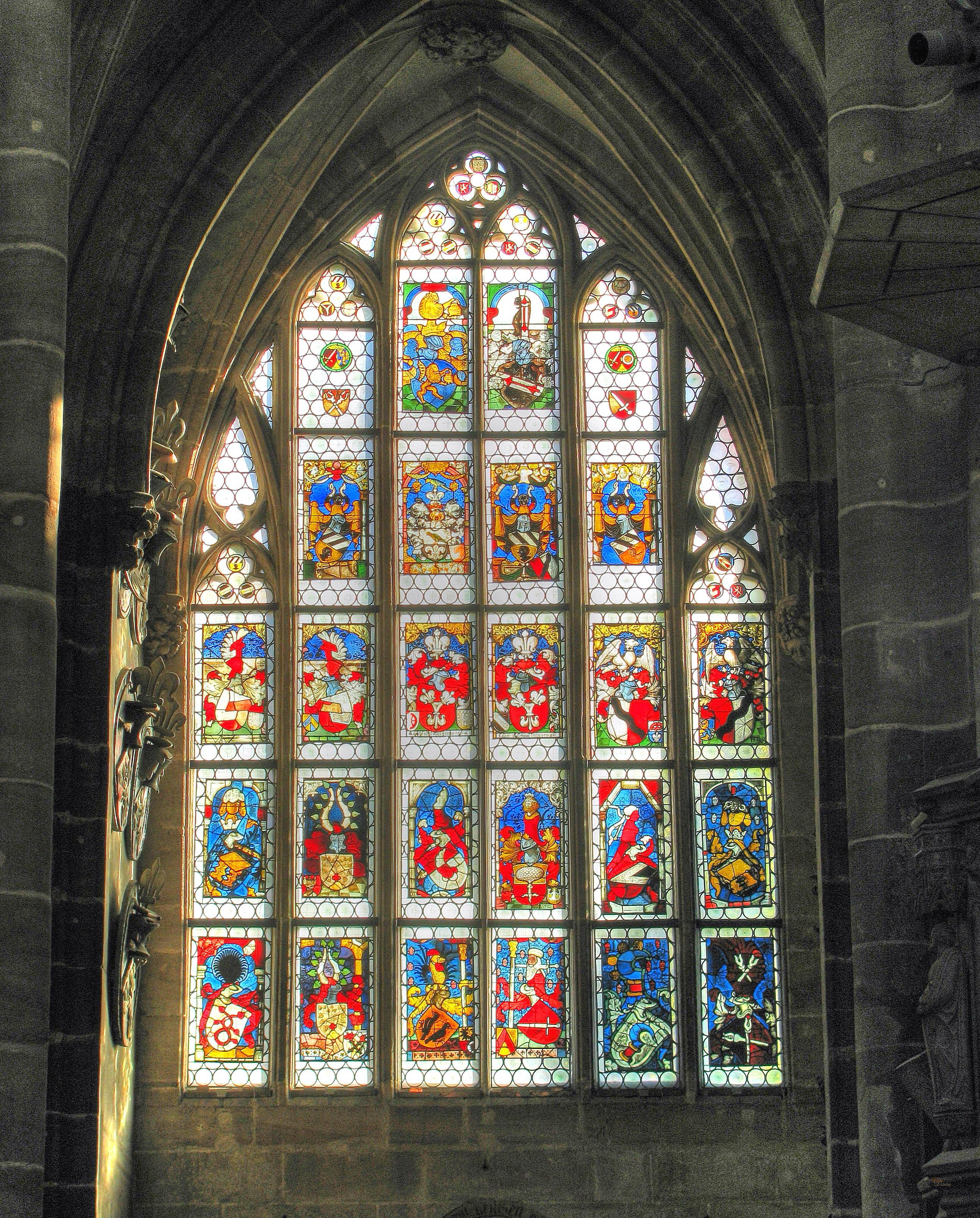
Coat of arms window in the Lorenzkirche

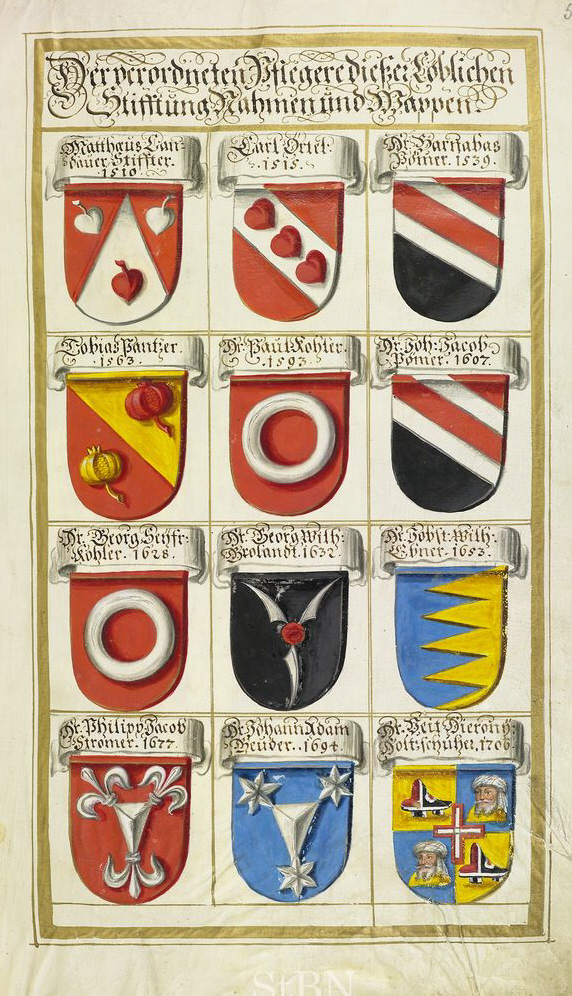
The keepers of the Landauerschen Zwölfbrüderhausstiftungen, from 1519

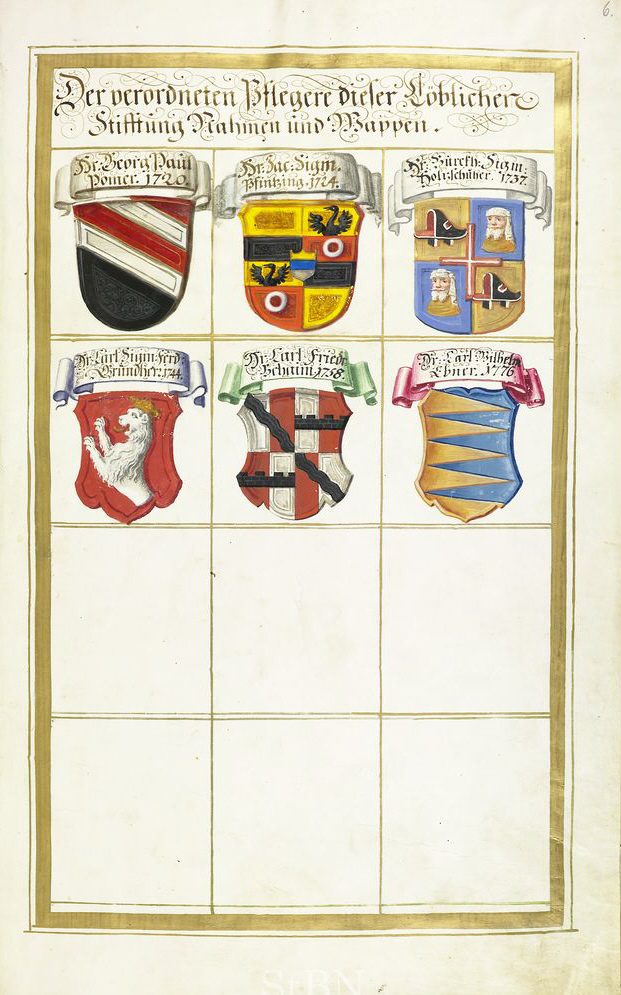
until 1776 (insofar as patricians are dubbed Hr., But without from )

== See also ==
- Patrizier
- Dance Statute
- Patriziat von Basel
