= Emhoff (surname) =

Emhoff is a surname (variant of Imhoff). Notable people with the name include:

- Doug Emhoff (born 1964), American lawyer and U.S. Second Gentleman from 2021 to 2025
- Ella Emhoff (born 1999), American fashion designer and model, daughter of Doug
- Kerstin Emhoff (born 1967), American film producer and CEO, ex-wife of Doug

== See also ==
- Imhoff
