= Ehinger =

Ehinger is a surname. Notable people with the surname include:

- Ambrosius Ehinger (ca. 1500–1533), German conquistador
- Andreas Bischoff-Ehinger (1812–1875), Swiss entomologist
- Parker Ehinger (born 1992), American football guard

== See also ==
- Villa Ehinger (Münchenstein), Villa in Switzerland
