= Dance Statute =

Town hall balls in Nuremberg

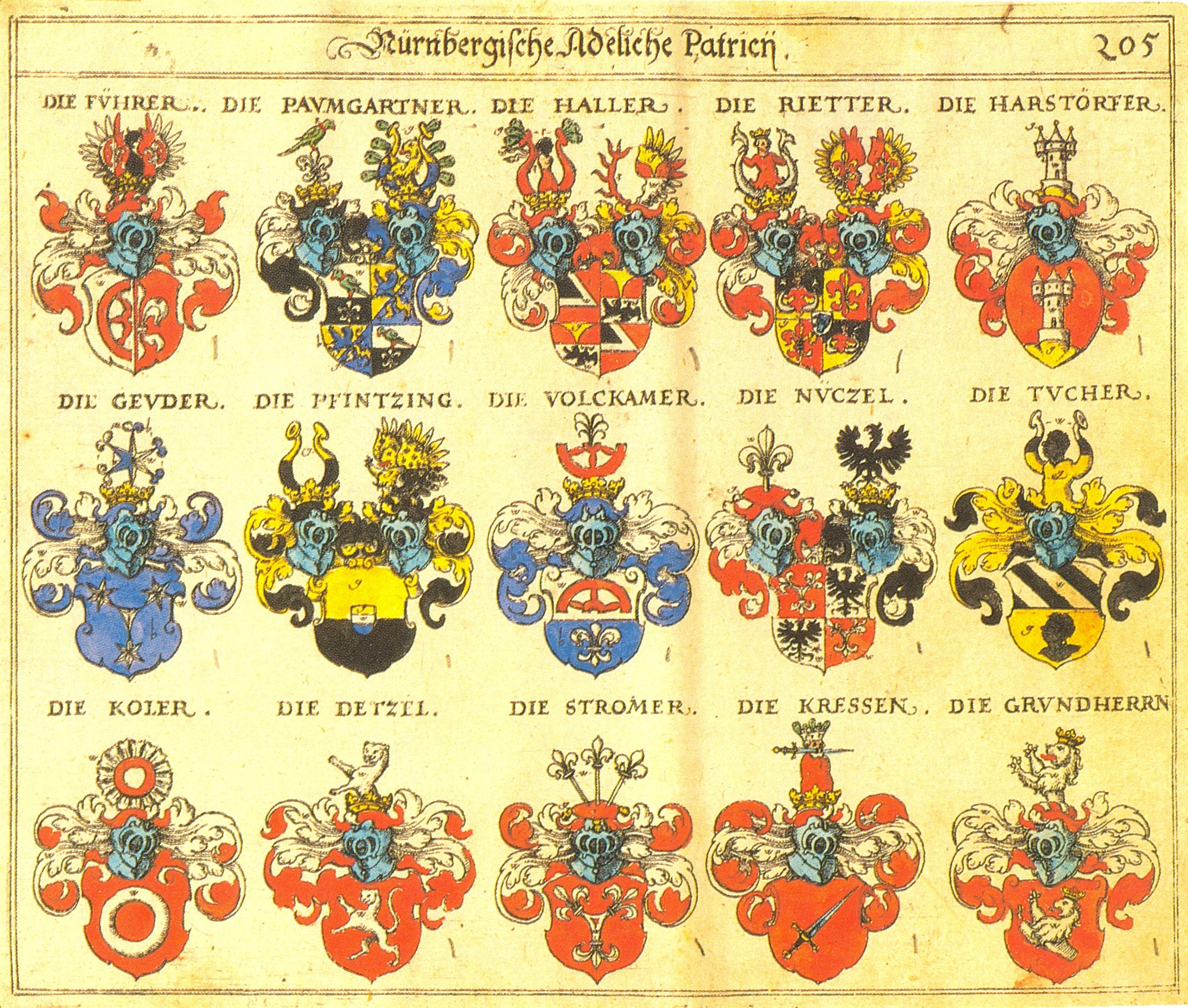
Johann Siebmacher: Nürnbergische Adeliche Patricii (1605)

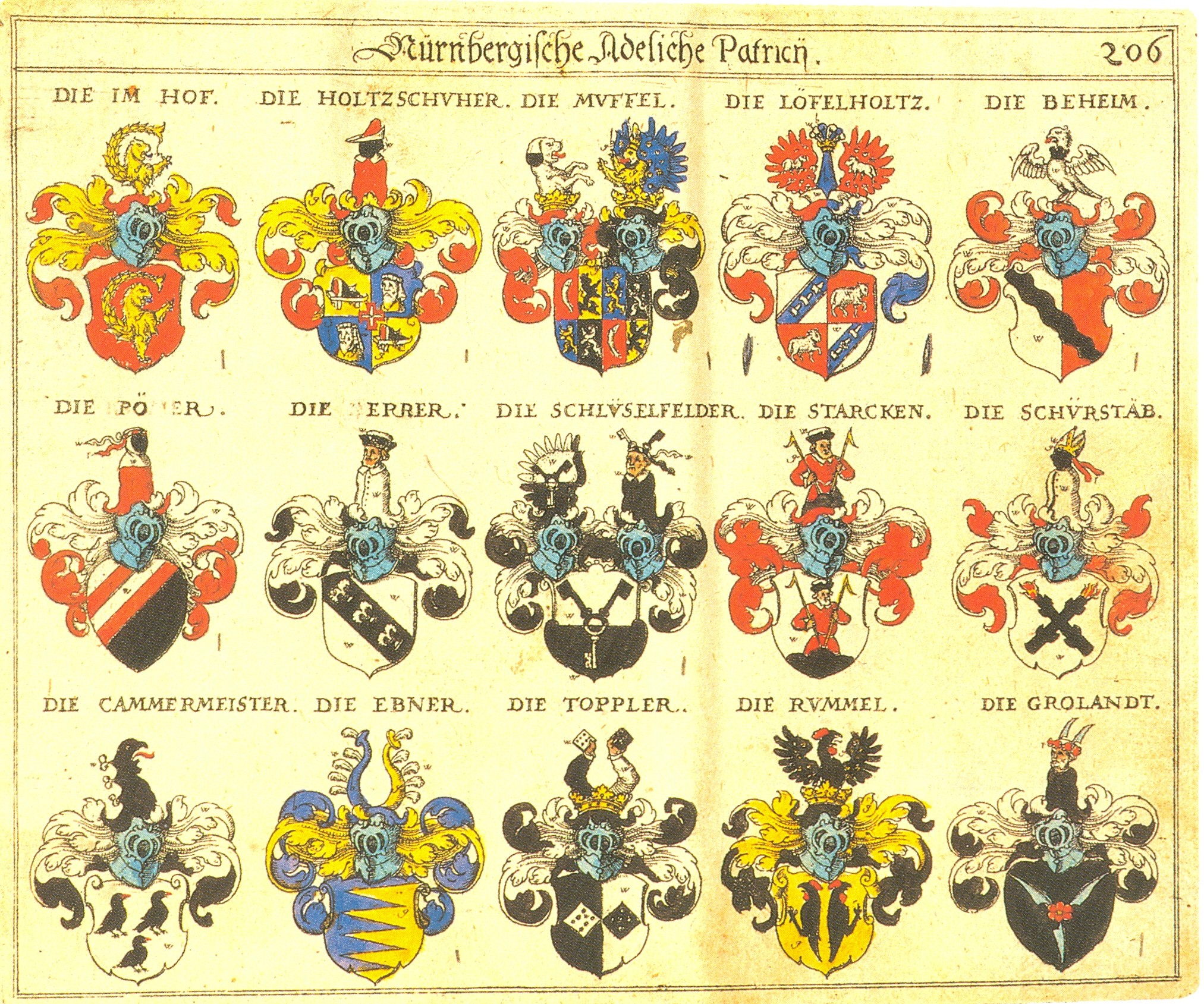
Siebmacher

The Dance Statute established in 1521 a set of politically influential town hall balls that the magistrate of the Imperial City of Nuremberg held on certain days of the year, such as Sundays of the Lord's Carnival, or in honor of princes in the Old City Hall. Almost exclusively members of the Ratsfähig families of the Nuremberg patriciate were invited. Ratsfähig meant that the families were allowed to send up to two members to the ruling "Inner Council" of the city.

The Dance Statute distinguished, in the sense of a closed list, the forty-two patrician families then in existence who were eligible for council, which were divided according to the age of their council membership into twenty old families, seven new families admitted after 1385, and fifteen other families first admitted after 1440. In practice, however, this distinction no longer played a major role, because shortly afterwards members of the younger lines were also able to hold the highest offices. In 1521, under certain conditions, six of the more than fifty so-called "respectable lineages" who were not eligible for council but who were "eligible for court" (i.e., judges) and formed the Second Estate, and a few named citizens, were also admitted to the dance.

The stipulation made in the Dance Statute expressed the conclusion of a longer development, in which the other respectable families had been excluded from the city authority in the course of the 15th century. As a result, the social mobility of the ruling class largely came to a standstill. In 1536, with the rise of the Schlüsselfelder von Kirchensittenbach to the patriciate, a last amendment of the Dance Statute took place. No new families were able to ascend to the council until 1729.

The Dance Statute, although it had no constitutional or law-making power, shows, on the one hand, an awareness of the historical development in Nuremberg, and on the other hand, it demonstrates a political claim to class and social exclusivity, which was defended by all means. The town hall dances are said to have ceased as early as the beginning of the 17th century. After 1806, when the patriciate was incorporated into the Bavarian nobility, the Dance Statute no longer played a formal role, but eventually, most of the old families succeeded in joining the Freiherr class.

== See also ==
- Nuremberg#Middle Ages
- Patriciate (Nuremberg)

== Literature ==
- Eugen Kusch: Nuremberg. Life picture of a city. 5th edition. Nürnberger Presse, Nuremberg 1989, ISBN 3-920701-79-8.
- Christian von Imhoff (Ed.): Famous Nuremberg citizens from nine centuries. 2nd supplemented and expanded edition. Hofmann, Nuremberg 1989, ISBN 3-87191-088-0.
