= Nuremberg City Hall =

City Hall in Nuremberg, Germany

Coordinates: 49°27′18.7″N 11°04′39.2″E

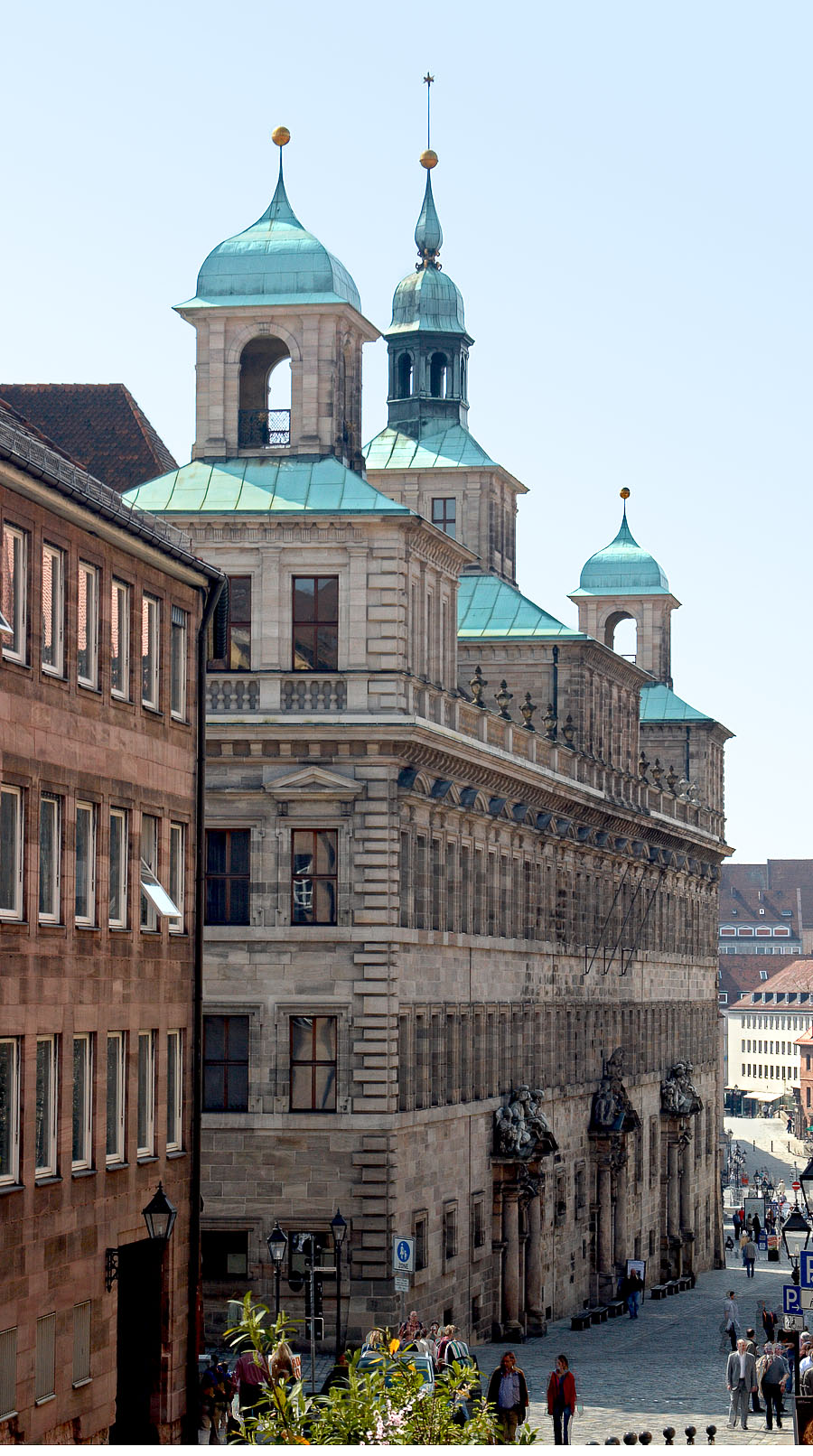
West facade of the Old Town Hall from the northwest, 2006

Nuremberg City Hall (German: Nürnberger Rathaus) is located in the old town of Nuremberg, Germany, just east of the choir of the Sebalduskirche. It is part of the Historic Mile of Nuremberg as one of the city's sights. The imposing Renaissance building was designed by architect Jakob Wolff the Younger (1571–1620). It was severely damaged during World War II and was largely rebuilt in the 1950s. In the process, the structure was shortened by two window axes on the north side. On the south side is a core Gothic hall designed by Albrecht Dürer. The Lochgefängnisse, located in the basement, are considered a tourist attraction, as is the Beautiful Fountain, located directly in front of the New City Hall, designed by Kurt Schneckendorf and built from 1954 to 1956. This building replaced the row of houses between the Old Town Hall and the Hauptmarkt, which had been destroyed during the war.

== Building history ==
=== Old town hall ===
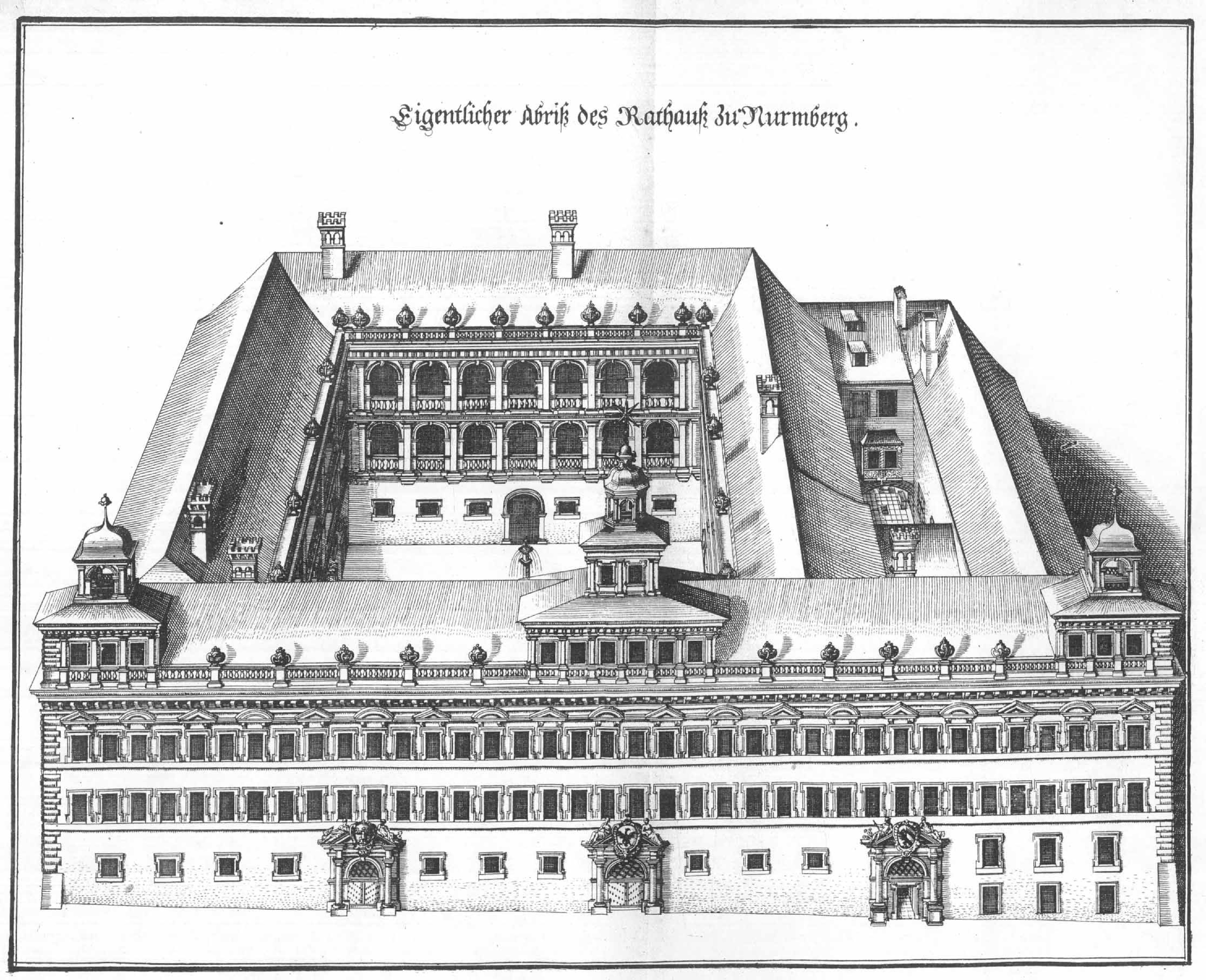
Depiction of the town hall by Matthäus Merian in the Topographia Franconiae, 1656

Until the 14th century, the city did not have its own city hall. Instead, the Council met in a house of the clothiers, which is alternately referred to in documents as the Gewandhaus, only as a house or as der Bürger Haus. It was not until the Lorenzer and Sebalder halves of the city were united to form the universitas civium and connected by a common wall that the council acquired an estate from the Heilsbronn Monastery in 1322 and later expanded the area to the north by purchasing additional houses and converting it for administrative purposes.

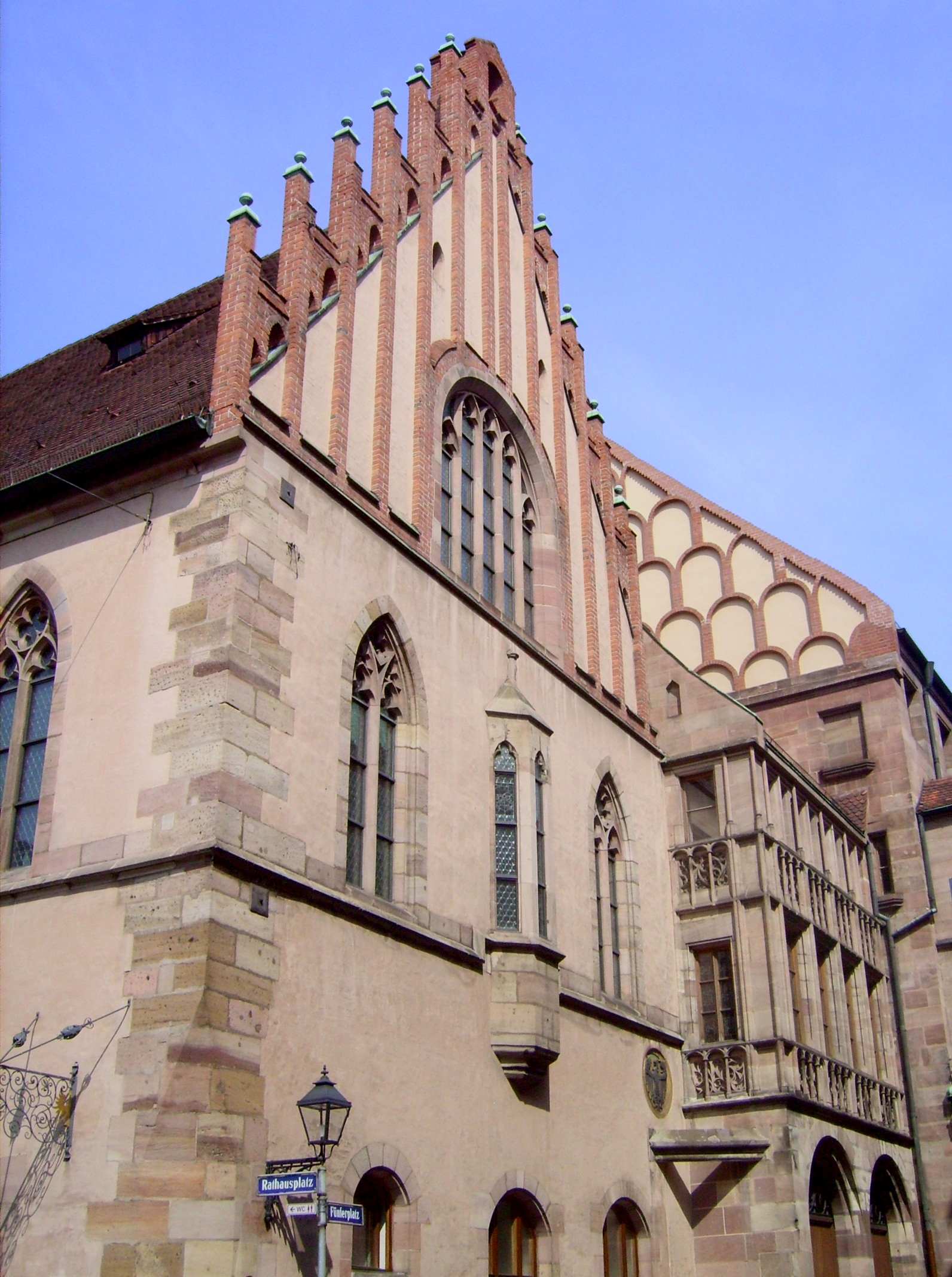
East facade of the Gothic hall building, 2006

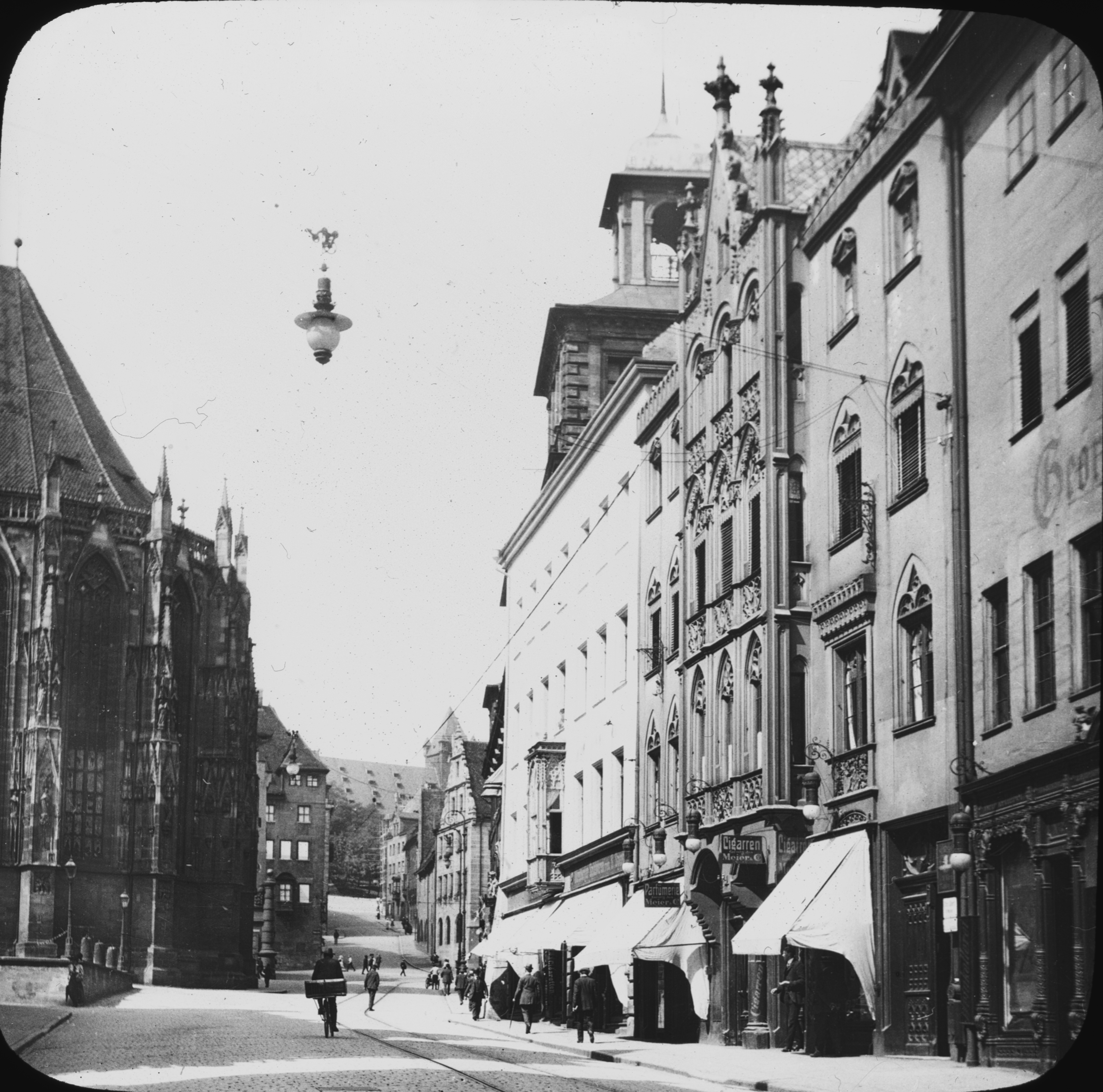
West facade with a view of the Sebalduskirche and shops, where parts of today's town hall stand

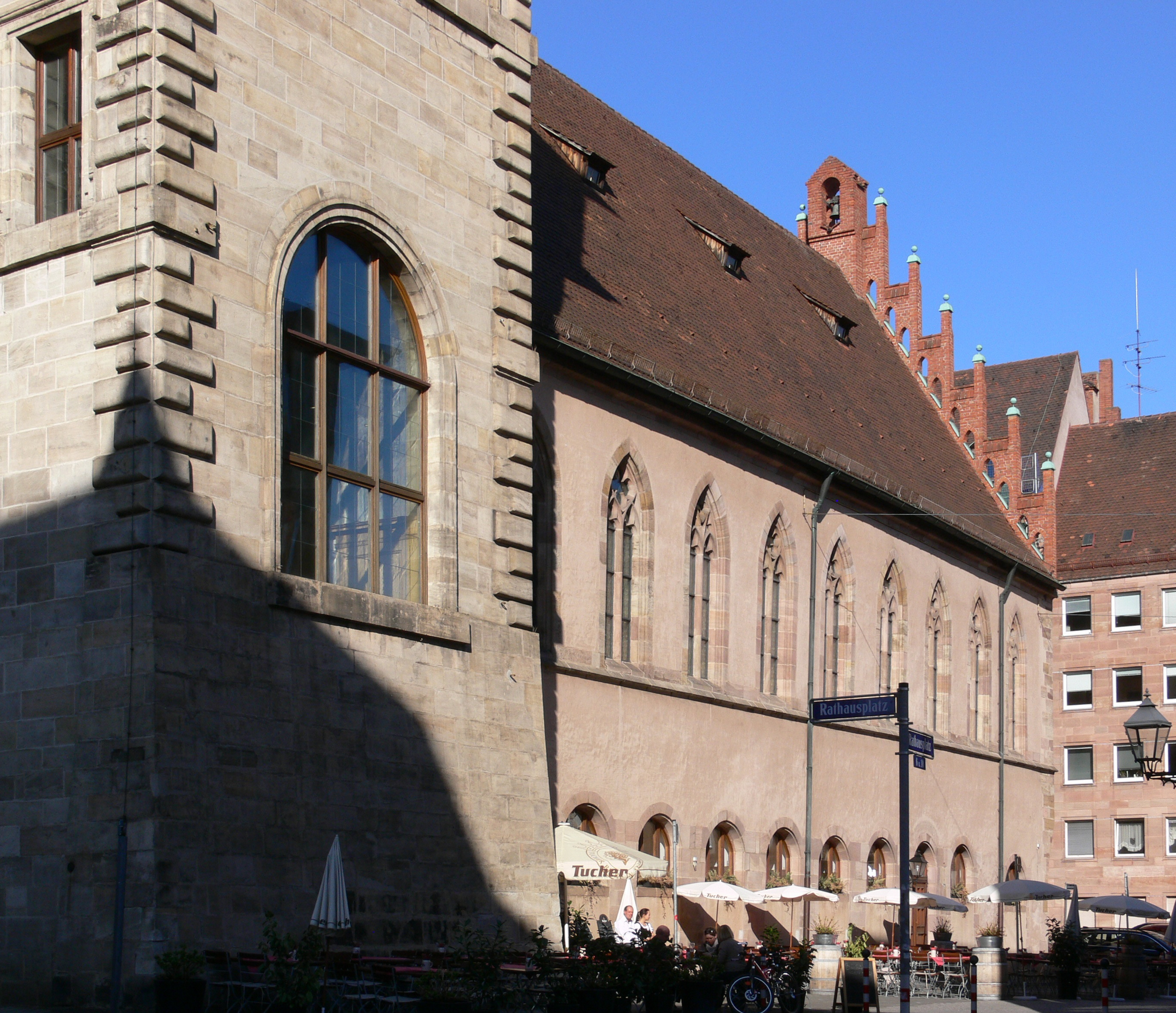
South facade of the Gothic hall building, 2010

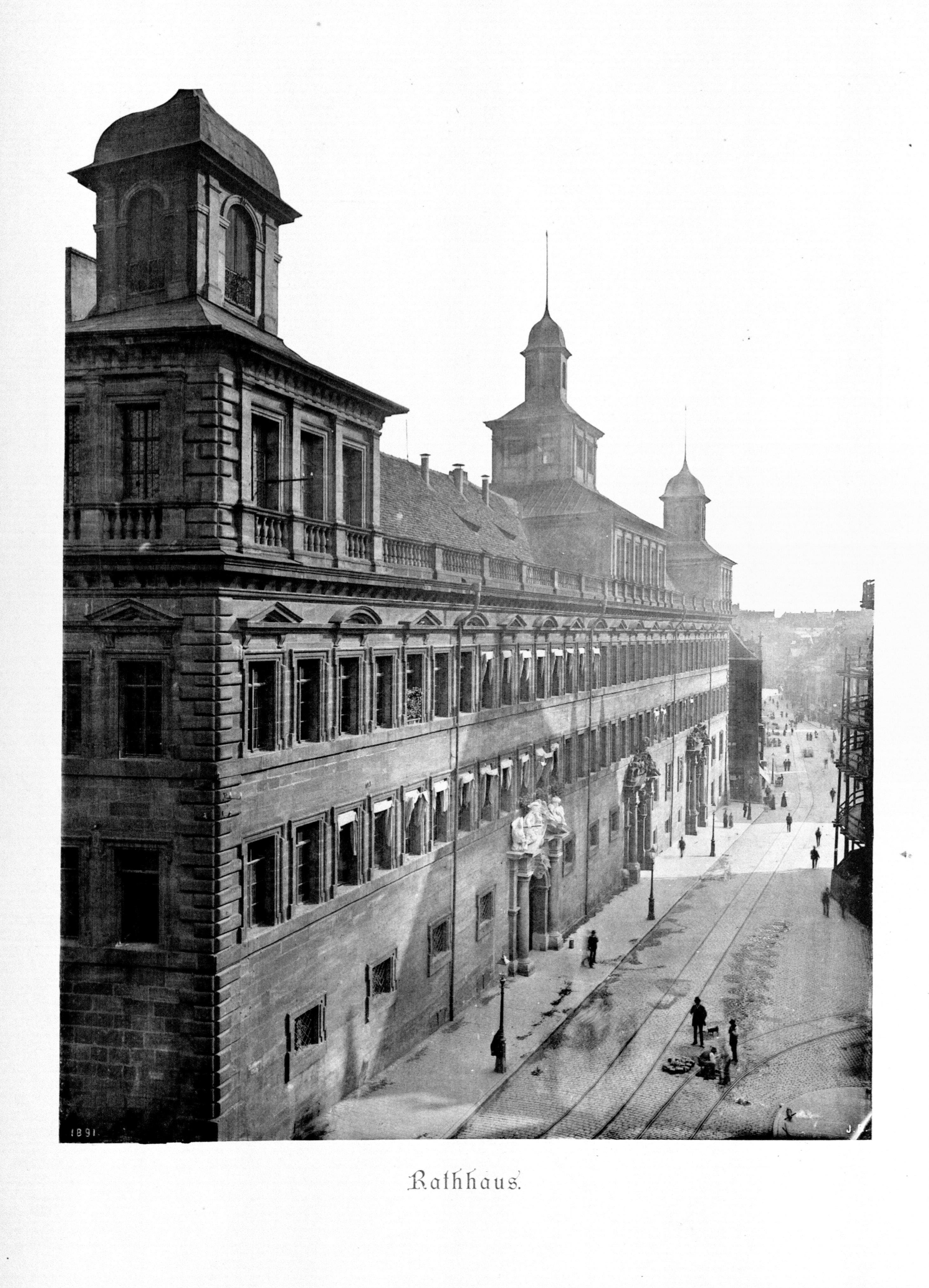
West facade of the Old Town Hall, 1891

The hall building on the south side, which contains the großer Rathaussaal on the upper floor, was built as the oldest part of the building complex in 1332–1340 under the direction of the city architect Philipp Groß. The hall building of the 14th century was joined by two annexes along the town hall courtyard to the north, of which the one with the council chamber on the east side has been preserved.

At the beginning of the 16th century, the town council undertook an extensive renovation of the town hall. The so-called Ratsstube building with the late Gothic curtain wall facade was built by Hans Beheim the Elder in 1514–1515 in the north. The painting of the facade was carried out in 1521, and the painting of the great hall according to designs and under the direction of Albrecht Dürer was begun in 1521 and finished in 1528/30. It was the largest mural and ceiling painting in Europe at the time, surpassed only by the Sistine Chapel begun ten years later.

With the self-confidence of a flourishing Reichsstadt, it was decided to build a new building in the architecture of an Italian palace almost 100 years later. After preliminary planning and conception by the city architect Wolf Jacob Stromer, planned by Jakob Wolff the Younger as a four-wing complex (therefore also called Wolff'scher Bau), the building in 1616–1622 did not turn out to be so Italian after all. Although the horizontal, hitherto unknown in Nuremberg history, plays a dominant role in the elongated monumental building, the roof region returns to the native vertical with the Dwarf Houses, completely unthinkable in Italy.

The foundation stones were laid in 1616 and 1619. On the west side, all Gothic building elements were sacrificed to it. The uniform window front contrasts with the three Baroque portals, whose sculptures, including figures from the Bible book of Daniel, were commissioned by the city council in 1617 and designed by the sculptor Leonhard Kern. Above the central portal, the main entrance, is emblazoned the coat of arms of the Holy Roman Empire of the German Nation with the imperial eagle.

With the onset of the Thirty Years' War, construction slowed and came to a halt in 1622. Completed and furnished were the main building in the west and three wings around the town hall courtyard. The buildings were not completed until after the end of the war. To this day, the facade characterizes the town hall.

The walls of the small town hall hall were decorated in 1825 in the course of restoration measures by Christian Friedrich Fues with painted portraits of famous Nuremberg donors. The magistrate had this cycle replaced in 1889/90 by history paintings by Friedrich Wanderer.

In the northeast corner of the large courtyard of the town hall and on the south side of Theresienstrasse, new buildings in the neo-Gothic style were constructed in 1885–1889 according to plans by August Essenwein. Hans Pylipp built, at about the same time, a new office building in place of the old Fünferhaus on Fünferplatz. Heinrich Wallraff based his 1907–1910 new buildings north of Theresienstrasse on the Nuremberg Renaissance of the 16th century. Among other things, parts of the buildings of the former Dominikanerkloster were demolished for this purpose.

In 1944–45, after bomb hits during the air raids on Nuremberg, the entire city hall complex burned down to the surrounding walls. It was not until 1956–1962 that the Old Town Hall was rebuilt on these ruins under the direction of Harald Clauß. The interior of the Old Town Hall was only restored between 1982 and 1985, including the wall paneling and the coffered wooden barrel ceiling. Because the photo documentation of the wall painting once executed by Albrecht Dürer's workshop according to his designs was lost, the painter Michael Mathias Prechtl was commissioned with a design for a contemporary painting. After a long controversial and bitter discussion, Prechtl withdrew his design in 1988, the walls remained white, and local politics decided on a "pause for reflection." After a video installation in the summer of the Dürer anniversary year 2012, in which both an animation based on the recovered photo documentation from 1944 and the projection of Prechtl's design on the still white wall were shown, a renewed discussion arose about the restoration of the painting.

=== New town hall ===
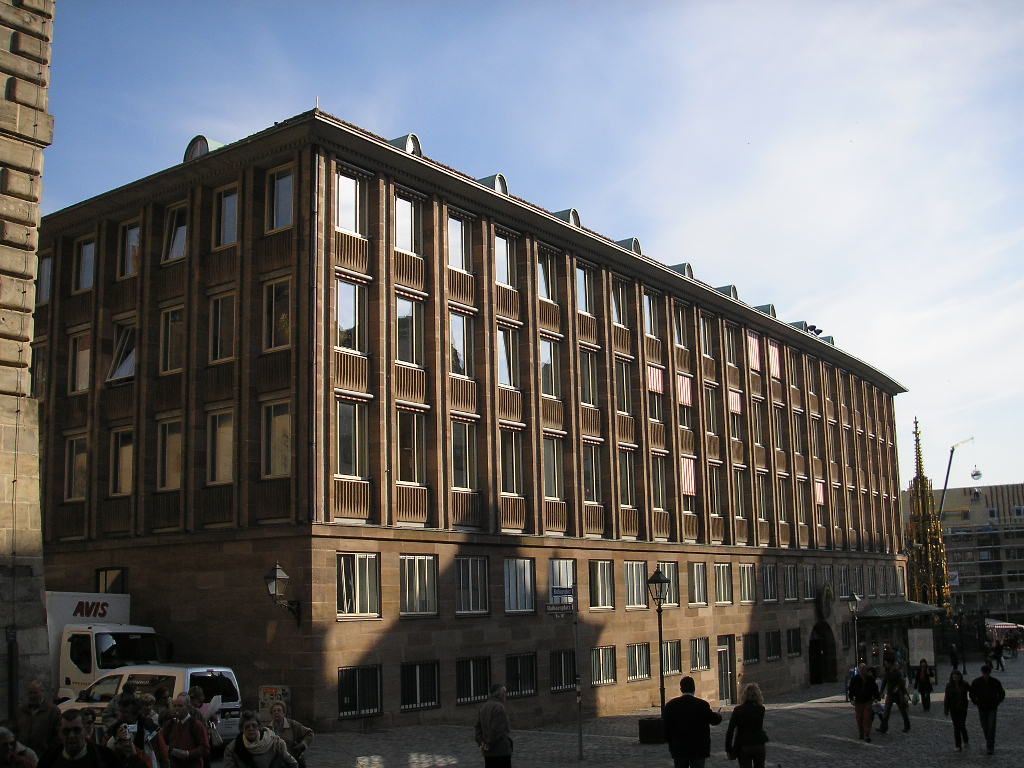
West facade of the New Town Hall from northwest, 2007

The buildings between the town hall and the northern end of the main market square were also destroyed during World War II. In 1951, architect Kurt Schneckendorf planned the so-called New Town Hall (also Schneckendorf Building) in their place, which was built from 1954 to 1956. The New City Hall is designed in the style of the 1950s with a grid facade. For the pilasters, sandstone was used to match the historic townscape. The alignment of the new building deviates from the right angle inwards and gives a view to the southern tower of the Old Town Hall.

== Trivia ==
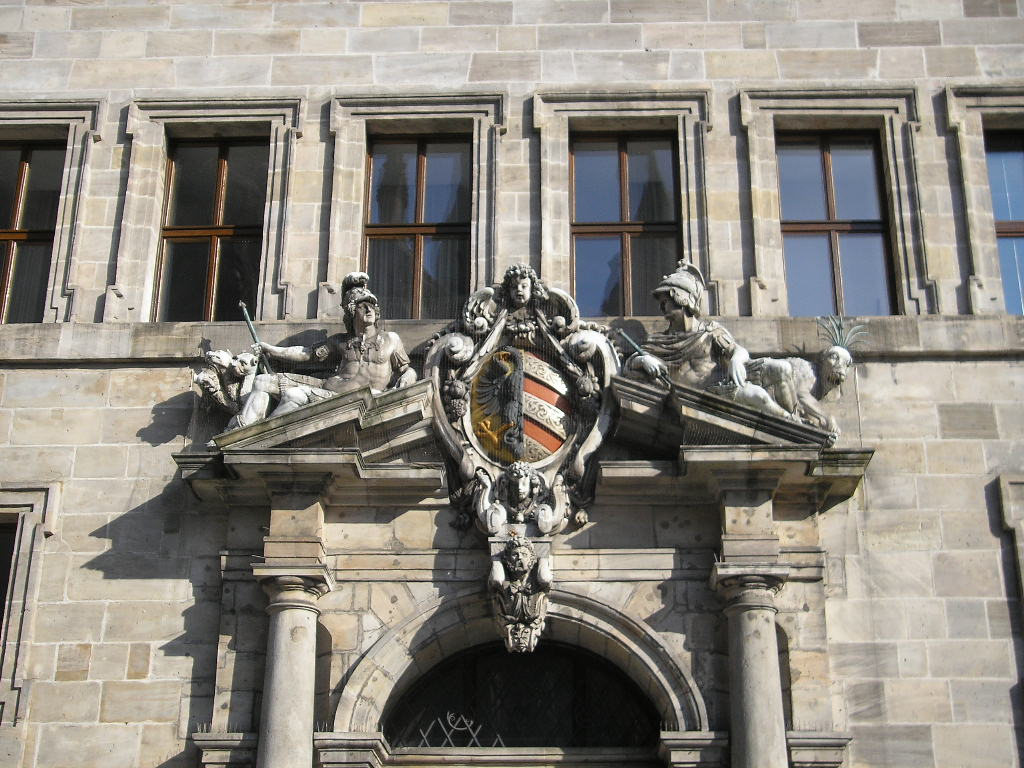
Right portal of the west facade with the many-headed, winged leopard and the beast with ten horns from Daniel 7 by Leonhard Kern

In an adjoining room of the Hall of Honor, replicas of the Imperial Crown, the Reichscepter and the Imperial Orb of the Holy Roman Empire of the German Nation were on display until 2013. Subsequently, they were on display at the Kaiserburg. From autumn 2016, they will form the centerpiece of the permanent exhibition in the Stadtmuseum Fembohaus. The original Imperial Regalia were once destined for eternal safekeeping in Nuremberg and have been in Vienna since 1800.

Among the sculptures enthroned on the three Baroque portals, created in 1617 by the sculptor Leonhard Kern, are figures depicting the prophecies in the 7th chapter of the Book of Daniel. Chapter of the Book of Daniel in the Old Testament of the Bible, where they stand for various world powers in history: EÜ and the bear EÜ on the portal to the left of the main entrance, the leopard with four bird wings and four heads EÜ and the mysterious beast with ten horns EÜ on the portal to the right of the main entrance.

== Literature ==
- W. Barth: Der Nürnberger Rathausbau des Jakob Wolff d. J., Erlangen, 1986 (master's thesis).
- Christian Brick: Reconstruction and repainting of the Old Nuremberg Town Hall Hall. A documentation. Berlin, 1991. (download 85.2 MB)
- Harald Clauß, Julius Lincke: The Old City Hall and the Great City Hall Hall since their War Destruction.
  - I. Harald Clauß: The restoration in shell 1956/1958 and the installation of the restaurant 1962
  - II Julius Lincke: Plans and measures for the restoration of the interior 1977. In: Nürnberger Altstadtberichte, ed.: Altstadtfreunde Nürnberg e.V., issue 5 (1980).
- Michael Diefenbacher, Rudolf Endres, ed. (2000), City Hall, Nuremberg City Lexicon (Stadtlexikon Nürnberg) (in German) (2nd, revised ed.), Nuremberg: W. Tümmels Verlag, ISBN 3-921590-69-8
- Isabelle Guyot: L'empreinte luthérienne dans les hôtels de ville du Saint-Empire de la paix d'Augsbourg à la fin de la guerre de Trente ans : Lunebourg, Nuremberg, Augsbourg, Université Lumière, Lyon 2, 2006 (master's thesis).
- K. Matthäus: On the History of the Nuremberg Calendar. The development of annual calendars printed in Nuremberg. In: Buchform, Offprint from the Archive for the History of the Book Trade. Vol. 9: Deliveries 3-5, Nuremberg. Nuremberg State Archives, Nuremberg 1968, pp. 966–1395.
- Matthias Mende: The Old Nuremberg City Hall. Building history and furnishings of the great hall and the council chamber. Nuremberg 1979 (= Stadtgeschichtliche Museen Nürnberg. volume 15).
  - Matthias Mende (ed.): Albrecht Dürer - ein Künstler in seiner Stadt, Nuremberg 2000; passim also on the town hall renovation under Albrecht Dürer (esp. p. 216 ff.).
- E. Mummenhoff (ed.): Studies on the Topography and History of Nuremberg City Halls, Collectif, Mitteilung des Vereins für Geschichte der Stadt Nürnberg, Fünftes Heft, Nuremberg, Im Selbstverlag des Vereins, 1884, 240 pp., pp. 137–214.
  - E. Mummenhoff, H. Wallraff: Das Rathaus in Nürnberg, Nuremberg, Schrag, 1891, 365 pp.
- K. H. Schreyl (ed.): Emblema Politica. Die Sinnbilder im Nürnberger Rathaussaal, Nuremberg, Verlag Hans Carl und Stadtgeschichtliche Museen Nürnberg, 1980, 96 pp.
