= Imhoff =

Imhoff or Imhof is a German surname. Notable people with the surname include:

- Imhoff family, one of the oldest patrician families in the German city of Nuremberg
- Anne Imhof (born 1978) German contemporary artist
- Berthold Imhoff (1868–1939), German-Canadian painter
- Daniel Imhof (born 1977), Canadian soccer player
- Darrall Imhoff (1938–2017), American basketball player
- Dominic Imhof (born 1982), Canadian soccer player, brother of Daniel
- Eduard Imhof (1895–1986), Swiss cartographer
- Facundo Imhoff (born 1989), Argentine volleyball player
- Floris van Imhoff (born 1964), Dutch curler
- Frank Imhoff (born 1968), German farmer and politician
- Fritz Imhoff (1891–1961), Austrian actor
- Gary Imhoff (born 1952), American actor
- Guillermo Imhoff (born 1982), Argentine football player
- Gustaaf Willem van Imhoff (1705–1750), governor of Ceylon and the Dutch East Indies
- Hans Imhoff (1922–2007), German industrialist and businessman
- Hans Walter Imhoff (1886–1971), Swiss football player
- Joseph Imhoff (1871–1955), American painter
- Juan José Imhoff (born 1988), Argentine rugby player
- Karl Imhoff (1876–1965), German engineer, inventor of the Imhoff tank for sewage processing
- Laura van Imhoff, Dutch curler and coach
- Lawrence E. Imhoff (1895–1988), American soldier, lawyer, and politician from Ohio
- Leopold Freiherr von Imhof (1869–1922), Austrian civil servant and Governor of Liechtenstein
- Martin Imhof (born 1949), American football player
- Maximus von Imhof (1758–1817), German physicist
- Pedro Imhoff (born 1989), Argentine rugby player
- Roger Imhof (1875–1958), American actor and vaudeville and burlesque performer
- Sigmund von Imhoff (1881–1967), German soldier

== See also ==
- Emhoff
