= Andreas Bischoff-Ehinger =

Swiss entomologist

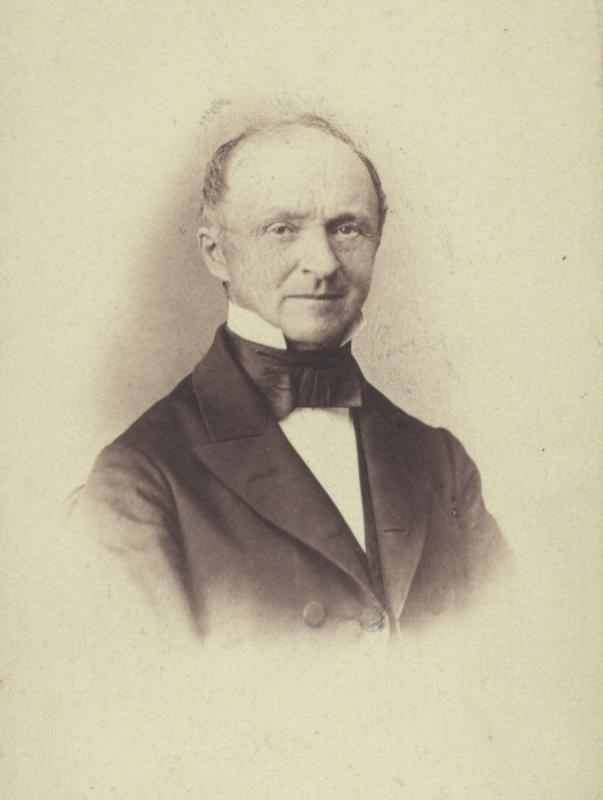
Andreas Bischoff-Ehinger

Andreas Bischoff-Ehinger (20 November 1812, Basel – 29 July 1875, Basel) was a Swiss entomologist

Bischoff-Ehinger specialized in Coleoptera. He was an insect dealer. The Bischoff-Ehinger collection is in the Natural History Museum of Basel
