= Fütterer =

Fütterer is a German-language occupational surname. Notable people with the surname include:

- Danny Fütterer
- Heinz Fütterer

== See also ==
- Füetrer
