= Daniel Imhof =

Swiss-born Canadian soccer player (born 1977)

Personal information
- Full name: Daniel Wendel Imhof
- Date of birth: 22 November 1977 (age 48)
- Place of birth: Wil, Switzerland
- Height: 1.78 m (5 ft 10 in)
- Position: Midfielder

Youth career
- 1992–1996: Bulkley Valley Blast
- 1996–1998: University of Victoria

Senior career*
Years	Team	Apps	(Gls)
1998–1999	FC Wil	33	(3)
1999–2005	St. Gallen	152	(9)
2005–2009	VfL Bochum	94	(5)
2010–2012	St. Gallen	66	(1)
Total		345	(18)

International career
2000–2010	Canada	37	(0)
Medal record
Representing Canada
Men's soccer
CONCACAF Gold Cup
Third place	2002 United States
- * Club domestic league appearances and goals

Daniel Wendel Imhof (born 22 November 1977) is a former professional soccer player who played as a midfielder. Born in Switzerland, he made 37 appearances for the Canada national team.

== Club career ==
=== Early life ===
Imhof was born in Wil, Switzerland, but his parents, Wendel and Edith Imhof, immigrated to Canada when he was four. Imhof grew up in Smithers, British Columbia and started a study to become a sport teacher at the University of Victoria. In this period he was key player of the university's soccer team. His two brothers play in the lower leagues in Switzerland; Dominic Imhof plays for FC Tuggen and Christoph Imhof played for FC Gossau. He also has a younger sister, Angela Imhof.

=== Switzerland ===
During the spring of 1998 Imhof went to Europe in order to secure a place in a European football club. Relatives had arranged for him to take part in a training session at their local Swiss Second Division club FC Wil, after which Marcel Koller, the head coach, offered him his first professional contract. Two years later Imhof followed Koller to his next club, FC St. Gallen with whom he would win the Swiss Super League.

=== VfL Bochum ===
During the summer of 2005 Imhof followed coach Koller to a new club for the second time by joining German 2. Bundesliga club VfL Bochum. In 2006, after Imhof's first season with Bochum, the club was promoted to the Bundesliga. When Imhof's contract expired in 2007, Bochum was at first reluctant to offer him a new contract as Imhof had not seen consistent playing time during the previous season due to injury. However, as Bochum were unable to find an adequate replacement for Imhof, he was offered a new one-year contract. Ironically, Imhof appeared in the majority of matches for Bochum during the 2007–08 season, and following the season it was rumoured that clubs such as Middlesbrough F.C. of the English Premier League, and Celtic F.C. of the Scottish Premier League were interested in him.

=== Return to St. Gallen ===
On 14 January 2010, he announced his return to FC St. Gallen, leaving VfL Bochum and the Bundesliga after four and half years.

== International career ==
He made his debut for Canada in an October 2000 World Cup qualification match against Panama. As of November 2009, he has earned a total of 36 caps, scoring no goals. He has represented Canada in 13 FIFA World Cup qualification matches. He has also played at the 2001 Confederations Cup.

== Honours ==
St. Gallen

- Swiss Super League: 1999–2000
- Swiss Challenge League: 2011–12

VfL Bochum

- 2. Bundesliga: 2005–06

Canada

- CONCACAF Gold Cup: 3rd place, 2002
