= Dominic Imhof =

Canadian soccer player (born 1982)

Personal information
- Date of birth: July 28, 1982 (age 44)
- Place of birth: Grande Prairie, Alberta, Canada
- Height: 1.75 m (5 ft 9 in)
- Position: Midfielder

Youth career
- 1997–2000: BV United Smithers Gunners

Senior career*
Years	Team	Apps	(Gls)
2001–2003	FC St. Gallen U21		
2003–2006	FC Gossau	71	(5)
2008–2009	FC Tuggen	30	(4)
2009	FC Rapperswil-Jona	13	(0)
2010–2012	FC Tuggen	15	(1)
2012	FC Gossau	13	(0)

International career
2009	Canada	1	(0)
- * Club domestic league appearances and goals

Dominic Imhof (born July 28, 1982) is a Canadian former soccer player who played as a midfielder.

== Club career ==
Imhof began his career at BV United Smithers Gunners and moved in 2001 to St. Gallen to play for their youth and reserve teams. He moved in 2005 to FC Gossau played here his first seven games as a professional and signed in January 2008 with FC Tuggen. In summer 2009, he signed up with FC Rapperswil-Jona, before returning to FC Tuggen in January 2010.

== International career ==
Imhof earned his first call-up for Canada on 26 May 2009 and played his first senior national game on 30 May 2009 in a friendly game against Cyprus, he played two minutes.

== Position ==
He is variable defensive player and can play in the left or right midfield and as right defender.

== Personal life ==
Dominic is the younger brother of Daniel Imhof.
