= Henfenfeld Castle =

Burg Henfenfeld
- Pfinzingschloss
- Henfenfeld
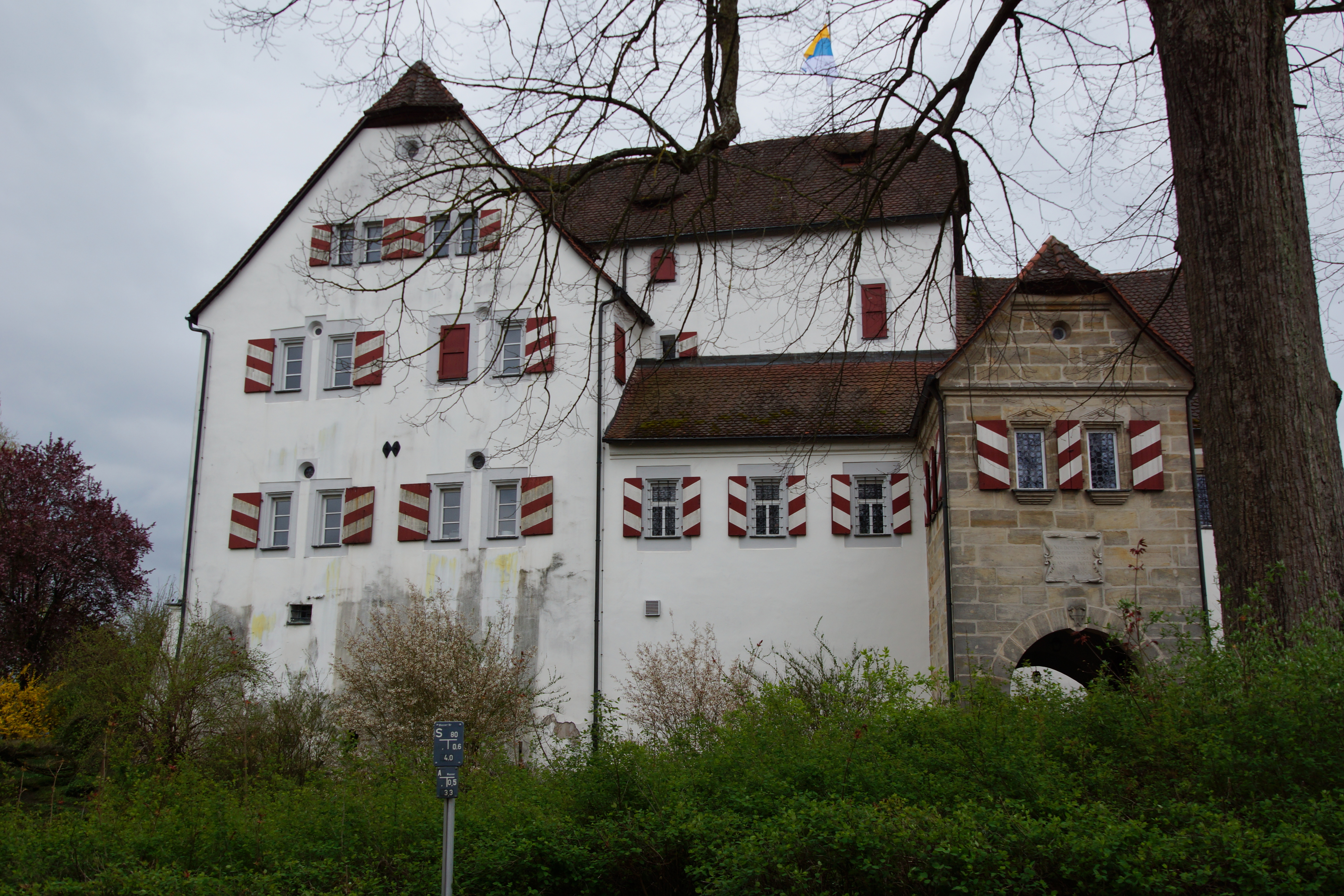
- Frontalansicht der Burg

Site information
- Type: hill castle
- Code: DE-BY
- Condition: preserved

Location
- Coordinates: 49°29′47″N 11°23′31″E
- Height: Height missing, see template documentation

Site history
- Built: um 1200
- Materials: Buckelquadermauerwerk

Garrison information
- Occupants: Reichsministeriale

The Henfenfeld Castle, also called Pfinzing Castle, is a Höhenburg in Henfenfeld in the Landkreis Nürnberger Land, Germany, which was built around 1200 in the Late Middle Ages Seat of various Reichsministerialer, until it came into the possession of the Pfinzings von Henfenfeld in 1530. The buildings of the well-preserved estate, which has been privately owned again since 1983, have essentially retained their 16th-century appearance, while the landscaped garden is a nationally significant example of early 19th-century horticultural art. Burg Henfenfeld is not to be confused with the Pfinzing Castle in Feucht.

== History ==
=== Feudalism ===
Around 1200 the castle was built and was initially owned by the ministerial dynasty of the von Henfenfelds. In the late 14th and early 15th centuries, the castle changed hands frequently until it passed to the Herren von Egloffstein from 1405 to 1530.

In 1530 Martin I Pfinzing acquired the castle. It thus passed into the possession of an old Nuremberg patrician family, after which it is occasionally called Pfinzing Castle to the present day. At the beginning of their landlordship, Henfenfeld was also caught up in the destruction of the Second Margraviate War and, like many other fortifications in Middle Franconia, was burned down in 1553 when Margravial troops invaded, whose partisan Hans von Egloffstein saw himself deprived of his property by the Pfinzings. The most famous family representative and lord of the castle was Paul Pfinzing (1554-1599). The Pfinzing von Henfenfeld contributed the castle to a family foundation (called Vorschickung in the Nuremberg patriciate), which was administered by the family elder. They remained the lords of the castle until the extinction of the main branch of the family in 1764, after which the administration fell to the brothers of the widow, a native of Haller von Hallerstein.

=== Aristocratic-bourgeois hybrid ===
Karl Benedikt Schwarz, a merchant from Nuremberg, acquired the landlordship in 1817, whereupon the Bavarian King ennobled him to exercise it. He administered his estates in a newly established Fideicommissum, "whose property rights did not expire until the legal abolition of the Fideikommisse in 1919." The foundation estates were then divided between the brothers Paul August Benedikt von Schwarz, who received Artelshofen, and Benedikt Gottlieb, who took over Henfenfeld. During the 135 years that the Schwarz family was lords of Henfenfeld, the estate underwent many renovations and remodeling, especially between 1826 and 1838, turning the Baroque garden into a contemporary landscape garden.

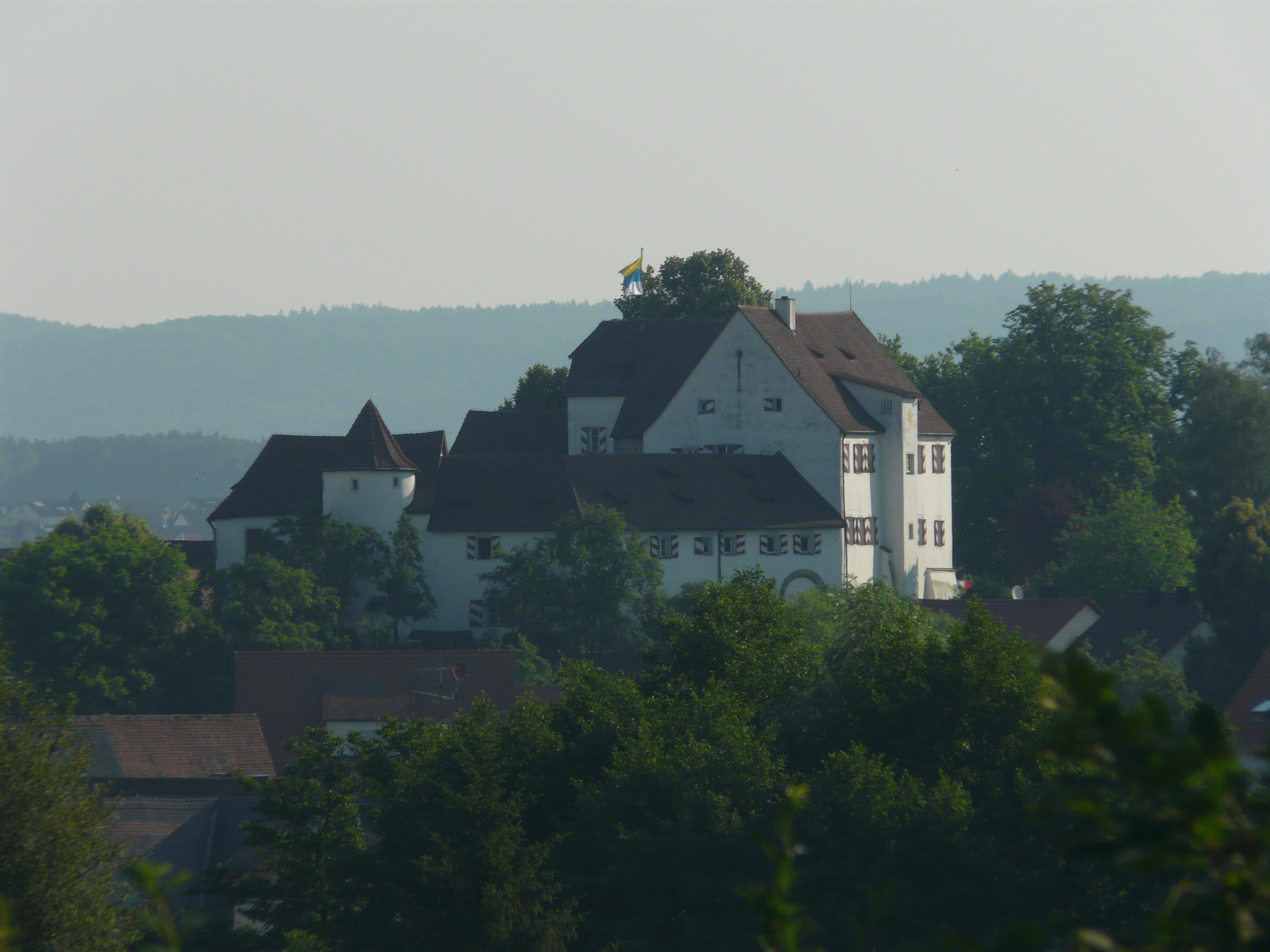
The 2008 plant in its natural setting.

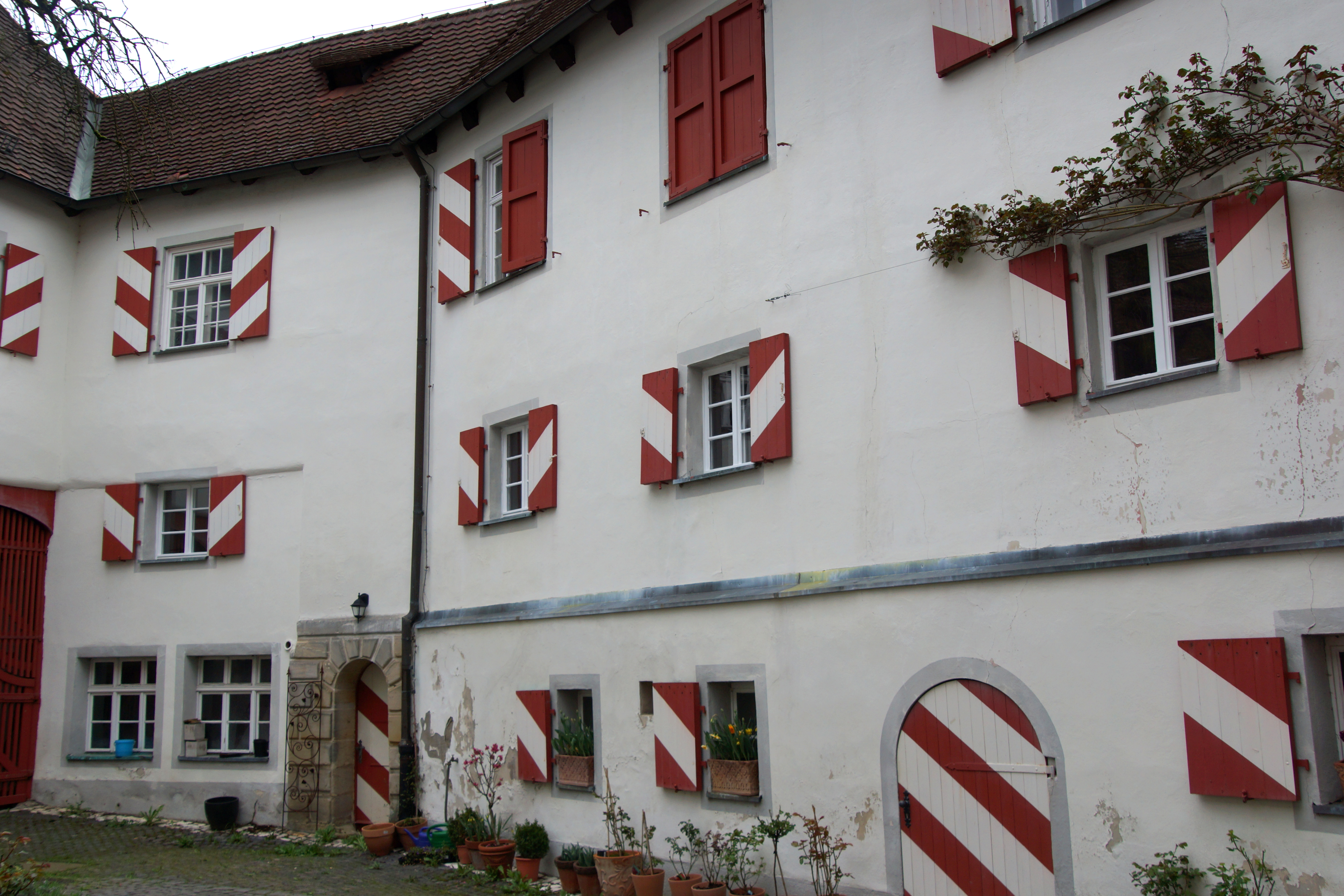
Innenhof

=== Civil society ===
In the 1920s, the von Schwarz family ran a catering business on the upper floor and, as early as 1929, gave rooms to the NS-Lehrerbund for training purposes. In 1939, a camp for the female Reich Labor Service was established at the castle.

With the purchase by the Deutsche Bundesbahn in 1952 the era of the von Schwarz on Henfenfeld ended. Until its reprivatization in 1983, classes of a federal railway school were held in the buildings. Subsequently, mainly business premises were housed in the facility. In the meantime, it was used again under public law from 1989 to 1995 as a transition camp for ethnic German immigrants.

In the 21st century, Pfinzingschloss has been in private commercial use throughout. The current owner Denette Whitter runs an opera academy in the castle and uses the premises, among other things, for cultural events. To entertain guests, a catering business is run on the first floor.

The current condition of the well-preserved castle largely corresponds to the original appearance of the 16th century plus the castle park newly created in the early 19th century, which is "from a garden monument preservation point of view of great supra-regional importance", of tourist as well as cultural interest.

== See also ==
- Pfinzing Castle
- Pfinzing von Henfenfeld
