= Hallerstein =

Hallerstein is a surname. Notable people with the surname include:

- Noble bavarian familie Haller von Hallerstein:
  - Carl Haller von Hallerstein (1774–1817), German architect, archaeologist and art historian
  - Ferdinand Augustin Hallerstein (1703–1774), Slovene Jesuit missionary in China
  - Ruprecht Haller von Hallerstein (1533-1560), Bavarian noble lord

== Other uses ==
- 15071 Hallerstein (1999 BN12) is a Main-belt Asteroid
