= Pfinzing Castle =

Manor house in Germany

Coordinates: 49.3752°N 11.2117°E

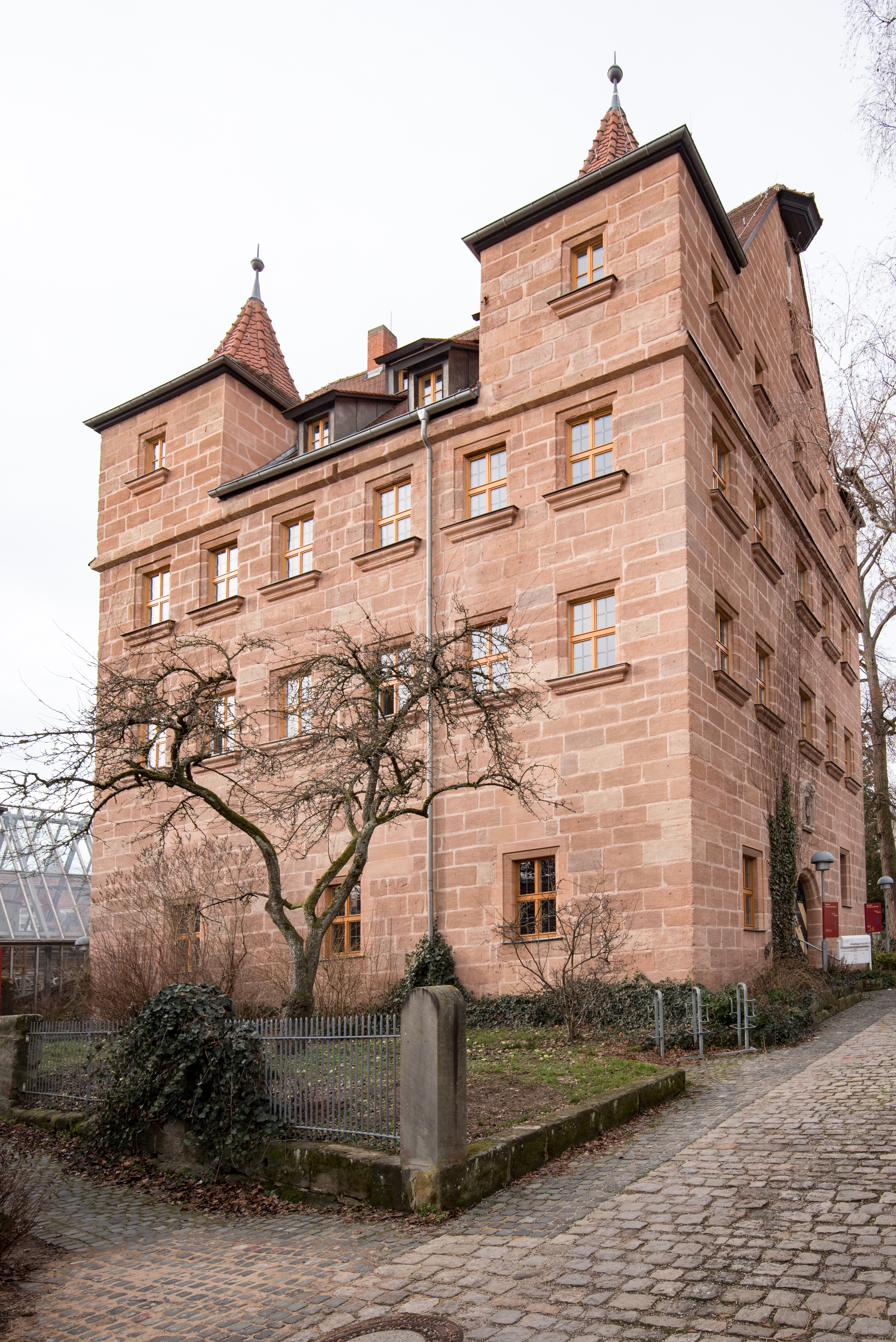
Pfinzing Castle

Pfinzing Castle or Mornek Castle is one of three preserved castles of the Nuremberg patriciate in Feucht, along with the Tucherschloss and the Zeidlerschloss. The Castle has been owned and used by the market town of Feucht since 1988. Concerts and art exhibitions are held in the entrance hall.

== History ==
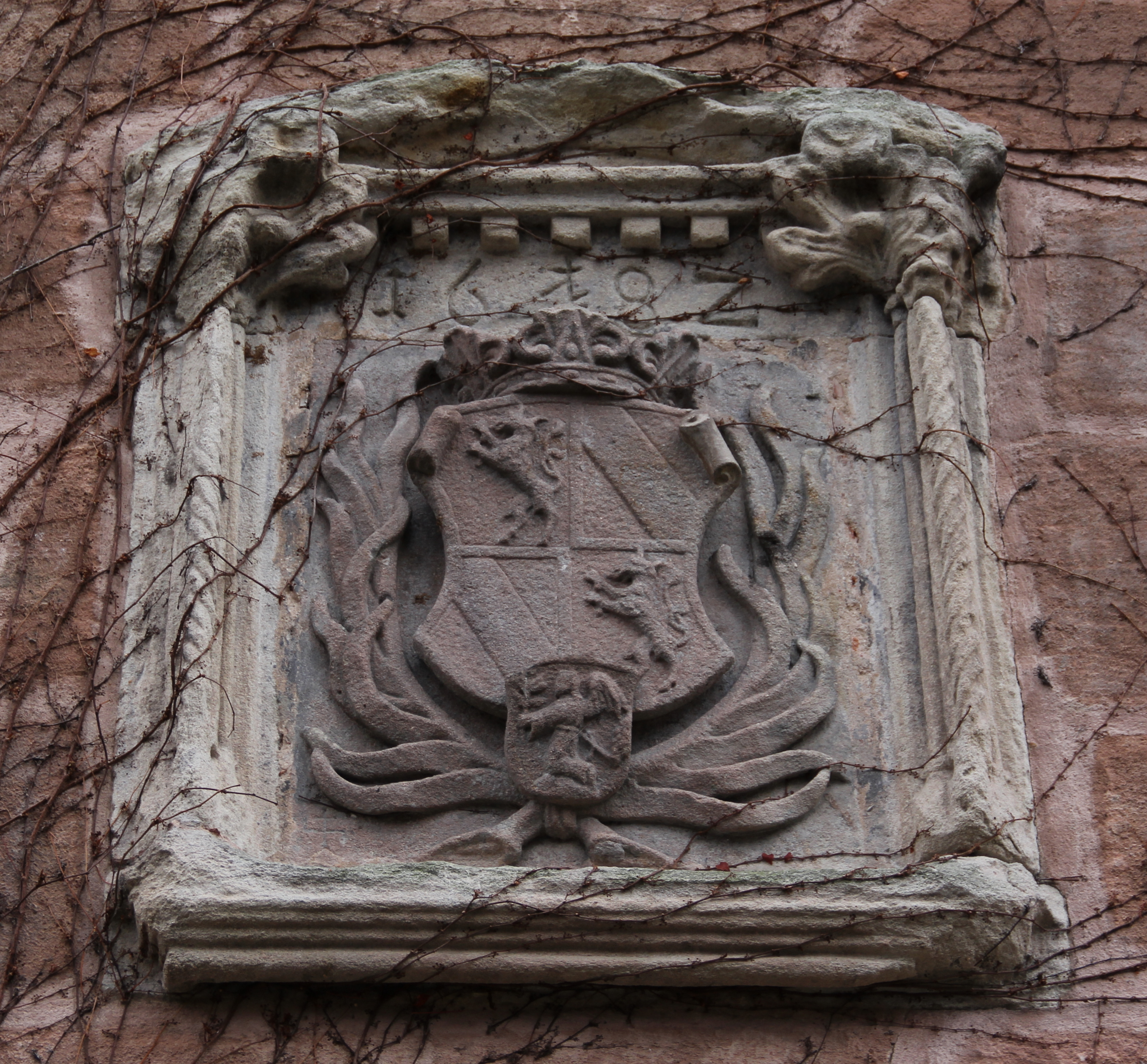
Scheurl coat of arms

Although local historians have suspected a ministerial seat at this location as early as the 13th century, the Pfinzing Castle has only been proven since the 15th century. In 1469, the estate of Ludwig Pfinzing was mentioned when he sold his Feuchter estates to the imperial city of Nuremberg. The Nuremberg patrician had acquired the estates through his marriage to a Waldstromer woman in 1455. The Waldstrom family, which for a time held the imperial forester's dignity, had already acquired several Feuchter estates in the 14th century.

Soon after its acquisition, the Nuremberg council sold the manor house to the council consul Dr. Sebald Müller, who owned it until his death in 1495. Under his descendants, the Pfinzing Castle together with the village of Feucht became a victim of the War of the Succession of Landshut in 1504. It was not until shortly before 1520 that Gabriel Nützel, who also inherited the "Castle in the Carthusian Pond", acquired the burnt ruins, but ceded them to a Bernhard Glotz. The new owner must have begun rebuilding soon after his purchase: in 1521 there is already talk of "Glotz's newly built house and manor". But already in 1530 it was sold to the Nuremberg citizen Hanns Pfann and his stepson Christof Mordeisen and only shortly after to Kaspar Koberger.

Koberger experienced the second destruction of the seat in the Second Margrave War on May 16, 1552. In 1557 Koberger asked the council to be allowed to sell the "Burgstall" with the ruins of the fire. The buyer was the patrician Georg Tetzel, born in 1529, who married in 1558 and apparently carried out the reconstruction of the Pfinzing Castle in the following decade. The date 1568 on a coat of arms on the first floor probably documents the completion of the building project.

In 1585 Georg Tetzel sold the new castle to Anton Pfann and Alexander Rosenthaler, apparently property speculators, who sold it in 1586 to the merchant Eustachius Unterholzer. He later bequeathed it to his son of the same name, who was followed in 1616 by his grandson Tobias Unterholzer. During the Thirty Years' War he repeatedly had to put up with the manor house being occupied, looted and the furnishings demolished. After the death of Tobias Unterholzer, the guardians of his still minor son sold the seat in 1650 to Friedrich Otto Freiherr von Herberstein, who as a Protestant had been forced to leave his native Carinthia. However, the baron was in such difficult economic circumstances that he largely owed the purchase price. The estate therefore reverted to the Unterholzer family after some legal wrangling.

In 1677, the imperial city of Nuremberg bought the manor again after Eustachius Karl Unterholzer was unable to find a buyer from Nuremberg. In 1682, councilor Dr. Christoph Gottlieb Scheurl von Defersdorf took over the property. He had two towers of the defensive wall, the one on Steingasse and the rear one on Schlosswiese, demolished. At that time, there was also a gardener's house and a gatehouse near the manor house, as well as various agricultural outbuildings. In 1712, small sheds for storing tobacco and fodder were built on the ground of the two former wall towers.

After the councilor's demise, Christoph Gottlieb Scheurl the Younger followed in 1713, Karl Wilhelm in 1764 and again a Christoph Gottlieb Scheurl von Defersdorf in 1793. At that time the name "Schloss Mornek" had already appeared for the seat. According to the research of Wilhelm Schwemmer, two contradictory explanations of the origin of the younger castle name were in circulation: On the one hand, Georg Tetzel is said to have named his new building Schloss Mornek, while according to another tale, a Bohemian merchant Morne once lived in the castle.

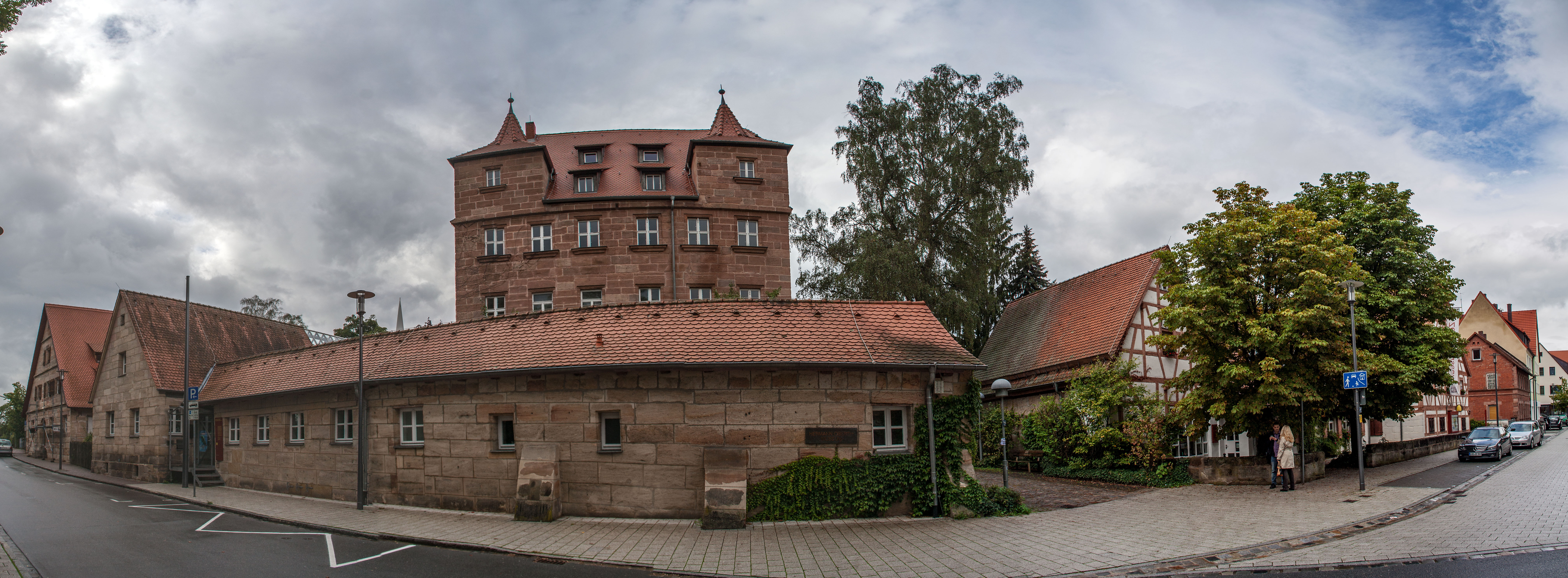
Pfinzing Castle, Panoramablick, September 2013

The seat remained with the family until the death of Christoph Gottlieb Scheurl in 1823. Then it passed to his daughter, who had married the post office expeditor David Friedrich Wild, and shortly thereafter to the grandson Gottlieb Friedrich Wild, who sold the manor to Magdalena Schwemmer in 1847. Several speculative changes of ownership followed until Georg Konrad and Barbara Elise Schmidt acquired the estate in 1876. Their daughter Helena and son-in-law Friedrich Scherrbacher took it over in 1887 and set up a small factory in the castle. Around 1900, however, Scherrbacher had to file for bankruptcy, and through forced sale the Nuremberg stucco business Otto Schier acquired the property. The company soon traded the mansion away for a Nuremberg property, and again numerous changes of ownership followed. In 1943, the space pioneer Hermann Oberth acquired the mansion. In 1988 it was sold to the market town of Feucht, which immediately had a renovation carried out.

The manor house built by Georg Tetzel has enclosures made of sandstone ashlars. On the first floor in the early modern period there was a large cobbled hall, a dairy and a fruit vault. On the second floor were two parlors and two chambers and a kitchen, another hall was located with a large Soller (forecourt) and two chambers on the second floor. Above the entrance to the house on the inner side, two coats of arms with the date 1568 commemorate the builder Georg Tetzel, his first wife Barbara Fütterer and the second, Magdalena Pfinzing. In 1682, the walled courtyard still contained a one-story house for the gatekeeper, a well, a two-story outbuilding with apartments, a garden house, the castle stables and the stables.

From 1943 to 1988, the castle belonged to the Oberth family. During Hermann Oberth's lifetime, the first floor of the castle already housed a Hermann Oberth Space Museum, which is now located in an outbuilding.

== See also ==
- Henfenfeld Castle
- Pfinzing von Henfenfeld
