= Haller von Hallerstein =

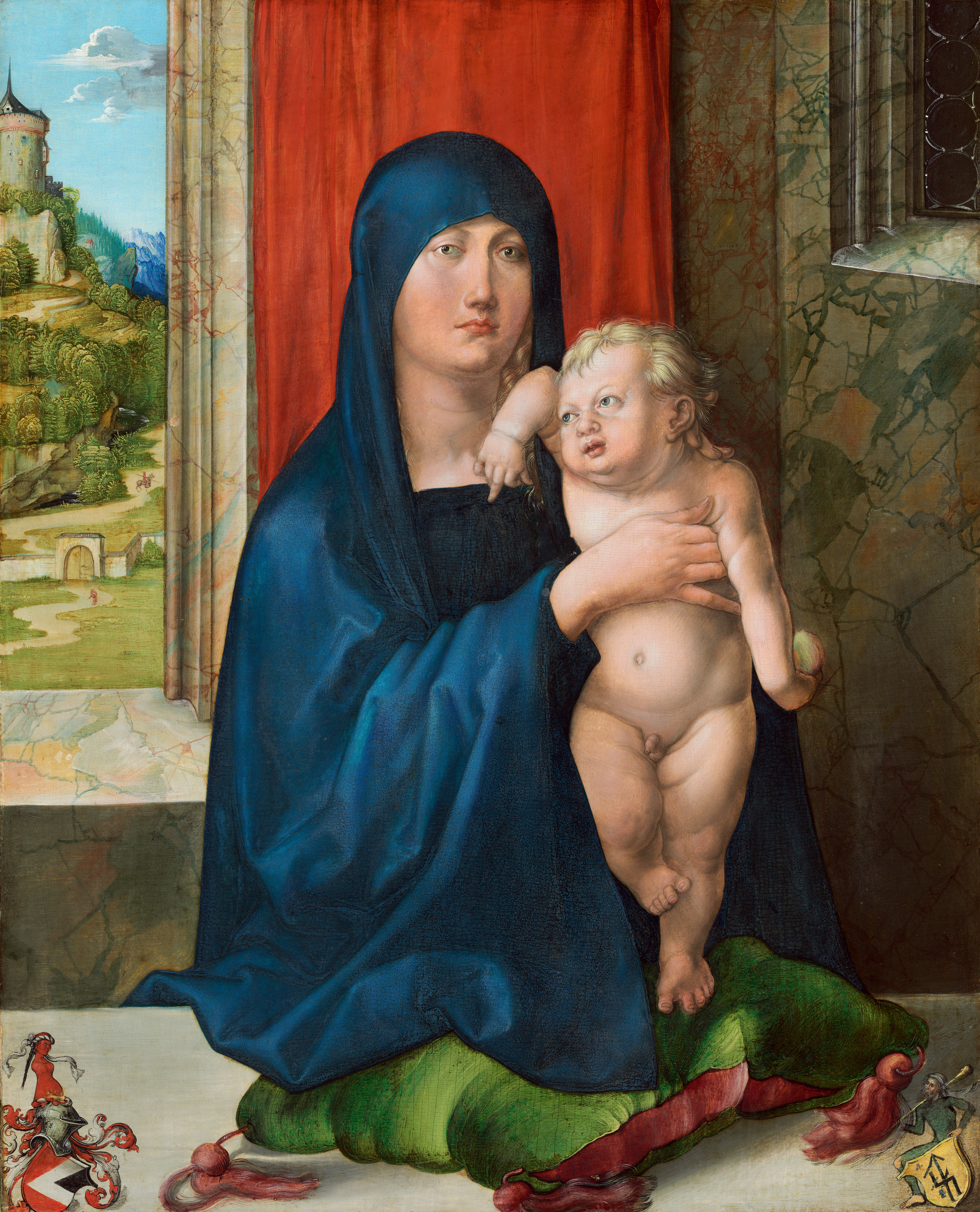
Haller Madonna, by Albrecht Dürer, c. 1496

Haller von Hallerstein is a noble patrician family from the Free Imperial City of Nuremberg which belonged to the wealthy ruling oligarchy during Nuremberg's Golden Age in the Late Middle Ages and the Renaissance.

Around 1500 a branch became Hungarian and played an important part in the history of Transylvania during the 16th to 18th centuries. They are not related with the patrician von Haller family from Bern, Switzerland.

== History ==
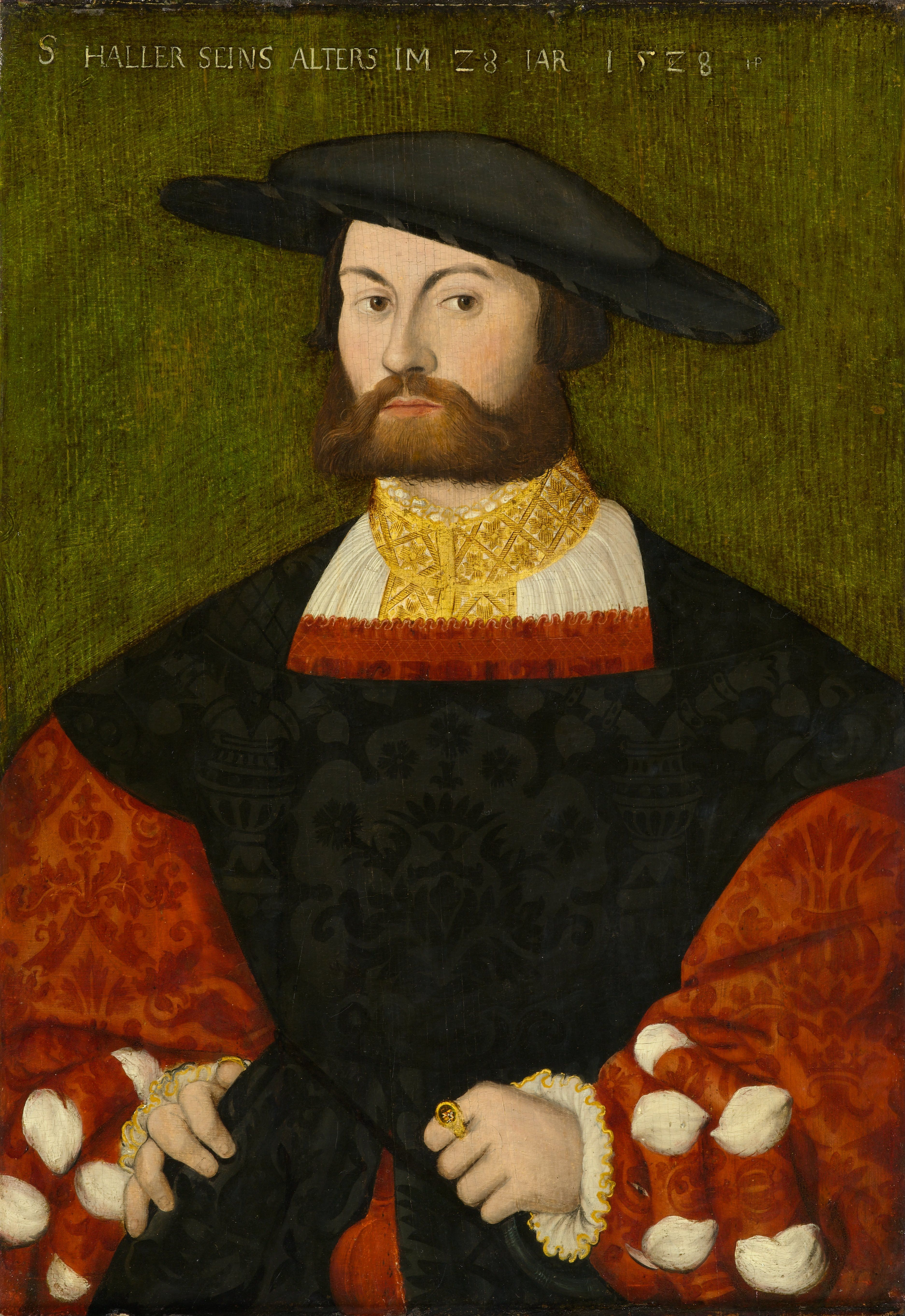
Portrait of Sebald Haller von Hallerstein, 1528, by Hans Brosamer

Throughout the 15th and 16th centuries the family's economic and political power contributed to the cultural development of the city. As early as the 14th century, the family belonged to the circle of families that had an exclusive access to the Inner Council of Nürnberg, to which the family sent representatives until 1806. According to the dance statute they were one of the twenty old lines eligible to participate in city council. In 1360, Berthold Haller donated the pilgrim hospital of the Holy Cross to the city. The Hallers made their fortune in the long-distance trade with Cologne, Lyon, Bologna and Venice, but also with Austria and Hungary, as well as in mining and banking. They increased it through inheritances enabled by skillful marriage policy. They married into other important patrician families such as the Tucher or Imhoff family. With Ruprecht I († 1489), Martin III († 1617) and Johann Siegmund († 1805) they provided three major officials to the free imperial city.

The family received an imperial confirmation of their nobility in 1433. In the second half of the 15th century, a branch split from the Nuremberg family and moved to Hungary and Transylvania, later to become Austrian counts. The Nuremberg branch became Lutheran during the reformation, like all major Nuremberg families. They were raised to the rank of barons in 1790. The family owned numerous estates and manor houses around Nuremberg. Since 1766 to this day the family seat is Großgründlach Castle, in the northern outskirts of Nürnberg.

In August 1796, Colonel Johann Georg Haller von Hallerstein succeeded in evacuating the Imperial Regalia, the crown jewels of the Holy Roman Empire, that had been preserved in Nuremberg ever since 1424, from French troops invading Germany during the War of the First Coalition, to Regensburg, and further on to Prague, from where they were brought to Vienna where they remain to this day.

== Members ==
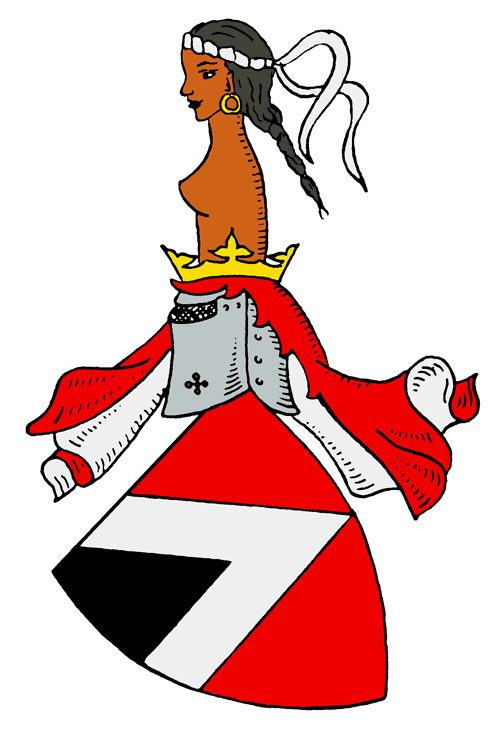
Coat of arms

- Ulrich Haller (c. 1255–1324/5), Consul of Nuremberg
- Bertold Haller (?–1379), Financier of Emperor Charles IV
- Wilhelm Haller von Hallerstein (d. 1504), advisor to Charles the Bold, Duke of Burgundy
- Ruprecht (II) Haller (1452–1513), founder of the Hungarian branch (Haller de Hallerkeö) – counts since 1713/53
- Bartholomäus Haller von Hallerstein (1486–1551), Imperial mayor (German: Reichsschultheiss) of Frankfurt, secretary to Mary of Hungary (governor of the Netherlands)
- Wilhelm Haller von Hallerstein (1478–1534), astronomer
- Hieronymus Haller (?–1519), friend of Konrad Celtis, paymaster of Emperor Charles V
- Wolf Haller von Hallerstein (1492–1559), Privy Councilor of Emperor Charles V
- Sebald Haller von Hallerstein (1500–1558), Privy Councilor of Emperor Charles V
- Christoph Haller von Hallerstein (?–1581), Privy Councilor of Emperor Charles V, lord of Ziegelstein castle
- Reichard Haller von Hallerstein SJ (1551–1622), Jesuit, confessor of Philip III of Spain
- Stephan (István) count Haller von Hallerstein (Hallerkö) (16xx–1710), governor of Transsilvania (1709/10)
- Ferdinand Augustin Hallerstein (1703–1774), from the Hungarian branch, also known as August Allerstein or by his Chinese name Liu Songling (simplified Chinese: 刘松龄; traditional Chinese: 劉松齡; pinyin: Liú Sōnglíng), was a Jesuit missionary and astronomer from Carniola (then Habsburg Monarchy, now Slovenia). He was active in 18th century China and spent 35 years at the imperial court of the Qianlong Emperor as the Head of the Imperial Astronomical Bureau and Board of Mathematics.
- Carl Haller von Hallerstein (1774–1817), German architect, archaeologist and art historian who led excavations in Greece
- Benedictus Haller von Hallerstein, OCist, (1620-1698), monk in St. Bernard's Abbey, Hemiksem, Mysticus.
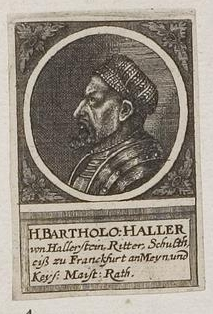
Bartholomäus Haller von Hallerstein (1486–1551), Imperial mayor of Frankfurt, secretary to Mary of Hungary

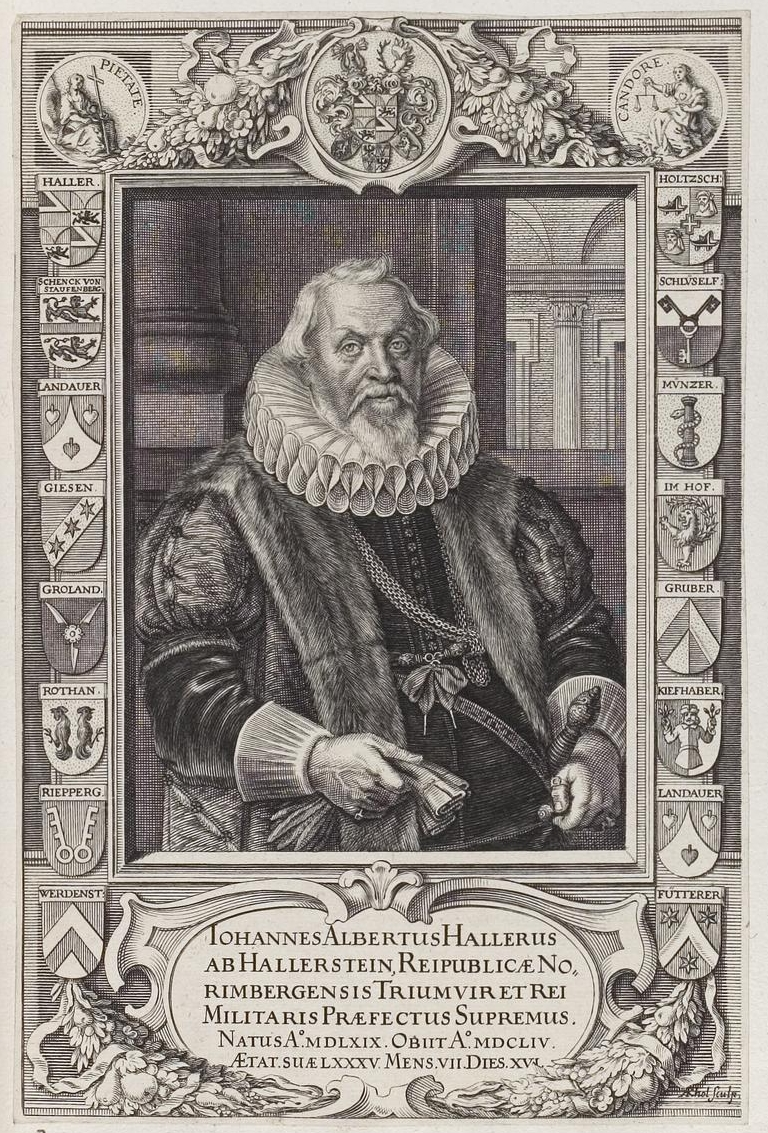
Johann Albrecht Haller von Hallerstein (1569–1654), Senator of Nuremberg

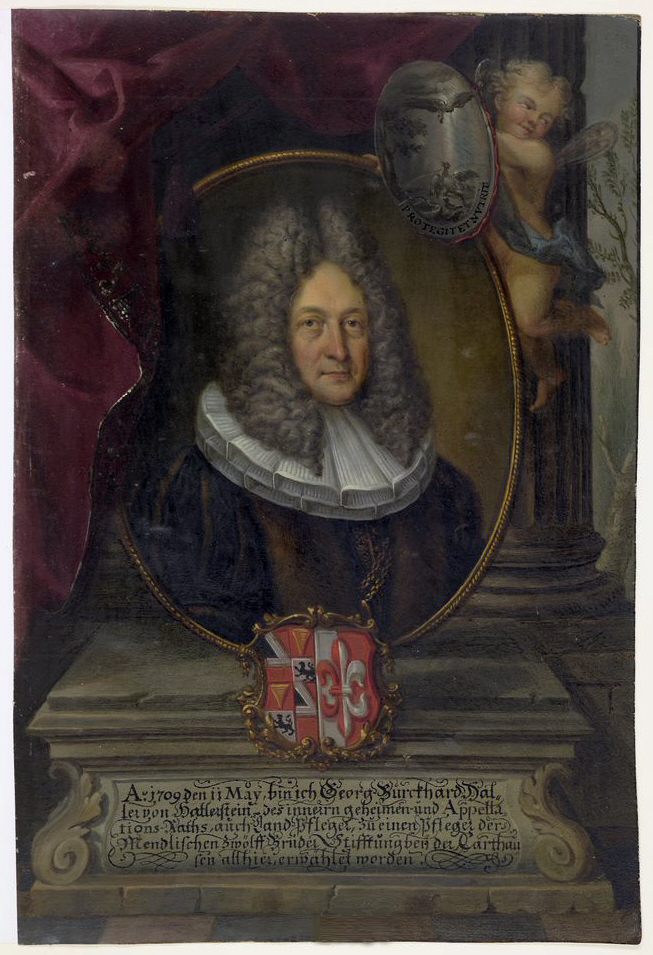
Georg Burckhard Haller von Hallerstein, (1658–1711), Mayor of Nuremberg

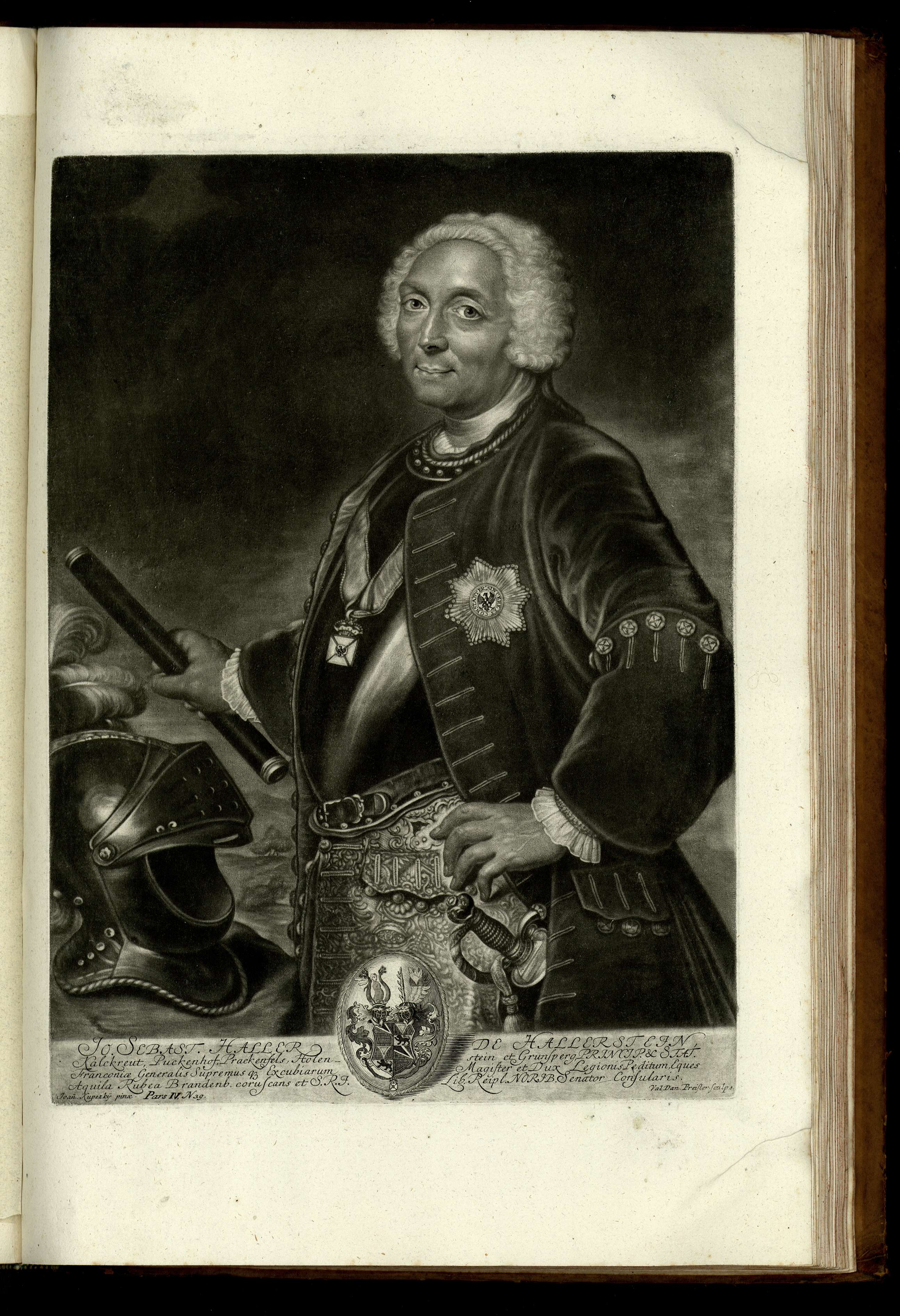
Johann Sebastian Haller von Hallerstein (1684–1745), field marshal of the Franconian Circle

=== Properties around Nuremberg ===
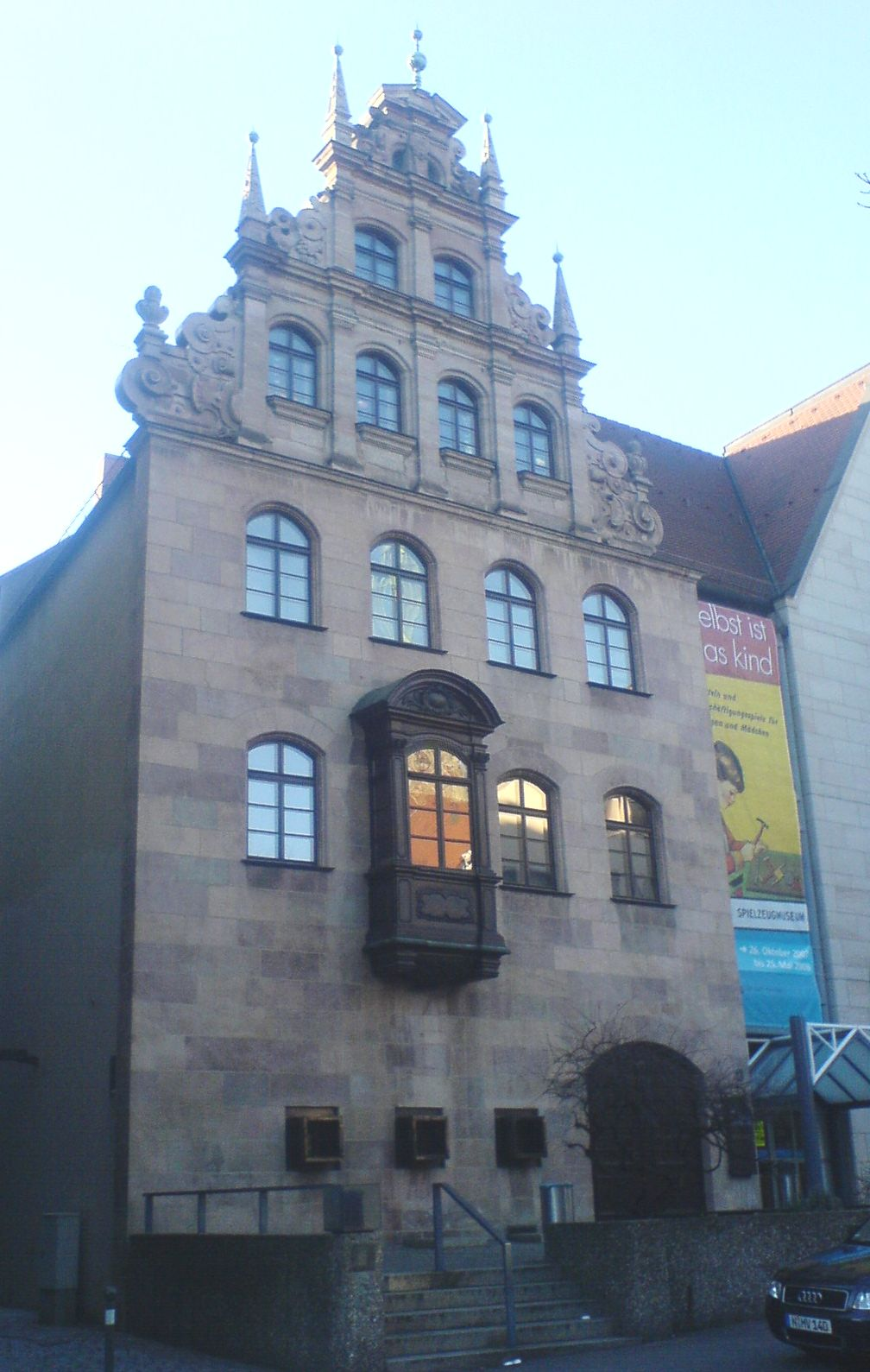
Haller House in Nuremberg

The main seat and commercial center of the family was the Haller House in Nuremberg, Karl Street 13–15 (today a toy museum). The only mansion still owned by the family is Grossgründlach Castle north of Nuremberg, a residence of the barons Haller since 1766 when they inherited it from the patrician family Pfinzing.

However, over the centuries the family acquired about four dozen estates, mostly with castles or manor houses, around their home town. Between 1337 and 1500 they were the lords of Gräfenberg where alone they built four manor houses. From 1365 until 1540 they owned Malmsbach castle near Schwaig and between 1370 and 1647 Ziegelstein Castle (a neighborhood in the north-eastern outskirts of Nuremberg, with a castle destroyed in 1642). Some of the longest held properties were Kalchreuth (1395–1850) and Puckenhof (at Buckenhof, 1462–1848). In Mögeldorf, an eastern quarter of Nuremberg, they had two houses, the medieval tower house called Hallerschloss (1555–1652) and the Cnopfsches Schloss (1550–1571).

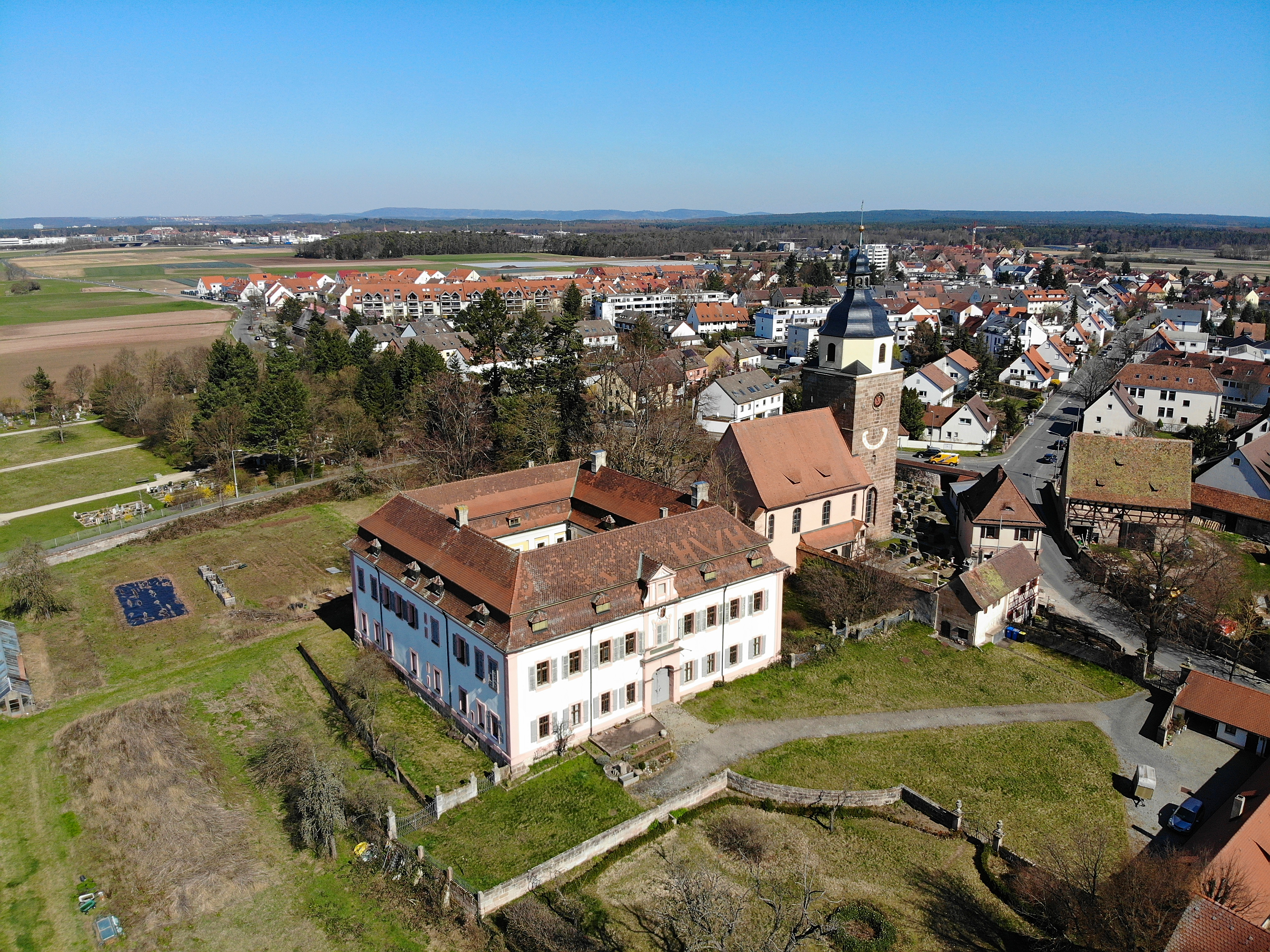
Grossgründlach Castle

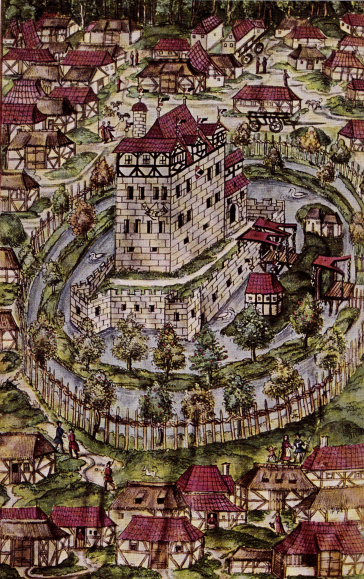
Ziegelstein Castle

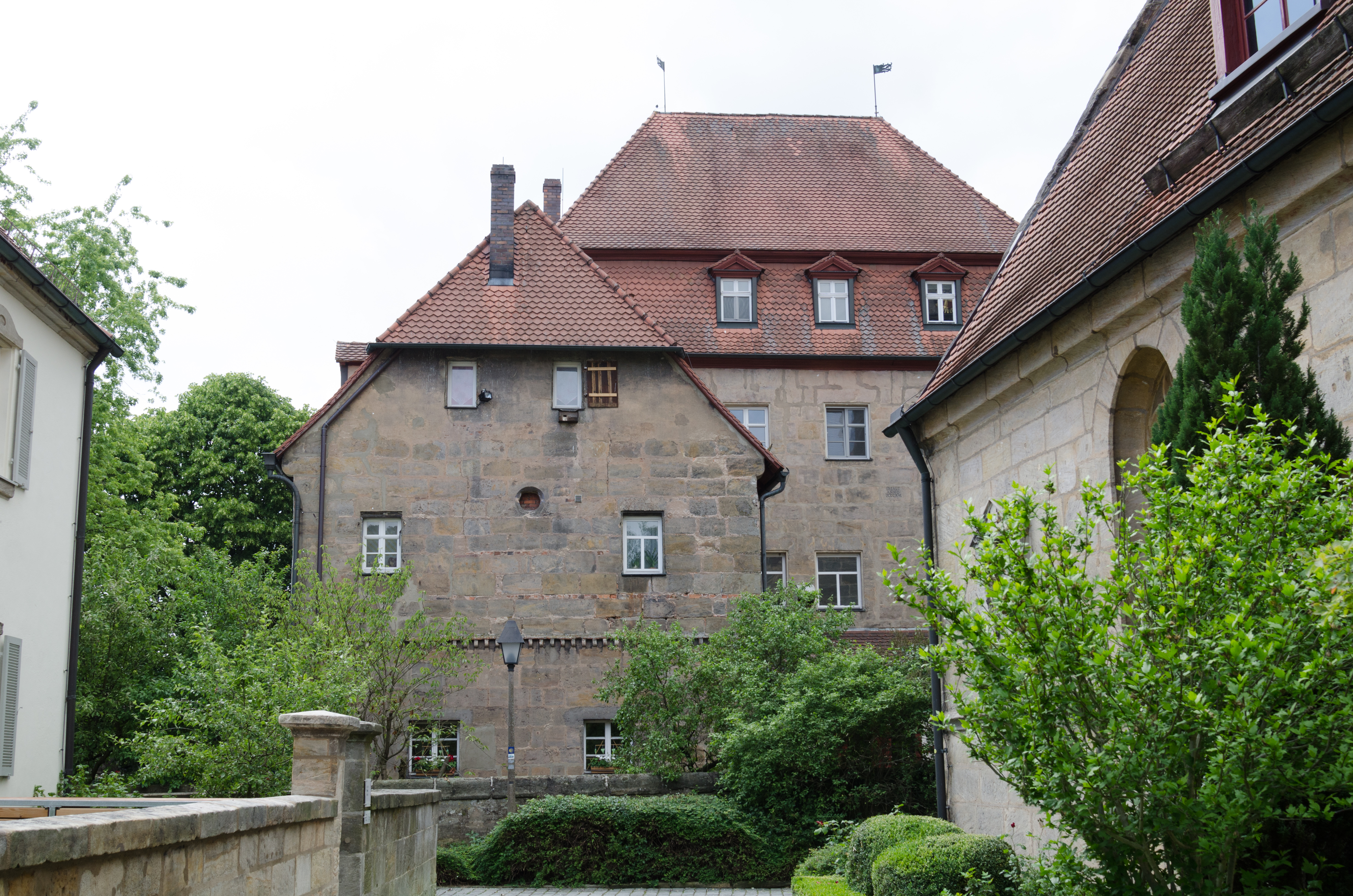
Kalchreuth Castle

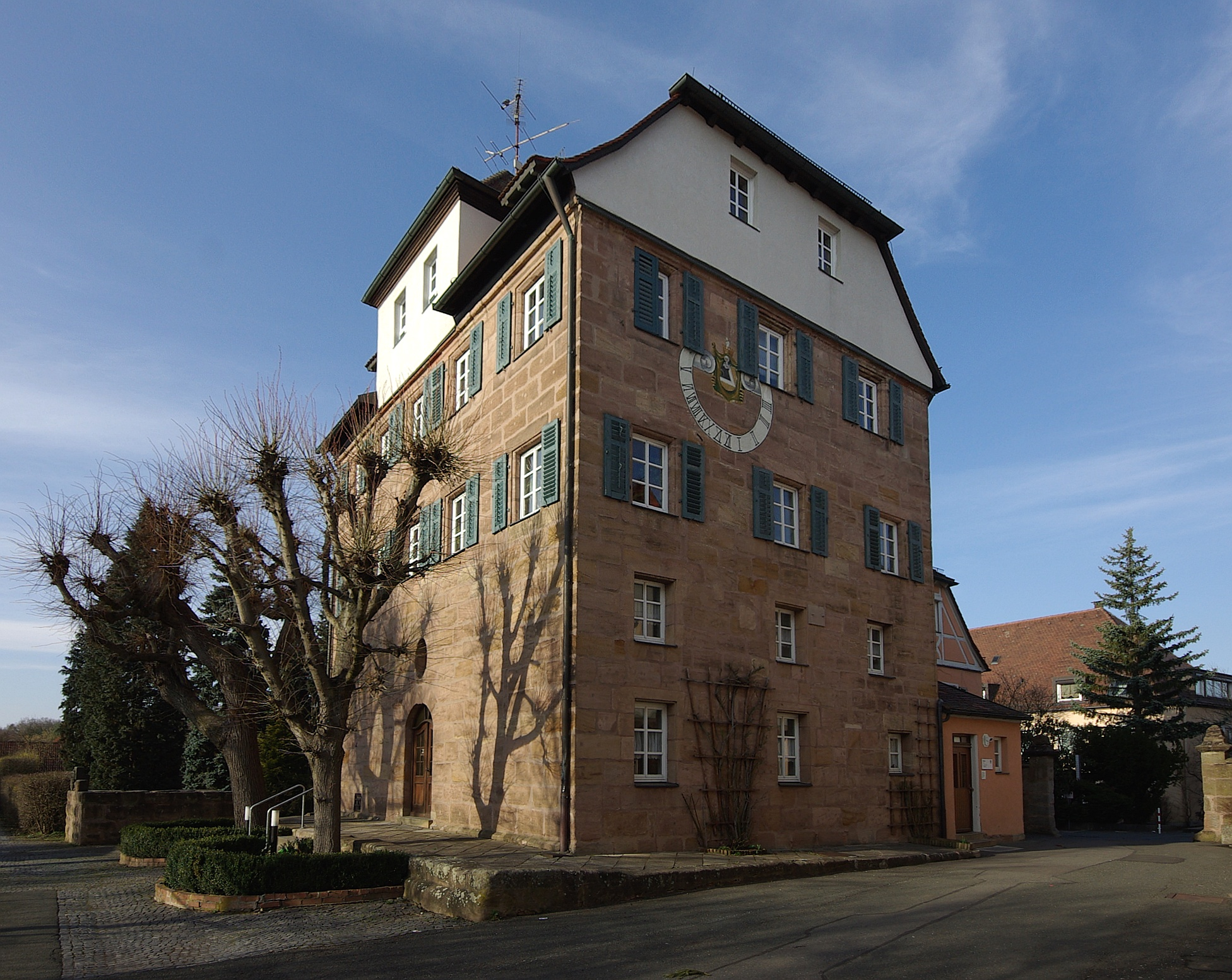
Buckenhof Castle

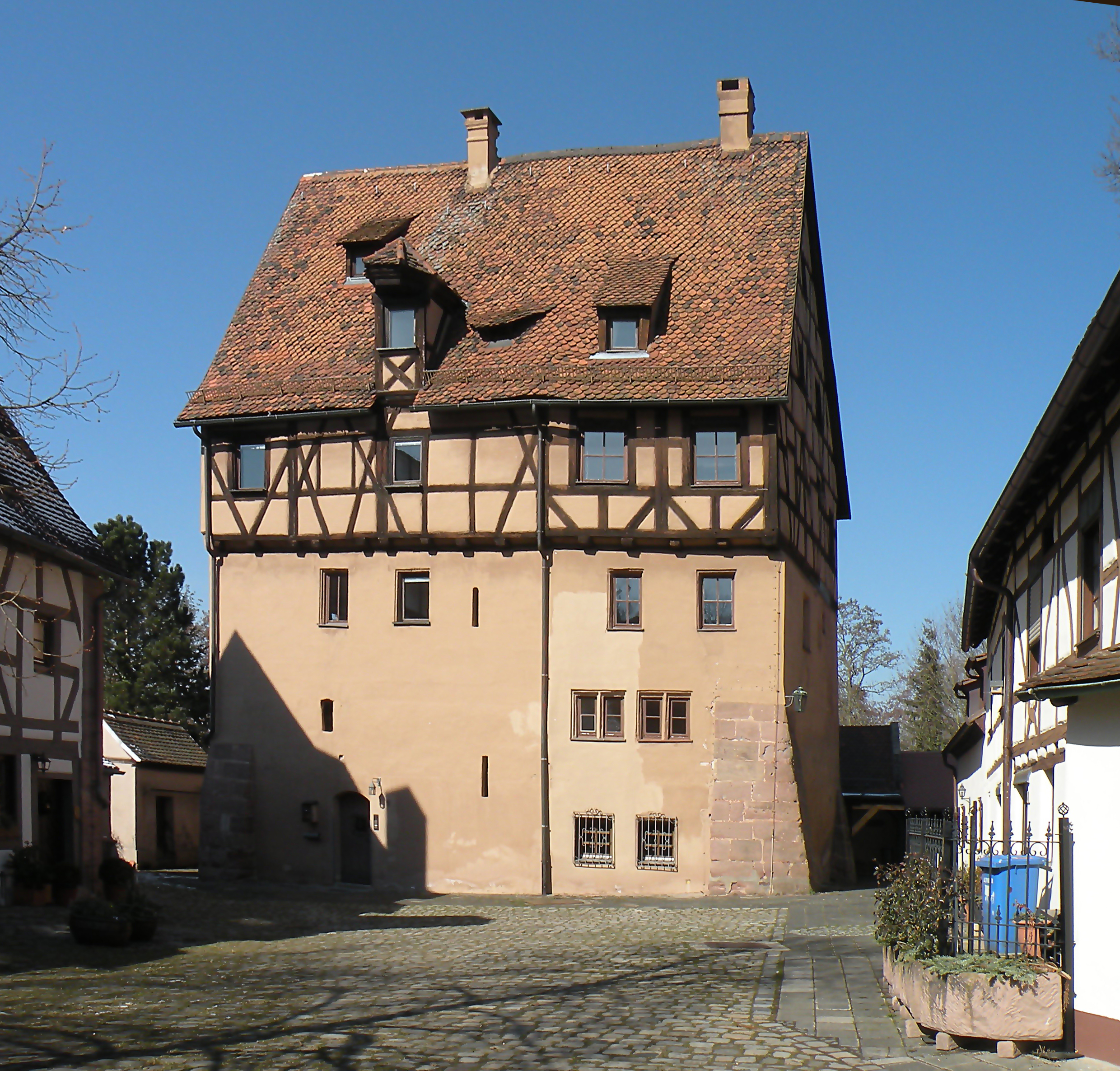
Hallerschloss in Mögeldorf, Nuremberg

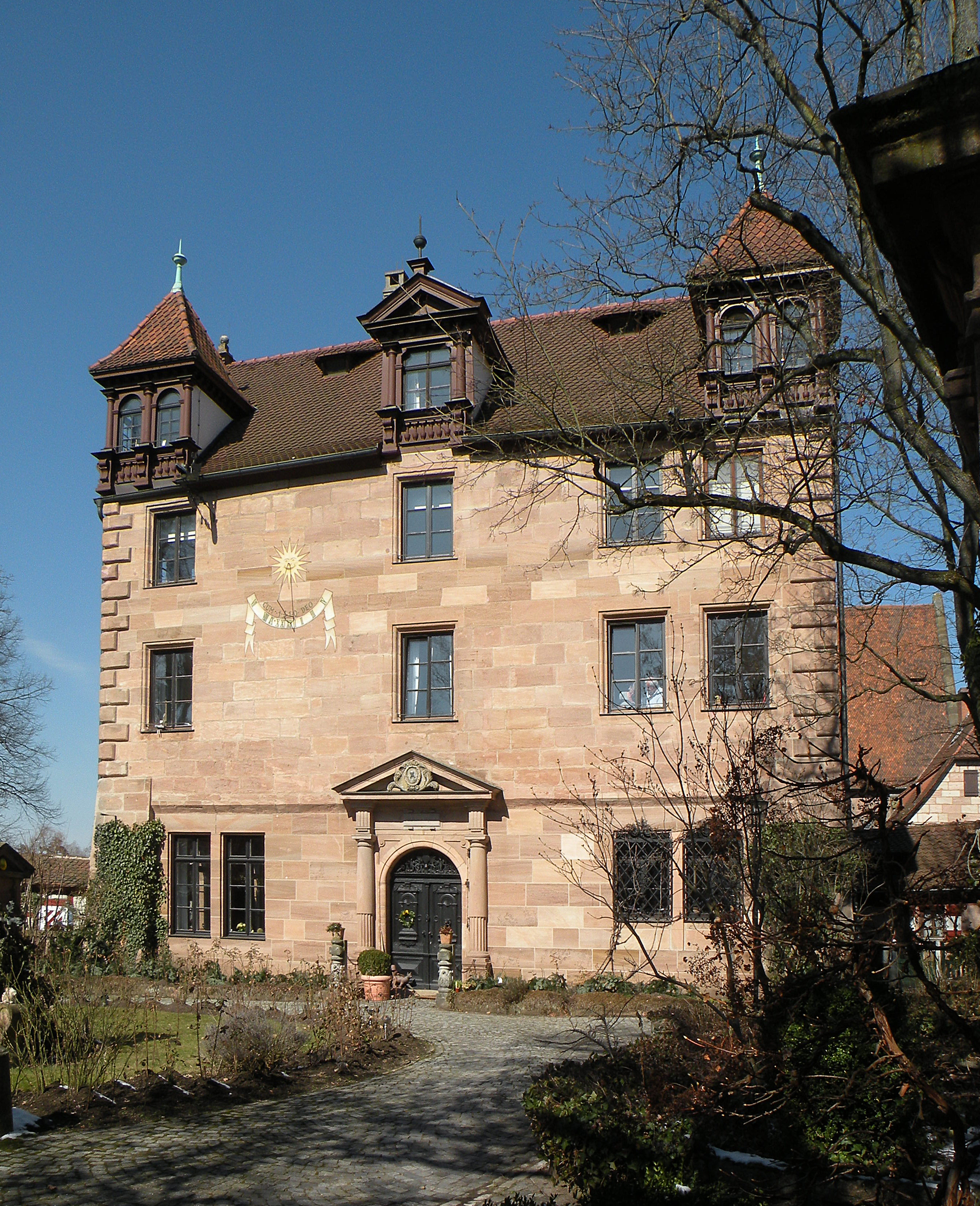
Cnopf’sches or Linck’sches Schloss

=== Branch of Ziegelstein ===
1. Paulus Haller zu Ziegelstein, died 1474: founder of the Paulinian branch.
  1. Erasmus Haller zu Ziegelstein; died 1501.
    1. Sebald Haller von Hallerstein, died 1578, imperial councillor of Charles V, diplomat. Married in 1528 to Maria im Hoff.

=== Bavarian Branch ===
Ruprecht I Haller von Hallerstein, born 1419, descendants:

1. Wolf II Haller von Hallerstein, (1492-1559): Imperial counselor. married to Elisabeth van Logenhagen.
  1. Maria Haller von Hallerstein, 1538
  2. Johanna Haller von Hallerstein, 1539
  3. Louisa Haller von Hallerstein, 1540: Abbes of Soleilmont abbey.
  4. Carl Haller von Hallerstein, 1542
  5. Isabella Haller von Hallerstein, 1544
  6. Philipp Haller von Hallerstein, 1550
2. Bartholomeus Haller von Hallerstein, (1486-1551), Imperial mayor of Frankfurt, secretary to queen Mary of Hungary (governor of the Netherlands).
  1. Christoph Haller von Hallerstein zu Zieglstein, died 1581.
  2. Wolf III Haller von Hallerstein, died 1571.
  3. Ruprecht Haller von Hallerstein, born 1533.
    1. Ludwig Haller von Hallerstein, born 1550: friend of Ortelius

=== Images ===
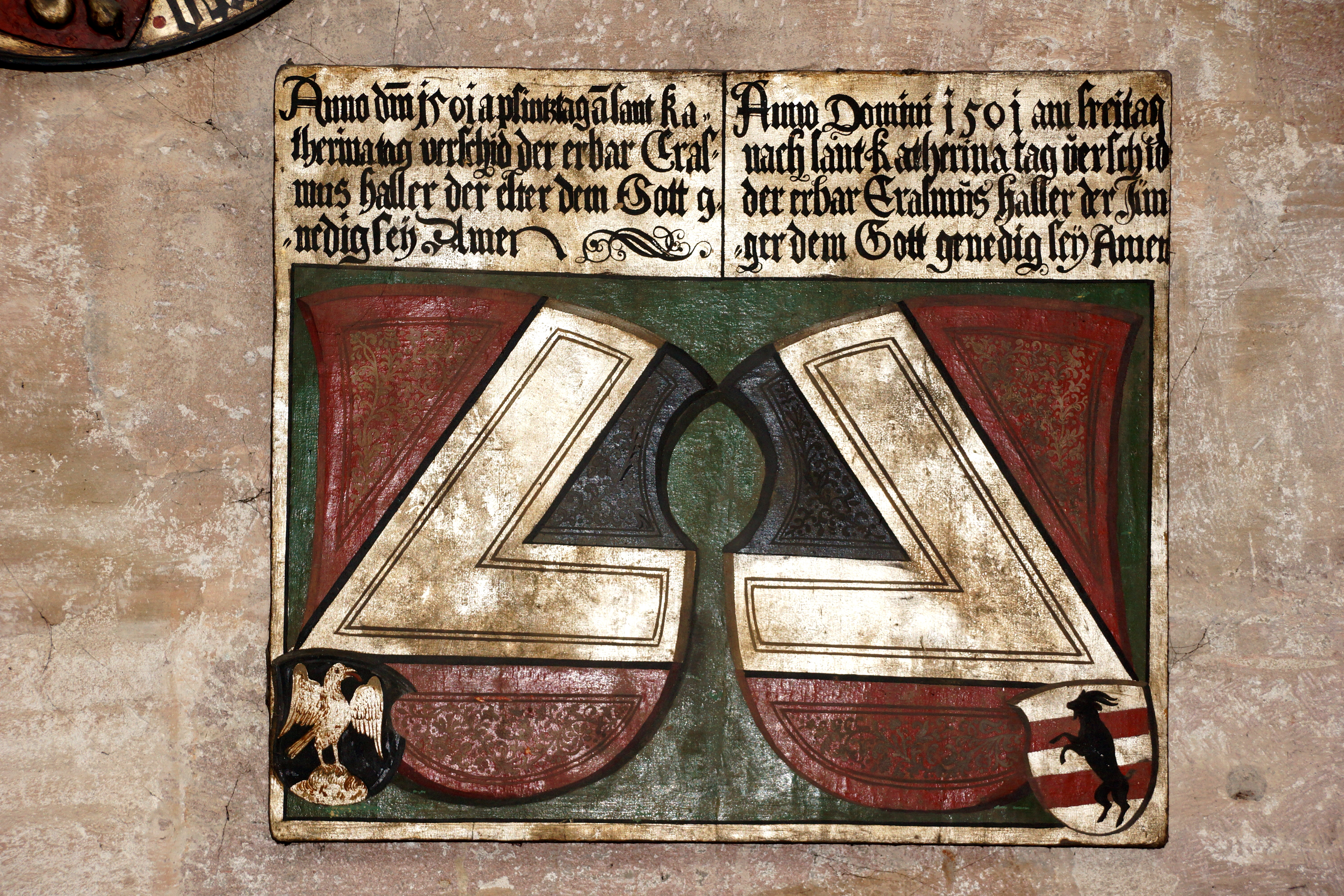
Epitaph of Erasmus Haller the Elder and the Younger, 1501 in St. Sebaldus Church, Nuremberg

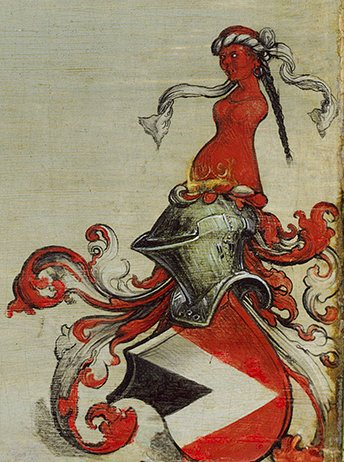
Coat of arms by Durer on the Haller Madonna

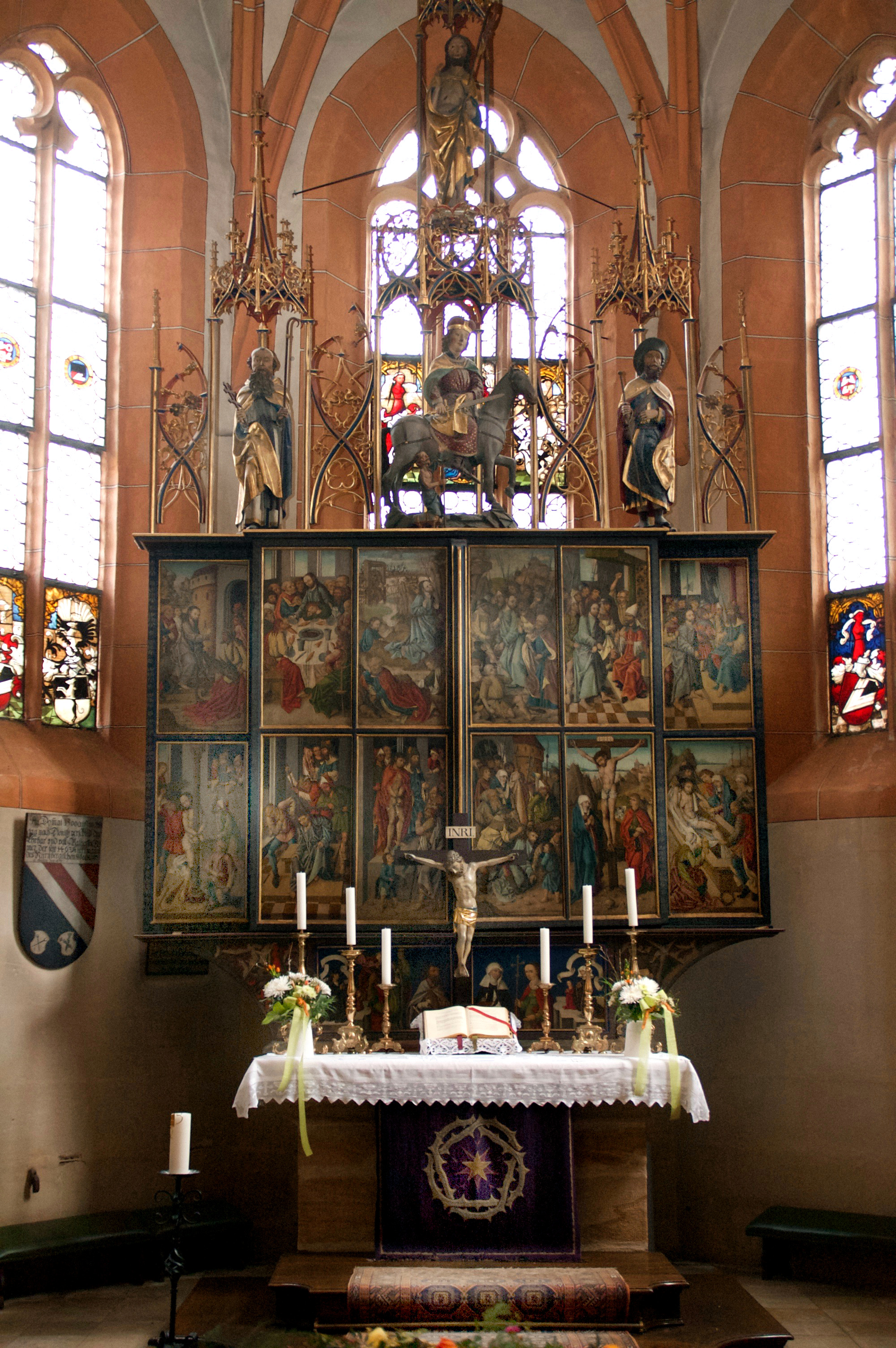
Altar by Durer's teacher Michael Wolgemut, in St Andrew's, Kalchreuth, donated by the Haller family in 1498

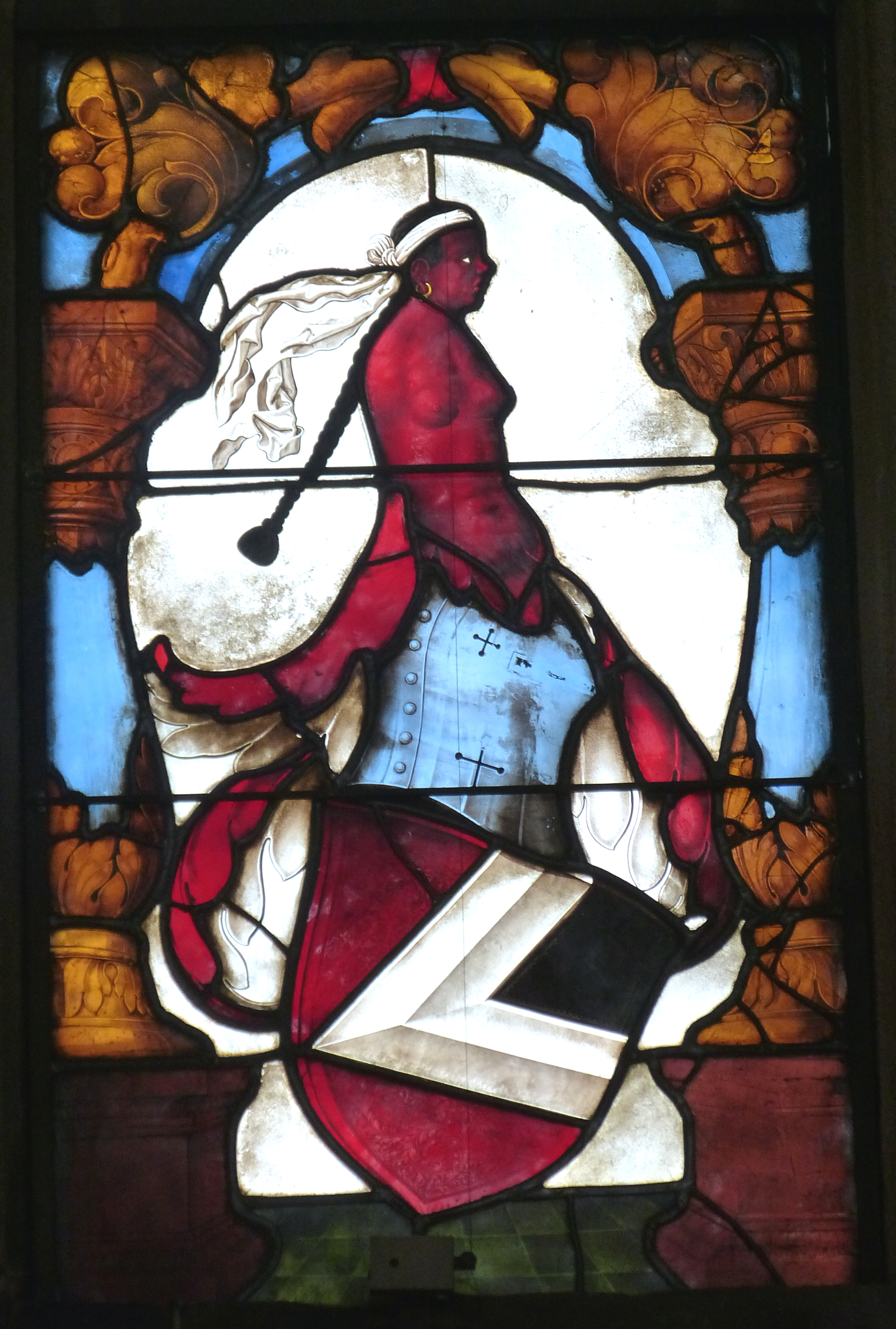
Window in St. Lorenz, Nuremberg

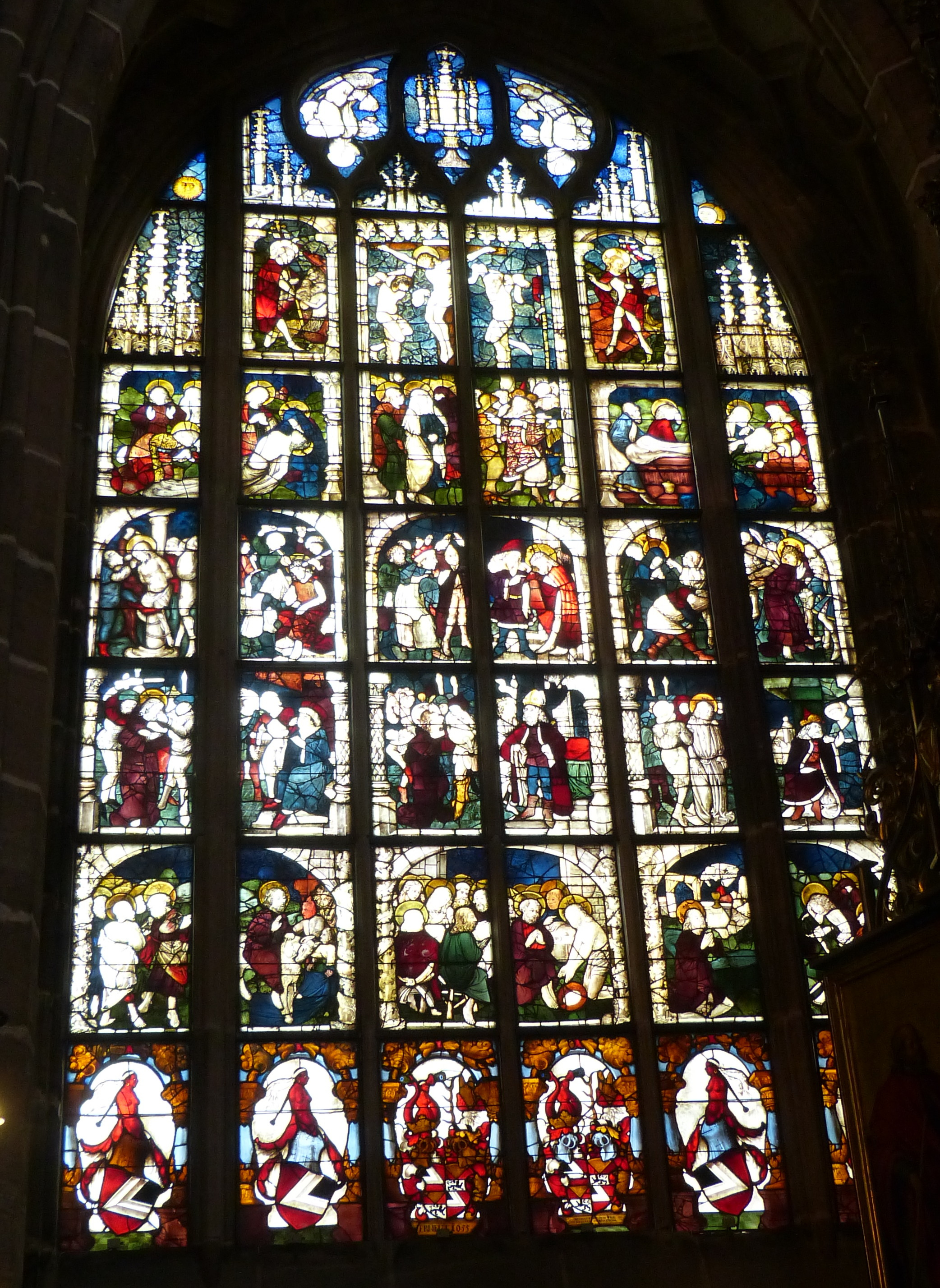
Haller Window in St Lorenz

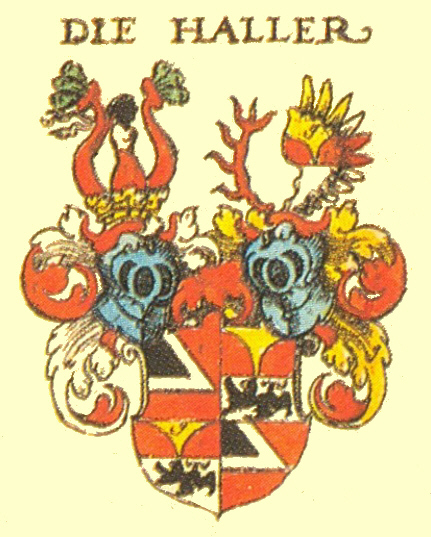
Larger coat of arms of 1528

=== Hungarian-Transylvanian Branch ===
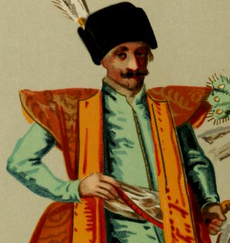
János Haller I (1626–1697)

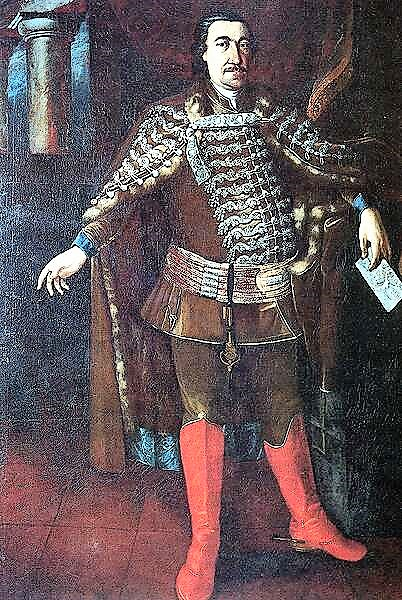
János Haller II (1692–1756)

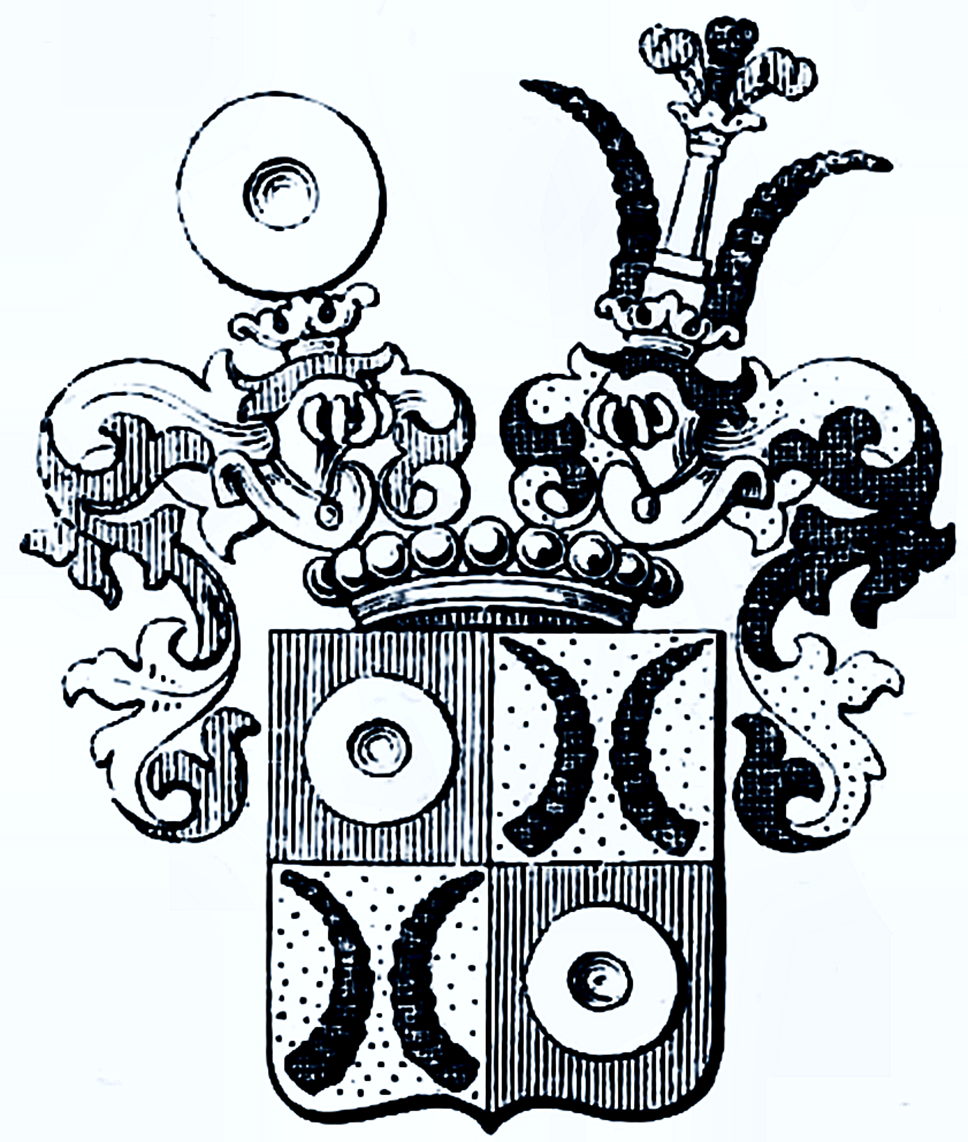
Coat of arms of the counts Haller de Hallerkeö in Transylvania (1713)

Ruprecht Haller (1452–1513) went to Buda in Hungary and received a patent in 1489, according to which he and his successors were allowed to buy Hungarian goods for up to 4,000 forints for export. He later became a councilor of Louis II of Hungary and finally his chief judge. He had five sons and founded a branch in the Kingdom of Hungary and in Transylvania that still exists today. Some of them translated their name Hallerstein into Hungarian ("Haller de Hallerkeö"). His son János operated a coin mint in Bratislava.

With Peter Haller a branch went to Sibiu in the then semi-independent Principality of Transylvania. The Hallers kept their Hungarian identity and served the elected Protestant princes, who were also mostly Hungarian, and acquired extensive property there. Peter's son Gábor Haller I (1558-1608) joined Stephen Bathory who was elected Prince of Transylvania in 1571. After he was elected King of Poland in 1576, he left Transylvania to his brother Christopher Báthory. Christopher's wife was the sister of Gábor Haller's wife Ilona Bocskai. Christopher's son and successor Sigismund Báthory however was hostile to Haller, yet, in 1599 he ceded Transylvania to his relative, Cardinal Andrew Báthory. After the turmoil connected with Michael the Brave, Stephen Bocskai (1557–1606) was elected prince in 1605, a passionate defender of the Reformation. Gábor Haller, a devoted Unitarian, had promoted him, and Bocskai rewarded him with money and offices. Under the subsequent prince Sigismund Rákóczi, Haller became city councilor, captain of the fortress Făgăraș and burgrave in the Kis-Küküllő County. He died in 1608 at his Fehéregyháza castle.

Stephen (István) Haller I (1591–1657) was a confidant of the anti-Habsburg Protestant princes Gabriel Bethlen and George I Rákóczi in the turmoil of the Thirty Years' War. He also became burgrave in Küküllő (Kokelburg), general and president of parliament. He was involved in the initiation of Bethlen's marriage to Catherine of Brandenburg. In 1610 he had a new castle built in Kerelőszentpál. He campaigned for tolerance towards Catholics. He left three sons: Paul II, Gábor II and Johann II.

Gábor Haller II (1614–1662), a son of Stephen Haller I, was a page at the court of Princess Catherine, then studied at the Viadrina University in Frankfurt/Oder from 1630, converted to the Reformed church and went to study at the University of Leiden, a stronghold of Calvinism. Under the Calvinist princes George I Rákóczi and his son George II, he made a career in the judiciary and in the military. After their defeat, he was taken into Turkish captivity. Only released in 1660, Prince Michael I Apafi, who had been installed by the Turks, regarded him as a competitor; in 1663 Gábor Haller was executed by the Turks. His diary is an important source of that time.

János Haller I (1626–1697), another son of Stephen I, was an important figure. During Apafi's reign, he was part of the opposition and spent a long time in captivity. There he studied literature and translated books into Hungarian, and also wrote a biography on Alexander the Great. After his release in 1682, he was sent to the Habsburg court in Vienna, and reached an agreement with the emperor, which became known as Tractatus Hallerianus. In 1691 he was elected treasurer of Transylvania.

Stephen (István) Haller II (1657–1710), eldest son of János I, became chairman of the government council of Transsilvania in 1692 under the new Habsburg rule, remaining a Hungarian national, while the two other members were Transylvanian Saxons. He remained governor until his death in 1710. He was instrumental in the reorganization of the Roman Catholic Church in Transylvania. He was raised to baronial rank in 1699 and, posthumously, created a count in 1713, a title which passed to his sons Gábor, János II and László Haller. Janos II (1692-1756) also became governor in 1734 and remained so for 22 years until his death; during his tenure there were disputes with the Reformed.

Franz Haller, count Haller de Hallerkeö (1796–1875) was an Austrian general and served as ban of Croatia-Slavonia between 1842 and 1845. Count Béla Haller (1854–1914) was a zoologist.

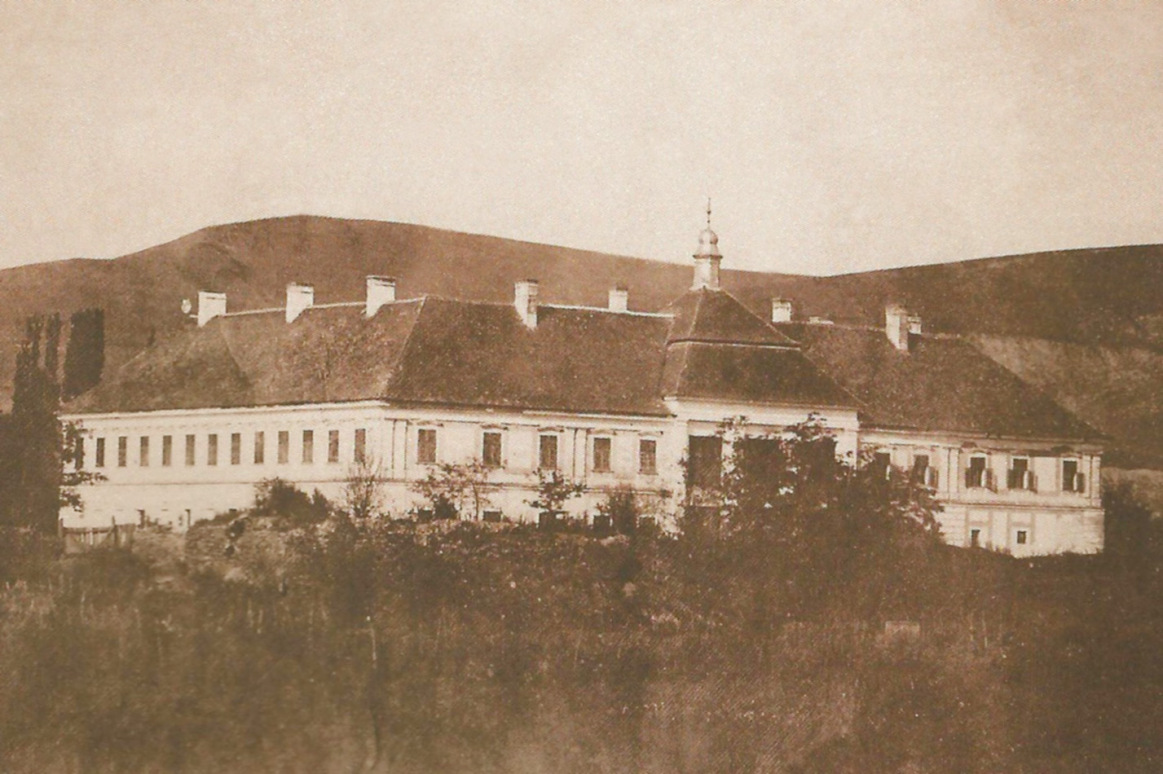
Kerelőszentpál Castle

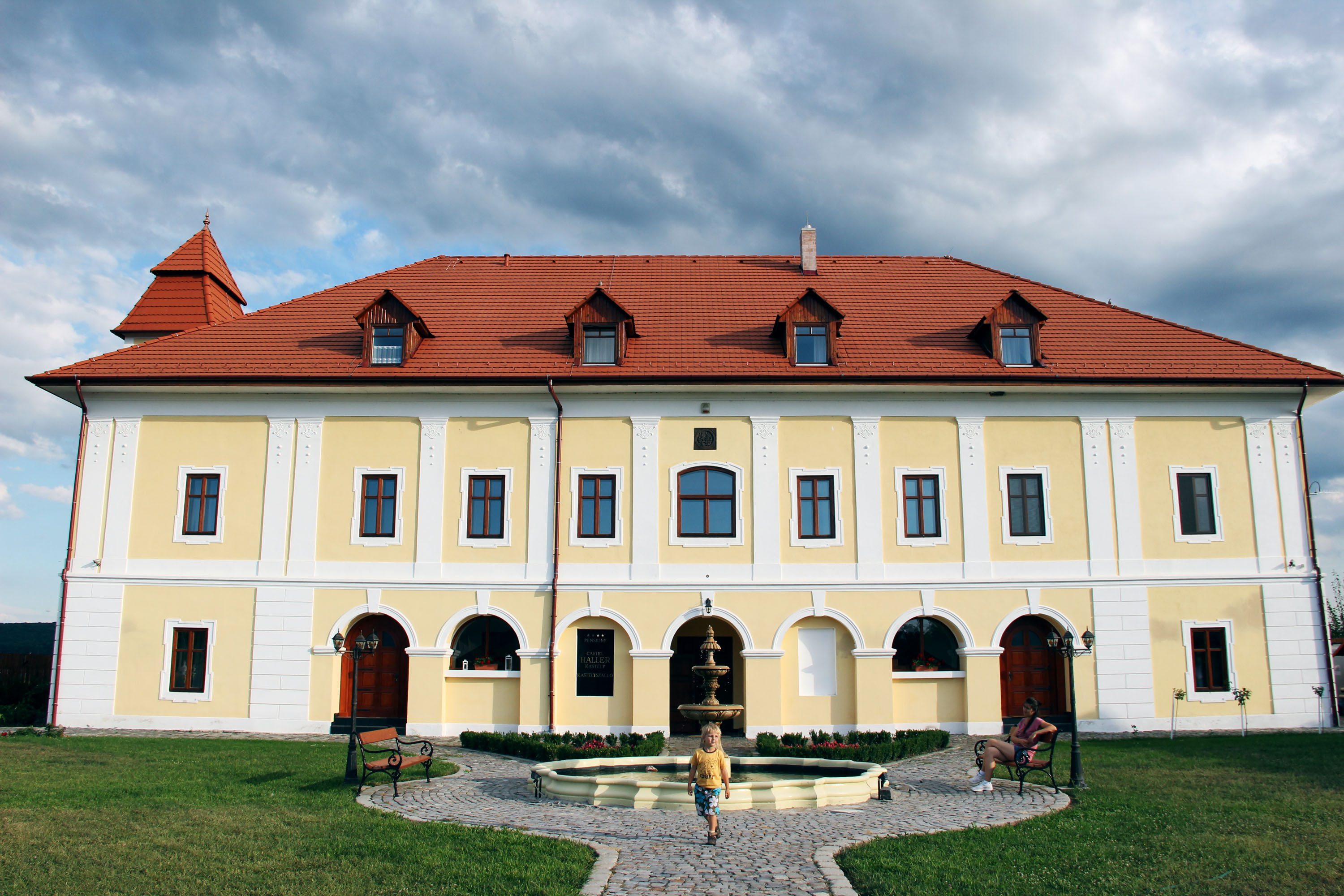
Marosugra Castle

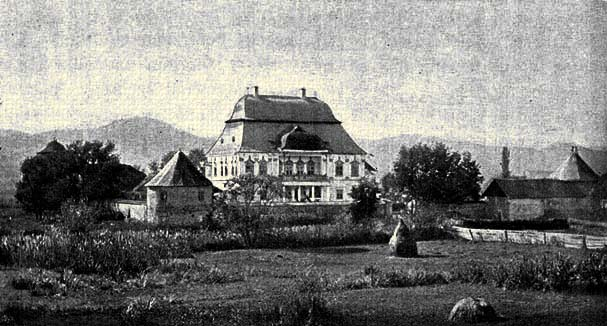
Coplean (Kapjon) Castle

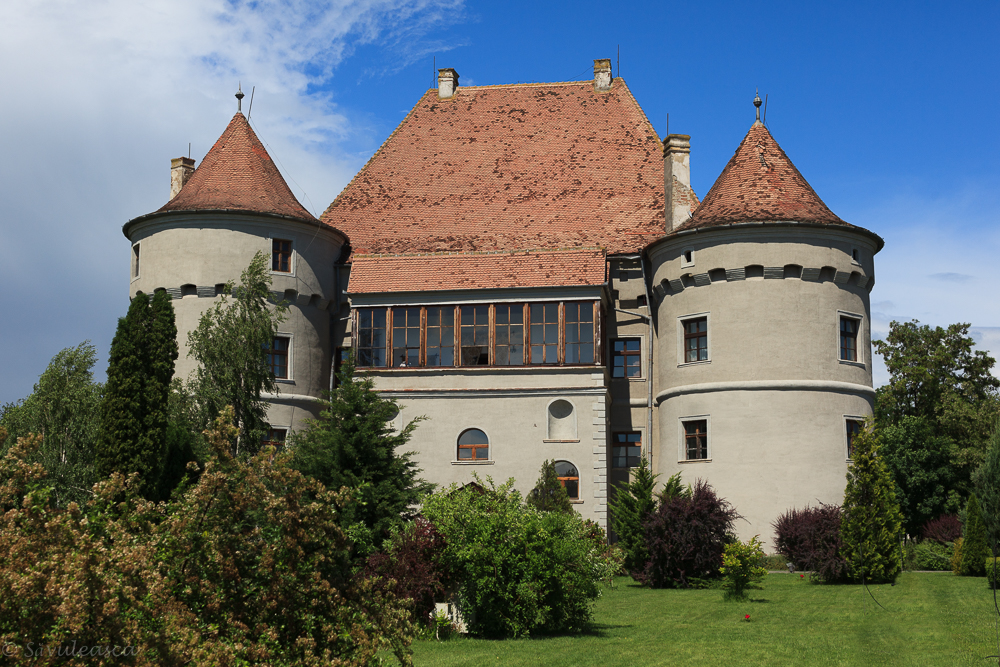
Küküllővár Castle
