= Kalchreuth =

- Municipality
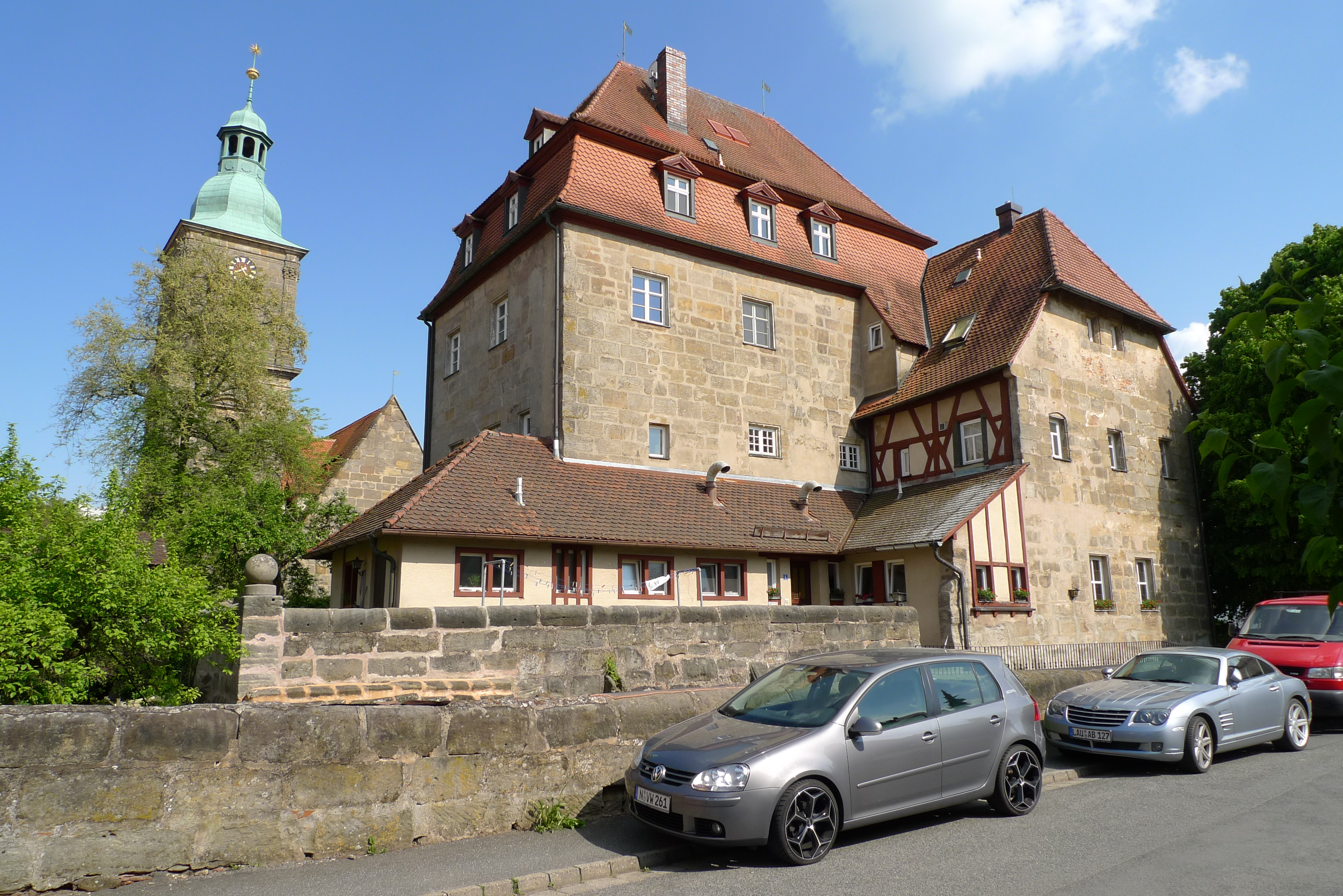
- Kalchreuth Castle

- Coat of arms

- Location of Kalchreuth within Erlangen-Höchstadt district
- Interactive map of Kalchreuth
- Location within Germany Location within Bavaria
- Coordinates: 49°34′N 11°08′E
- Country: Germany
- State: Bavaria
- Admin. region: Mittelfranken
- District: Erlangen-Höchstadt

Government
  - Mayor (2024–30): Otto Klaußner (CSU)

Area
  - Total: 10.84 km^{2} (4.19 sq mi)
- Elevation: 413 m (1,355 ft)

Population (2025-12-31)
  - Total: 2,986
  - Density: 275.5/km^{2} (713.4/sq mi)
- Time zone: UTC+01:00 (CET)
  - Summer (DST): UTC+02:00 (CEST)
- Postal codes: 90562
- Dialling codes: 0911
- Vehicle registration: ERH
- Website: www.kalchreuth.de

Kalchreuth is a municipality in the district of Erlangen-Höchstadt, in Bavaria, Germany. It is located 10 kilometers east of Erlangen and 15 kilometers north of Nuremberg and contains the villages of Kalchreuth, Käswasser and Röckenhof and also the hamlets of Stettenberg, Minderleinsmühle and Gabermühle.

== History ==
Like all Bavarian communities the municipality of Kalchreuth was founded in 1978 due to the Bavarian territorial reform. Yet, the first settlers came into the region between 1050 and 1100 A.D. and the village was first mentioned in a document in 1298.

In 1342 most of the estates were sold to the Patrician family Haller von Hallerstein in whose possession it was until 1465 and was later on taken over by the Free Imperial City of Nuremberg. Because of being part of Nuremberg Kalchreuth got Prussian in 1796.

Due to the Treaties of Tilsit the region got under French administration as being part of the Principality of Bayreuth from 1807 until 1810, after which it got part of the Kingdom of Bavaria. The community in its first form was forged together in 1818 by the Second Community Edict.

== Coat of arms ==
The coat of arms of Kalchreuth is split in four parts of which the upper left one features an obliquely leaned silver and black chevron that was taken from the blazon of the Haller von Hallersteins. The upper right quarter shows an armed black lion with a red crown on silver ground (retrieved from the Nuremberg Castle earl’s crest) while the nether left part shows a black saltire on silver ground and the nether right quarter shows a silver cherry blossom on red ground symbolizing the community’s location in one of the most popular Franconian cherry-growing area.

== Twin towns ==
- La Chapelle-des-Fougeretz (France), since 1993
