= Ruprecht Haller von Hallerstein =

Bavarian noble lord

Ruprecht Or Robert Haller von Hallerstein, (1533-1560) was a Bavarian noble lord.

== Family ==
He was born into the Noble House of Haller von Hallerstein in Nurnberg, son of Lord Bartholomäus Haller von Hallerstein (1486–1551), secretary of Queen Mary of Hungary. He married the daughter of Lazarus Knight Tucher von Simmelsdorf, they lived in Flanders.

1. Lazarus Haller von Hallerstein, 1548.
2. Ludwig Haller von Hallerstein, 1550 Pupil and personal Friend of Ortelius, died Antwerpen.
3. Jacob Haller von Hallerstein, 1551, died 1612 Antwerpen.

One of the related family members is Louise Haller von Hallerstein; abbess of Soleilmont Abbey.

== Career ==
He was member of the Imperial Council, and was councillor of War. In his young years he took active service in Constantinople. In Antwerpen he was active like his family in law in the economic welfare. Ruprecht died in Brussels.
