= Pfinzing von Henfenfeld =

Patrician family in Nuremberg

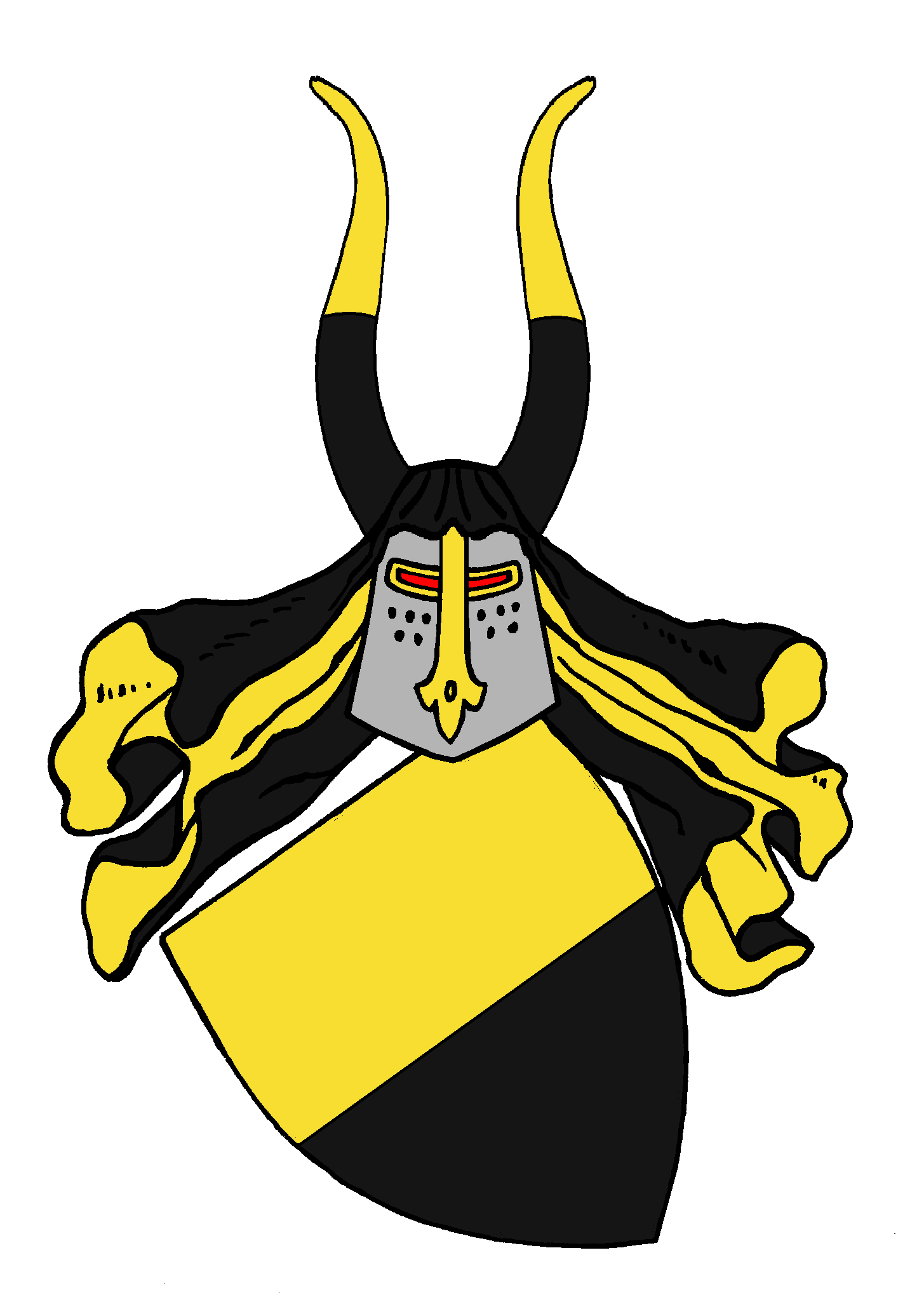
Coat of arms that the Pfinzing took over from the Gewsmyd (Geuschmid) around 1300

The Pfinzing von Henfenfeld were one of the oldest patrician families in the imperial city of Nuremberg . They are first mentioned in a document in 1233 and were represented in the inner council from the beginning of the council records in 1274 until their extinction in 1764 . This made them the oldest Nuremberg council family. According to the dance Statute of 1521 belonged to the twenty old lines eligible for Ratsfähigen. In 1764 the male line died out.

Throughout its history the family boasted five Reichsschultheiß (mayors) of Nuremberg

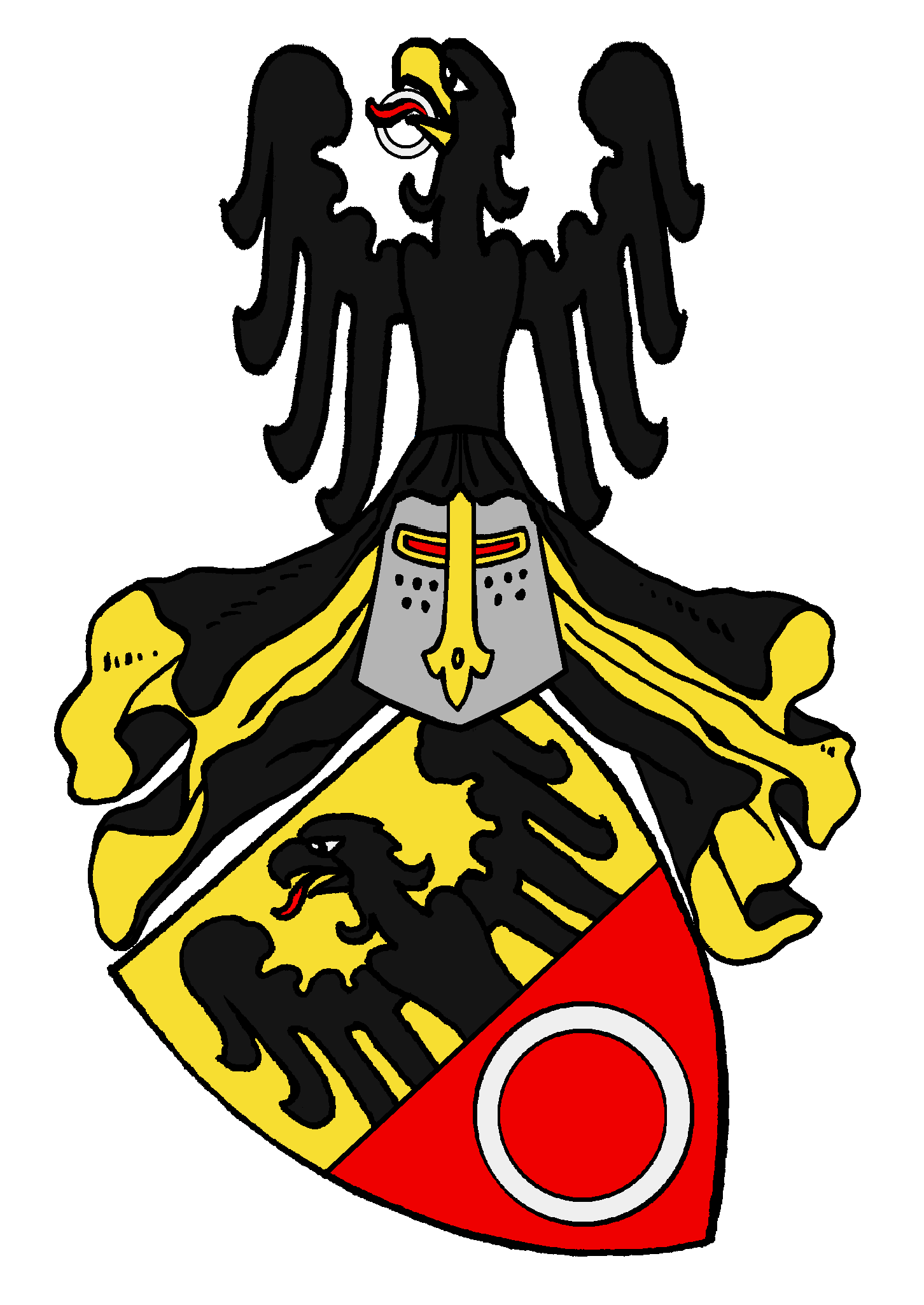
Original coat of arms (before 1300) of the Pfinzing

== History ==
The Pfinzing (also: Pfintzing) came from the Reichsministerialität around Nuremberg and were first mentioned in 1233 with Sifridus de Nurinberc, called Pfincinch, in a document from the Heilsbronn monastery. The family was one of the most important Nuremberg patrician families .

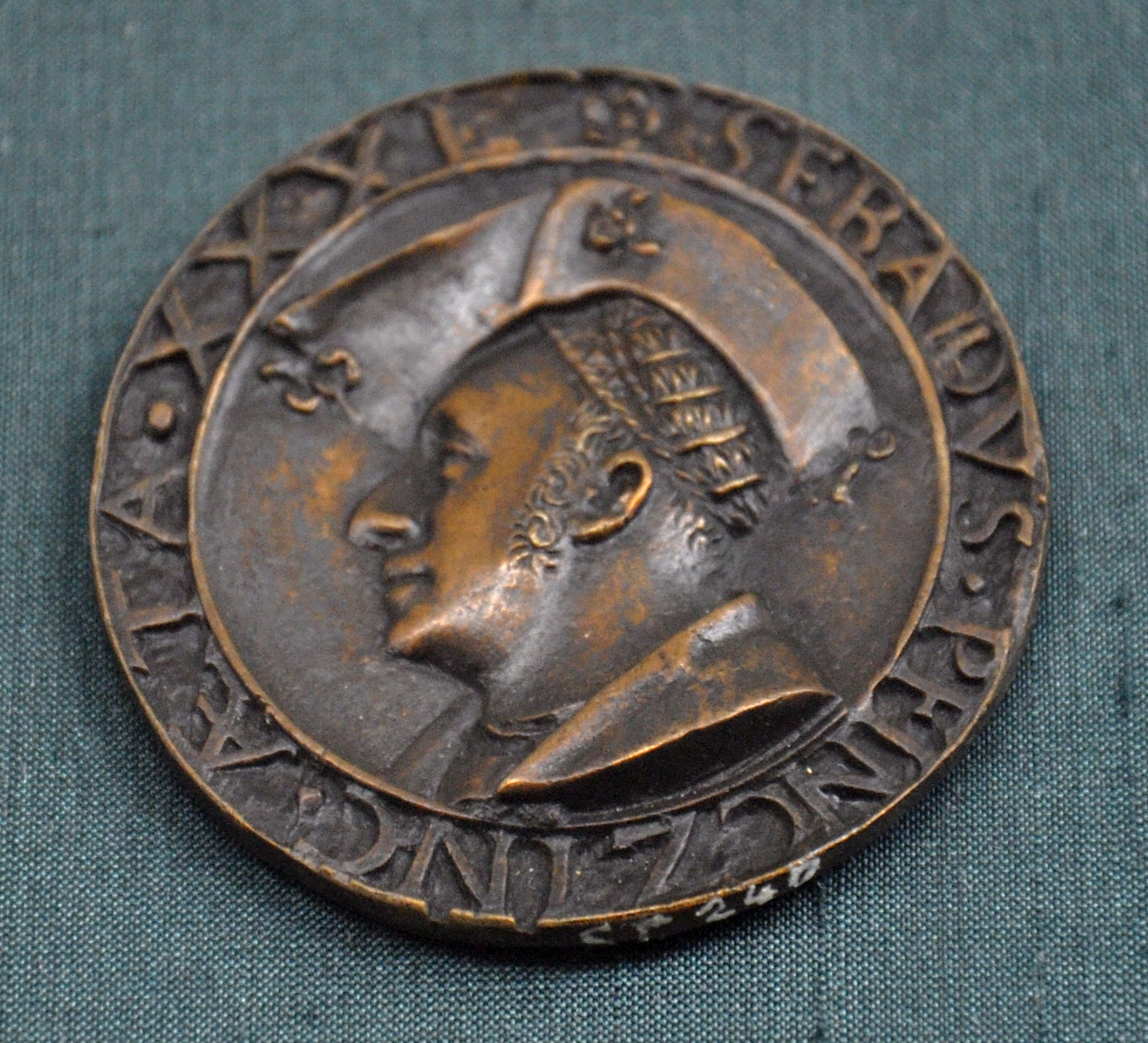
Bronze medal with the portrait of Sebald Pfinzing (1487–1537), councilor in Nuremberg

The Pfinzing had occupied the office of Reichsschultheissen several times as early as 1274 and were a power factor in the wide-ranging Nuremberg trade policy in the 14th century. Our own trading activities in Southeastern Europe, in Italy and as a partner in Stromer's trading company are also documented early on. Bertold Pfinzing († 1405), Ulrich Stromer's son-in-law, was King Wenzel's advisor and financier . His son, Sebald Pfinzing († 1431), also played a major role in politics. Together with Peter Volckamer, he was the most important Nuremberg liaison to King Sigismund in 1411/31 and then one of the richest citizens of the city. In the 16th century the Pfinzing owned a wide-ranging trading network with bases in Venice, Salzburg, Augsburg, Regensburg, Leipzig and Breslau, among others. They traded in textiles and spices, were involved in the Schlaggenwald tin trade and, above all, in the Mansfeld iron and steel trade . They did business with iron ore mining and processing in the Upper Palatinate and owned their own Seigerhütte in Ludwigsstadt . The Pfinzing belonged, along with the Imhoff, Tucher and Welser, to the last patrician long-distance traders. Together with Hans Welser, Martin II Pfinzing (1521–1572) was elected as the first lord of the market to the trading board of the Nuremberg Stock Exchange

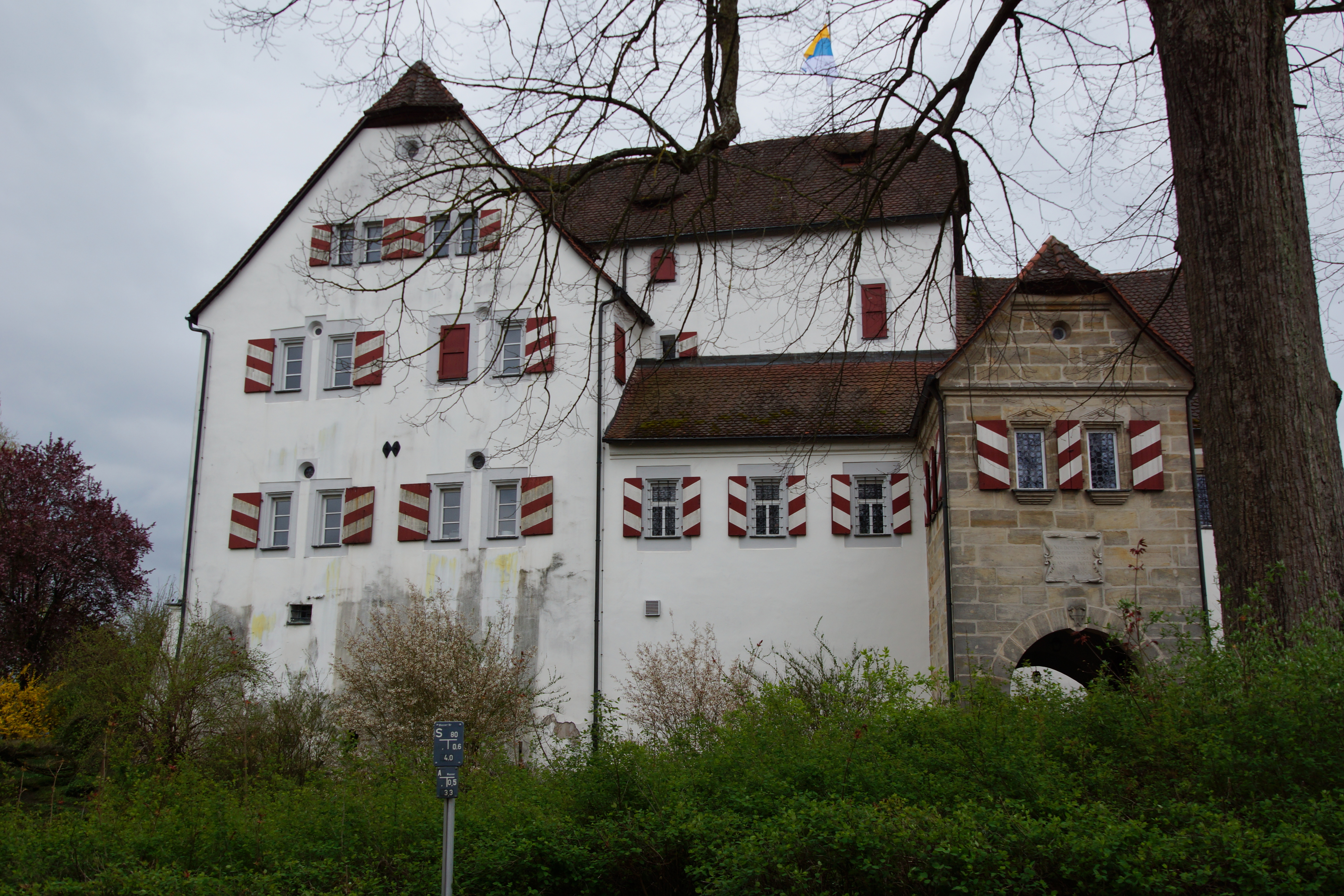
Henfenfeld Castle

The wealth of the Pfinzing was documented in numerous possessions in and around Nuremberg. In 1530, Martin I Pfinzing (1490–1552) bought the ancestral seat of Burg Henfenfeld from the Egloffsteins and named his line Pfinzing von Henfenfeld after the village of the same name . The addition to the name was recognized as a title of nobility and confirmed by an improvement in the coat of arms in 1554 .

The Henfenfeld main line of the sex died out with the Reichsschultheissen Johann Sigmund Pfinzing von Henfenfeld (1712–1764). Heirs were the Hallers von Hallerstein .

Branch lines of the family were: the Nuremberg Line († 1598), the Pfinzing von Weigelshof († 1617) and the Pfinzing von Gründlach († 1739)

== Coat of arms ==
The coat of arms, originally from the Nuremberg Geuschmid family, around 1300 (formal imperial approval for this in 1465) and since then carried by the Pfinzing, shows a shield divided into gold over black. On the helmet with black and gold covers two buffalo horns marked like the shield. The original coat of arms of the Pfinzing family, however, is said to have been divided by gold and red, with a black eagle above and a silver ring below. Fritz Pfinzing, (* around 1276; † between 1327/1331) in Nuremberg, mentioned 1303–1327, was a jury nurse of the infirmary near St. Johann. He was married to Elsbet Geuschmid(* around 1280/1285), the daughter of Berthold Geuschmid (* around 1255/1260; † 1331), mentioned in Nuremberg in 1290. Fritz Pfinzing's father-in-law Berthold Geuschmid was again the son of a Pfinzing, from Elisabeth (* around 1245). Fritz Pfinzing finally dropped the old Pfinzing family coat of arms (around 1300) and adopted the Geuschmid coat of arms: "Gold and black divided". (Cf. Pfinzingsche Ahnentafel in: Der Pfinzing-Atlas von 1594, StsA Nürnberg 1994.) In the following centuries there was some ambiguity as to which the Pfinzing's actual family coat of arms was, so that in Siebmacher at the beginning of the 18th century The original coat of arms of the Pfinzing was wrongly ascribed to the Geuschmid. (See illustration.)

=== Historical Coats of Arms ===
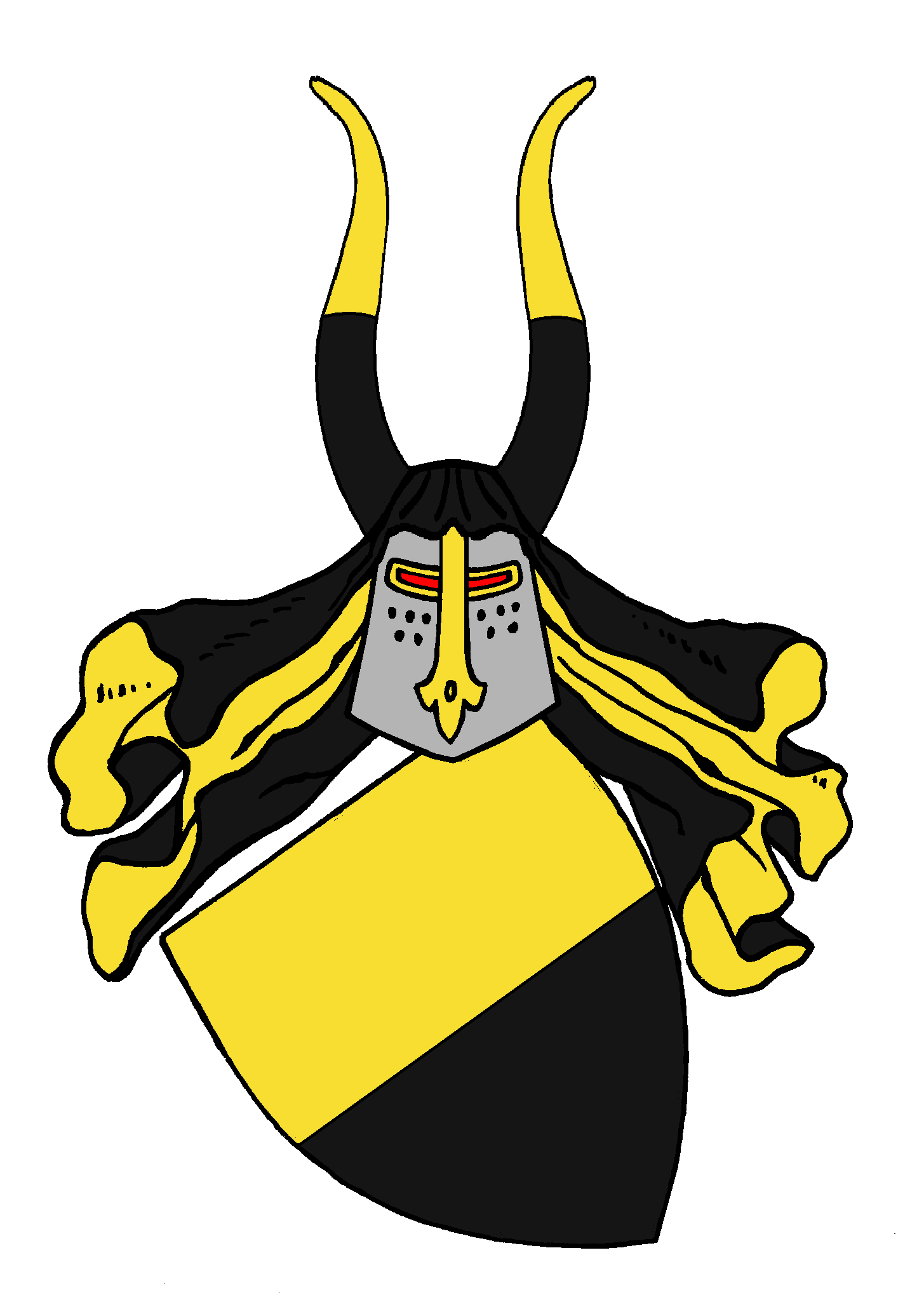
Family coat of arms of the Pfinzing von Henfenfeld (since around 1300)

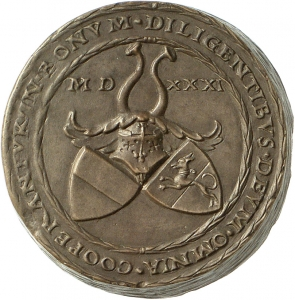
Alliance coat of arms of the Pfinzing and Peringsdörffer (1531)

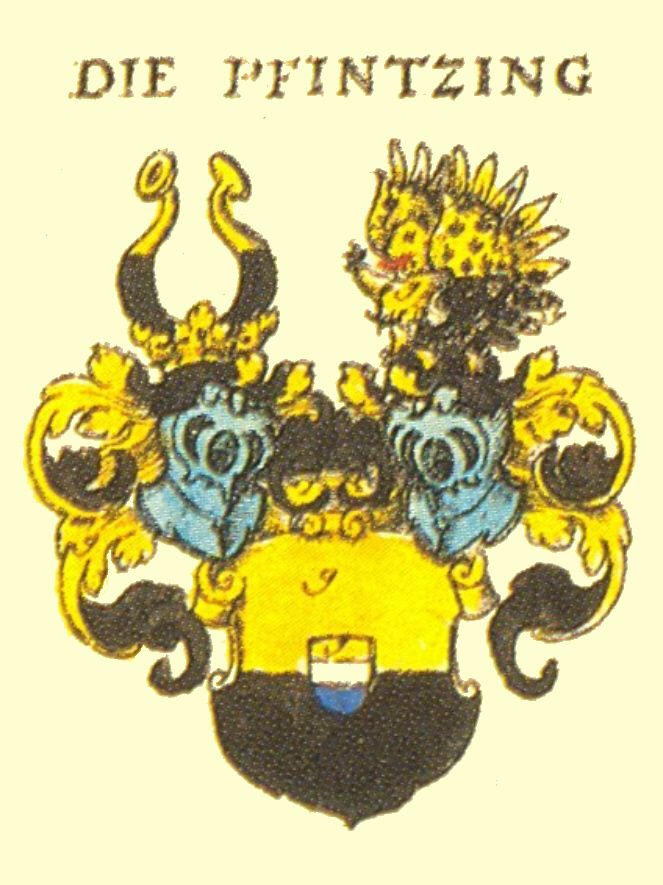
Coat of arms of the Pfinzing in Siebmacher (around 1600)

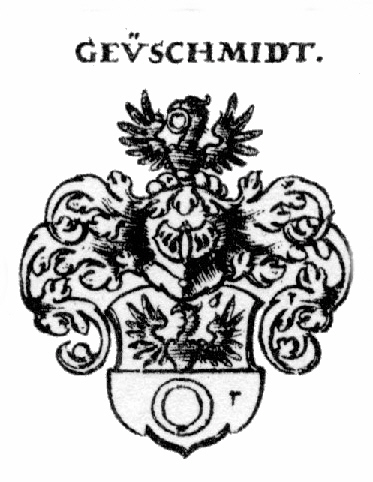
In the Siebmacher around 1700 wrongly attributed to the Geuschmid: the original Pfinzing coat of arms

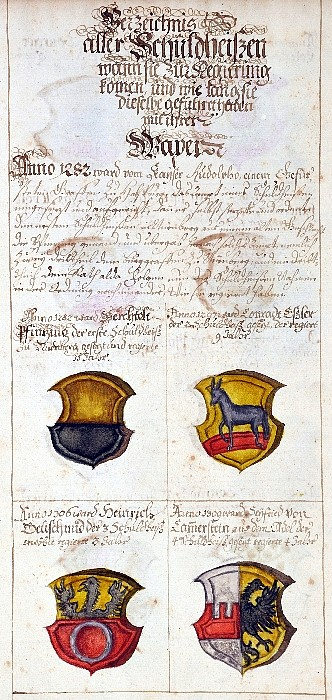
Representation of the Nuremberg mayors, approx. 17./18. Century, also with erroneous attribution of the Geuschmid coat of arms

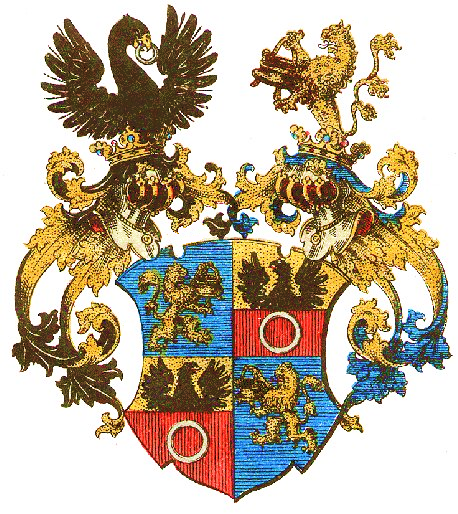
Improved coat of arms of the Oelhafen

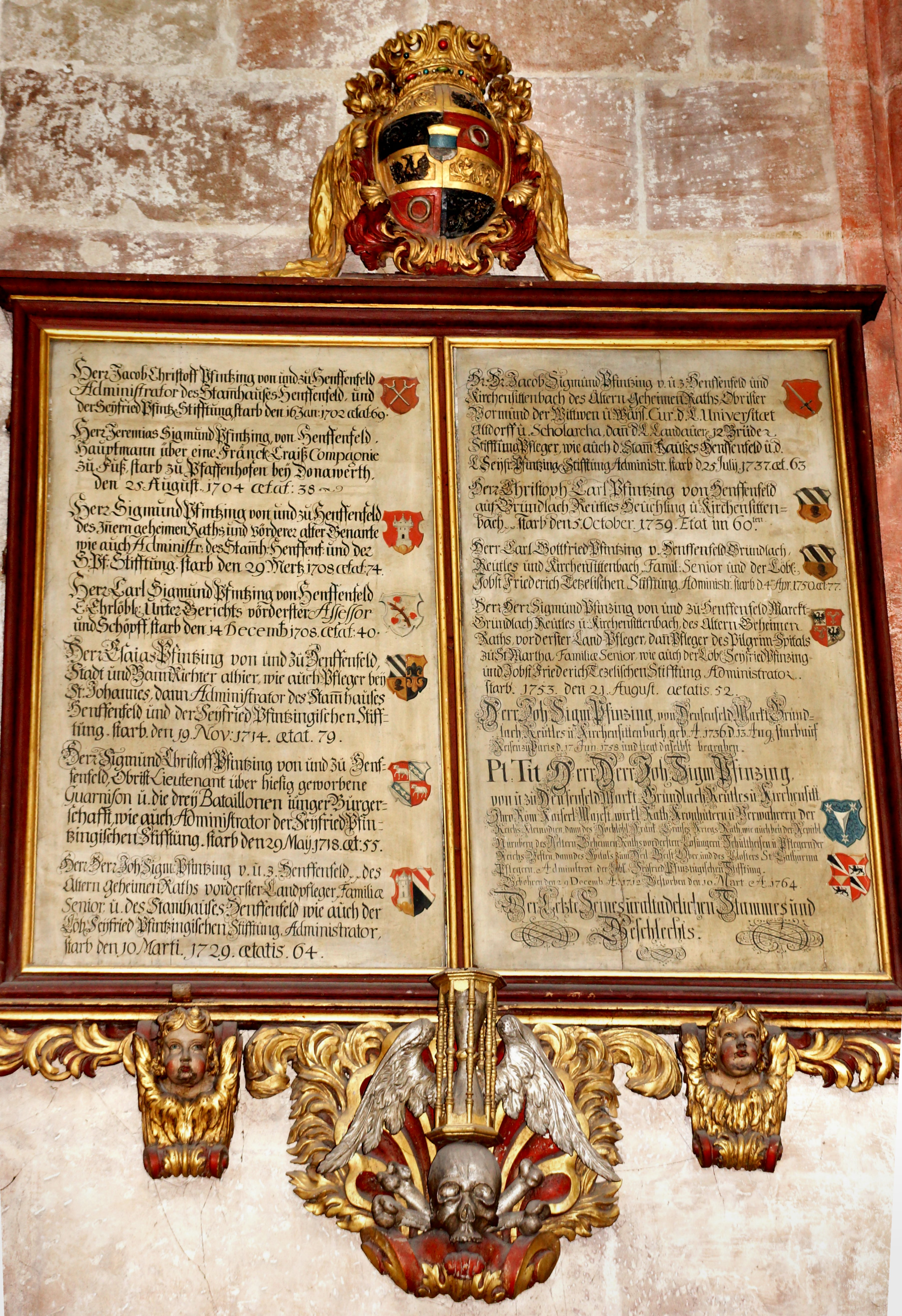
Epitaph in the Sebal Church

(After improving the coat of arms in 1554) divided into four : Fields 1 and 4 divided by gold and black (allegedly once the coat of arms of the Geuschmid), 2 and 3 divided by gold and red, above a black eagle above, below a silver ring (allegedly originally the coat of arms of the Pfinzing), covered with a heart shield divided by gold, blue and silver († von Henfenfeld).

== See also ==
- German Nobility
- History of the city of Nuremberg
- List of castles, palaces and manors in Germany
