= Mathes =

Mathes may refer to:

== Given name ==
- Mathes Roriczer (1440–1493), German architect

== Surname ==
- Ben Mathes, minister in the Presbyterian Church (USA) involved in providing health care in remote regions of the world
- Charles Mathes (born 1949), American author of mystery novels
- Harry Mathes (1882–1969), American painter in the New York art scene
- Lena B. Mathes (1861–1951), American educator, social reformer, and ordained minister
- Les Mathes, commune in the Charente-Maritime department in western France
- Merissa Mathes (born 1940), American actress and model
- Rob Mathes, American record producer, music arranger, composer, songwriter, and performer
- Simone Mathes (born 1975), German hammer thrower
- W. Michael Mathes (1936–2012), American historian and academic

== Other uses ==
- Cheff v. Mathes (Del. 1964), case in the Delaware Supreme Court
- Curtis Mathes Corporation, North American electronics retailer based in Garland, Texas
- Elser-Mathes Cup, celebrates the first two-way contact by amateur radio between the Earth and Mars
