= The Frog and the Fox =

Aesop's fable mocking hypocrisy

The Frog and the Fox is one of Aesop's Fables and is numbered 289 in the Perry Index. It takes the form of a humorous anecdote told against quack doctors.

== Physician, heal thyself ==
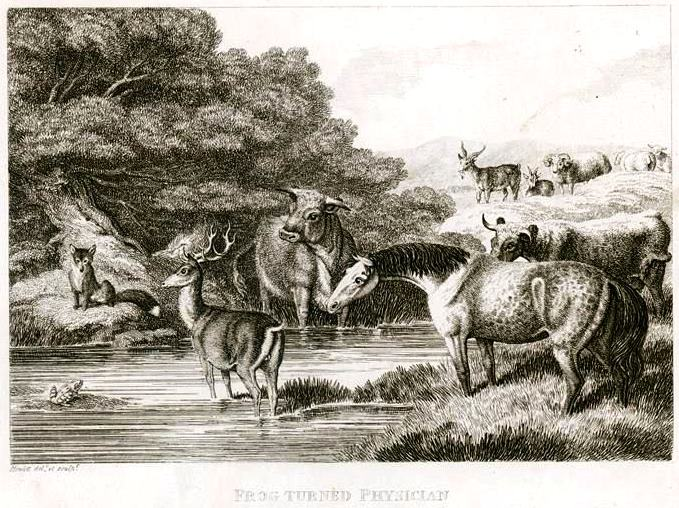
Samuel Howitt's etching of the fable, 1810

A frog leaves his native swamp and proclaims himself a wonder-working doctor. He is then asked by a sceptical fox how it is that he cannot cure his own lameness and sickly complexion. The fox's taunt echoes the Greek proverb, "Physician, heal thyself", which was current in Aesop's time (and was later quoted in the Christian scriptures). The fable was recorded in Greek by Babrius, and afterwards was Latinised by Avianus. When William Caxton featured the story in 1484, he added a comment advising caution against hypocrisy, again quoting the scriptural admonition.

By the time the fable appeared in the collection illustrated by Francis Barlow (1687), the emphasis had shifted to asking for proof to back the frog's boasts:

Pretences which no reall actions prop,
Like crazy Structures, Straight to Ruin drop.

Samuel Croxall's 1722 commentary on the fable is generalised to the advice that "we should not set up for rectifying enormities in others, while we labour under the same ourselves". But, while also quoting "Physician, heal thyself", Croxall put his finger on a weakness in the original story by warning against being motivated solely by prejudice against the person offering advice. And in his amplified verse account, "Affectation expos'd" (1744), John Hawkesworth mentions several specious cures that seemed to back the frog's credentials. Its imposture is not unveiled until the healthy fox pretends to be ill. Only after the frog concurs in this self-diagnosis does the fox denounce it in public.

== Picturing the fable ==
At the start of the 19th century a recension of the fables in Greek and Latin provided another moral that highlights the weakness of the frog's self-promotion: Iactantia refutat seipsam (boasting disproves itself). Croxall had also underlined the questionable nature of the frog's discourse that, being "uttered in a parcel of hard, cramp words which nobody understood, made the beasts admire his learning and give credit to everything he said." All, that is, except the fox, who saw through the frog's pretence. Illustrations of the fable have consequently depicted the gullible audience surrounding the frog as it takes its stance on the edge of the marsh, generally with the fox sitting off to one side. In Heinrich Steinhöwel's edition (1476) the listeners include nothing more exotic than a rat, a rabbit and a hedgehog, but Henry Walker Herrick (1869) and Ernest Griset (1874) furnish a more varied menagerie. Francis Barlow concentrates largely on an audience of domestic animals but places a squirrel and a monkey in the overhanging branches of a tree, where Samuel Croxall's illustrator and Thomas Bewick (1818) confine themselves to deer and farm beasts. The frog addresses these from the bank or, in the case of Samuel Howitt (1810, see above), from a marshy tussock. Later artists portray the frog as a huckster performing in front of a cluster of bystanders, as in the case of J. M. Condé (1905), Arthur Rackham (1912), John Vernon Lord (1989) and Arlene Graston (2016). These change the focus to the title given the story by George Fyler Townsend (1887), "The Quack Frog".
