= Master of the Tucher Altarpiece =

German painter

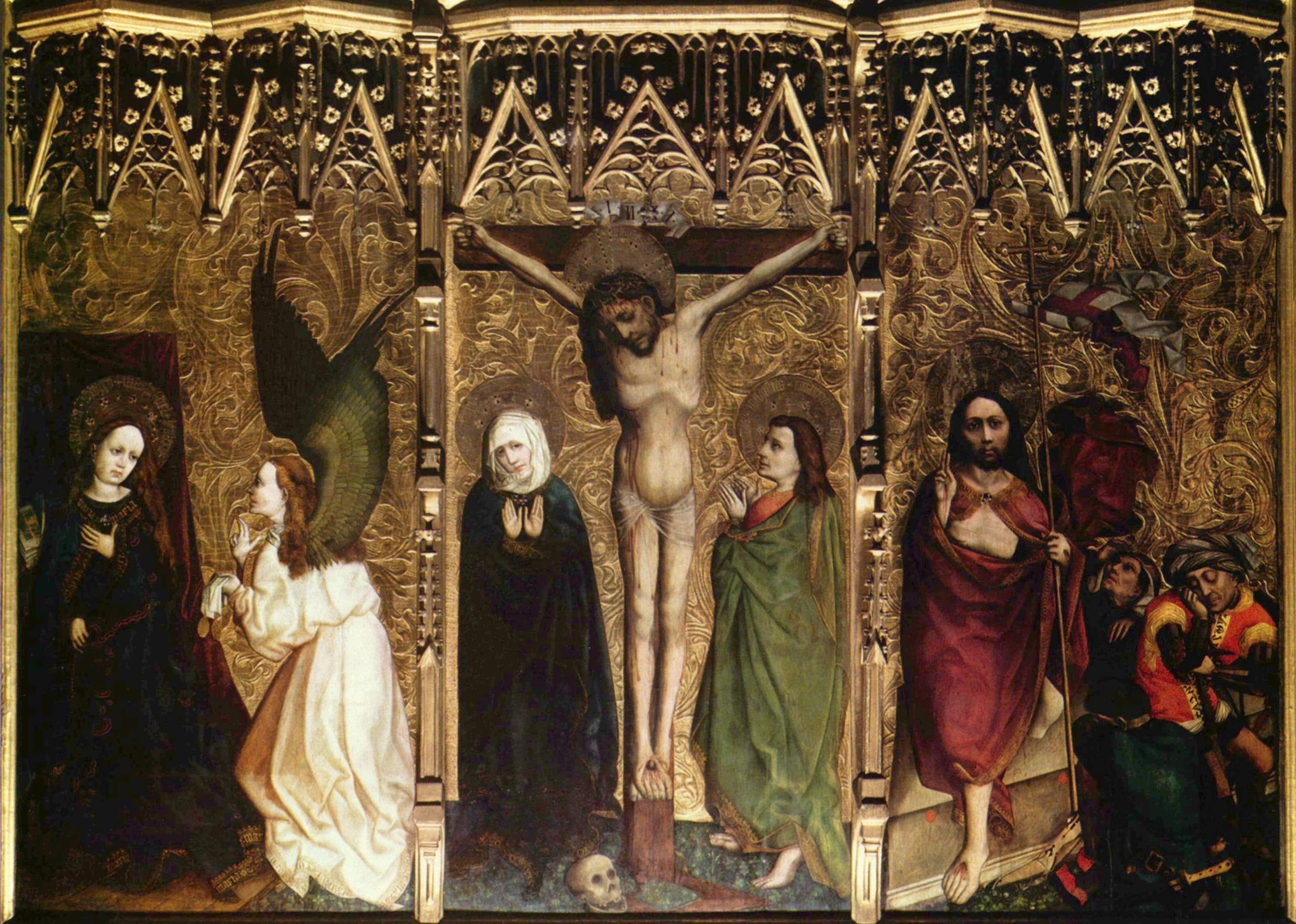
Center section of the Tucher Altarpiece, from left to right: The Annunciation, The Crucifixion, and The Resurrection. (1440-50) Oil, tempera, and embossed gold leaf on wood panel. Frauenkirche, Nuremberg

The Master of the Tucher Altarpiece (fl c. 1430–1450) was a German painter active in Nuremberg. His name is derived from a painting which has been in that city's Frauenkirche since the early 19th century; this has been known as the Tucher Altarpiece at least since 1615, in which year it was moved from its initial location (the Augustinians' church in Nuremberg), to another church in the same city. This move, and the accompanying restoration of the painting, was done under the auspices of the Tucher family, from whom it received its name.

The Master's style is of a piece with that of his contemporaries such as Konrad Witz and Hans Multscher, all of whose realism is based on sculptural forms. Unlike Witz, he chose to depict only solid forms, especially those of the human figure, doing away with any suggestion of background. This can be seen in the central panel of his eponymous altarpiece, in which a painting of the Crucifixion is flanked by scenes from the Annunciation and Resurrection. The figures stand against a tooled gold ground with no perspective depth. Elaborate tracery, a baldacchino, projects over them as if to suggest that they are actually statues. A still-life appears on the exterior, part of the setting for the Vision of Saint Augustine. This resembles similar still lifes painted in the niches above a group of prophets by Barthélemy d'Eyck in a painting of 1445; even so, there is no indication that d'Eyck and the Master were the same artist.

Indeed, too little information exists to draw a more compelling portrait of the Master, or to suggest that he had any sort of career outside of Nuremberg. Eight paintings in total, including some polyptychs, have been attributed to him or to his studio. Among these are the so-called Haller Altarpiece, in the St. Sebaldus Church in Nuremberg, and the Ehenheim Epitaph in that city's St. Lorenz Church.
