= Physician, heal thyself =

Ancient saying

"Physician, heal thyself" (Greek: Ἰατρέ, θεράπευσον σεαυτόν, Iatre, therapeuson seauton), sometimes quoted in the Latin form, Medice, cura te ipsum, is an ancient proverb appearing in Luke 4:23. There, Jesus is quoted as saying, "Ye will surely say unto me this proverb, 'Physician, heal thyself': whatsoever we have heard done in Capernaum, do also here in thy country." Commentators have pointed out the echo of similar skepticism in the taunts that Jesus would ultimately hear while hanging on the cross: "He saved others; himself he cannot save". The shortened Latin form of the proverb, Medice, cura te ipsum, was made famous through the Latin translation of the Bible, the Vulgate, and so gained currency across Europe.

== Background ==
The proverb appeared in Aesop's fable The Frog and the Fox in Ancient Greece, predating Christianity. Similar proverbs appear in classical texts from at least the 6th century BCE. The Greek dramatist Aeschylus refers to one in his Prometheus Bound, where the chorus comments to the suffering Prometheus, "Like an unskilled doctor, fallen ill, you lose heart and cannot discover by which remedies to cure your own disease."

Similar proverbs with a medical theme appear in other Jewish literature. For example, "Physician, physician, heal thine own limp!" (Imperial Aramaic: אסיא אסי חיגרתך) can be found in Genesis Rabbah 23:4 (300–500 CE).

== Interpretation ==
The moral of the proverb in general, containing within itself also a criticism of hypocrisy, is to attend to one's defects before those in others.

== See also ==
- The pot calling the kettle black
- List of Latin phrases
- The Mote and the Beam
- Woes of the Pharisees

Physician, heal thyself Life of Jesus
Preceded by Samaritan woman at the well	New Testament; Events	Succeeded by Calling of Matthew
