= Tucher von Simmelsdorf =

German noble family

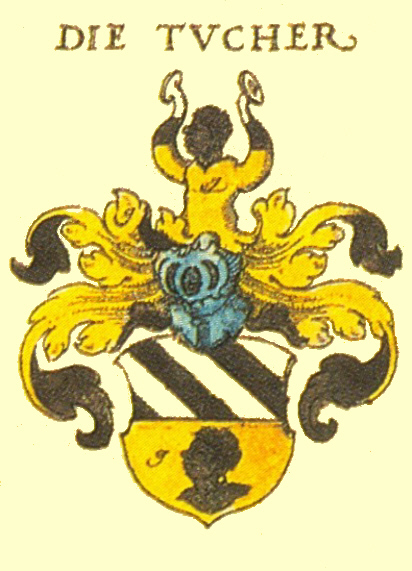
Tucher coat of arms

Tucher von Simmelsdorf (German pronunciation: [ˈtuːχɐ]) is a noble patrician family from Nürnberg. Like the Fugger and Welser families from Augsburg, their company ran trading branches across Europe between the 15th and 17th centuries, although on a somewhat smaller scale. The Protestant family played an import part in the economical and cultural development as well as in local politics. They were admitted to the governing council of the free imperial city since 1340, a hereditary privilege, and listed in the Dance Statute. After the acquisition of Simmelsdorf Castle in 1598, the family was named Tucher von Simmelsdorf and ennobled in 1697. In 1815, they became Bavarian barons.

== German branch ==
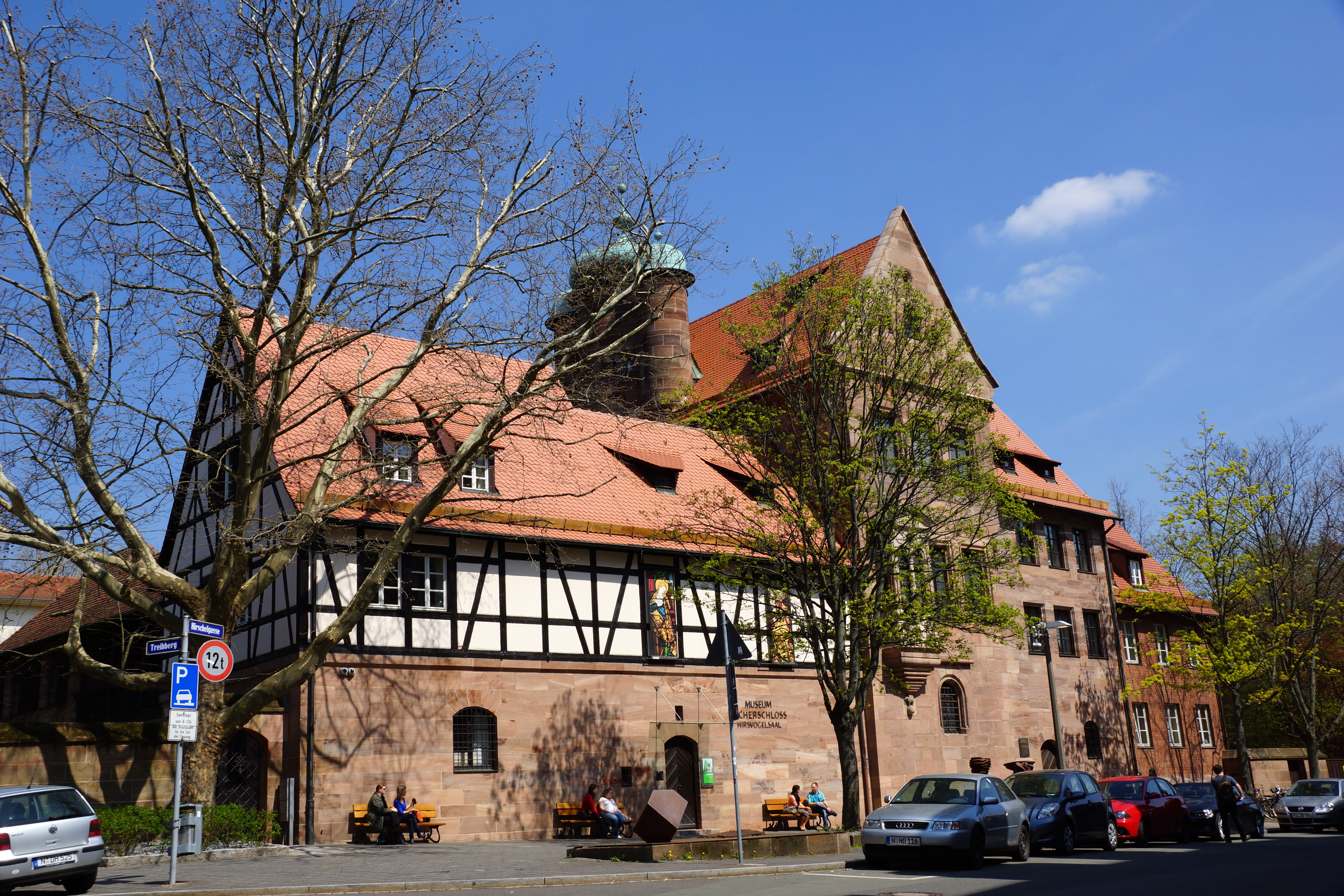
Tucherschloss, Nürnberg

The first known member is Berthold Tucher, who became a citizen of Nuremberg in 1309. The Tuchers gained considerable importance in the economic golden age of Nuremberg and spread to Lyon, Antwerp, Geneva and Venice. Although they founded their own commercial branches relatively late in comparison to other patrician families, they became one of the richest merchant families in the city due to their trade connections throughout Europe. They were also engaged in mining in Tyrol, Austria, like the Fuggers. In the 17th century, the Tuchers, along with the Imhoff family, operated the last big trading companies of the Nuremberg patriciate; both families especially competed in the European saffron trade.

They were among the most important patrons of the golden age of Nuremberg art around 1500. Their main residence was the Tucherschloss (Tucher castle) at Nuremberg, still today owned by the family and housing a museum on the history of the Tuchers and the Nuremberg trading businesses of the Renaissance age. The family also still owns the castles of Simmelsdorf, Behringersdorf and Schoppershof.

Three members of the family were portrayed by Albrecht Dürer, among them Elsbeth Tucher (1473–1517), whose image was depicted on the older 20 Deutsche Mark banknote.

A branch moved to Antwerp in the late 15th century, for six generations, providing three mayors to the city, and remaining Catholic. Like most ruling patricians of German free imperial cities, the Nuremberg Tuchers became Lutheran Protestants with the Reformation. During the 19th and 20th centuries the family continued to brew a locally famed beer, Tucher Bräu.

Their heraldic crest shows a black moor in gold, with the motto: Sincere et Constanter ("Sincere and Steadfast").

== Images ==
Of all trading families of Nuremberg, the Tucher family was probably among the most important patrons for works of art of the Golden Age.

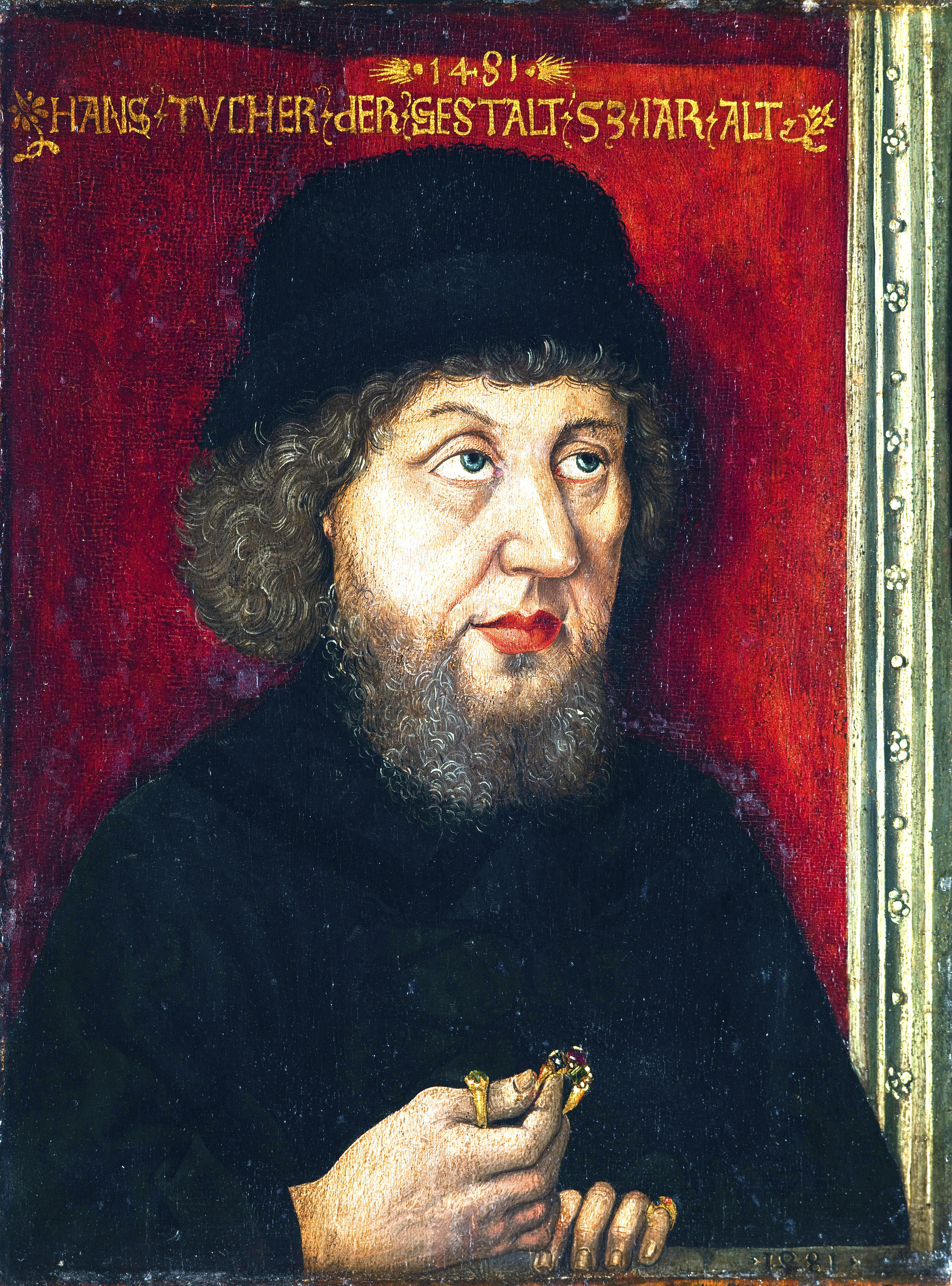
Hans Tucher (1428–1491), by Michael Wolgemut

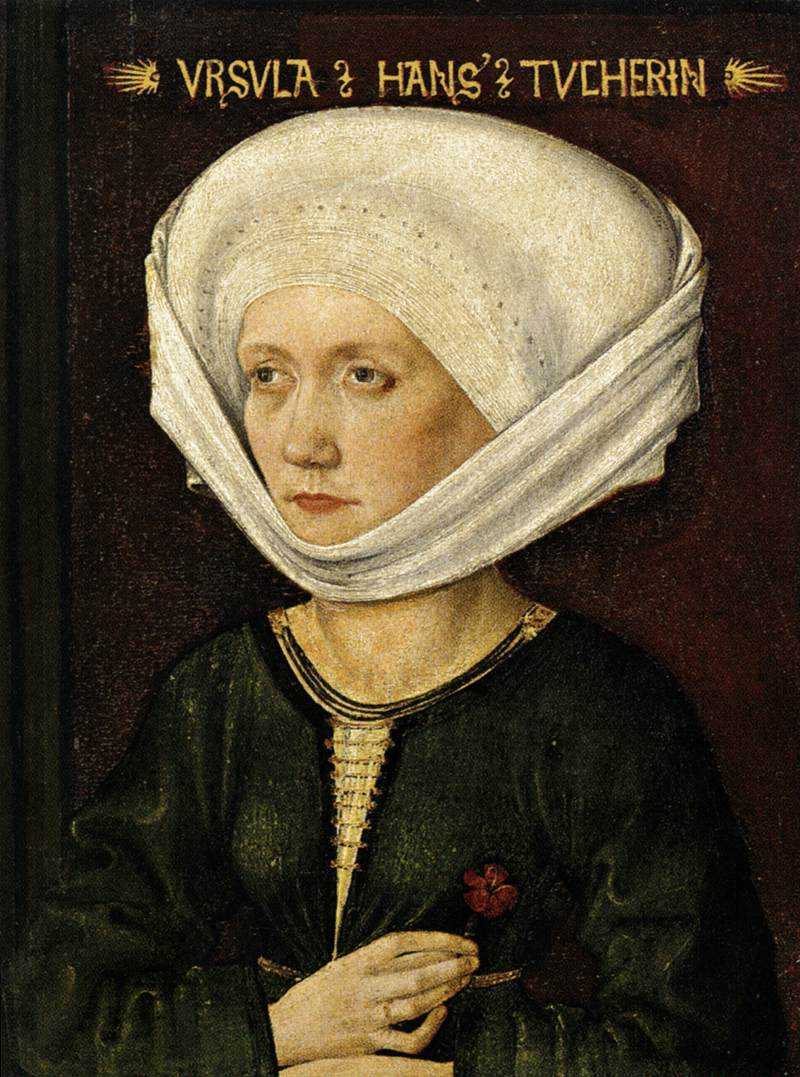
Ursula Tucher née Harsdörffer, wife of Hans

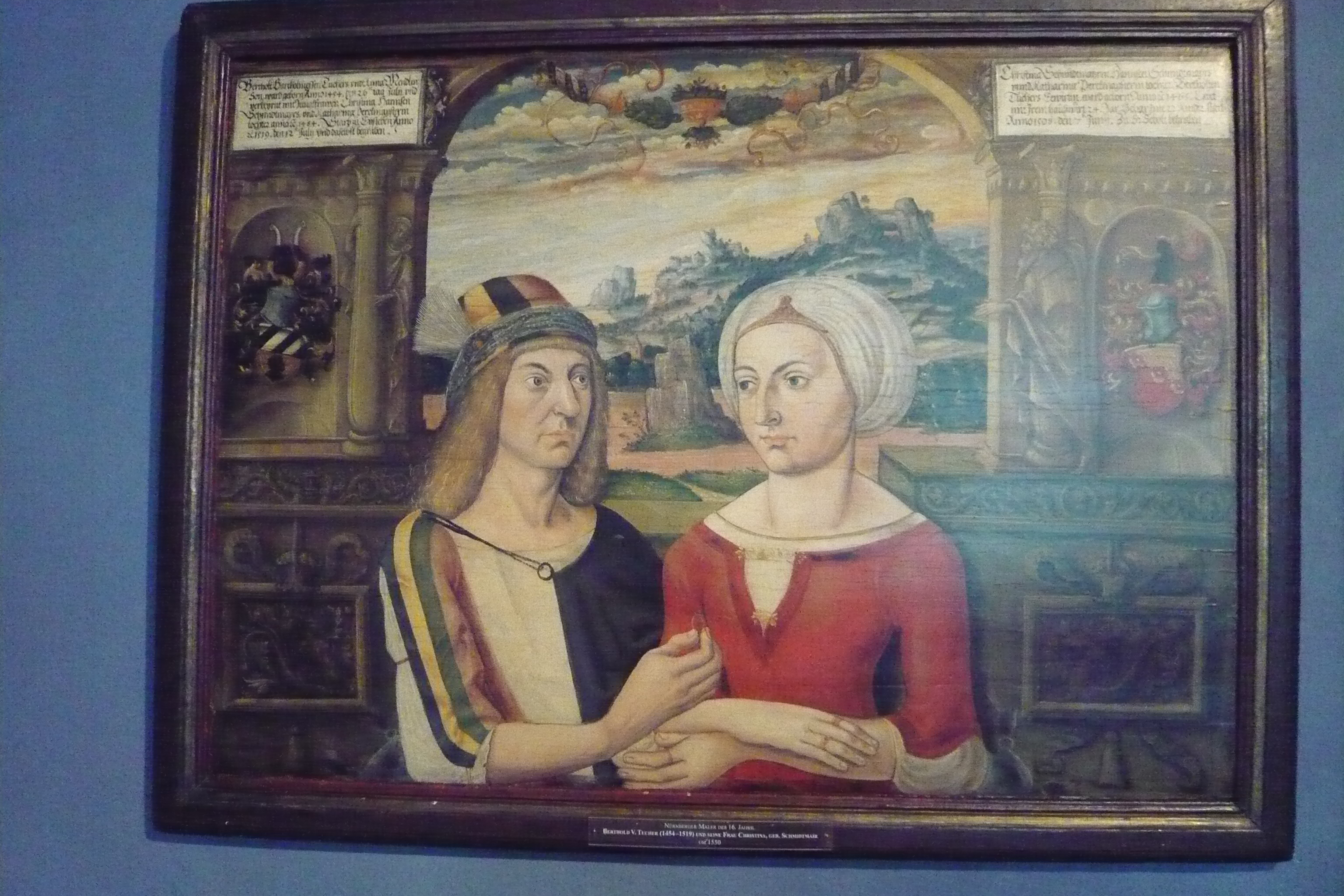
Berthold V. Tucher (1454–1519) and Christine Schmidtmair (ca 1550)

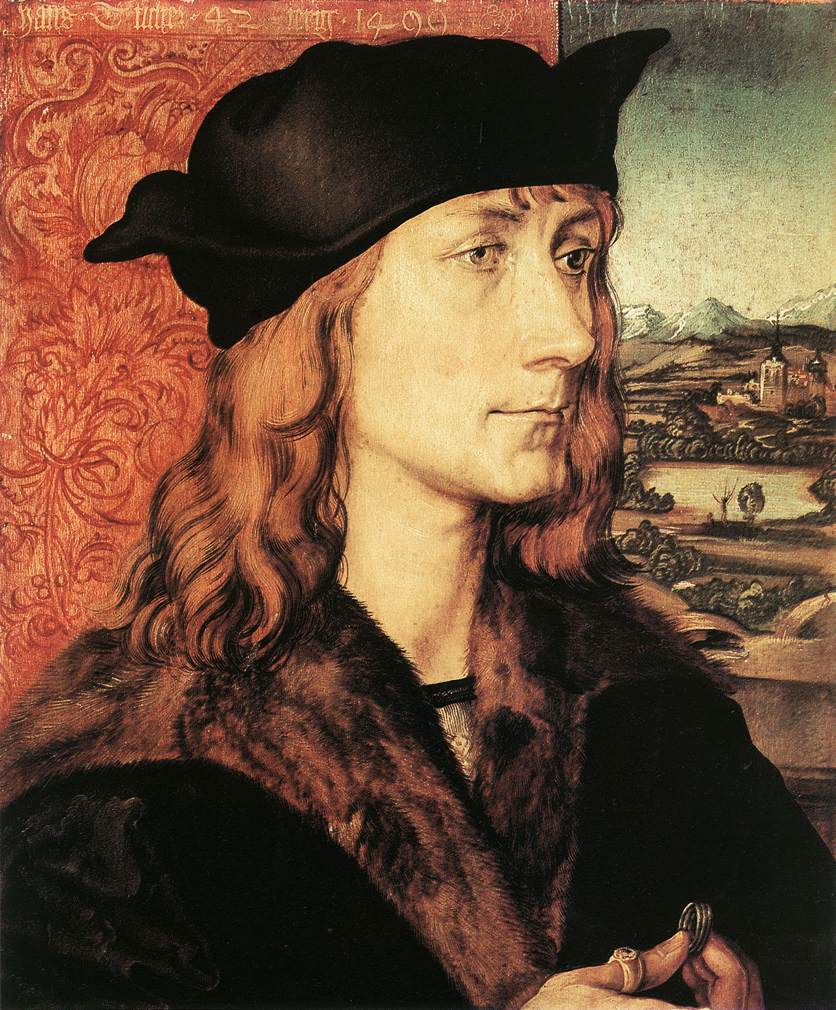
Hans Tucher, by Dürer (1499)

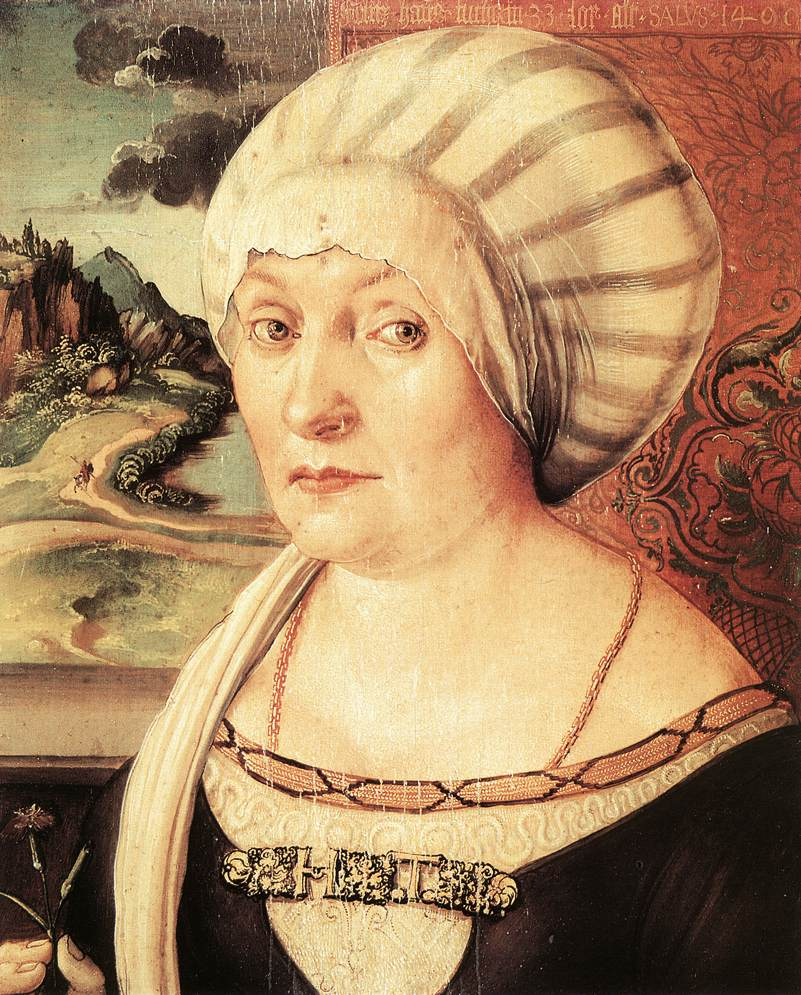
Felicitas Tucher, née Rieter, by Dürer, wife of Hans

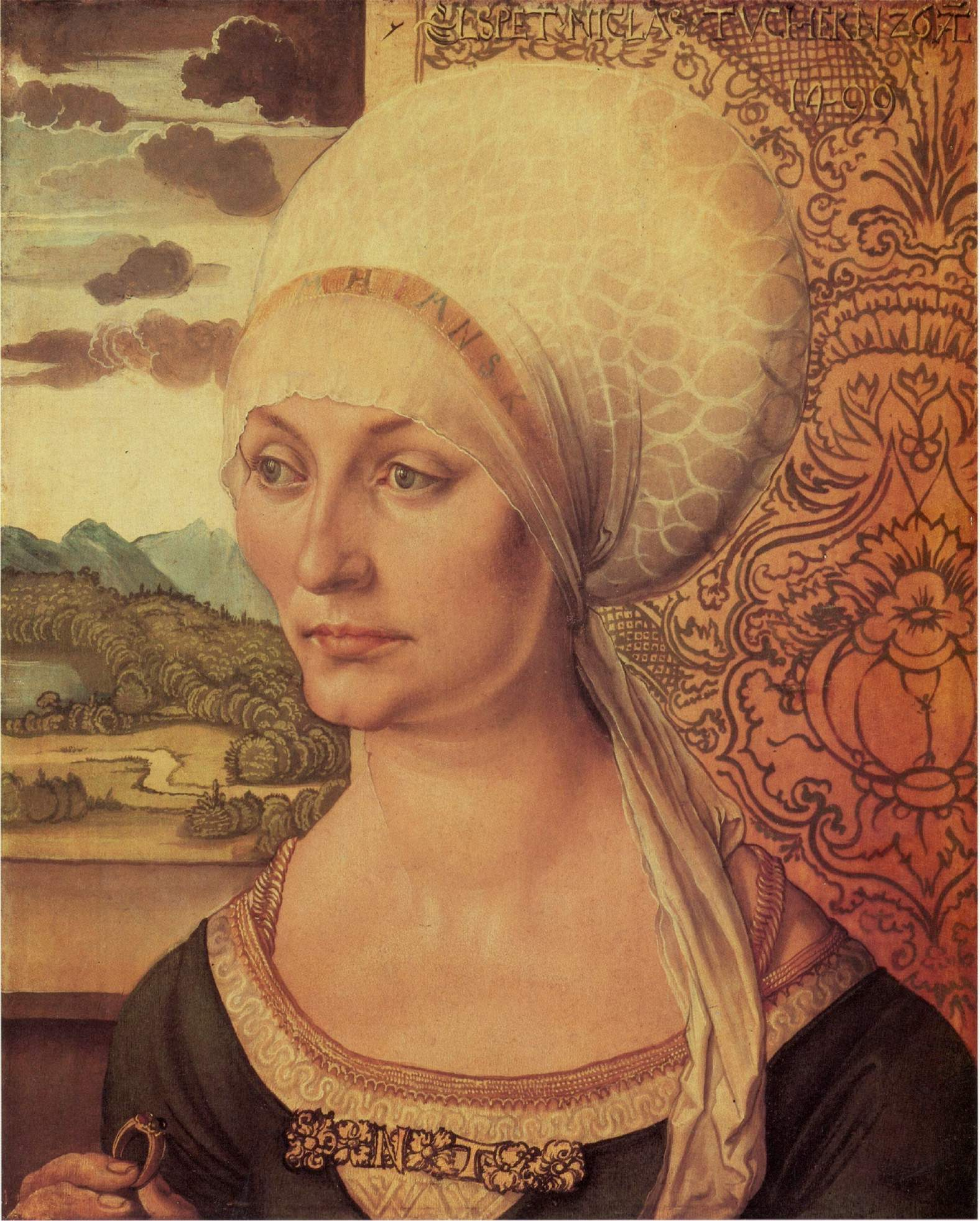
Elsbeth Tucher, née Pusch (1473–1517), by Dürer

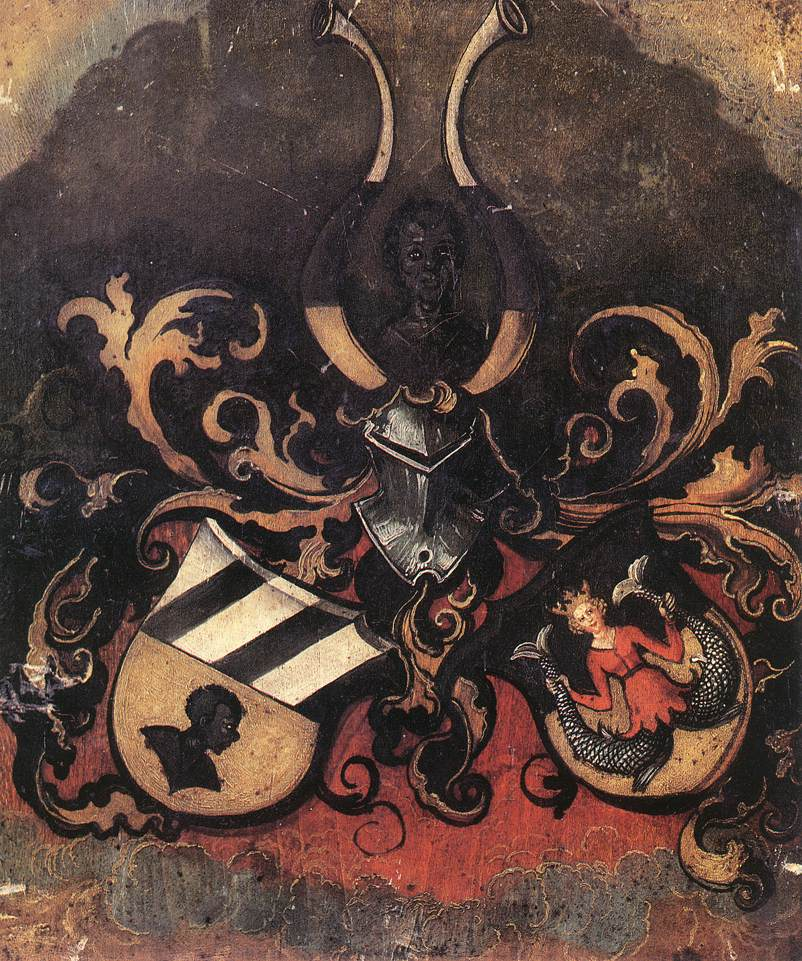
Combined arms of the Tucher and Rieter families, by Dürer (1499)

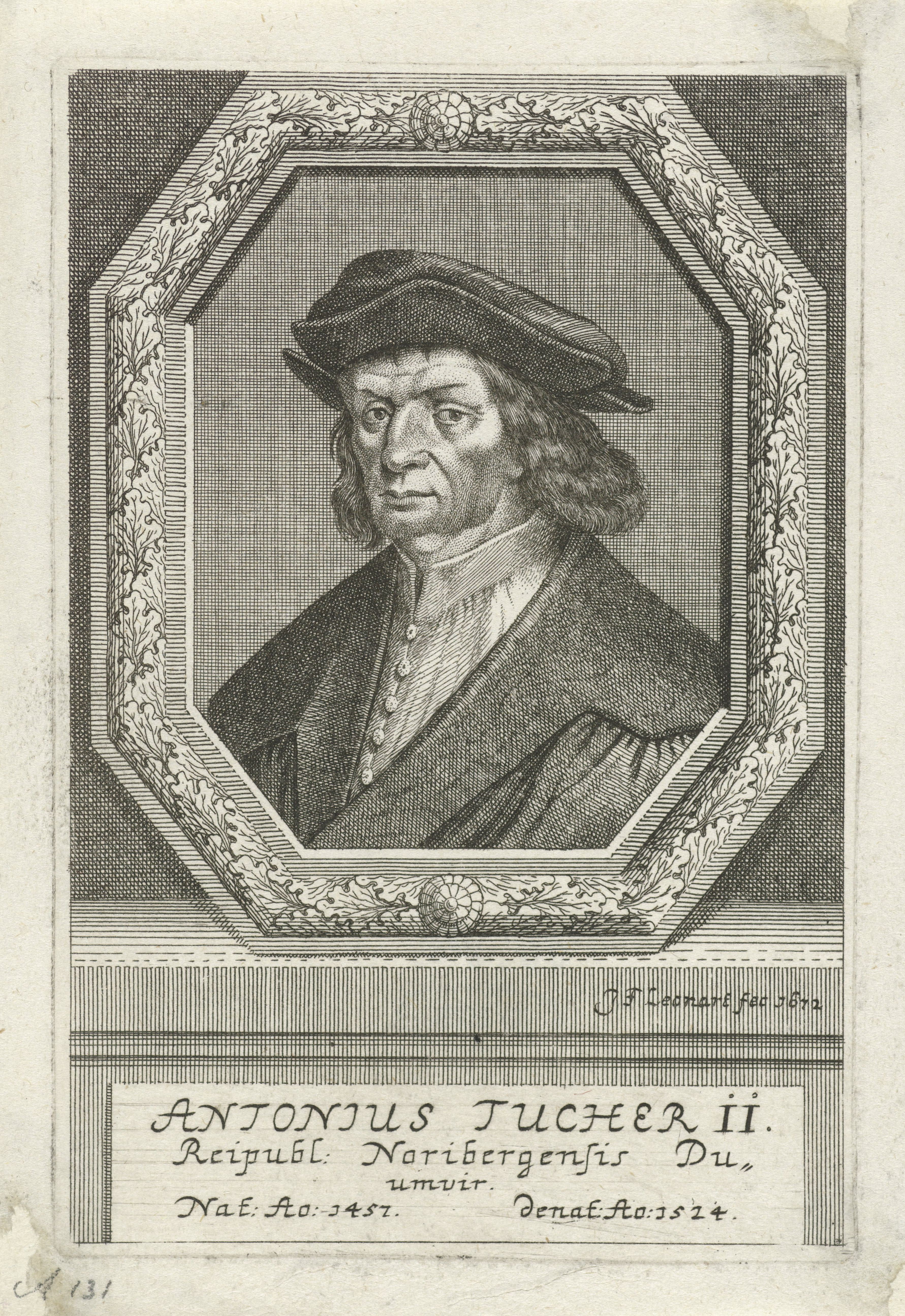
Anton Tucher (1458–1524)

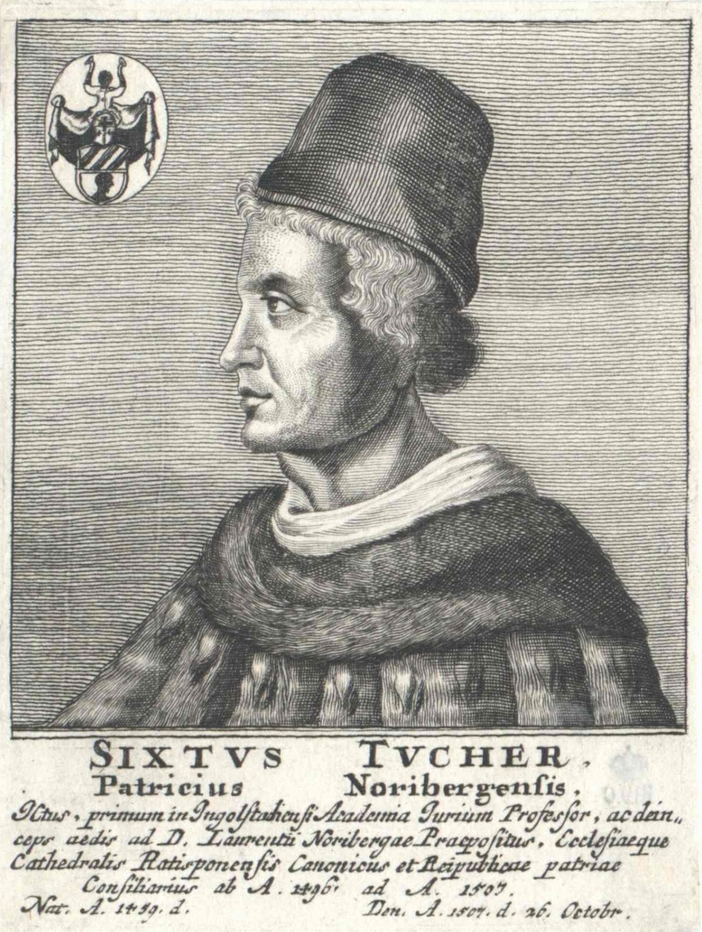
Sixtus Tucher (1459–1507)

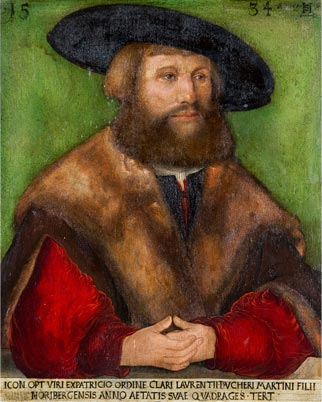
Lorenz II Tucher (1490–1554)

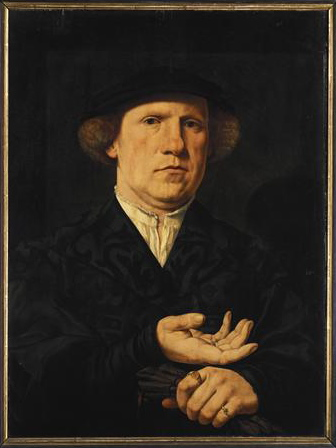
Hieronymus (Jérôme) Tucher (1504–1540), by Jan Cornelisz Vermeyen

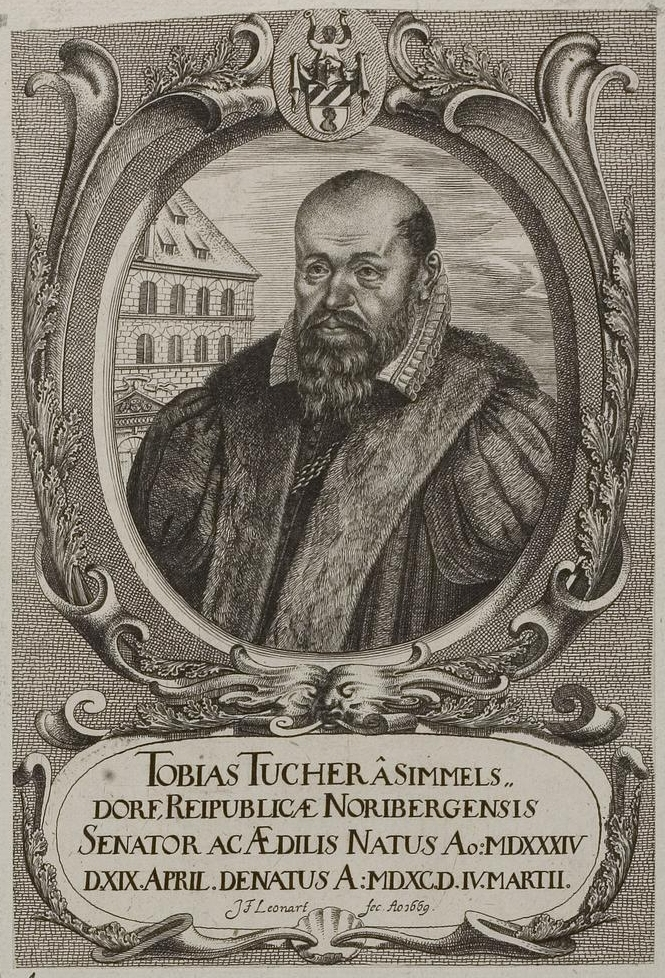
Tobias Tucher (1534–1590)

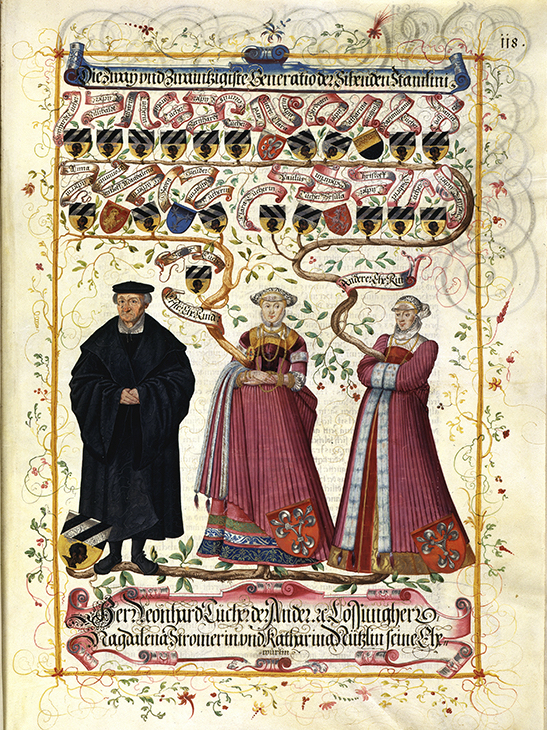
Leonhard II Tucher with 2 wives and children (1590)

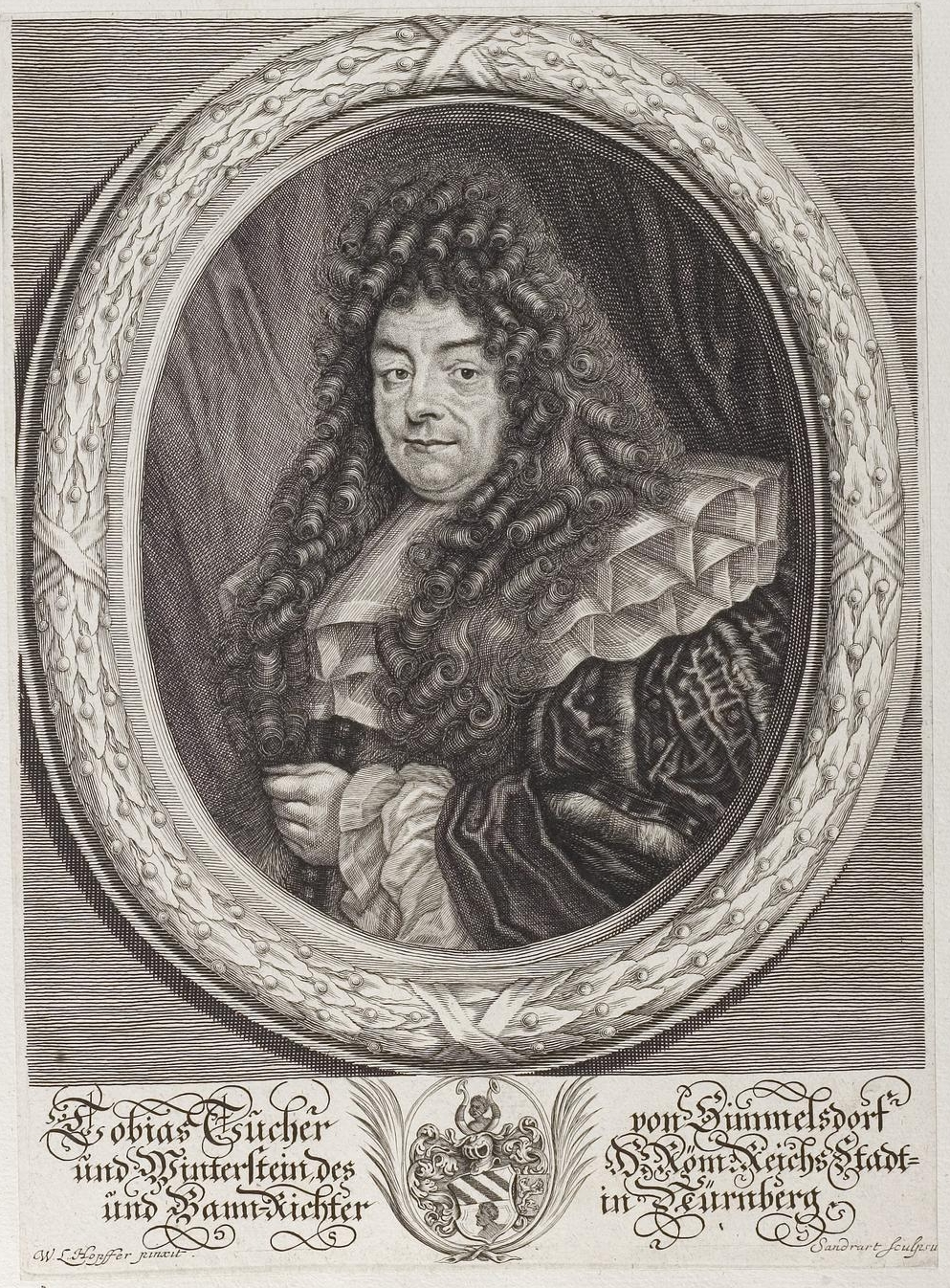
Tobias Tucher (1627–1693), judge

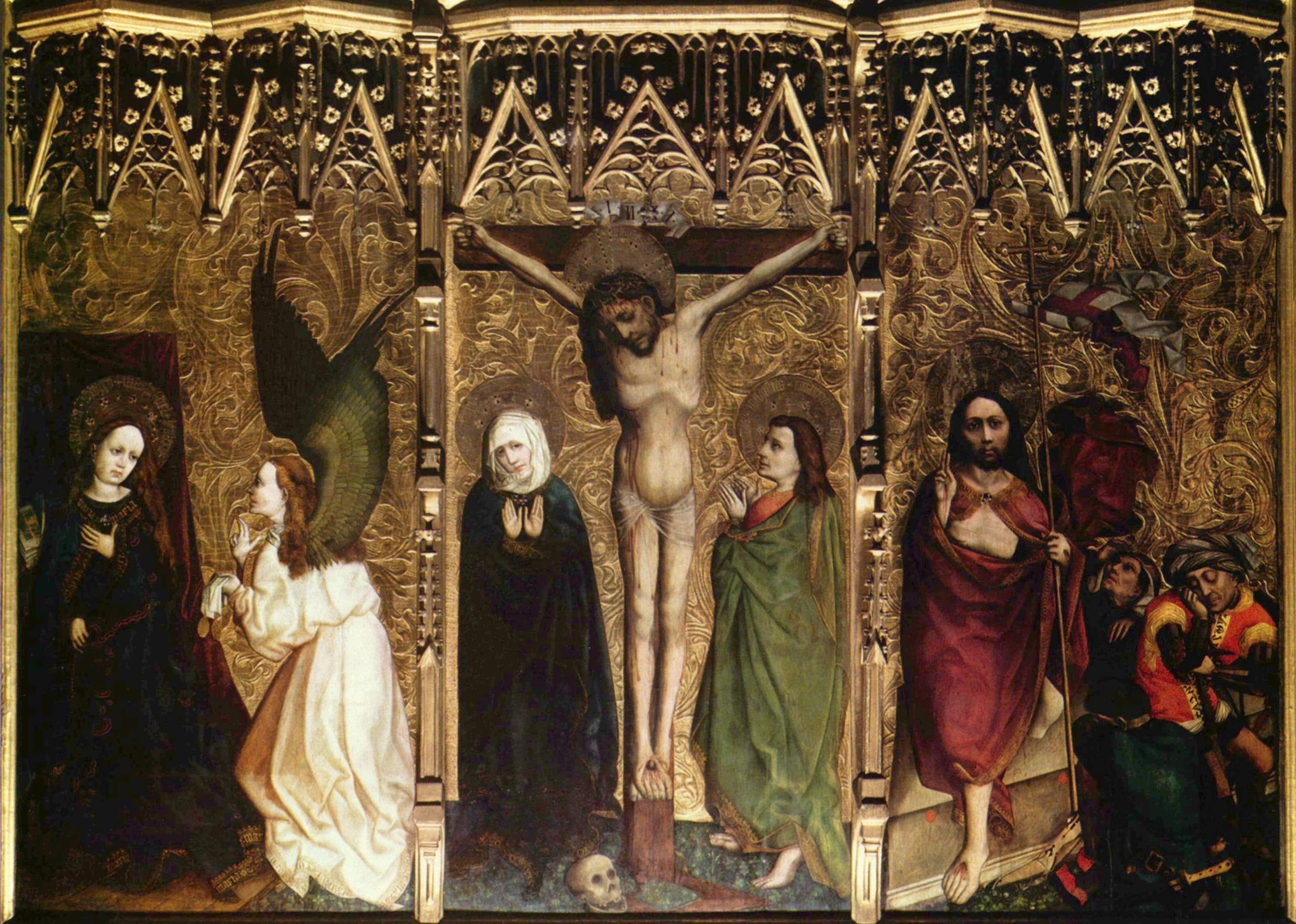
Tucher altar piece, Frauenkirche, Nuremberg (1440), by Master of the Tucher Altarpiece

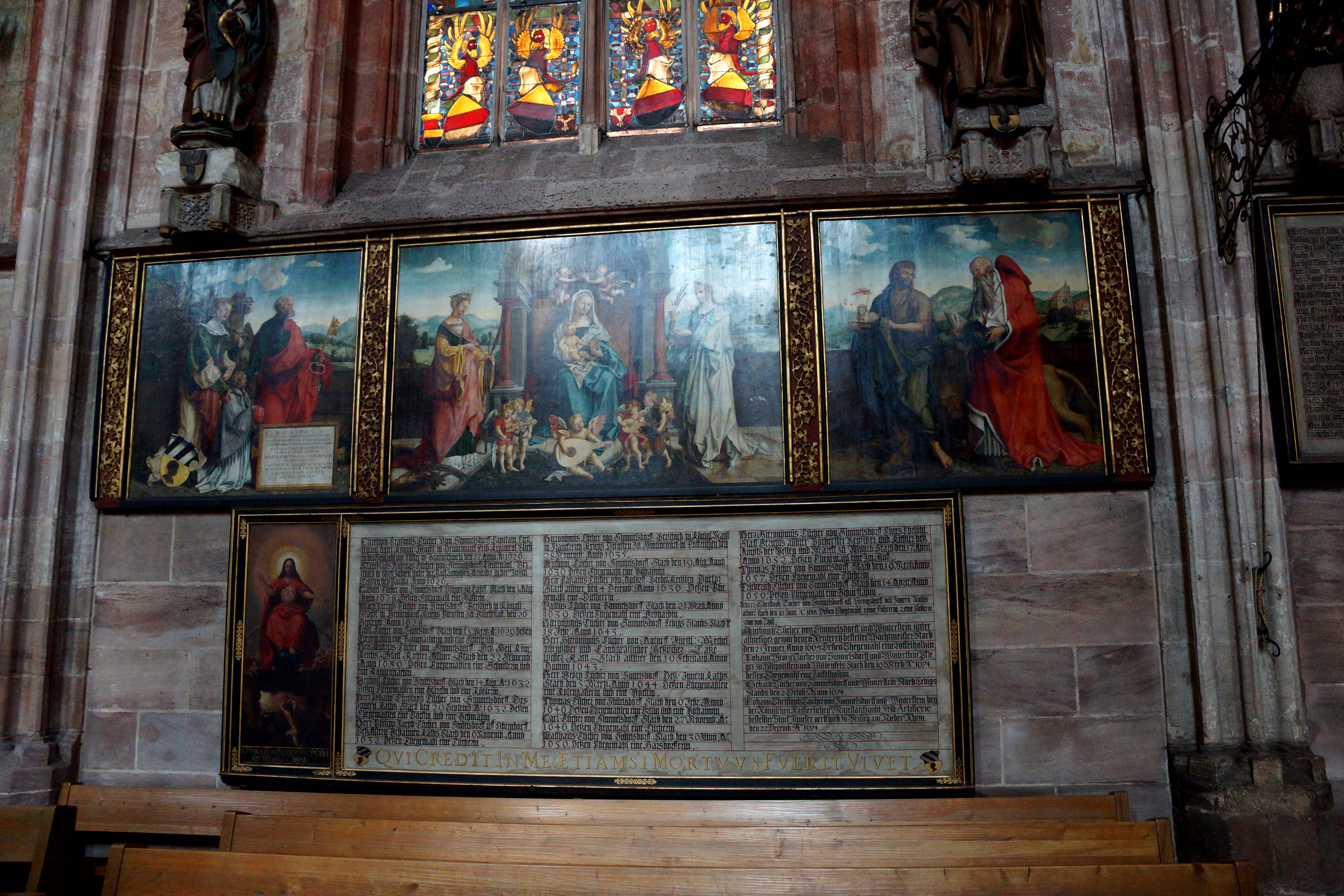
Lorenz Tucher's epitaph, St. Sebaldus Church, Nuremberg, by Hans von Kulmbach (after Dürer's draft), 1513

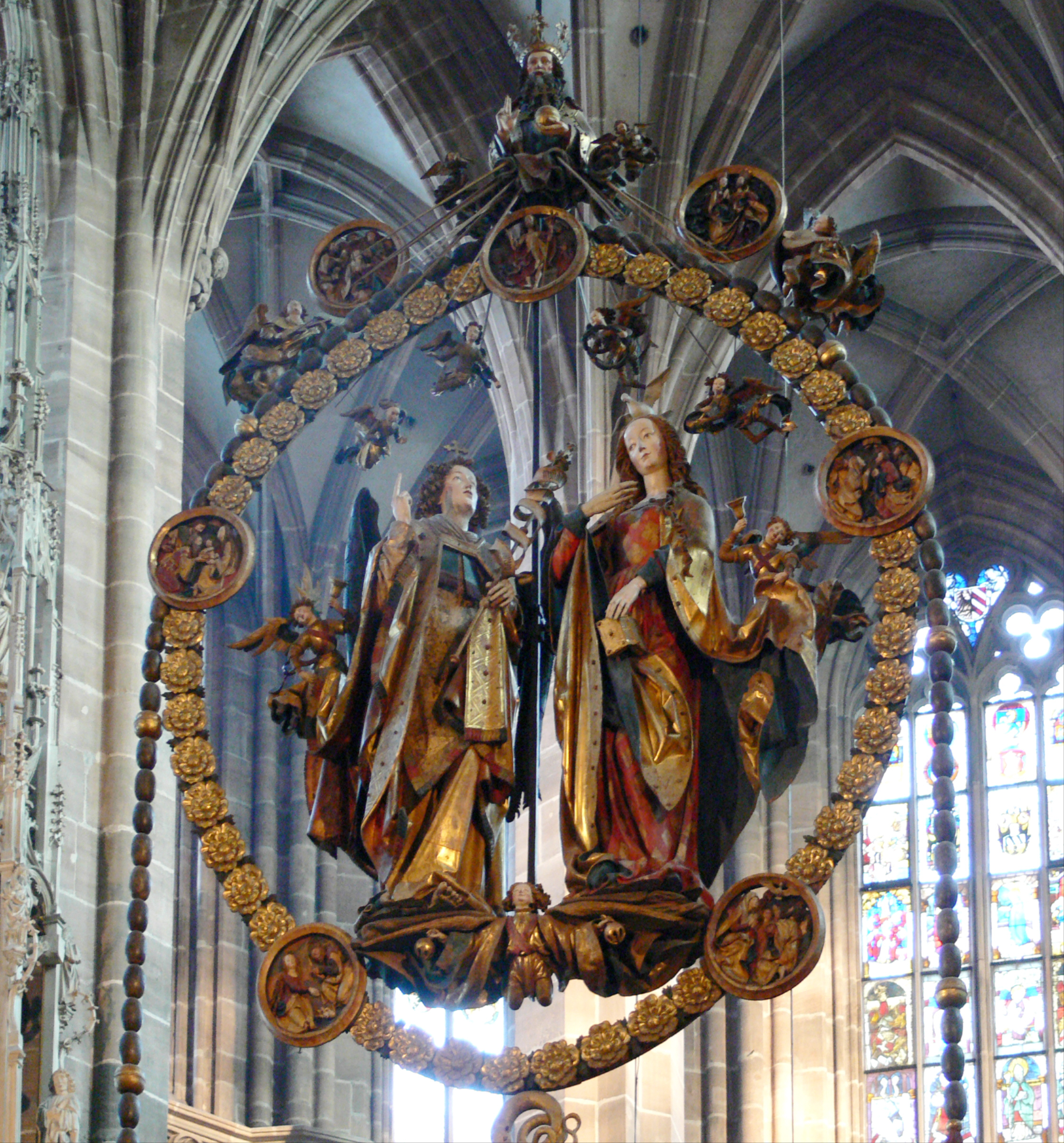
Angelic Salutation (Stoss) by Veit Stoss, commissioned in 1517 by Anton Tucher

== Family tree ==
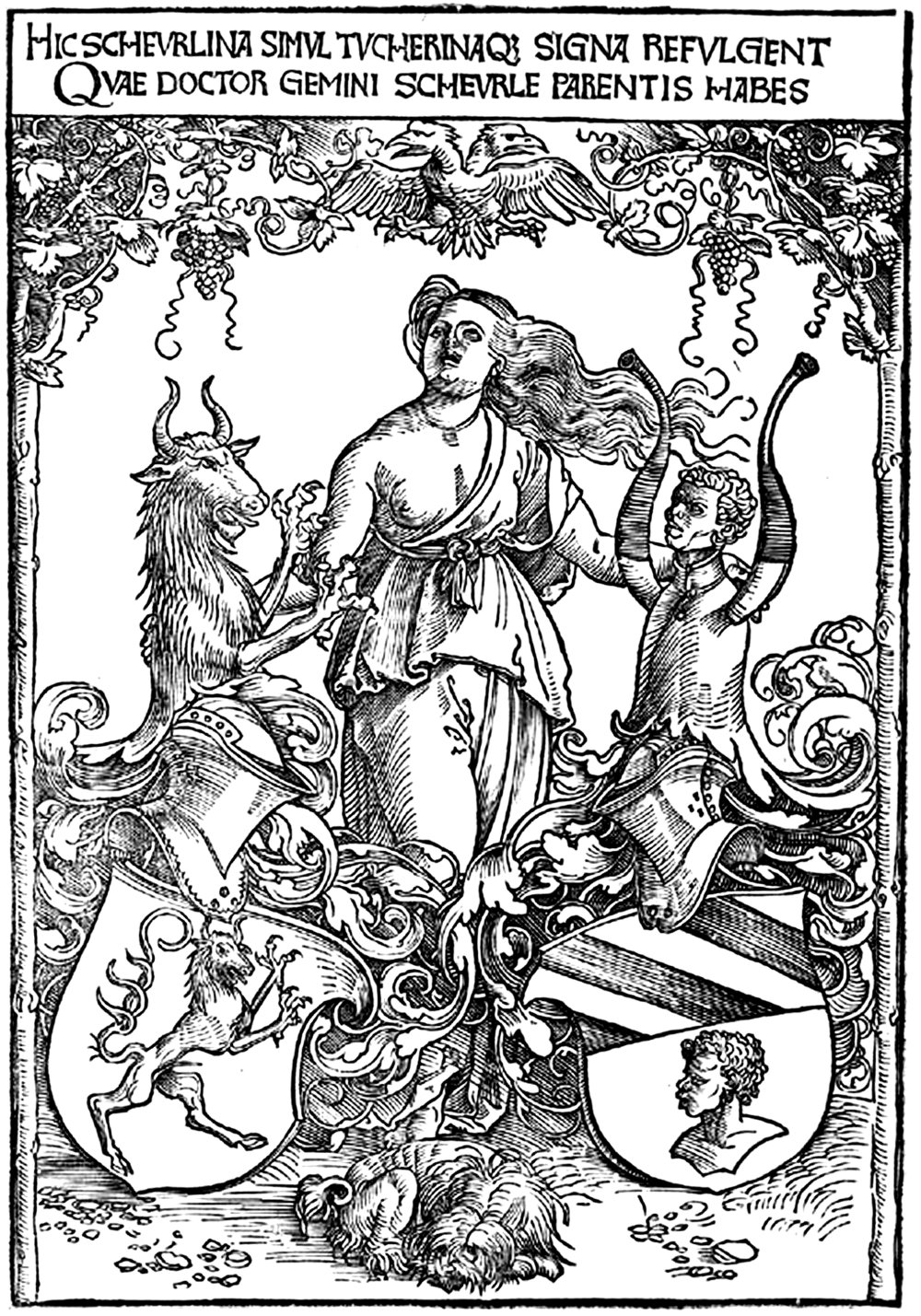
Combined arms of the Tucher and Scheurl families, by Albrecht Dürer, c. 1512

Anton I Tucher von Simmelsdorf, (1412–1476),

  1. Hans XI Tucher von Simmelsdorf, (1456-1536), Called Schnupfer. married in 1482 to Felicitas Rieter, (1466-1514).
  2. Anton II Tucher von Simmelsdorf (1458-1524), Mayor of Nuremberg. and commissioner of the Angelic Salutation.
    1. Lienhardt Tucher von Simmelsdorf, (1524-1568).
  3. Sixtus Tucher von Simmelsdorf, (1459-1507). Married to Anna Reich (died 1493).
    1. Lienhardt II Tucher von Simmelsdorf (1487-1568), married Magdalen Stromer.
  4. Martin Tucher von Simmelsdorf (1460–1528), married to Margareta Imhoff.
    1. Lorenz Tucher von Simmelsdorf (1490–1554)
  5. Nikolaus Tucher von Simmelsdorf (1464-1521), married in 1492 to Elsbeth Pusch,(1473-1517), painted by Durer.

== Flemish branch ==
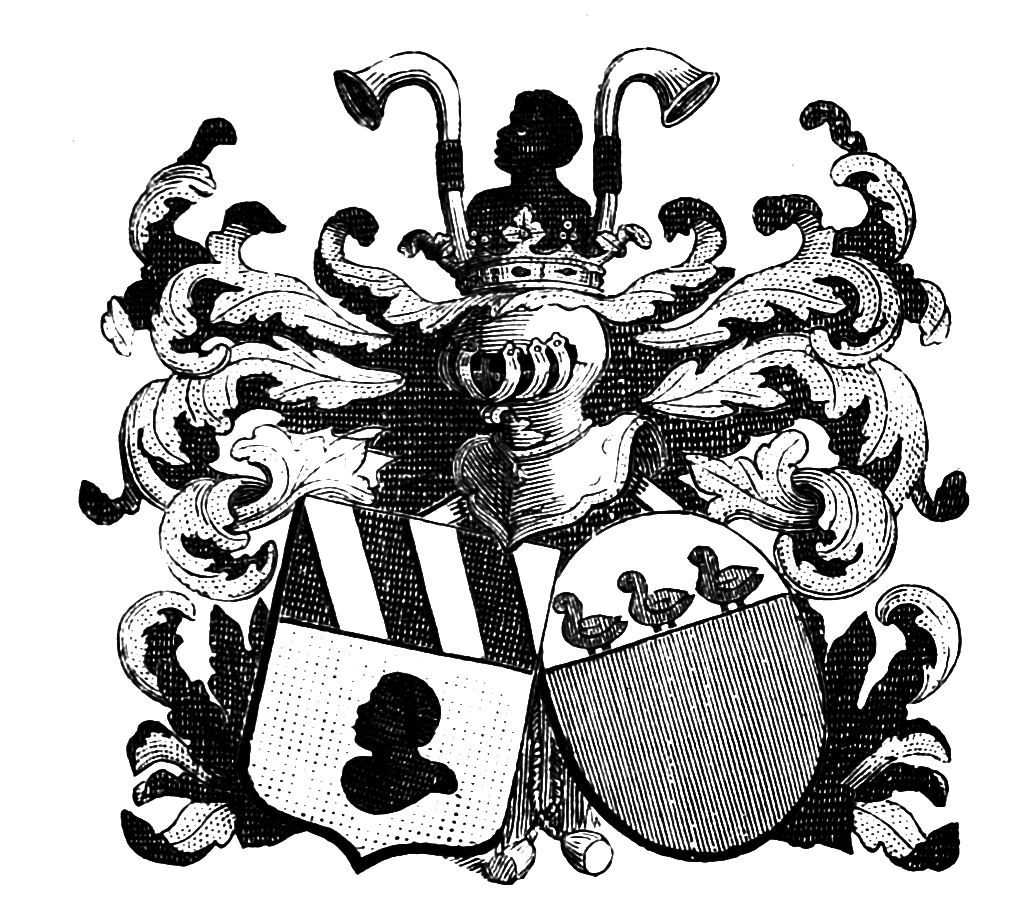
Crest of Tucher and Ursel, St. James' Church, Antwerp

The Flemish branch descends from the branch of Andreas Tucher, his son Berthold Tucher (1454-1519) died in Eisleben and had multiple children whom left Nurnberg and spread in Europe. His eldest son Lazarus moved to Antwerp. His descendants belonged to the most powerful people of Antwerp and became mayors. His descendants married into important Flemish families, and resided in Tanghof Castle, Kontich.

1. Lazarus I Tucher von Simmelsdorf, (1492-1563), son of Berthold : imperial conseiller. Married to Jacqueline Coquiel (sister of Charles de Cocquiel).
  1. Ambrosius Tucher, knight. Married Mary of Ursel, daughter of Lancelot II of Ursel.
    1. Robert I Tucher, mayor (alderman) of Antwerp, married Jullianne of Schetz, niece of Erasmus II Schetz.
      1. Jean I Tucher, (1586-1605). Died in Leuven.
      2. Robert II Tucher, (1587-), knighted, Lord mayor of Antwerp. Married to Marie Catherine of Berchem.
        1. Joannes II Antonius Tucher: Lord Mayor of Antwerp, marr. Maria Susanne de Cordes, daughter of Jean Charles de Cordes, Lord of Wichelen, Reeth and Waerloos; 3rd marriage to dame Isabelle de Robiano.
          1. Joannes III Robrecht Tucher, died without heirs.
          2. Marie-Antoinette Balthine Tucher, marr. don Juan Francisco de Santa Cruz, Lord of Boortmerbeecke, Buried inside St-James, Antwerp.
      3. Charles Tucher, ( 1588-1591)
      4. Marie Tucher, (1589-1594)
      5. Lazarus III Tucher, (1590)
      6. Lancelot Tucher, (1591-1601)
      7. Conrard Tucher, (1592)
  2. Lazarus II Tucher, marr. Barbara Dammant.
  3. Anna Tucher, marr. Ruprecht Haller von Hallerstein (1533-1560).

== See also ==
- Master of the Tucher Altarpiece
