= Angelic Salutation (Stoss) =

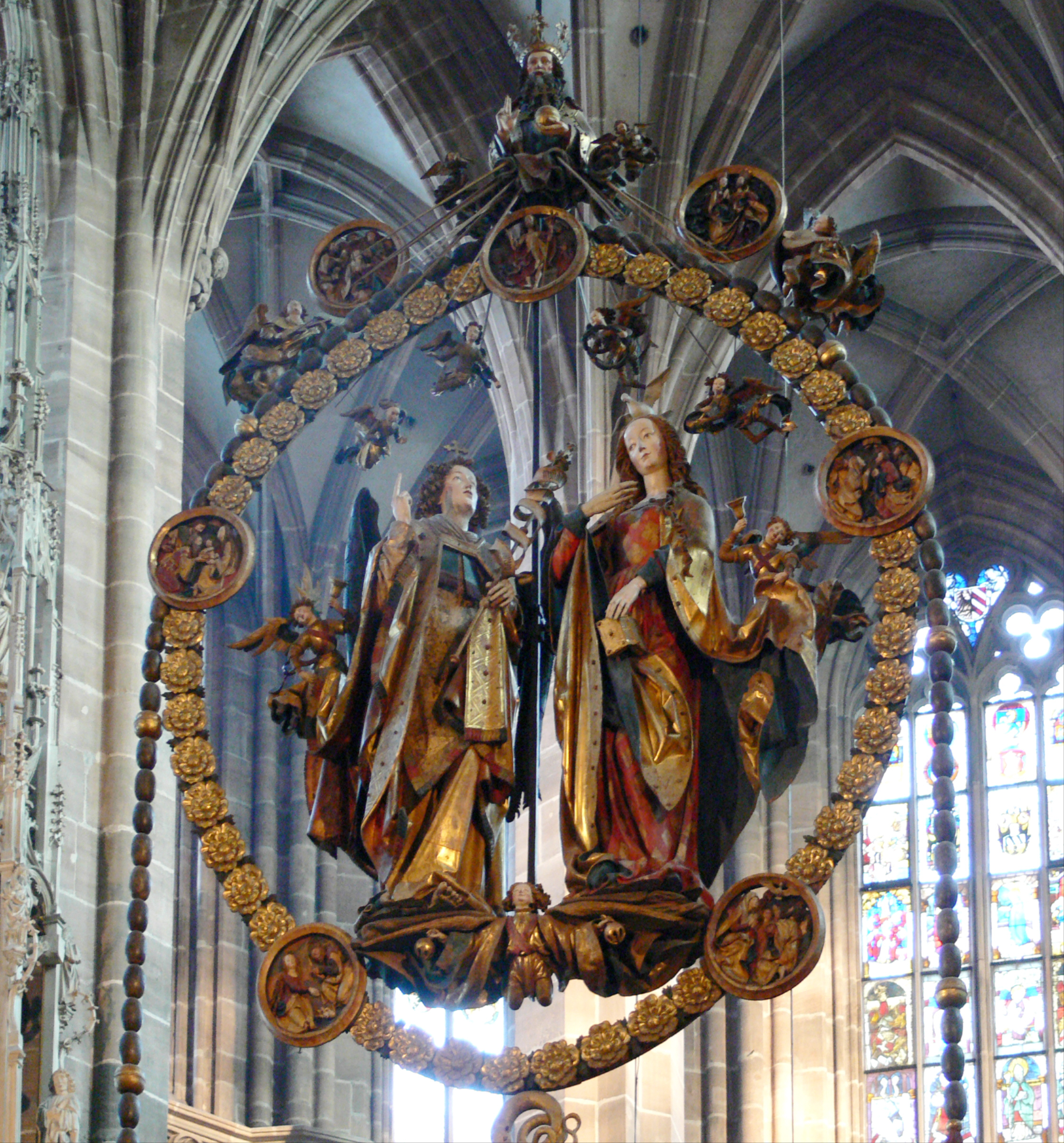
Angelic Salutation .

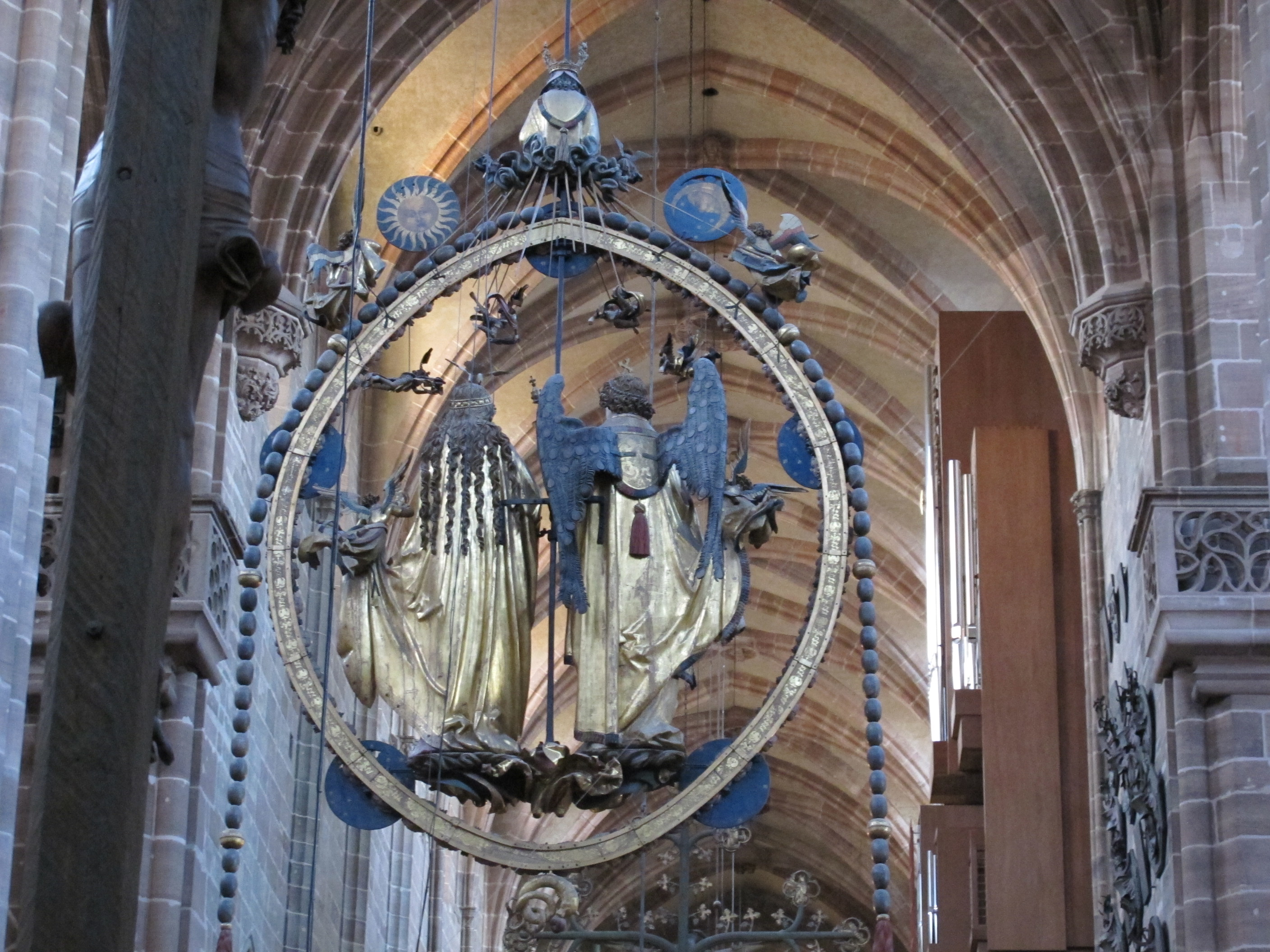
View from the rear.

Angelic Salutation (German: Engelsgruß) is an assemblage of life-sized limewood sculptures celebrating the Annunciation by the late-Gothic German artist Veit Stoss. It was commissioned in 1517 by Anton II Tucher and completed the following year. Tucher was a high-ranking official in Nuremberg in southern Germany, and donated the work to the medieval church of St. Lorenz (or St. Lawrence) in Nuremberg, where it is still freely suspended on a metal chain in the centre of the choir, facing the high altar.

== Description ==
The sculptures are dominated by the life-sized figures of Virgin Mary and Archangel Gabriel, from whom the work takes its name. They are suspended within a circular frame resembling a wreath of roses, that represent the rosary of the Annunciation. Angelic Salutation' is widely regarded as Stoss' masterpiece. Mary and Gabriel are surrounded by a series of small angels, many of whom are ringing bells or playing musical instruments. The statues are suspended within the encircling frame of a wreath of roses embedded with eight medallions illustrating scenes from both the Life of the Virgin and Life of Christ.

Stoss created a large gilded crown to hang over the frame, but this is now lost. Tucher commissioned craftsman Jakob Pulmann to design and install an iron candelabra holding a miniature statue of Mary in order to illuminate Stoss's work.

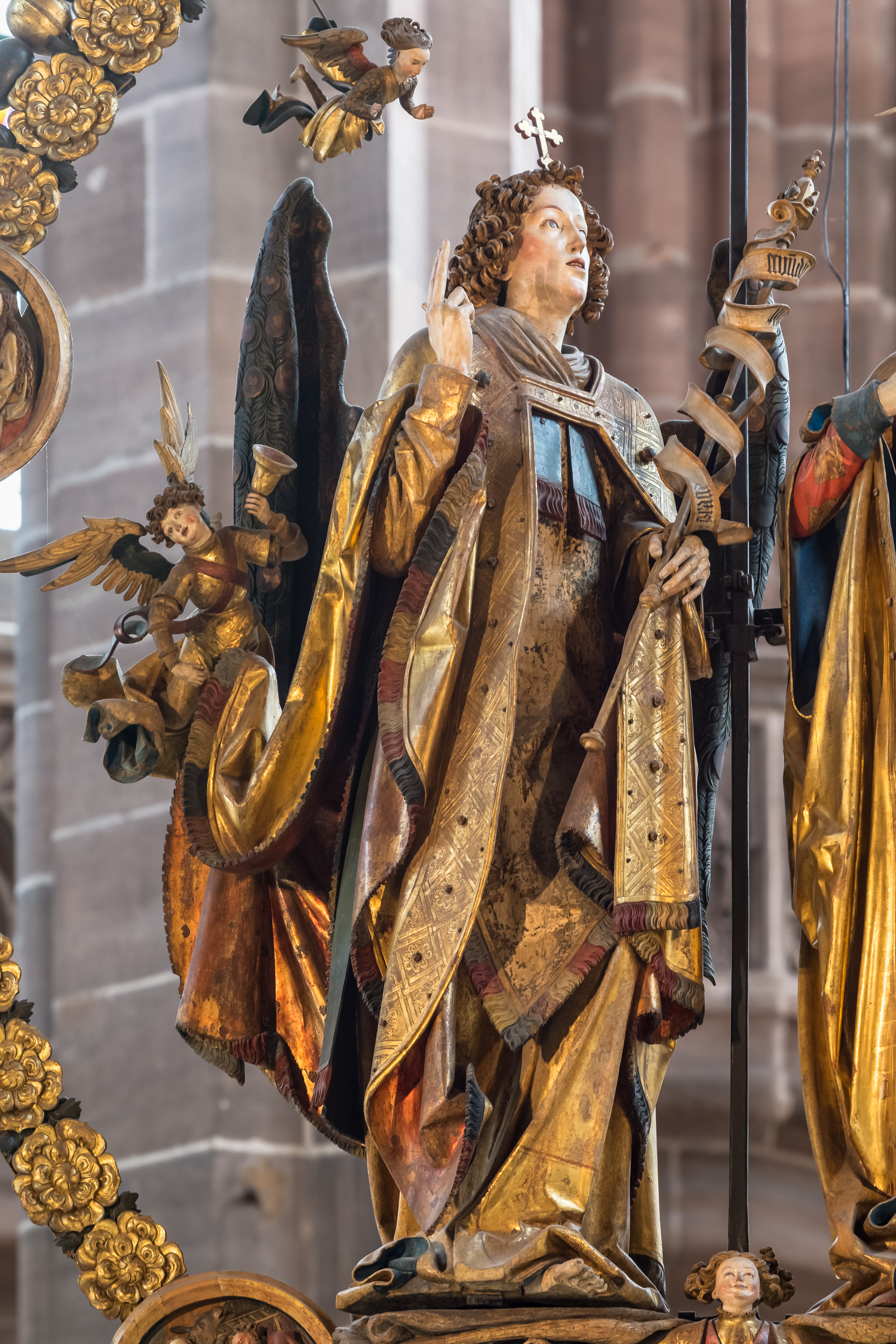
Gabriel

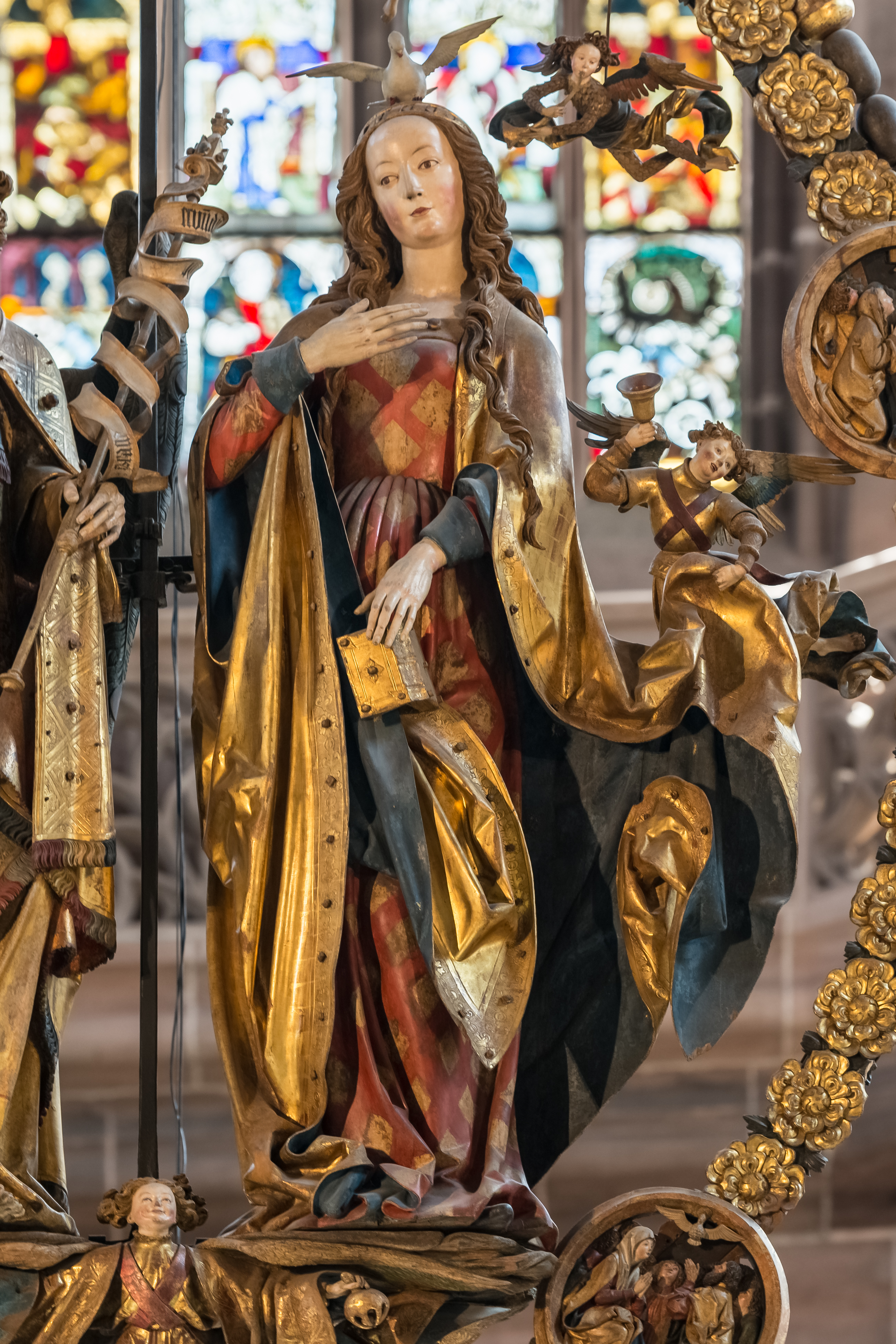
Mary

== Provenance ==
The ensemble was commissioned in 1517 by the German merchant, city councillor and treasurer Anton Tucher as a devotional centerpiece for those reciting the rosary or other Marian devotions. Tucher employed Albrecht Dürer to review the quality of the piece before final payment was determined and made to Stoss. It was completed on the eve of the German Reformation, when Lutheran reformers introduced ideas of iconoclasm as they began to question both the need for, and purpose of religious art.

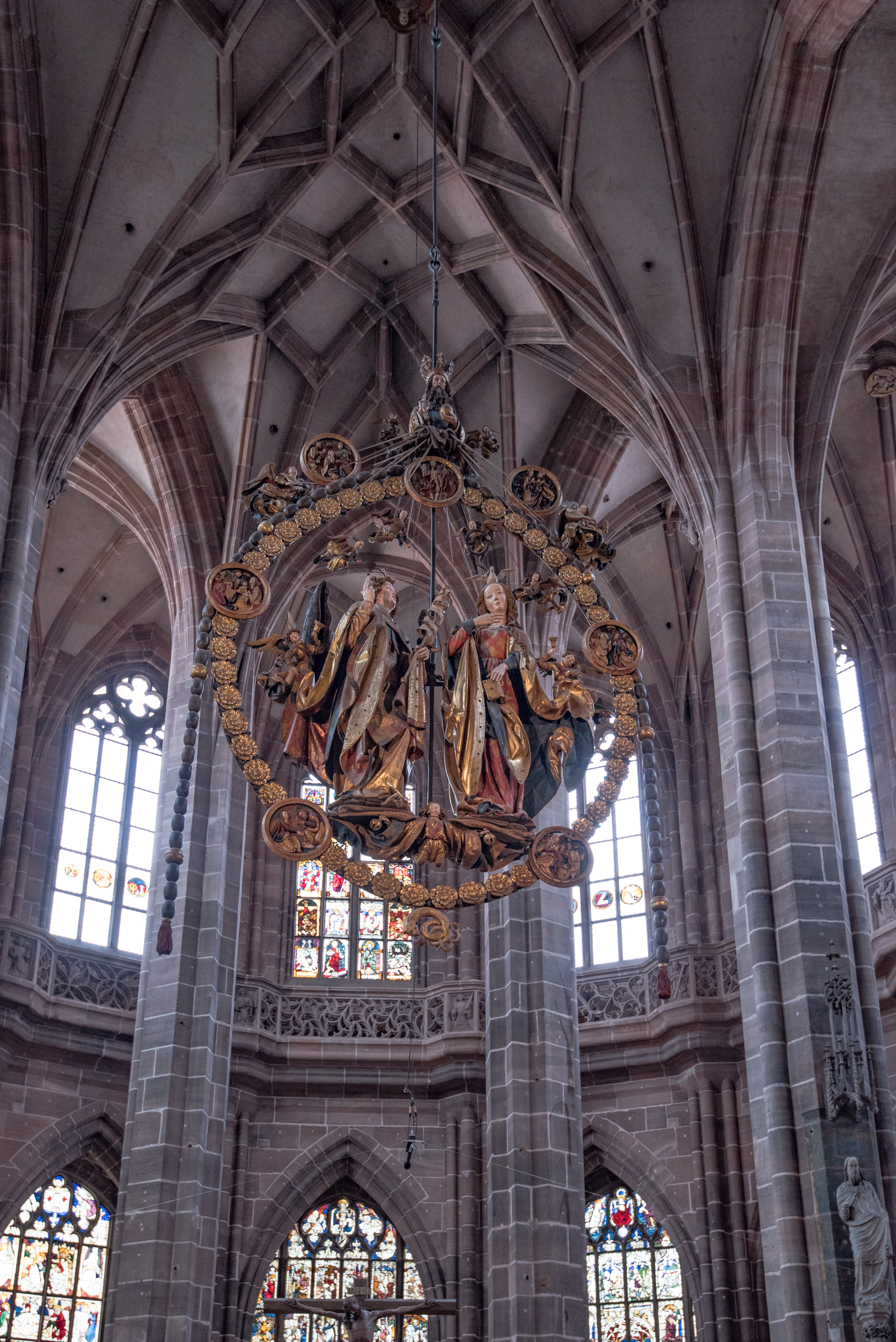
View

In 1525 Tucher and the city split from the Catholic church in favour of Lutheranism. From 1519 a green fabric was placed over the work, and it was allowed to be uncovered only on holy days. It had long been thought that the covering was imposed by iconoclasts; however, the 20th-century discovery of a document drawn up by Tucher mentions payment for the cloth, indicating that the shroud was part of the original design. In 1529 it stopped being uncovered for Church holidays. A 1756 record reveals that because the Lutheran theologian Andreas Osiander "preached against this image and called the Mary a golden milk-maid a green coverage was made for it."

In the late 1520s Angelic Salutation was seen as merely devotional with no liturgical purpose; it celebrated Mary rather than Jesus and was centred on the rosary, which fell out of favour with the Lutherans. It was expensive to maintain, and it was argued that the money paid for its upkeep could be better spent providing for the poor. Because the work was deemed the private property of the wealthy and influential Tucher family, it mostly escaped destruction. Generally, in post-Reformation Germany, religious art commissioned by nobility was spared if it was taken into private collection. Yet the Angelic Salutation was allowed to remain - albeit shrouded - in a public area, an indication of the city of Nuremberg's pride in its heritage. Only the crown was disassembled and demolished, and the centrepiece covered and largely decommissioned.

The work was further threatened when it was described as "a disgrace to Nuremberg". At one point, a collection was made to replace the metal suspension with a hemp one to reduce costs. However, in 1817 this rope broke. It was not until the end of the 19th century that the Angelic Salutation was permanently uncovered and opened to the public.

== Sources ==
- Brockmann, Stephen. Nuremberg: The Imaginary Capital. London: Camden House, 2006. ISBN 1-5711-3345-3
- Burkhard, Arthur. "Veit Stoss, German Sculptor". Speculum, vol. 10, No. 1, 1935. JSTOR 2848233
- Heal, Bridget. The Cult of the Virgin Mary in Early Modern Germany. Cambridge: Cambridge University Press, 2007. ISBN 0-5218-7103-4
- Nash, Susie. Northern Renaissance art. Oxford: Oxford University Press, 2008. ISBN 978-0-19-284269-5
- Smith, Jeffrey Chipps. The Northern Renaissance. London: Phaidon Press, 2004. ISBN 0-7148-3867-5
