= Adam Kraft =

German sculptor (c. 1406 – 1509)

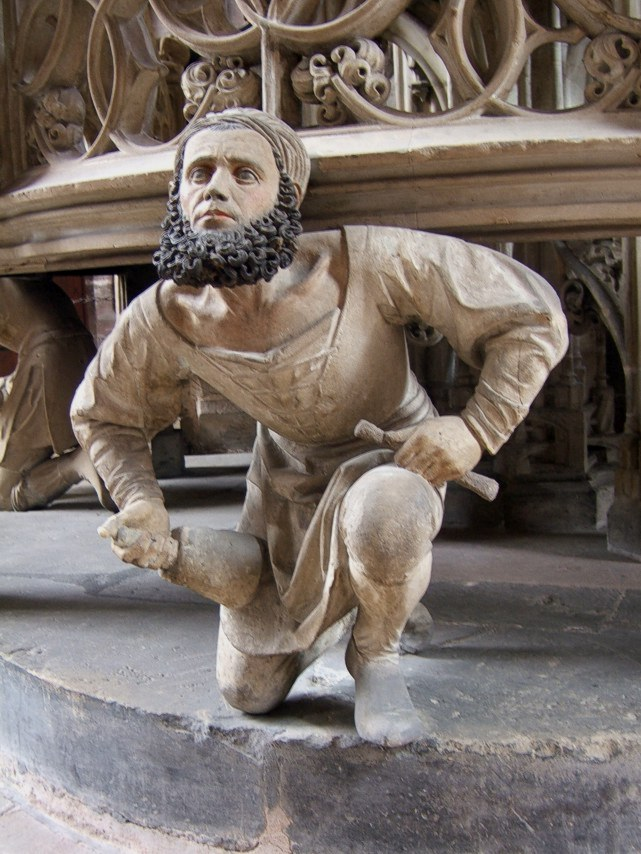
Nuremberg sculptor Adam Kraft, self-portrait from St Lorenz Church, 1490s

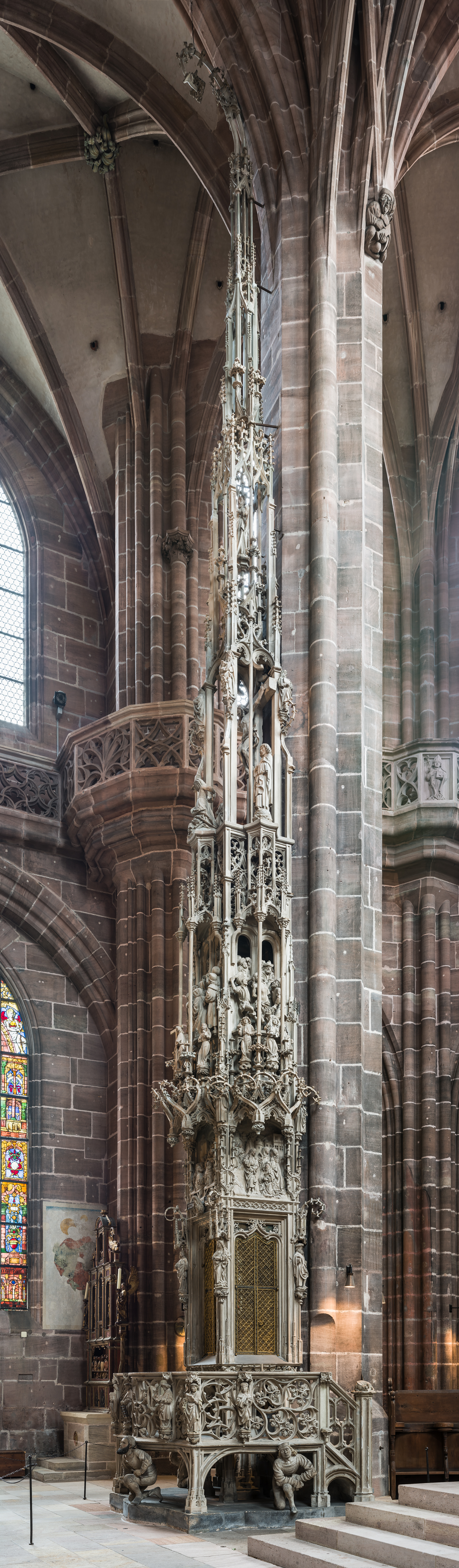
St. Lorenz hall choir including the sacrament house by Adam Kraft

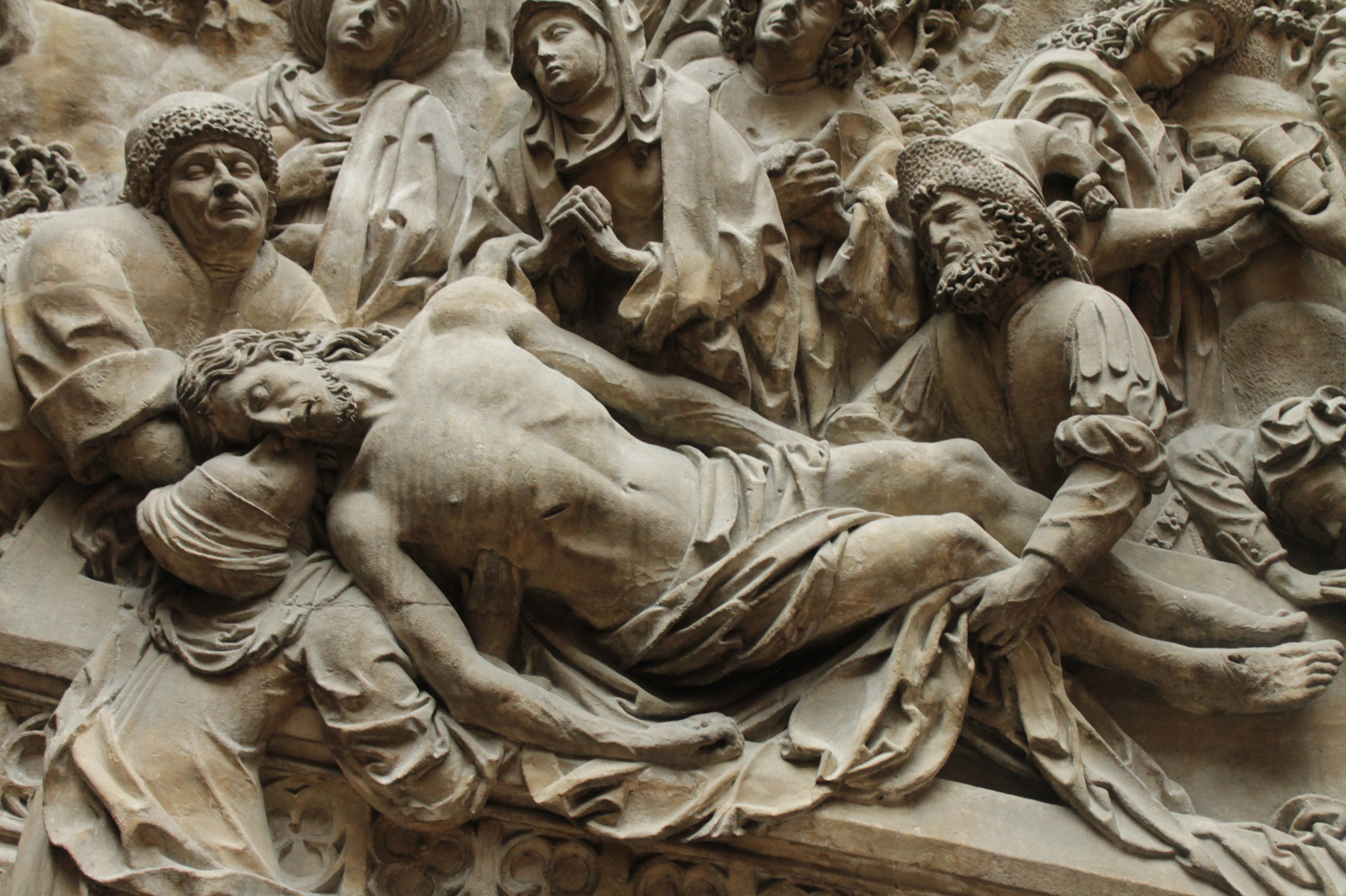
Detail of monument from Nuremberg by Adam Kraft, Victoria and Albert Museum

Adam Kraft (or Krafft) (c. 1460? – January 1509) was a German stone sculptor and master builder of the late Gothic period, based in Nuremberg and with a documented career there from 1490.

It is not known where Kraft was born and raised; his hand has been claimed to be evident as an assistant in works in Ulm Minster (completed 1471) and the pulpit at Strasbourg Cathedral, completed in 1485. Kraft is believed to have married twice, but is not known to have produced any children. All his known works are in stone, but he may also have carved unidentified pieces in wood.

His masterpiece is considered to be the 18.7 meters (61 feet) tall tabernacle at St. Lorenz, Nuremberg. The tabernacle, that has the shape of a gothic tower reaching into the church's vault, is made up of tracery interspersed with figural scenes from Christ's Passion and was commissioned in 1493 by Hans Imhoff, a patrician from Nuremberg. The contract for the commission was preserved and stipulates details about the execution and finish of the work. The stone tower, which is supported by three figures, was lightly damaged during World War II and restored afterwards. One of the supporting figures is a self-portrait by Kraft (at right). Another important work is a huge relief of 1490-92 depicting the Crucifixion, Entombment of Christ, and Resurrection of Christ, on the exterior of St. Sebaldus Church, Nuremberg.

Kraft is believed to have completed all of his sculpting work in Nuremberg and its environs in Bavaria, between the years 1490 and 1509, working with only a small complement of two or three assistants. His other significant works were the monumental reliefs in the various churches in Nuremberg. He produced the great Schreyer monument in 1492 for St. Sebaldus Church and Christ bearing the Cross above the altar of the same church. He also made various works for public and private buildings, such as the relief over the door of the Wagehaus, a Saint George and the Dragon, several Madonnas, and other purely decorative pieces. The great tabernacle, covered in statuettes, in Ulm Minster, and the very spirited Stations of the Cross, on the road to the Nuremberg cemetery, are also his.

He is buried in nearby Schwabach. Many of his pieces are exhibited at the Nuremberg museum, the Germanisches Nationalmuseum.
