= Mathes Roriczer =

German master mason (c.1435–1495)

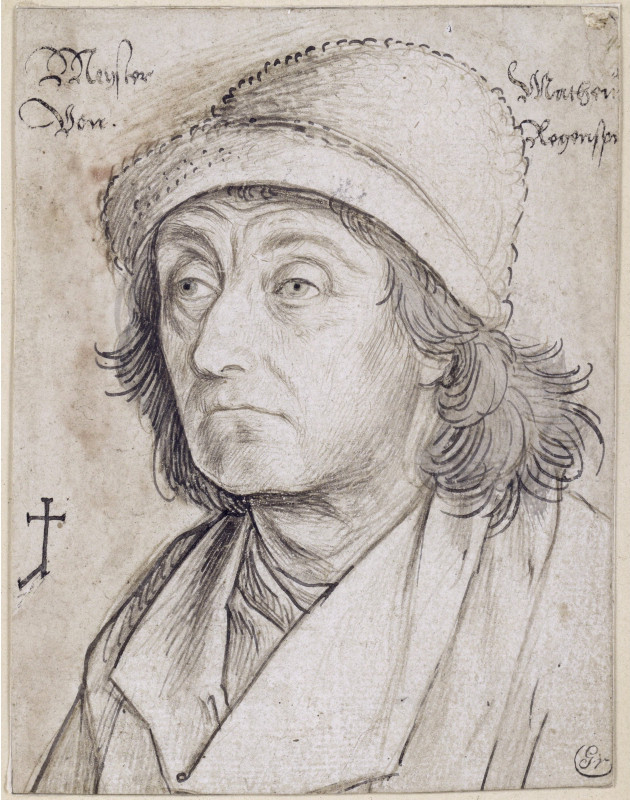
Mathes Roriczer

Mathes Roriczer, also Matthäus Roritzer (approximate dates 1435–1495), was a 15th-century German architect and author of several surviving booklets on medieval architectural design.

Born into a family of master builders, Roriczer progressed to the position of master builder of cathedrals, or Baudommeister and in this role contributed to the Regensburg and Eichstätt Cathedrals, and St. Lorenz Church of Nuremberg. While in Regensburg he printed broadsheets and also published several of his own works. It is one of his texts, Büchlein von der Fialen Gerechtigkeit or Booklet Concerning Pinnacle Correctitude, that is sometimes credited with revealing the craft secrets of the German medieval master masons. It is more likely that no such secrecy existed, and that the scarcity of contemporary writing combined with the rules that prevented masons from working for a non-trained builder have given this erroneous impression.

There exists a portrait of Mathes Roriczer by Hans Holbein the Elder.

== Family ==
Roriczer's father was Konrad Roriczer, the Tummaister (or "Cathedral Architect") of Regensburg until his death in 1475. Konrad also started the choir of the Nuremberg church of St. Lorenz in 1445.

== Craft Secrets ==
The Regensburg Ordinances from 1459 required that a mason be able to take the "elevation from a ground plan". The 1514 version of the Regensburg Ordinances also outlines other tasks a stonemason must complete prior to practicing. The techniques were taught by guilds who instructed their members, tested their skills, and essentially guaranteed their abilities. It is thought by some that these techniques were kept secret and that the publication of booklets such as Roriczer's revealed guild craft secrets. More recent scholarship suggest that secrecy was not actively enforced and these techniques appear to be craft secrets only because they were taught orally and through apprenticeships and until the end of the 15th century virtually no written record exists.

== Booklet ==
Büchlein von der Fialen Gerechtigkeit, which is translated as the Booklet Concerning Pinnacle Correctitude (1977) and The Rectitude of Pinnacles, was printed in Regensburg in 1486 and dedicated to Prince-Bishop Wilhelm von Reichenau or Eichstätt who ruled from 1464 to 1496 and whose coat of arms figures in the text.

The text describes the manner in which medieval masons used a "single dimensional unit" to produce a ground plan for a pinnacle that would be used in the construction of churches and cathedrals. At a time when there was no internationally agreed upon standard of measurement, medieval masons would define a square as a modular unit and then treat it in various ways, translating it or subdividing it, to give other relative measurements in a process called "constructive geometry" to create an effective local standard of measurement. Similar instructions are found in another period publication by Hans Schmuttermeyer of Nuremberg.

The method of ad quadratum or "of quadrature", described by Roriczer, takes a square and draws a diagonally-offset square inside and in a series of further steps, each illustrated, gives the technique for "elevating" a pinnacle. This general quadrature technique was used to produce other structures including the cross-sections of buildings. Another period technique based on the triangle (ad triangulum) was used for Bourges Cathedral.

== Works ==
- (1486) Büchlein von der Fialen Gerechtigkeit; English translation: Booklet Concerning Pinnacle Correctitude (1977)
- (1486–90) Geometria deutsch; English translation: Geometry [in] German (1977)
- (1486–90) Wimpergbüchlein; English translation: Booklet on Gablets (1977)

== See also ==
- Gothic architecture
