= Arlene Graston =

American artist and author (born 1946)

ARLENE GRASTON (born France, 1946) is an American artist and author.

Illustrated books include

- "Special Friends: Tales of Saints and Animals" 1981
- "Thumbelina" 1997, text by Hans Christian Andersen Translator-Erik Christian Haugaard
- "In Every Moon There Is Face" 2003, Text by Charles Mathes (ForeWord Magazine Book of the Year)
- "Do You Remember? Whispers From A Spiritual World" 2012

Original Broadway Show posters: Bubbling Brown Sugar 1976; Eubie 1978
