= Charles Mathes =

American mystery writer (born 1949)

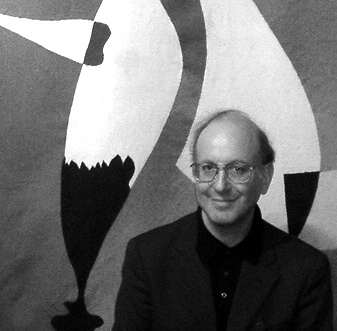
- Born: 1949 (age 76–77); Cleveland, Ohio, U.S.
- Occupation: Writer
- Writing career
- Genre: Mystery
- Subjects: Stand-alone books, each featuring a different heroine, and each having a different connection to art or antiques

Charles Mathes (born 1949) is an American mystery writer.

== Publications ==
Books

- Spirit of America, A State by State Celebration. 1990. Introduction by Bob Hope.
- Treasures of American Museums. 1991.
- The Girl With The Phony Name. 1992.
- The Girl Who Remembered Snow. 1996.
- The Girl At The End of the Line. 1999.
- The Girl in the Face of the Clock. 2001.
- In Every Moon There Is A Face. 2003. Illustrated by Arlene Graston.

Articles

- Mathes, Charles (Fall 2002). "My New York" (PDF). Mystery Scene Magazine. No. 76. pp. 49–50. Archived from the original (PDF) on 2007-07-31.
