= St. Lorenz, Nuremberg =

Medieval church in Nuremberg, Germany

St Lorenz
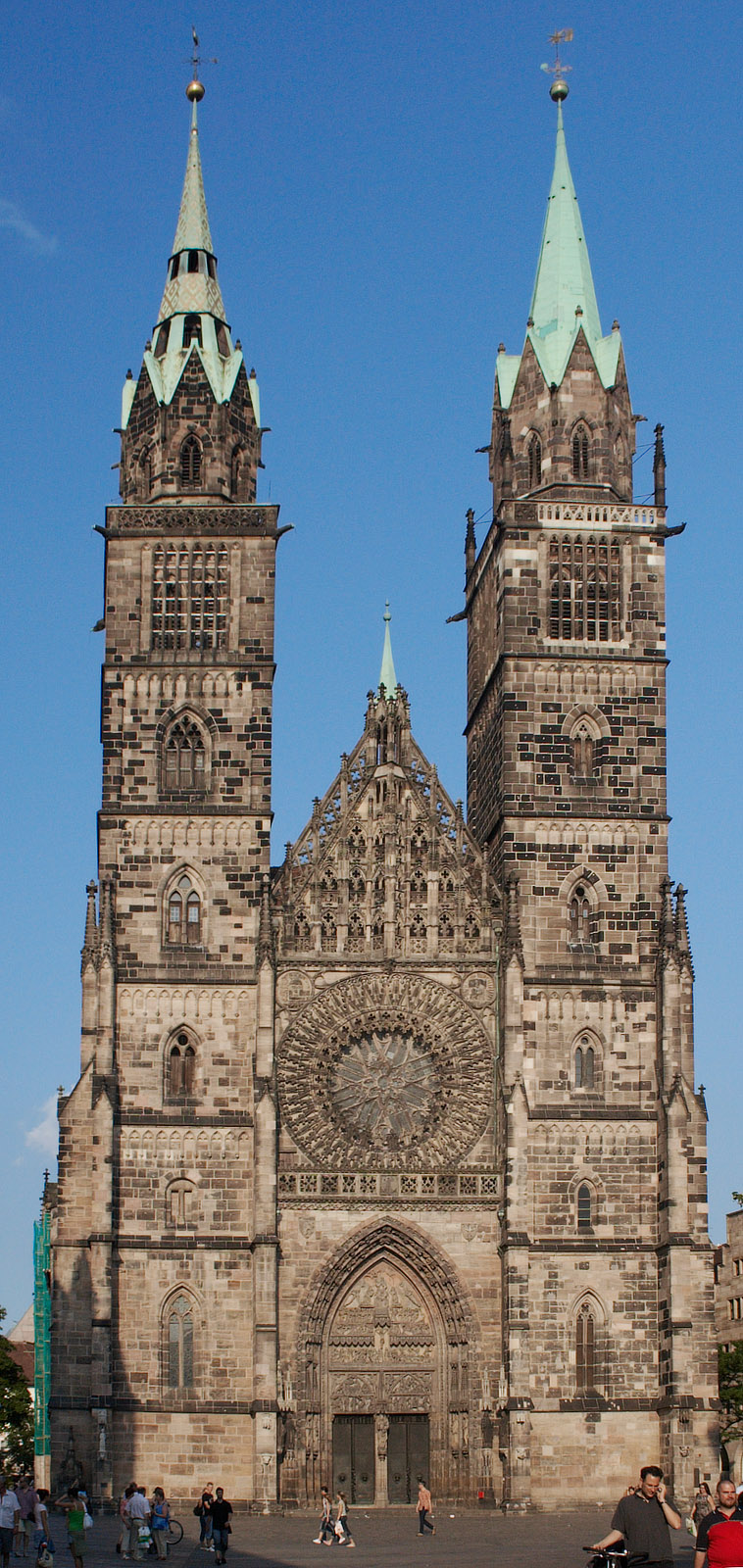
- West facade of the St Lorenz
- St Lorenz
- 49.451°N 11.078056°E
- Location: Nuremberg, Germany
- Denomination: Lutheran
- Previous denomination: Roman Catholic

History
- Status: Parish Church

Architecture
- Architectural type: Church
- Style: Gothic
- Groundbreaking: 1250
- Completed: 1477

Specifications
- Length: 91.2 m (299 ft)
- Width: 30.0 m (98.4 ft)
- Height: 81 m (266 ft)

St. Lorenz (St. Lawrence) is a medieval church of the former free imperial city of Nuremberg in southern Germany. It is dedicated to Saint Lawrence. The church was badly damaged during the Second World War and later restored. It is one of the most prominent churches of the Evangelical Lutheran Church in Bavaria.

== Architecture ==
The nave of the church was completed by around 1400. In 1439, work began on the choir in the form of a hall church in the late German Sondergotik style of Gothic architecture. The choir was largely completed by 1477 by Konrad Roriczer, although Jakob Grimm completed the intricate vaults.

In the choir one can find the carving of the Angelic Salutation by Veit Stoss, and the monumental tabernacle by Adam Kraft. The latter includes a prominent figure of the sculptor himself.

The building and furnishing of the church was cared for by the city council and by wealthy citizens. This is probably the reason why the art treasures of St. Lawrence were spared during the iconoclasm during the Reformation period. Despite St. Lawrence being one of the first churches in Germany to be Lutheran (1525), the wealthy citizens of Nuremberg wanted to preserve the memory of their ancestors and refused the removal of the donated works of art.

The west facade is richly articulated, reflecting the wealth of the Nuremberg citizens. The facade is dominated by the two towers, mirroring St. Sebald and indirectly Bamberg Cathedral with a sharp towering West portal doorway, and an indented rose window 9 metres in diameter.

== Organs ==
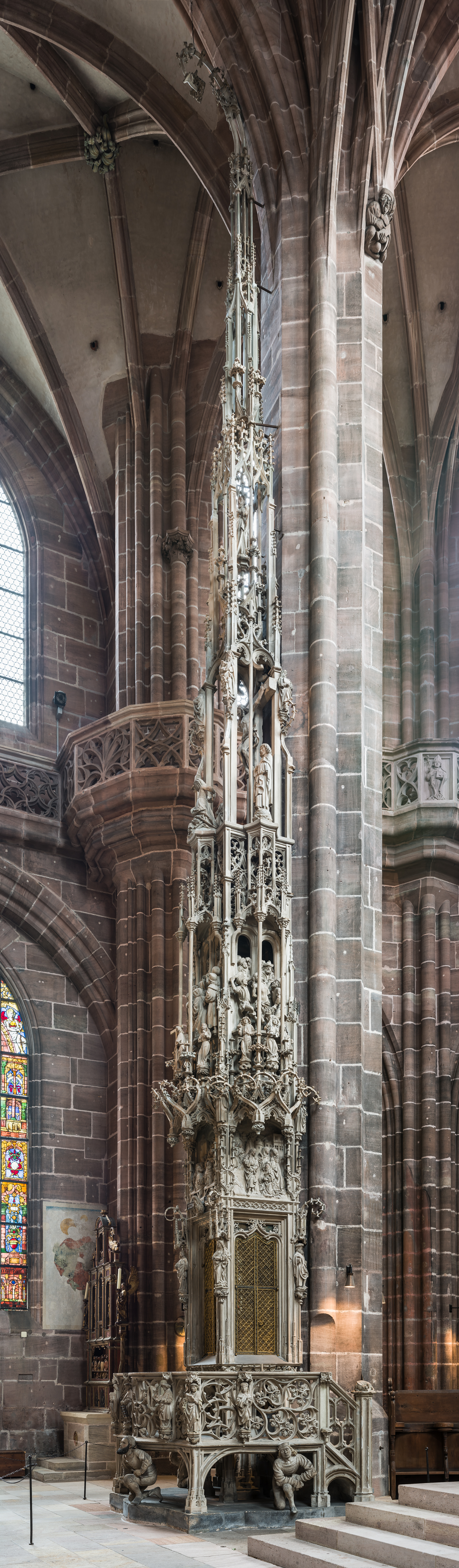
The hall choir including the sacrament house by Adam Kraft

The church has three organs.

- Main organ. Steinmeyer, Oettingen, 1937 rebuilt by Klais Orgelbau, Bonn, 2003. 5 manuals
- Stephans Organ. Steinmeyer op. 34 from 1862 formerly in the Evangelical Lutherin Church, Hersbruck, Restored in 2002 by Klais Orgelbau, Bonn. 2 manual
- Laurentius Organ. Klais Orgelbau, Bonn 2005. 3 manual.

=== Organists of St. Lorenz ===
The church has employed organists for over 500 years, many of them prominent musicians within Bavaria. Amongst the famous names are the following:

- Nicholas Pair (Bayer) ca. 1448
- Hans Seber 1510 - 1517
- Hans Feller 1517 - 1525
- Interregnum from 1525
- Georg Nötteleins ???? - 1565
- Paulus Lautensack 1565 - 1571
- Wilhelm Ende 1571 - 1581
- Kasper Hassler 1587 - 1616
- Johann Staaten 1611 - 1618
- Valentin Dretzel 1618 - 1634
- Sigmund Theophil Staden 1634 - 1655
- Albrect Martin Lunßdörffer 1688 - 1694
- Johann Löhner 1694 - 1705
- Wolfgang Förtsch 1705 - 1743
- Cornelius Heinrich Dretzel 1743 - 1764
- Johann Siebenkees 1764 - 1772
- Johann Gottlieb Frör 1814 - 1823
- Georg Friedrich Herrscher 1843 - 1870
- Carl Christian Mattäus 1871 - 1914
- Carl Böhm 1913 - 1917
- Walther Körner 1918 - 1962

== Gallery ==
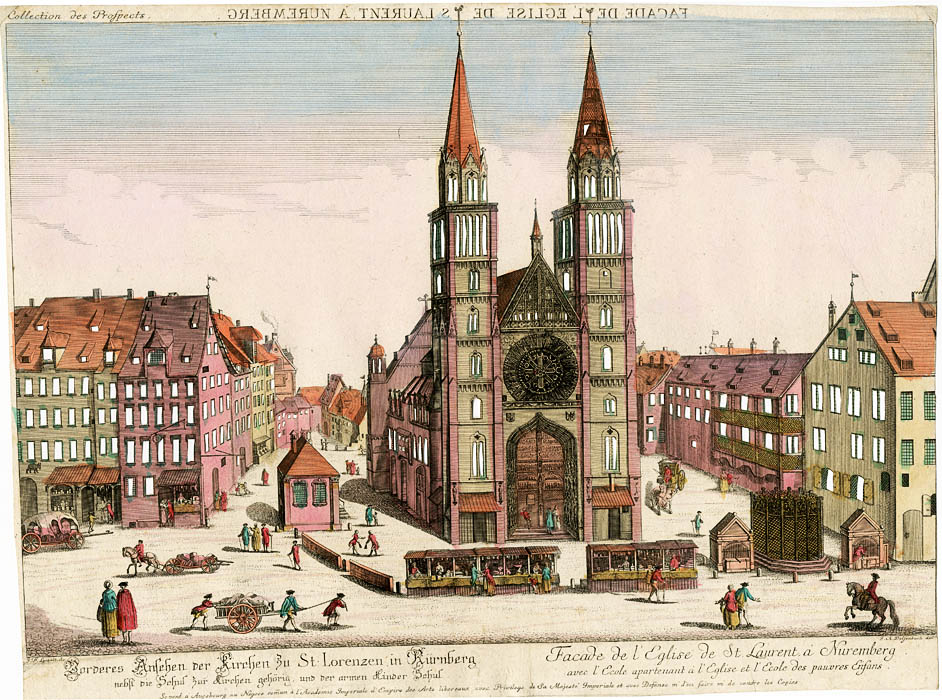
Reproduction (from 1770) of a print (from 1730) by Johann Adam Delsenbach

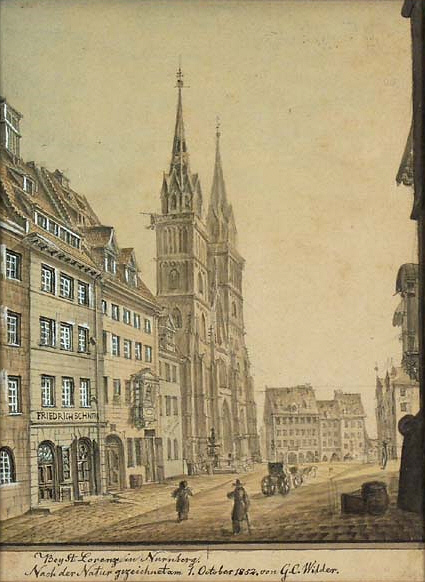
View (from 1852) by Georg Christoph Wilder

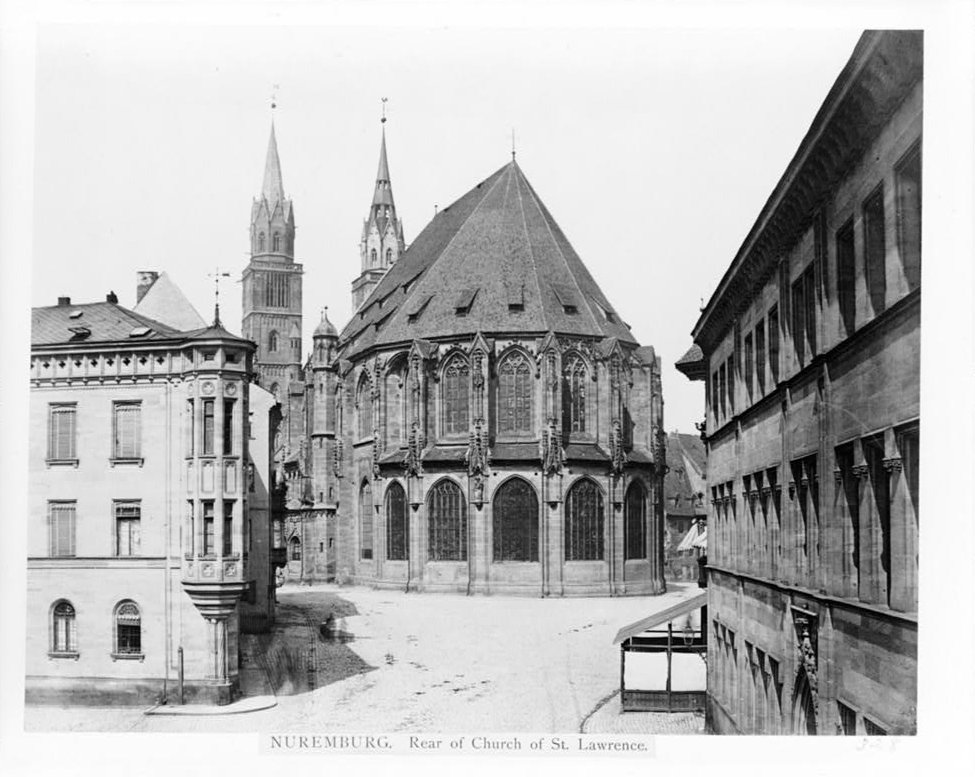
Photographs from 1860 and 1890

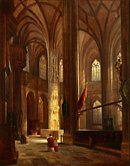
Interior view, Franz Stegmann, 1871

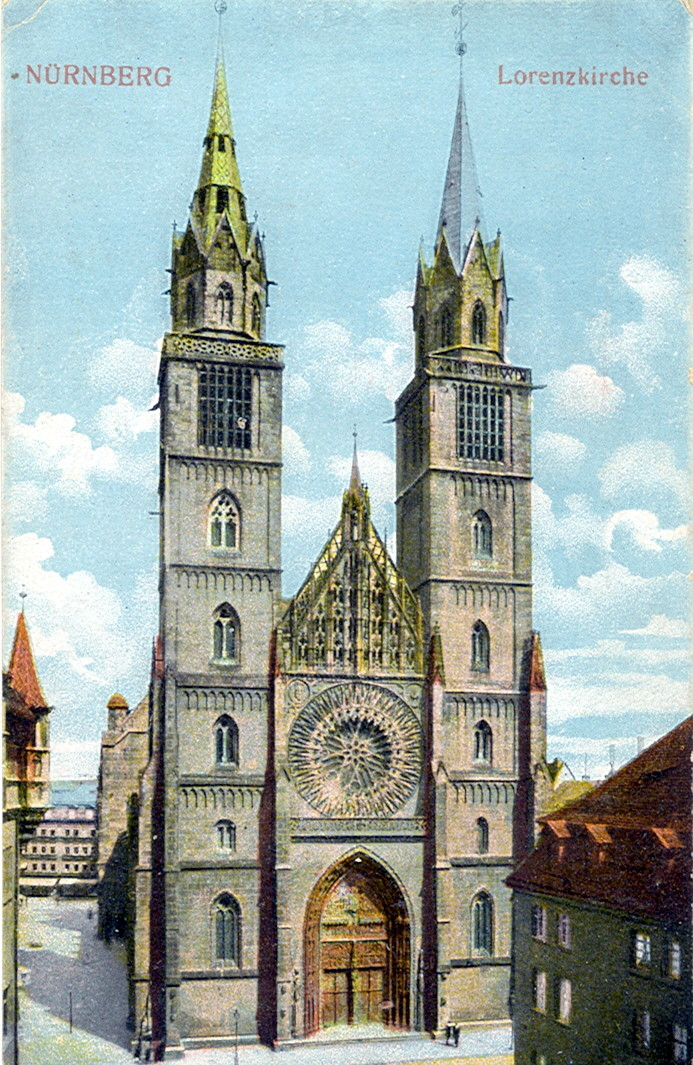
Postcard, ca. 1914

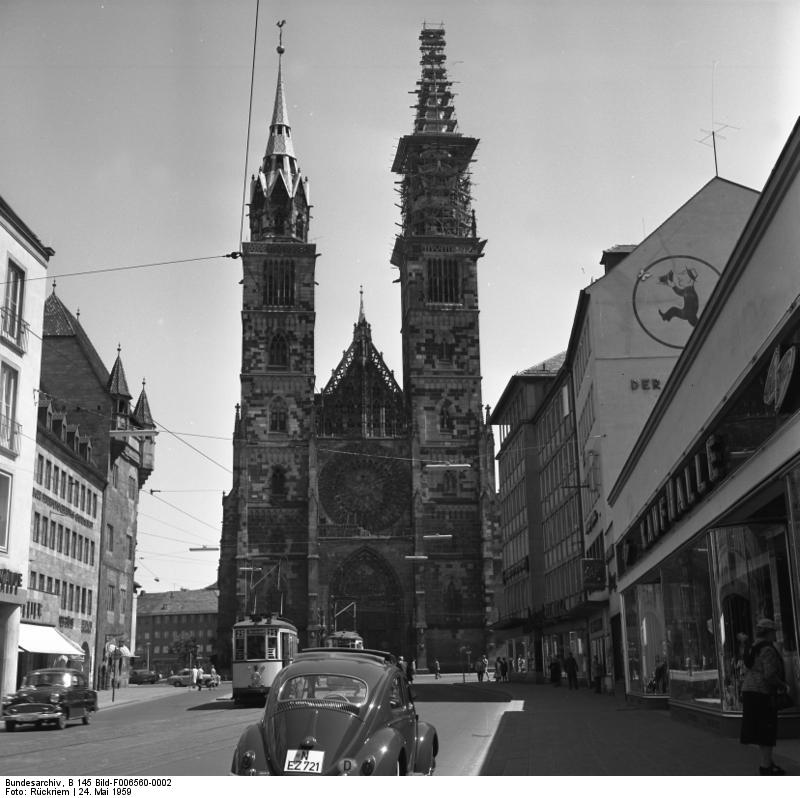
Photograph from 1959

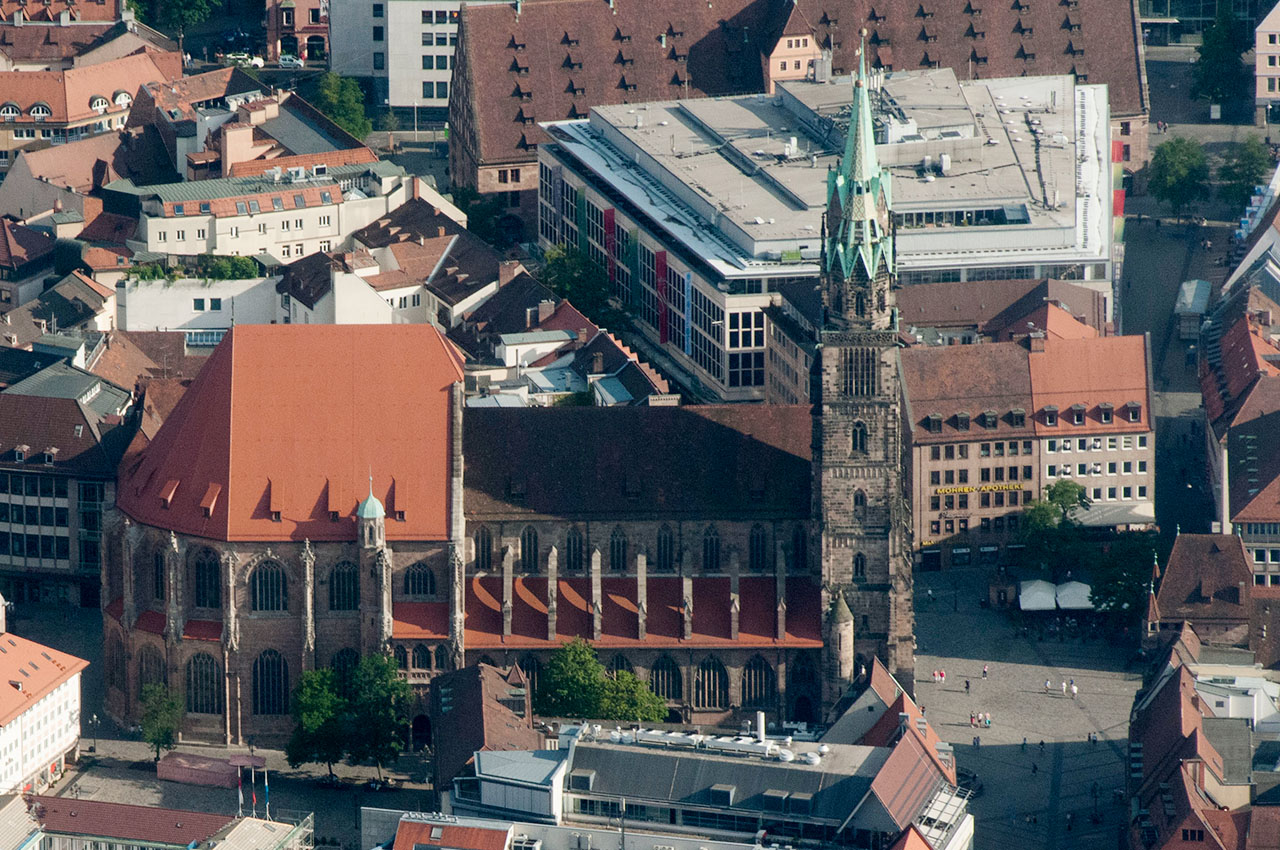
Aerial from North
- Angelic Salutation (Stoss)

== Sources ==
- Frankl, Paul (1960). The Gothic: Literary Sources and Interpretations through Eight Centuries. Princeton, New Jersey: Princeton University Press. p. 916. LCCN 57005471.
