= Harry Mathes =

American painter

Harry Aaron Mathes (1882–1969) was an American painter in the New York art scene from the early 20th century until his death in 1969.

== Biography ==
He was a graduate of the Chicago Art Institute. He had additional training in Paris, London, Munich and Italy between the wars (and with Hans Hofmann).

He settled in New York City living most of his life in Greenwich Village and he was a frequent exhibitor at the Lynn Kottler and Pietrantonio galleries and at juried shows. His stylistic repertoire encompassed Post-Impressionism, Cubism and abstract expressionism. Mathes had a lifetime membership in the New York Art Students' League, where he studied over several decades. Pre-1950s colleagues include Sigmund Menkes, Yasuo Kuniyoshi, Nahum Tschacbasov, and others. Midwestern artist Joe Jones credits Mathes for "training" him during a brief residence in St. Louis as one of the "Blue Lantern" waterfront group in the early 1920s.

Mathes was reviewed in the New York Times and the Herald Tribune, and is listed in Who Was Who in American Art. The recipient of numerous awards and prizes, he was photographed by Paul Juley in the 1950s and 1960s and exhibited at the National Museum of American Art as part of the Peter Juley and Son Collection documenting American artists, which currently resides in the archive of the Museum of American Art, the Smithsonian Institution.
