= Timeline of Nuremberg =

The following is a timeline of the history of the city of Nuremberg, Germany.

== Prior to 15th century ==
- 1030 – Nuremberg Castle built (approximate date).
- 1060 – Residence of the burgrave established.
- 1127 - Emperor Lothair assigns Nuremberg to Henry the Proud.
- 1140 – Monastery of St. Egidius founded.
- 1219 – Nuremberg becomes a Free Imperial City.
- 1298 – St. Lawrence church built.
- 1349 – Craftsmen's uprising.
- 1361 – Frauenkirche (church) built.
- 1377 – Luginsland Tower construction begins in Nuremberg Castle.
- 1380 – Nuremberg Charterhouse (monastery) founded.
- 1382 – Playing cards in use (approximate date).
- 1390 - Paper mill established by Stromer near city.
- 1397 - Population: 5,626.

== 15th–16th centuries ==
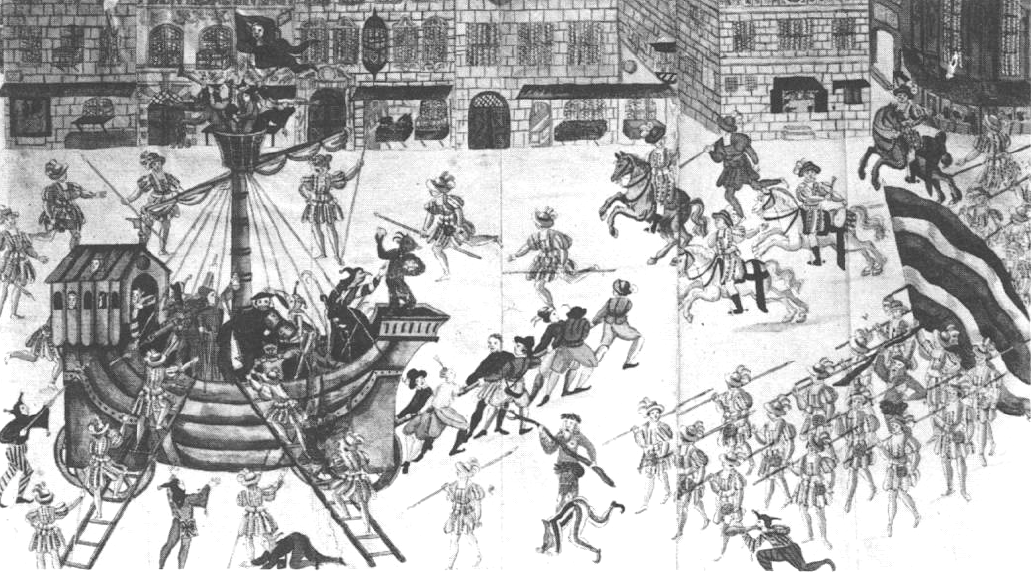
Parade, Nuremberg, 1539

- 1424 – Imperial Regalia of the Holy Roman Empire relocated to Nuremberg.
- 1427 – Ownership of Castle transferred to city.
- 1445 – Stadtbibliothek (city library) established.
- 1470 – Anton Koberger printer in business.
- 1484 - Reformacion der Stat Nuremberg (legal code) with Jewry Oath published
- 1485 - Kuchenmeysterey cookbook published.
- 1486 – Karlsbrücke (Nürnberg) (bridge) built.
- 1488 - Sigmund Meisterlin writes Nürnberger Chronik, a history of the city.
- 1492 – Martin Behaim creates Erdapfel (geographical globe).
- 1493 – Schedel's Liber Chronicarum published.
- 1495 – Artist Albrecht Dürer sets up workshop.
- 1505
  - City territory expanded per Landshut War of Succession.
  - Clockmaker Peter Henlein active (see Watch 1505)
- 1519
  - St. Sebaldus Church built.
  - Bratwurstglocklein tavern in business (approximate date).
- 1525 – Protestant Reformation.
- 1526 – Lutheran Melanchthon's Gymnasium opens.
- 1532 – City hosts religious Peace of Nuremberg agreement.
- 1541 - February: Charles V, Holy Roman Emperor visits city.
- 1543 – De revolutionibus orbium coelestium by Nicolaus Copernicus published.
- 1550 - St. Martha church in use as a theatre space by meistersinger Sachs.
- 1561 – April: Celestial phenomenon over Nuremberg.
- 1573 - Wenzel Jamnitzer a distinguished goldsmith represented the Goldsmiths on the Nuremberg city council.
- 1583 - Herrenschiesshaus built.
- 1598 – Fleisch Bridge built over Pegnitz.

== 17th–18th centuries ==
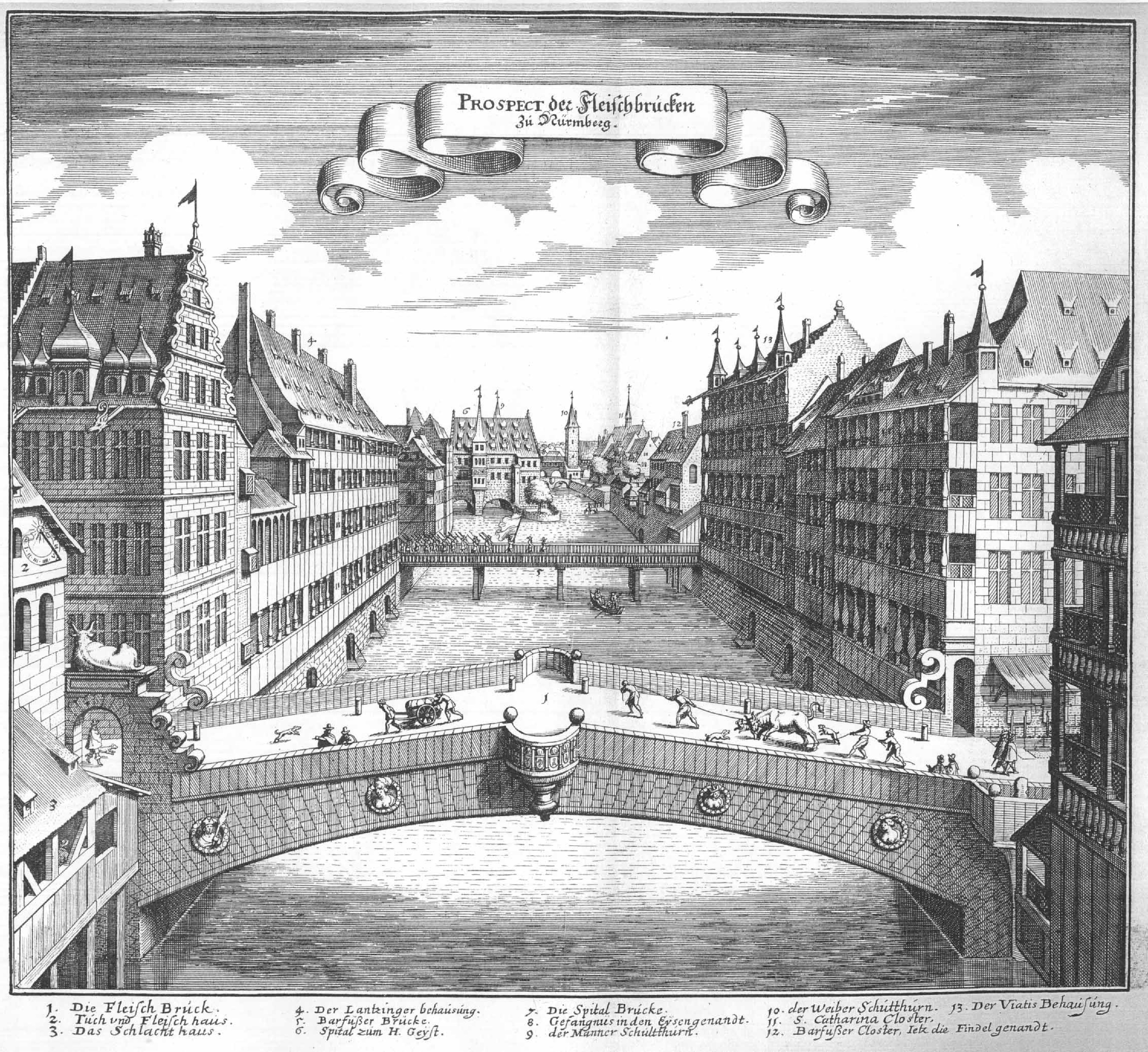
Fleisch Bridge over Pegnitz River, Nuremberg, 17th century (from Topographia Germaniae)

- 1619 – Nürnberger Rathaus (town hall) rebuilt.
- 1632 – Siege of Nuremberg.
- 1662 – Academy of Fine Arts established.
- 1668 – Simplicissimus (novel) published.
- 1695 – Pachelbel becomes organist of St. Sebaldus Church.
- 1718 – St. Egidien Church rebuilt.
- 1728 – Karlsbrücke (Nürnberg) (bridge) built.
- 1750 - Population: 30,000.
- 1792 – Kunstverein Nürnberg (art association) founded.

== 19th century ==
- 1806
  - 23 September: Polish 2nd Northern Legion formed in Nuremberg.
  - City becomes part of the Kingdom of Bavaria, per Treaty of Confederation of the Rhine.
- 1810
  - Catholic parish established.
  - Population: 28,544.
- 1817 – City becomes part of the Bavarian Rezatkreis district.
- 1818 - Population: 27,000.
- 1825 – Gostenhof and Johannisfriedhof become part of city.
- 1833 – New City Theatre built on Lorenzer Platz.
- 1835 – Bavarian Ludwigsbahn railway (Fürth-Nuremberg) begins operating.
- 1841 – Eisengießerei Klett & Comp. engineering firm in business.
- 1844 – Nürnberg Hauptbahnhof opens.
- 1852
  - German Museum established.
  - Population: 53,638.
- 1859 – Nuremberg–Schwandorf railway begins operating.
- 1861 - Population: 62,797.
- 1868 – Bayerisches Gewerbemuseum (museum) founded.
- 1871 – Albrecht Dürer's House museum established.
- 1875 - Population: 91,018.
- 1878 – Verein fur Geschichte der Stadt (city history society) active.
- 1882 – Numismatic Society founded.
- 1883 – Nuremberg–Cheb railway in operation.
- 1885 – Schuckert & Co. engineering firm in business.
- 1889 – Verein von Freunden der Photographie (photo group) founded.

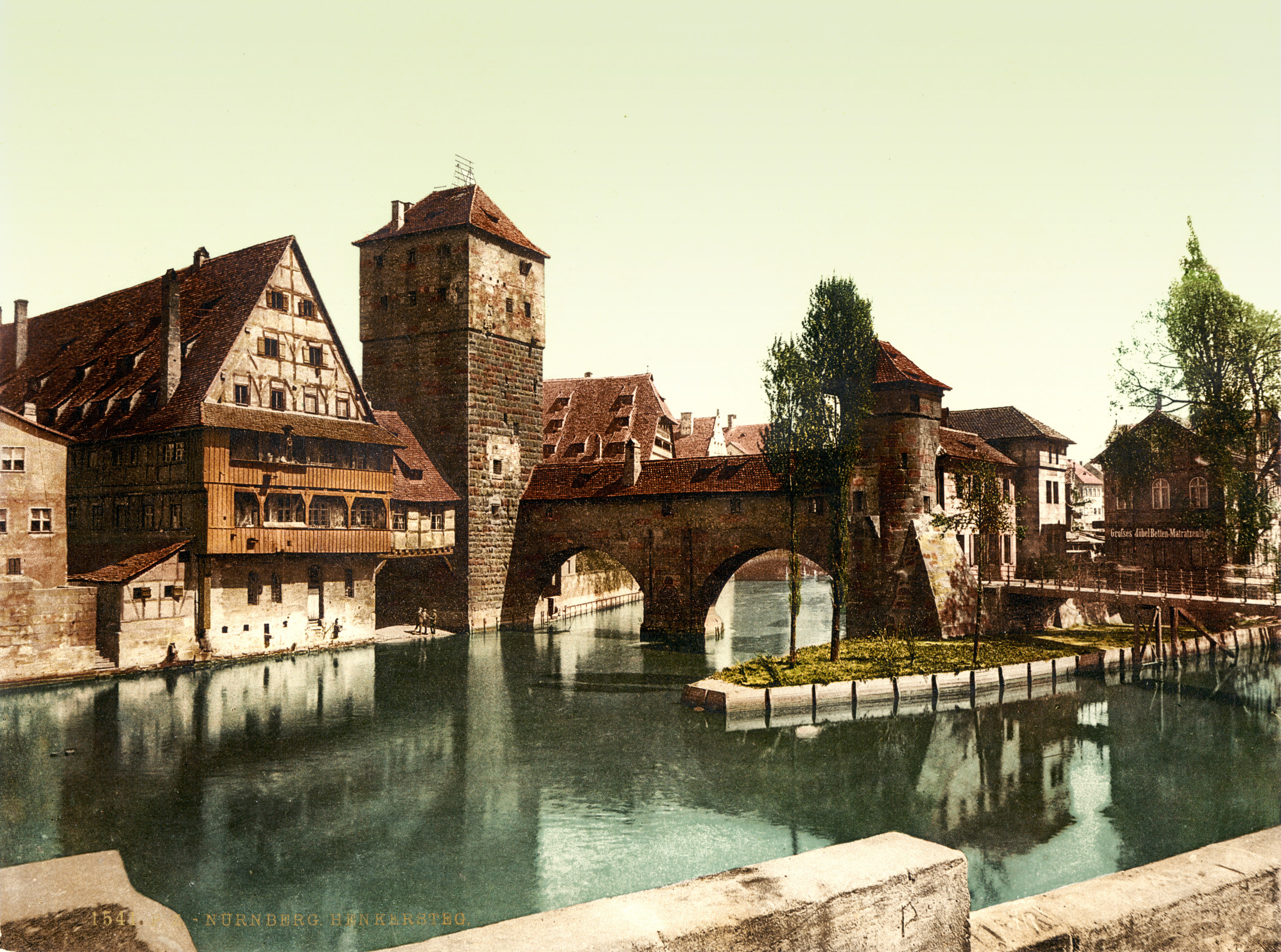
Nuremberg in the 1890s

- 1899
  - Nuremberg Photography Society founded.
  - Railway museum opens.
- 1900
  - Emil Meßthaler's Intimes Theater opens.
  - Population: 261,081.

== 20th century ==
- 1905
  - New Staatstheater Nürnberg inaugurated.
  - Population: 294,344.
- 1912 – Nuremberg Zoo opens.
- 1916 – Palace of Justice built.
- 1927 – August: 3rd Nazi Party Congress held.
- 1928 – Frankenstadion (stadium) opens.
- 1929 – August: 4th Nazi Party Congress held.
- 1930 - Population: 416,700.
- 1933 – 30 August-3 September: 5th Nazi Party Congress held; Riefenstahl's Der Sieg des Glaubens filmed.

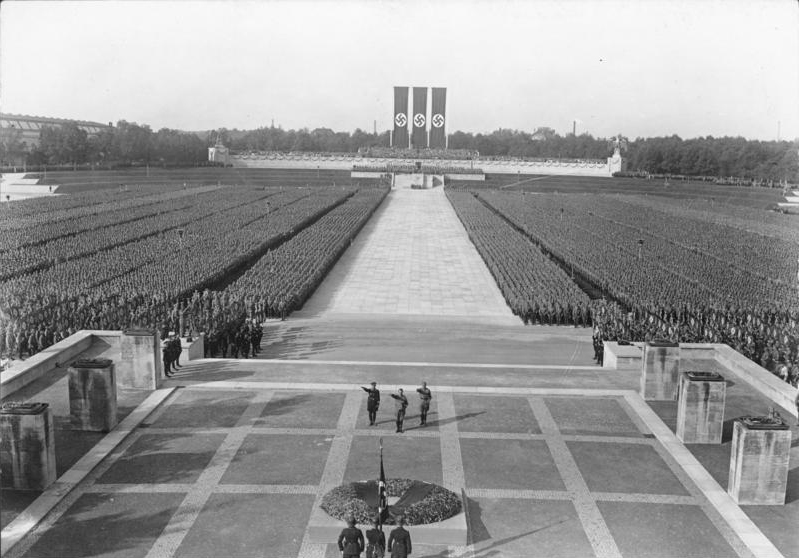
Nazi Party Congress in 1934

- 1934
  - July: 4th Deutsche Kampfspiele (athletic event) held in Frankenstadion.
  - September: 6th Nazi Party Congress held; Riefenstahl's Triumph of the Will filmed.
- 1937 – Deutsches Stadion construction begins (never completed).
- 1938 – Expulsion of Polish Jews.
- 1939 – Internment camp for civilian prisoners established (future Stalag XIII-D POW camp).
- 1940 – Oflag XIII-A prisoner-of-war camp for French, British, Belgian, Polish and Serbian officers established in Langwasser.
- 1941
  - March: Oflag XIII-B POW camp for Serbian officers established in Langwasser.
  - May: Forced labour camp established at the SS barracks.
- 1942
  - 3 May: Oflag XIII-A POW camp dissolved.
  - October: Russenwiese forced labour camp established.
- 1943
  - April: Oflag XIII-B POW camp relocated to Hammelburg.
  - 15 July: Forced labour camp at the SS barracks converted into a subcamp of the Flossenbürg concentration camp.
  - August: Russenwiese forced labour camp dissolved.
- 1944
  - April: Oflag 73 POW camp relocated from Beniaminów to Langwasser.
  - October: Subcamp of Flossenbürg for women established at the Siemens-Schuckertwerke factory.
  - November: Oflag 73 POW camp converted into a subcamp of the Stalag XIII-D camp.
- 1945
  - March: Siemens-Schuckertwerke subcamp of Flossenbürg dissolved. Prisoners sent to subcamps in Holýšov and Mehltheuer.
  - April: SS barracks subcamp of Flossenbürg dissolved. Prisoners sent to the Dachau concentration camp.
  - 16–20 April: Battle of Nuremberg.
  - October: Nürnberger Nachrichten newspaper begins publication.
  - 20 November: International Military Tribunal against Nazi leaders begins.
- 1946
  - 9 December: Nuremberg Military Tribunals against Nazi leaders begin.
  - Franconia State Orchestra formed.
- 1948 — A "strong tornado" destroys dozens of homes and kills 11 people in the city.
- 1950
  - German Toy Fair begins.
  - Population: 362,459.
- 1957 – Langwasser development begins.
- 1959 – St. Egidien Church rebuilt.
- 1967 – Kunsthalle Nürnberg (art centre) founded.
- 1968 – City mapped into 10 Statistischen Stadtteilen (statistical districts).
- 1971 – Nuremberg Toy Museum founded.
- 1972 – Katzwang becomes part of city.
- 1987 – Nuremberg S-Bahn S1 metro railway begins operating.
- 1992 – Nuremberg S-Bahn S2 and S3 metro railway begins operating.
- 2000 – Neues Museum Nürnberg opens.

== 21st century ==
- 2001 – City co-hosts the 2001 IIHF World Championship.
- 2002 – Ulrich Maly becomes mayor.
- 2010 – Nuremberg S-Bahn S4 metro railway begins operating.
- 2012 – Population: 495,121.

== See also ==
- History of Nuremberg
- List of mayors of Nuremberg
- Free Imperial City of Nuremberg, 1219-1806
- List of districts of Nuremberg
- Art and architecture of Nuremberg (in German)
- Timelines of other cities in the state of Bavaria: Augsburg, Munich, Würzburg

== Bibliography ==
=== in English ===
Published in the 18th-19th century

- Thomas Nugent (1749), "Nurenberg", The Grand Tour, vol. 2: Germany and Holland, London: S. Birt, hdl:2027/mdp.39015030762572
- Monsieur de Blainville (1757), "Nuremburg", Travels through Holland, Germany, Switzerland, but especially Italy, Translated by Turnbull, London: John Noon
- Richard Brookes (1786), "Nuremberg", The General Gazetteer (6th ed.), London: J.F.C. Rivington
- David Brewster, ed. (1832). "Nuremberg". Edinburgh Encyclopædia. Philadelphia: Joseph and Edward Parker. hdl:2027/uc2.ark:/13960/t2x352b0z.
- "Nuremberg", Leigh's New Descriptive Road Book of Germany, London: Leigh and Son, 1837
- Henry John Whitling (1850), Pictures of Nuremberg, London: R. Bentley, OL 23403092M
- Charles Tylor (1852). "(Nuremberg)". A historical tour in Franconia, in the summer of 1852. Brighton, England: Robert Folthorp.
- Theodore Alois Buckley (1862), "Nuremberg", Great Cities of the Middle Ages (2nd ed.), London: Routledge, Warne, & Routledge
- George Henry Townsend (1867), "Nuremberg", A Manual of Dates (2nd ed.), London: Frederick Warne & Co.
- "Nuremberg", Southern Germany and Austria (2nd ed.), Coblenz: Karl Baedeker, 1871, OCLC 4090237
- W. Pembroke Fetridge (1881), "Nuremberg", Harper's Hand-book for Travellers in Europe and the East, New York: Harper & Brothers
- "Nuremberg", Appletons' European Guide Book, New York: D. Appleton & Co., 1888
- Norddeutscher Lloyd (1896), "Nuremberg", Guide through Germany, Austria-Hungary, Italy, Switzerland, France, Belgium, Holland and England, Berlin: J. Reichmann & Cantor, OCLC 8395555
- "Nuremberg", Bradshaw's Illustrated Hand-book to Germany and Austria, London: W.J. Adams & Sons, 1898
- Cecil Headlam (1900), The Story of Nuremberg, London: J.M. Dent & Co., OCLC 1135511, OL 6903352M
- Schrag's new handy guide to Nuremberg (4th ed.). Nuremberg: J.L. Schrag. 1900.

Published in the 20th century

- "Nuremberg". Handbook for Travellers in South Germany and Austria (15th ed.). London: J. Murray. 1903. (1863 ed.)
- Hermann Uhde-Bernays (1904), Nuremberg, London: A. Siegle, OL 7160240M
- Mrs. Arthur G. Bell (1905), Nuremberg, London: Adam and Charles Black, OL 17933549M
- Paul Johannes Rée (1905), Nuremberg and Its Art to the End of the 18th Century, London: Grevel
- "Nuremberg" . Encyclopædia Britannica. Vol. 19 (11th ed.). 1910. pp. 913–914.
- Nuremberg and Rothenburg on the Tauber. Grieben's Guide Books. Berlin. 1911.
- Nathaniel Newnham Davis (1911), "Nuremberg", The Gourmet's Guide to Europe (3rd ed.), London: Grant Richards
- Francis Whiting Halsey, ed. (1914). "Nuremberg". Germany, Austria-Hungary, and Switzerland. Seeing Europe with Famous Authors. Vol. 5. Funk & Wagnalls Company – via HathiTrust.
- Gerald Strauss (1976), Nuremberg in the sixteenth century, Bloomington: Indiana University Press, ISBN 0253341493
- Laura A. Smoller (1986). "Playing Cards and Popular Culture in Sixteenth-Century Nuremberg". Sixteenth Century Journal. 17 (2): 183–214. doi:10.2307/2540255. JSTOR 2540255.
- Stewart Spencer (1992). "Wagner's Nuremberg". Cambridge Opera Journal. 4 (1): 21–41. doi:10.1017/S0954586700003591. JSTOR 823774. S2CID 193209134.

Published in the 21st century

- John M. Jeep, ed. (2001). "Nuremberg". Medieval Germany: an Encyclopedia. Garland Publishing. ISBN 0-8240-7644-3.
- Brockmann, Stephen (2006). Nuremberg: The Imaginary Capital. Rochester: Camden House Publishing. ISBN 978-1-57113-345-8.

=== in German ===
- Matthäus Merian; Martin Zeiler (1648). "Nürnberg". Topographia Franconiae. Topographia Germaniae (in German). Frankfurt. pp. 65–78.
- Johann Christoph Jakob Wilder (1827). Nürnberg: Eine gedrängte Zusammenstelllung seiner Merkwürdigkeiten [Nuremberg: a Concise Compilation of its Places of Interest] (in German). Nürnberg.
- Carl Mainberger; Johannes Scharrer (1837). Eine Woche in Nürnberg: Kurzgefaßte Beschreibung der Stadt Nürnberg und ihrer Umgebungen [A week in Nuremberg: brief description of the city of Nuremberg and its surroundings] (2nd ed.). Nurnberg: Riegel und Wießner.
- Nürnberg. Die Chroniken der Deutschen Städte (in German). Vol. 1–3, 10–11. Leipzig: S. Hirzel Verlag. 1862–1874 – via HathiTrust.
- Friedrich Wilhelm Ghillany (1863). Nürnberg: historisch und topographisch [Nuremberg: historical and topographical] (in German). Munich: Georg Franz.
- Johannes Wanschka (1870). Adreß-Buch für die Stadt Nürnberg (in German). Nürnberg: Bieling.
- Nürnberg-Fürther Industrie-Almanach [Nuremberg-Furth Business Almanac] (in German). Nürnberg: Jacob Sichling. 1870.
- P. Krauss und E. Uetrecht, ed. (1913). "Nurnberg". Meyers Deutscher Städteatlas [Meyer's Atlas of German Cities] (in German). Leipzig: Bibliographisches Institut.
- Wolfgang Adam; Siegrid Westphal, eds. (2012). "Nurnberg". Handbuch kultureller Zentren der Frühen Neuzeit: Städte und Residenzen im alten deutschen Sprachraum (in German). De Gruyter. pp. 1569+. ISBN 978-3-11-029555-9.
