= Stromer von Reichenbach =

German Family

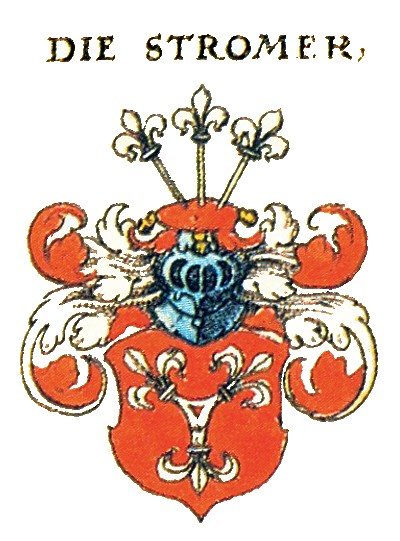
Das Wappen der Stromer

The Stromer von Reichenbach are one of the oldest patrician families of the Imperial City of Nuremberg, first mentioned in a document in 1254. The Stromers were represented in the Inner Council from the beginning of the tradition in 1318, with longer interruptions in the 16th and 17th centuries, until the end of the Imperial City period in 1806, and according to the Dance Statute they belonged to the twenty old councilable families.

Family seat since 1754 until today is the Grünsberg Castle, which originally came from the Paumgartnern and came to the Stromers through marriage via the Haller.

== History ==
The origin of the Stromer (in the Middle Ages also Strohmeyer, Stromeir, Stromair, Stromeyr or Stromayr) is in the environment of the staufer Reichsministerialenfamilie of the Ramung von Kammerstein-Reichenbach-Schwabach (so first Ulman Stromer in his family chronicle). The progenitor Conrat (or Cunradus) Stromeier, who appeared as a witness in legal transactions in Nuremberg around 1240 (certainly as late as 1254), called himself Stromeier von Schwabach. By their admission to the Inner Council, already since the beginning of records in 1318, the family belonged early to the ruling Nuremberg Patriciate. Mostly the family was represented twice in the Inner Council.

Relationships to the Waldstromer von Reichelsdorf and the Stromer von Auerbach. (appearing in Auerbach in der Oberpfalz in the 15th century) have not been satisfactorily clarified.

With the Gruber-Podmer-Stromerschen Handelsgesellschaft, the Stromers played a central role in the Nuremberg trade of the 14th and 15th centuries, one of the largest and most important economic enterprises of the time. They traded the typical assortment of goods of the late Middle Ages (spices, textiles, metals, metal goods). The trade network extended across Europe, from Barcelona to Riga and Azov, from Naples to Copenhagen and London. In addition to long-distance trade, there was iron ore mining in the Upper Palatinate, copper mining in Bohemia (Kuttenberg) and in Upper Hungarian Slovakia (Neusohl), financial transactions and factories for the production of paper and metal products. Through this, the Stromers also had influence on the production of cutting, stabbing and firearms. Affiliated were Hammer mill and Mining, for whose sustainable wood supply Peter Stromer undertook planned afforestation in the Lorenzer Reichswald as early as 1368. Co-shareholders or trading partners were the Groß, Mendel and Pfinzing. This circle expanded around 1400 to include the merchant families Pirckheimer, Imhoff, Aislinger and Gruber, who had come to Nuremberg from the Lauingen area.

In the 14th/15th century, a particularly prestigious line of the family called itself "zur goldenen Rose" (on the site of the later Welserhof) after its ancestral home. From the late 16th century, when many patrician families extended their family names to include place names, following the example of the nobility, the Stromers called themselves von Reichenbach after their traditional place of origin. In 1697 the addition became a title of nobility, when the Nuremberg patricians were allowed the title Edler.

During this period, close contacts of the family with Roman emperors (v. a. Karl IV) and high imperial princes (Ruprecht II of the Palatinate). Ulman I. Stromer (1329–1407) was closely associated with the Palatine Wittelsbach elector Ruprecht II, and his financial support contributed in 1400 to the overthrow of King Wenceslaus (1376–1400) and the election of Ruprecht II's son Ruprecht III as Roman-German king (1400–1410). King Ruprecht was a guest of Ulman Stromer on the occasion of stays at Nuremberg Imperial Castle and in 1401 his wife, Queen Elisabeth, née Countess of the Castle of Hohenzollern-Nuremberg, stood godmother to a granddaughter of Ulman.

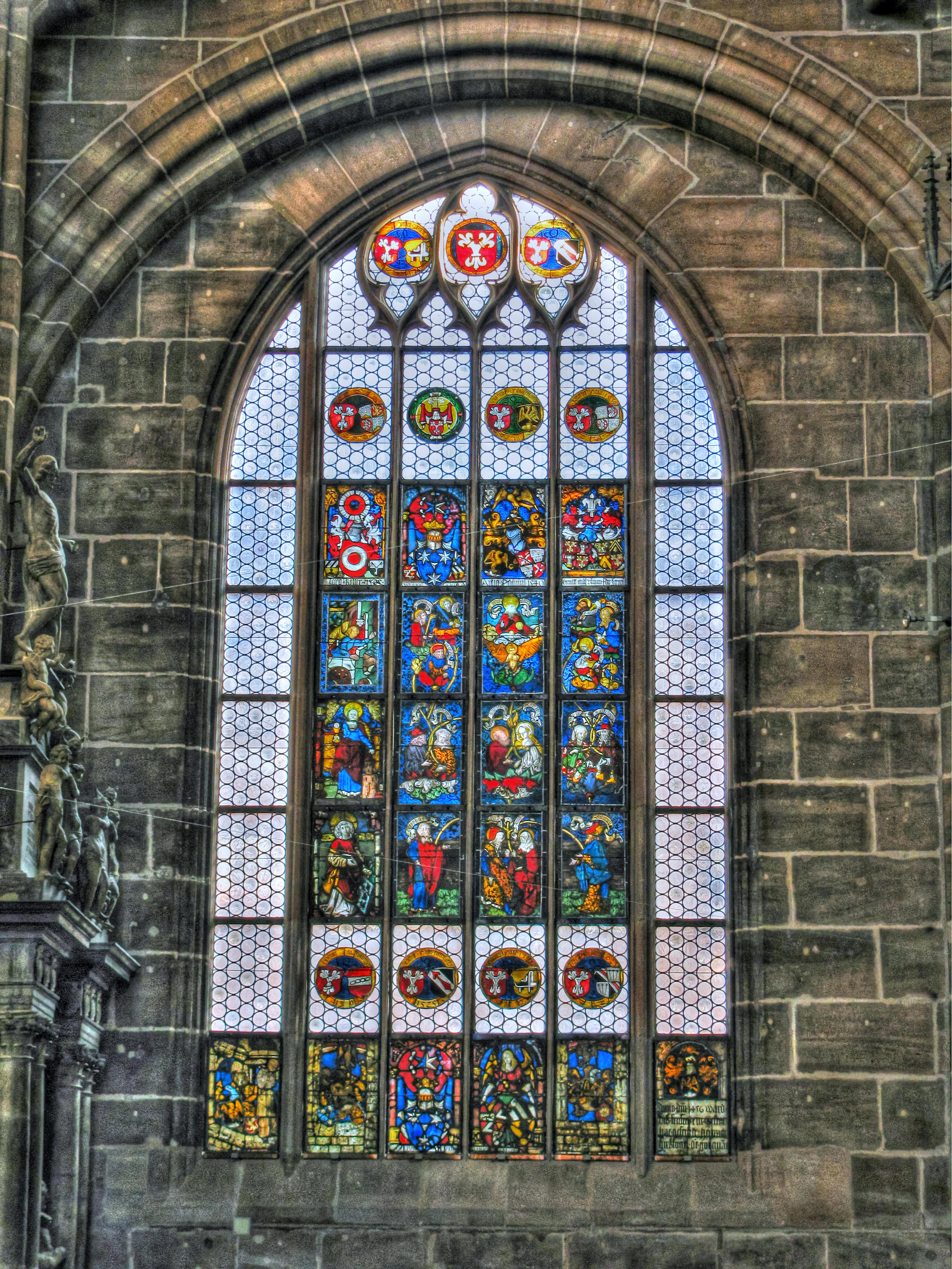
Stromer-Fenster in St. Lorenz

The plague, which claimed the lives of eight Stromers working in the family firm alone in 1406/07 (including Ulman I), almost led to the ruin of the company. Ulman's surviving son Georg (1375-1437) subsequently opened together with his father-in-law Hans Aislinger from Lauingen, who had become a Nuremberg citizen in 1370 and was also a named in the greater council of the imperial city between 1380 and 1407, as well as his grandson Hans Ortlieb († 1459) founded their own company, the Handelsgesellschaft Stromer-Ortlieb, which took over the business of the old Gruber-Podmer-Stromer company. The new company granted loans to King Sigismund. The latter was guided by Georg Stromer in the fall of 1414 through the Hadermühle, where he produced the first paper north of the Alps, because the king was looking for alternative sources of purchase for paper, which had already become indispensable in the news business of the time, for his economic war against Venice. In 1412, Hans Gruber († 1443) joined the company as a factor. Sigmund I Stromer zur goldenen Rose († 1435) played an important role in 1424 in the rescue of the Imperial Regalia for King Sigismund from Hungary, which was besieged by the Hussites. The king gave the crown treasure to the imperial city in trust, where it was henceforth kept in the Heilig-Geist-Spital for almost 400 years.

The Hussite Wars, Sigismund's economic war against Venice, losses in London and Copenhagen, and enormous embezzlements by Hans Ortlieb led to the bankruptcy of the second Stromergesellschaft around 1430. It was succeeded by the trading companies of Imhoff and Gruber, which had now become independent.

The Stromers could not recover from the resulting loss of importance for a long time, so that they were not represented at all in the ruling "Inner Council" for long periods in the 16th and 17th centuries. Wolf Jacob Stromer (1561–1614), a member of the Inner Council, then played an important role as city architect in the period before the Thirty Years' War, however; among other things, he had the fortifications expanded, bridges built, the imperial city Fortress Lichtenau reinforced, and designed the four-wing Renaissance building of the Altes Rathaus (built from 1616).

The Stromer window in the east choir of Sebaldskirche contains representations of coats of arms from various periods: In the second row it contains the older coat of arms representations from the 14th century, with Ulrich II Stromer (who acquired the house "Zur Goldenen Rose" in 1356) and his children and children-in-law. He died in the year of the consecration of the choir in 1379 and had this foundation executed as a legacy. The lowest row contains coat of arms representations from the early 16th century.

After the end of the imperial city period and the takeover of Nuremberg by Bavaria in 1808, the Stromers, along with the other patrician families, were enrolled as nobles in the Bavarian nobility in 1813. As one of the old council dynasties under the Dance Statute, the Stromers of Reichenbach were elevated to the Freiherrenstand in 1820. Otto Stromer von Reichenbach (1831–1891) was the last and only member of the patriciate to provide a First Mayor for 24 years (from 1867 to 1891) during the Gründerzeit.

Today the Stromer'sche Kulturgut-, Denkmal- und Naturstiftung is in charge of preservation and maintenance of the remaining Stromer (and v. a. also Paumgartner-) heritage at Grünsberg Castle, in whose foundation board several family members still sit.

== Coat of arms ==
In red a fallen silver triangle, at the tips studded with half silver lilies (Lilientriangel). On the helmet with red-silver blankets on a red cushion three silver Glevenstäbe (staffs with an upper half lily), alternatively a lily.

Stromer's coat of arms was taken over by the related Nützel von Sündersbühl, which led to a coat of arms dispute, which was decided by the council in 1380 that the Nützels were allowed to use the same coat of arms. It was not until 1548 that the shield of the Nützels was quartered to distinguish them from the Stromers, with a black eagle on silver. A similar triangular coat of arms, but with stars instead of lilies and on a blue shield, was used by the Geuder von Heroldsberg.

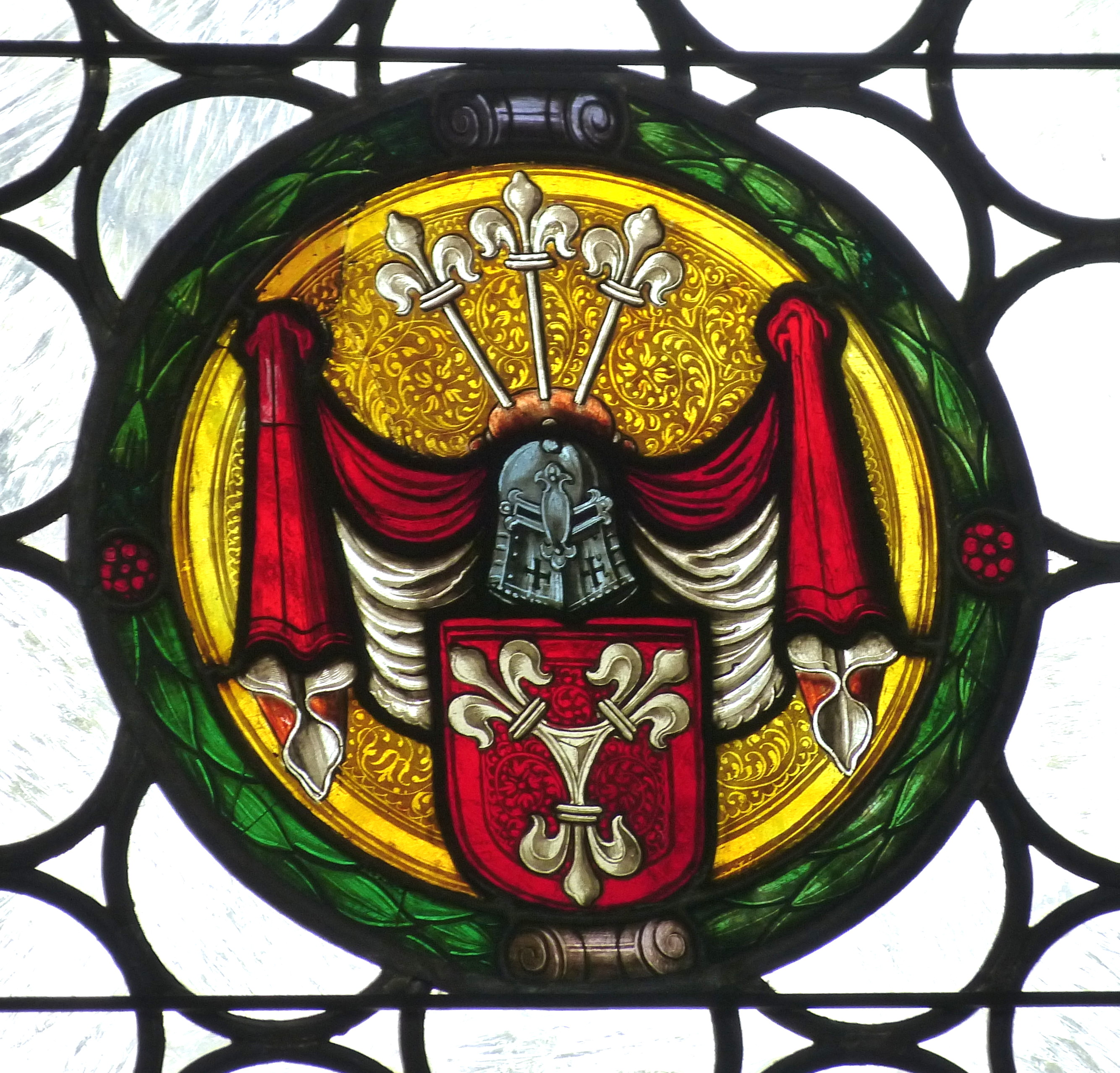
Armorial window in St. Lawrence

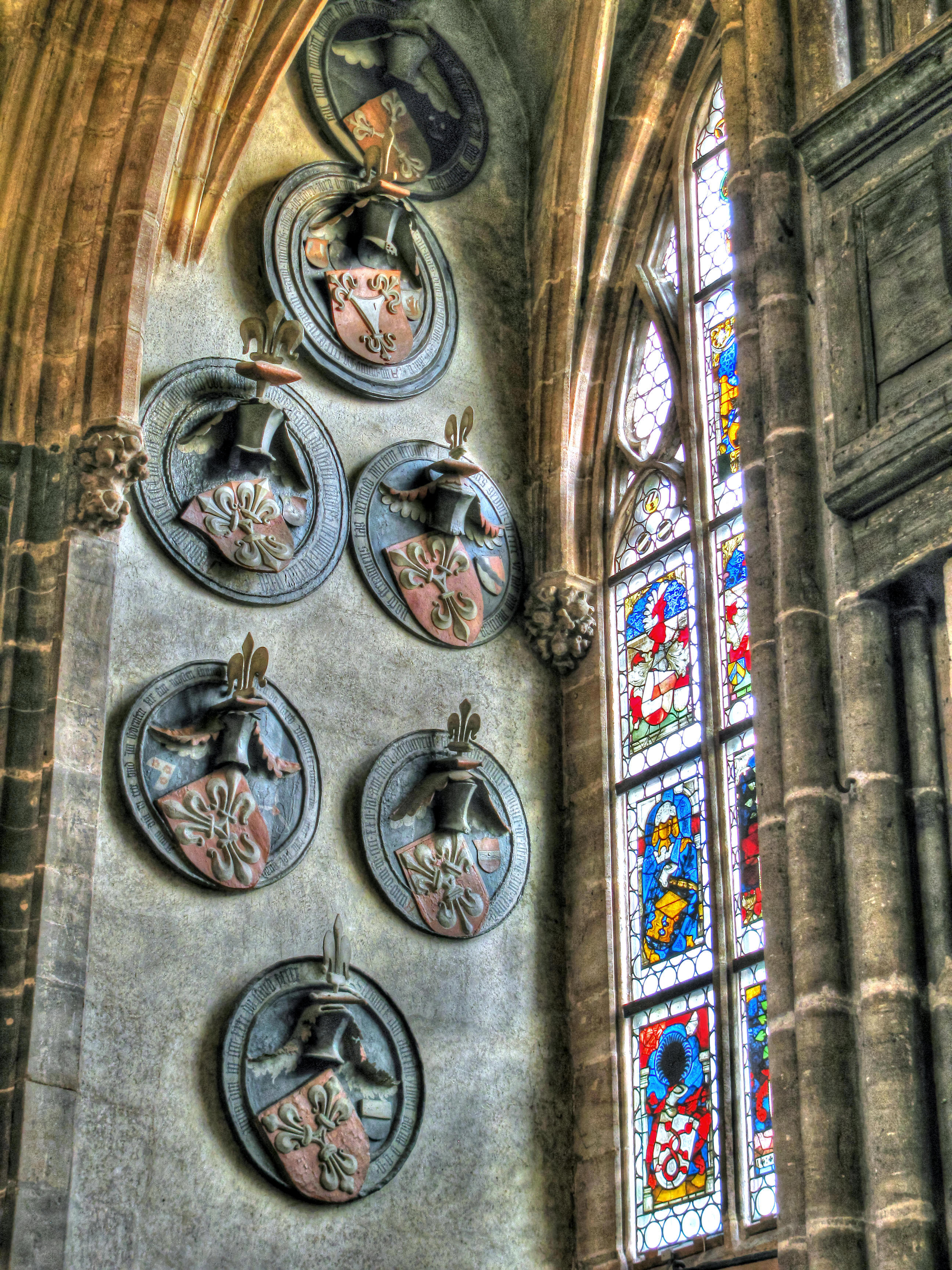
Shrouds in the Lorenzkirche

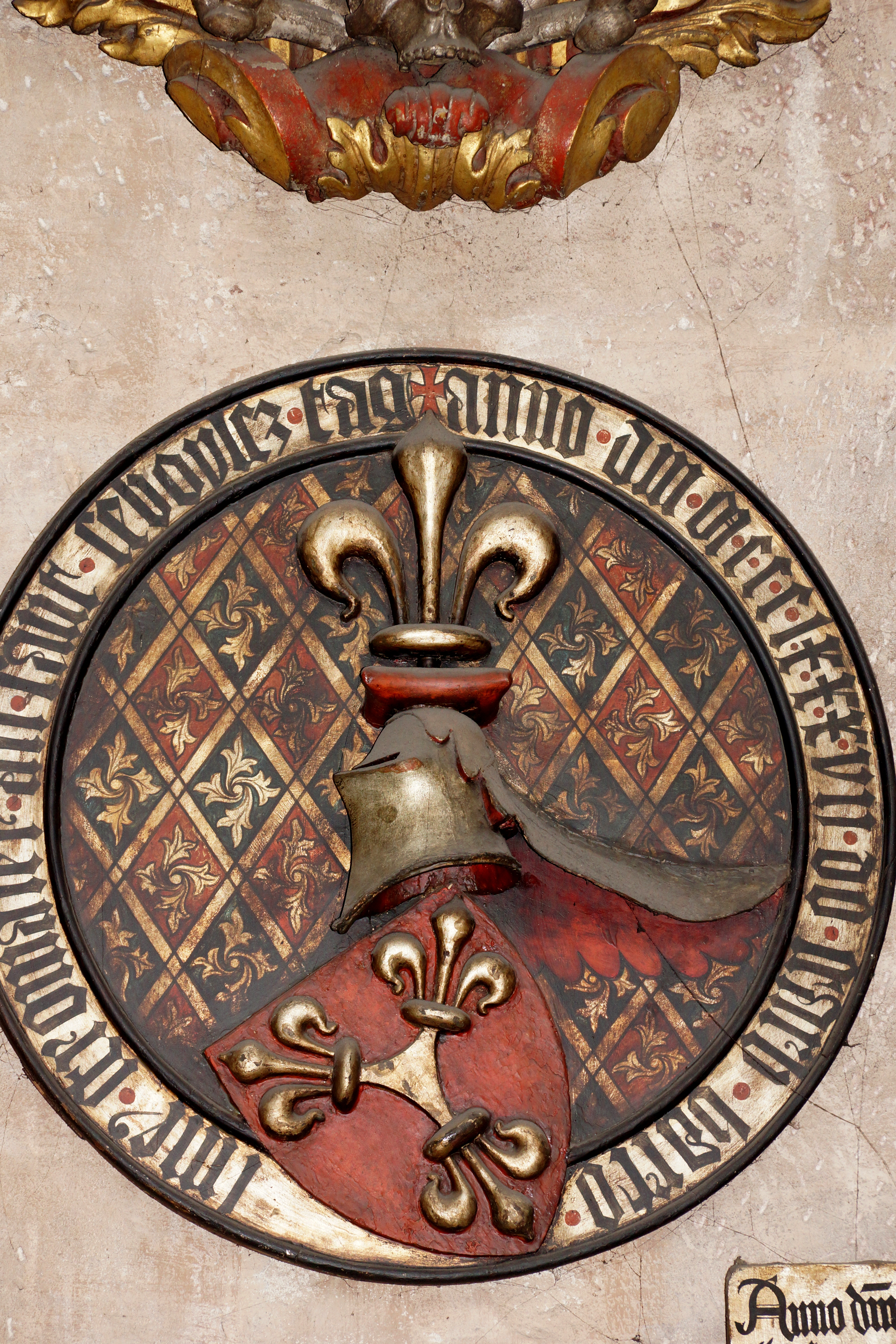
Bartolomäus Stromer's funeral shield in the Sebalduskirche (1437)

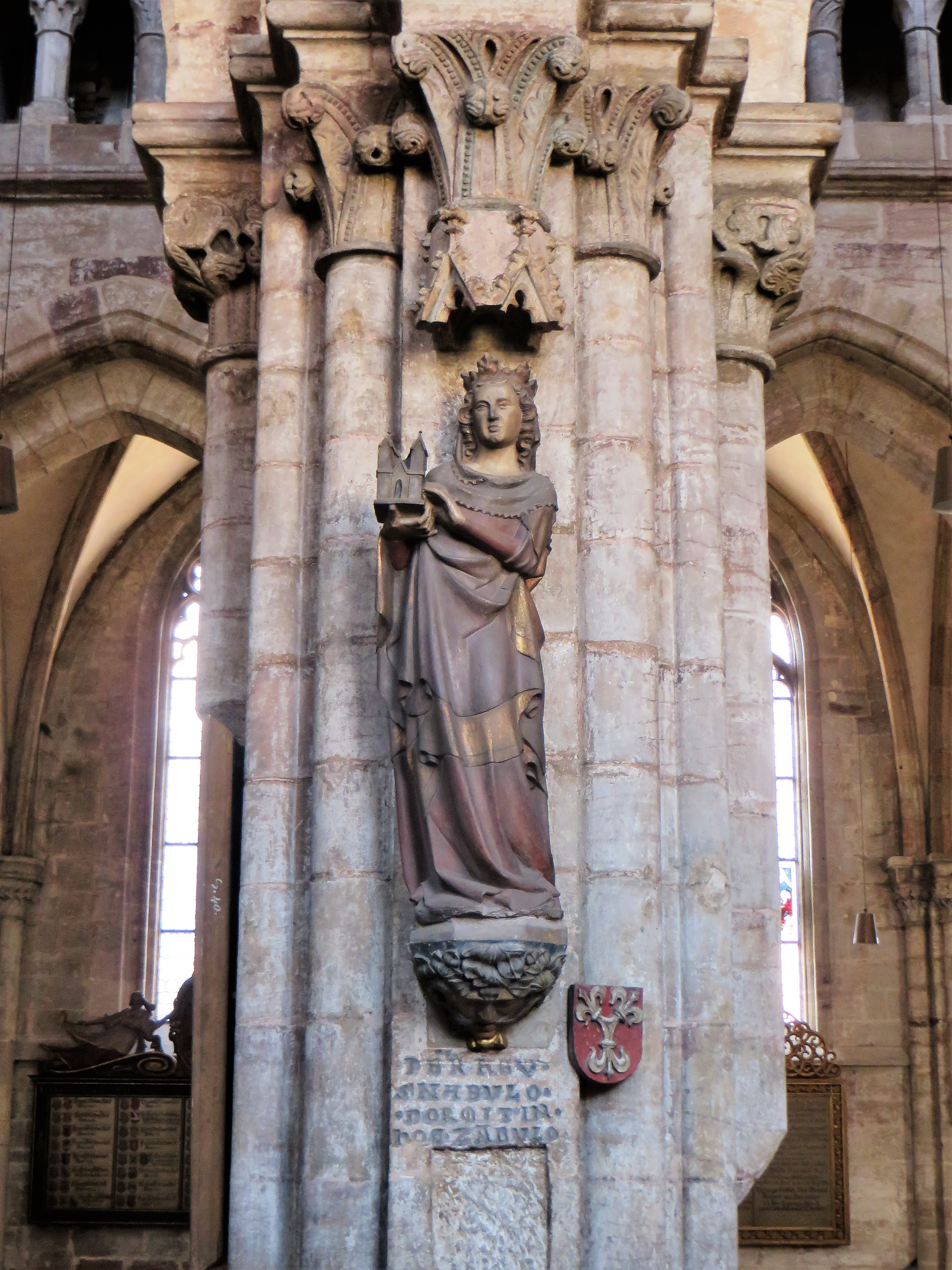
Pillar with figure of St. Empress Kunigunde, donated by the Stromers, Sebaldus Church

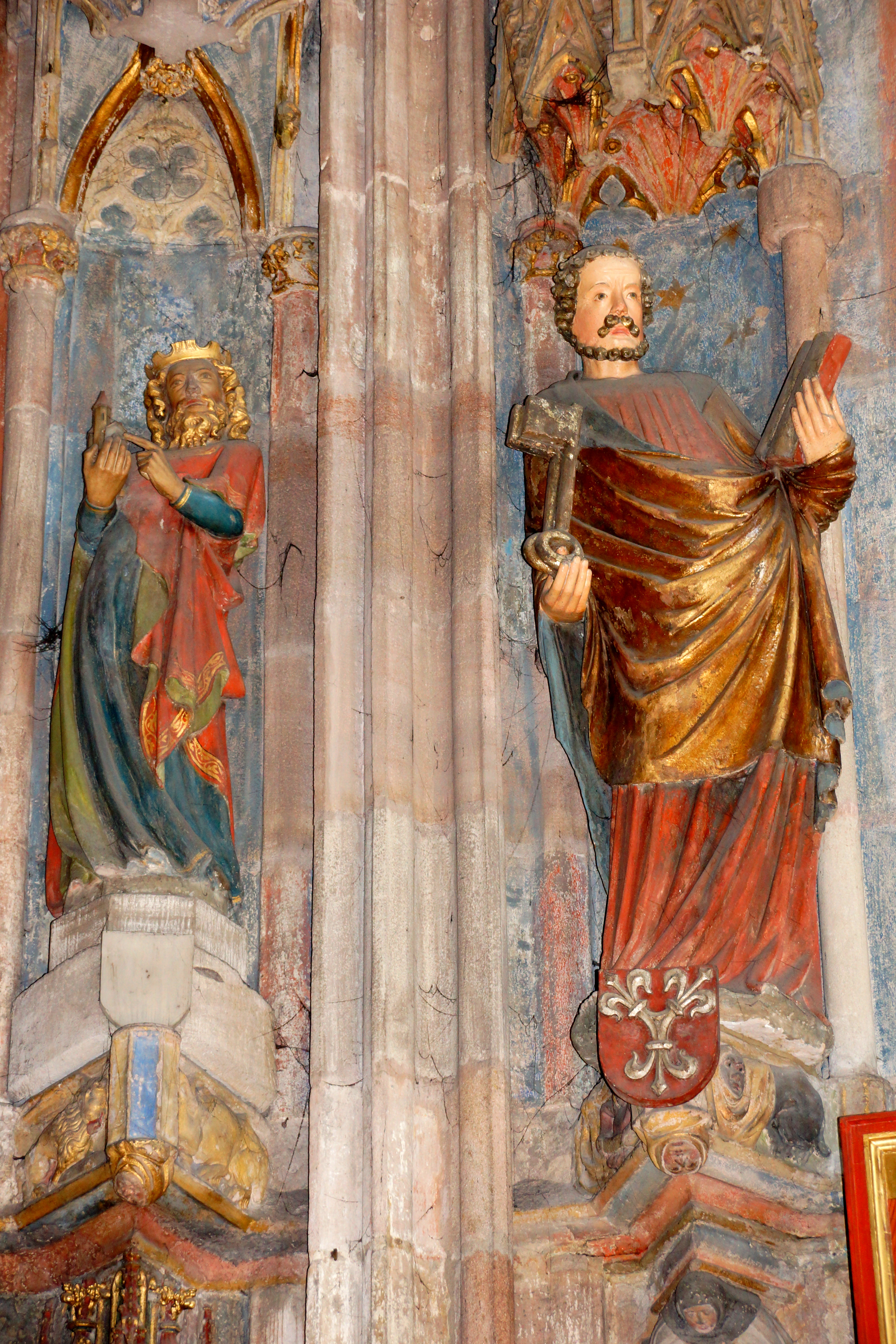
Petrus figure with stromer coat of arms, Sebaldus church

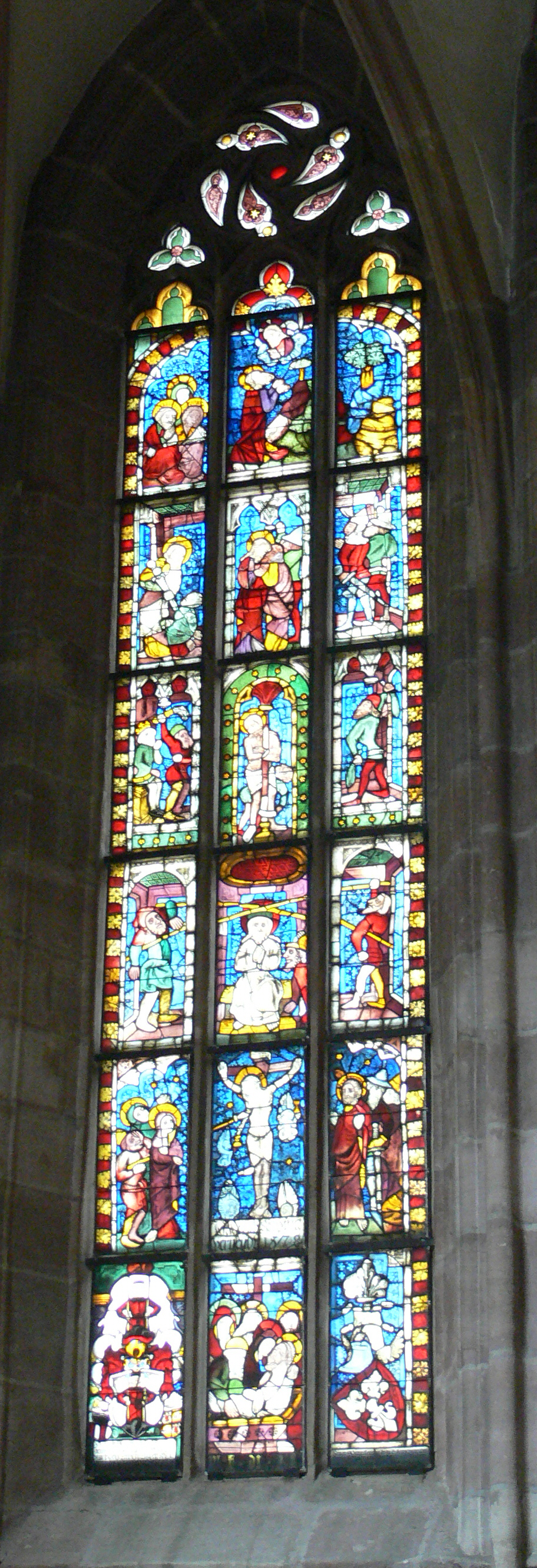
Stromer window, Martha-Kirche

== Possessions ==
In and around Nuremberg the Stromers had large possessions. Their Nuremberg ancestral home was located from 1387 behind the Lorenzkirche at the corner of Lorenzer Platz/Totengäßchen (today: area of the Stadtsparkasse), which they sold in 1795.

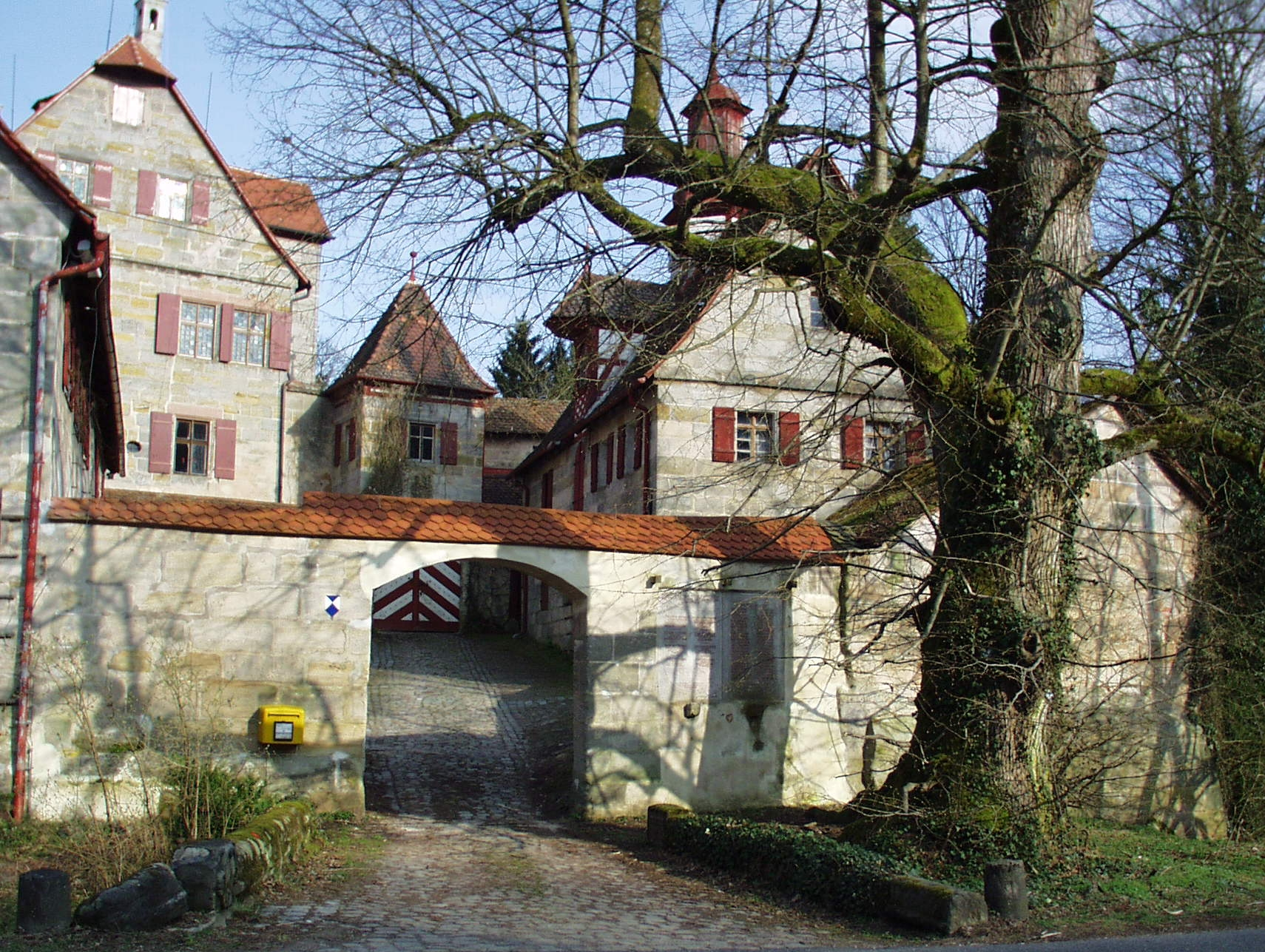
Schloss Grünsberg

Bis heute sind sie als Stiftungs-Administratoren an der Verwaltung folgender Besitzungen von patrizischen „Vorschickungen“ beteiligt:

- Grünsberg Castle, since 1766 in the possession of the Stromers, as heirs of the Haller and Paumgartner
- Land of the former Stromerschen Herrensitz in Almoshof.

As administrator of the Tetzelsche Family Foundation:

- the Tetzel castle in Kirchensittenbach (administered initially in rotation by the Pfinzing († 1764), Behaim († 1942) and Volckamer, since 1942 by the latter together with the Stromers).

Furthermore, they owned:

- 1310–1336 ca. the Zeltnerschloß in Gleißhammer
- 13??–1391 the keep (later Burgfriedschlösschen) in Nuremberg-Sündersbühl
- 1354–1576 ca. the manor and possessions in Mausgesees (district of Erlangen-Höchstadt)
- 1356–1506 the Haus zur goldenen Rose (Theresienstraße 7, the later Welserhof)
- 1368–1479 Magnificent commercial and residential building immediately north of the Frauenkirche (Hauptmarkt 16 / Obstgasse 2, selling price in 1479: 5500 florins).
- 1370–1411 estate with castle Harrlach near Allersberg
- 1391–1463 the Hadermühle (a paper mill)
- 1412–1414 Kalbensteinberg
- 1448–1454 ca. the Hallerweiherhaus (destroyed in 1944, today: site of the Federal Employment Agency).
- 1453–1491 the Unterbürg in Laufamholz
- 1559–1943 the Stromerschen manor house in Almoshof, Almoshofer Hauptstraße 84 (from 1586, destroyed in 1943, the land still owned by the family)
- 1747–???? Manor in Fischbach near Nuremberg
- 1750–1853 Castle Holnstein (Lkr. Amberg-Sulzbach)
- 1880–1891 the Waldstromerschlösschen in Reichelsdorf.

== Known family members ==
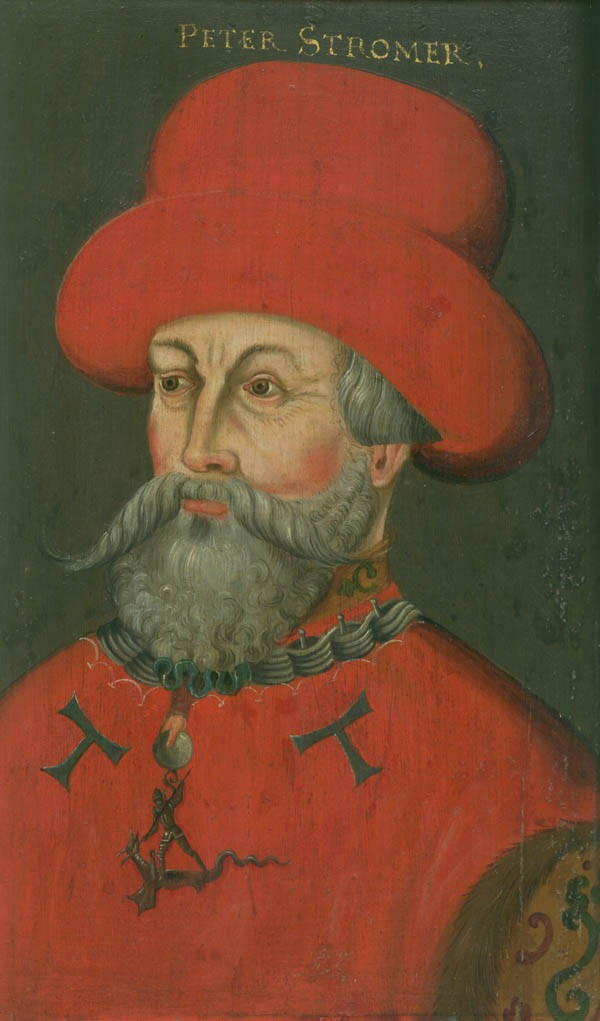
Peter I. Stromer († 1388), Rats- und Handelsherr

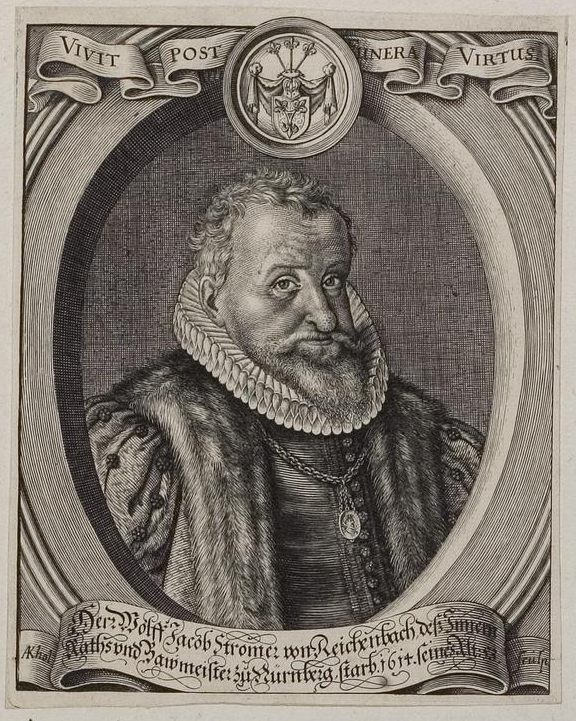
Wolf Jacob I. Stromer von Reichenbach (1561–1614), Stadtbaumeister

- Konrad III Stromer before the preachers (1303–1383), the "long Stromer", builder of the Schuldturm in Nuremberg (1323).
- Ulrich I. "Hasto" Stromer vom Zotenberg/ bei unser Frauen († 1385), banker and merchant, council of sedition 1348/49, negotiator of the fateful Markturkunde Karls IV. in Prague, which cost the lives of about 500 Jews, close connection to the Frauenkirche
- Ulrich II Stromer zur goldenen Rose († 1379), merchant lord, 1st chief captain, acquisition of the House of the Golden Rose (Theresienstr. 7), keeper of the Egidien Monastery, host of Duke Rudolf IV, window donation in the east choir of the Sebaldus Church.
- Peter I. Stromer († 1388), councilor and merchant, inventor of coniferous forest seeding.
- Ulman I. Stromer (1329–1407), councilor and merchant, mining entrepreneur, author of the Püchel von meim geslecht und von abentewr and founder of the first paper mill north of the Alps (Hadermühle), acquisition of a magnificent estate on the main market square, participation in the Jewish debt settlement and in the overthrow of King Wenceslas.
- Sigmund I Stromer zur goldenen Rose († 1435), played an important role in the rescue of the Imperial Regalia from Hungary (1424), confidant of Emperor Sigismund
- Hans IV. Stromer (1517–1592), Nuremberg city judge, the so-called Bratwurst-Stromer, imprisoned for life in the Luginsland Tower and in the Schuldturm from 1559 for betrayal of secrets and foul speeches (according to other sources for killing a foreign nobleman); his request to deliver two bratwursts to him every day was granted. After 38 years, vom Turm threw himself to his death.
- Wolf Jacob I Stromer of Reichenbach (1561–1614), city architect of Nuremberg (from 1589 to 1614): supervising the construction of the Fleischbrücke, Fortress Lichtenau, completion of the city fortifications.
- Wolf Albrecht Stromer von Reichenbach (1626–1702), author of Die edle Gartenwissenschaft (1671) and a travel description of Germany (1676)
- Christoph Friedrich I Stromer (1712–1794), Vorderster Losunger (1764–1794, longest term of office ever!) and Reichsschultheiß, hostage of Prussian Major General Friedrich Ludwig von Kleist (1762).
- Christoph Wilhelm Friedrich Stromer von Reichenbach (1737–1805), assessor at the city and marriage court, initiator of the Select of the Nuremberg Patriciate
- Freiherr Karl Otto Stromer von Reichenbach (1831–1891), First Mayor of the City of Nuremberg (1867–1891).
- Ernst Freiherr Stromer von Reichenbach (1871–1952), German paleontologist and dinosaur researcher.
- Friedrich Stromer von Reichenbach (1867–1940), philosopher of history.
- Wolfgang Freiherr Stromer von Reichenbach (1922–1999), professor of economic, social and technological history.

== Foundations ==
- Stromer window in Lorenzkirche largely re-glazed around 1500, retaining the lower row of coats of arms from the original window of the Hirschvogel family.
- Stromer window in the Marthakirche

== Additional reading and sources ==
- Diefenbacher, Michael; Hamberger, Joachim; Schmidt, Frieder; Sperling, Barbara, Stromer, in Neue Deutsche Biographie 25 (2013), pp. 574–578.
- Peter Fleischmann, Rat und Patriziat in Nürnberg. Die Herrschaft der Ratsgeschlechter vom 13. bis zum 18. Jahrhundert, Nuremberg 2008 (= Nürnberger Forschungen 31), vol. 2: Ratsherren und Ratsgeschlechter.
- Ernst Stromer von Reichenbach: Our Ancestors in the Imperial City of Nuremberg 1250 to 1806. Nuremberg: Fromman, 1951, 44 pp.
- Wolfgang Stromer von Reichenbach: The Nuremberg trading company Gruber-Podmer-Stromer in the 15th century. Dissertation University of Erlangen-Nuremberg. Nuremberg: Association for the History of the City of Nuremberg, 1963, 192 pp. (Nuremberg Research; vol. 7)
- Adalbert Scharr: Die Nürnberger Reichsforstmeisterfamilie Waldstromer bis 1400 und Beiträge zur älteren Genealogie der Familien Forstmeister und Stromer von Reichenbach. In: Mitteilungen des Vereins für Geschichte der Stadt Nürnberg, vol. 52, 1963/64, pp. 1–41.
- Christoph von Imhoff (ed.): Famous Nurembergers from nine centuries. Nuremberg: Hofmann, 1984, 425 p., ISBN 3-87191-088-0; 2nd, erg. u. erw. edition, 1989, 459 p.; new edition: Edelmann GmbH Buchhandlung, October 2000.
- Michael Diefenbacher, Rudolf Endres, ed. (2000), Stromer von Reichenbach, patrician family, Nuremberg City Lexicon (Stadtlexikon Nürnberg) (in German) (2nd, revised ed.), Nuremberg: W. Tümmels Verlag, ISBN 3-921590-69-8
- Pfefferwette und Safranschau, Gewürzspekulationen im Mittelalter, BR 1997, A film by Bernhard Graf, with statements by Prof. Dr. Wolfgang Stromer von Reichenbach
