= Ludwig Scholz =

German politician

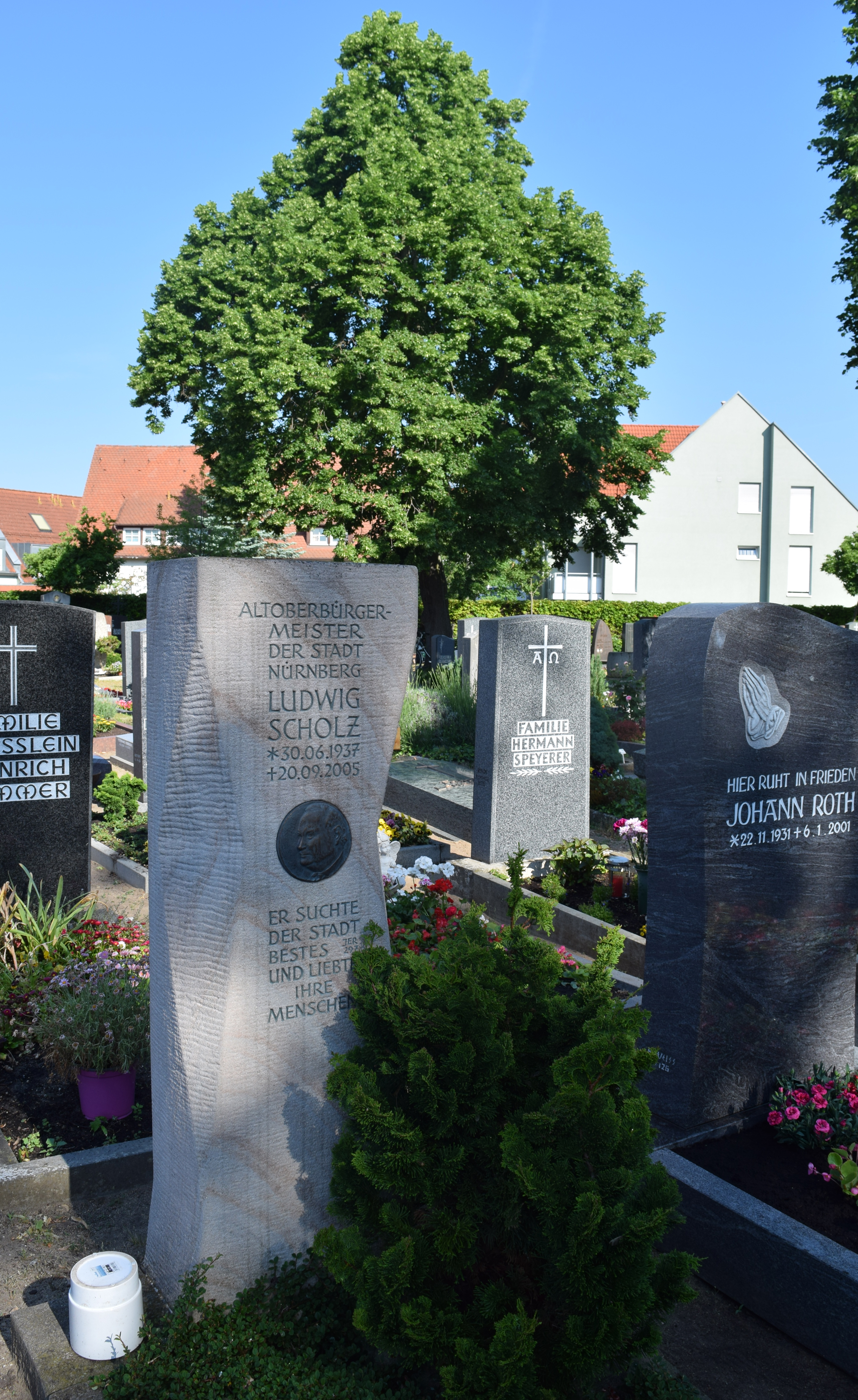
Grave of Ludwig Scholz in the cemetery of Nuremberg-Eibach

Ludwig Scholz (30 June 1937 – 20 September 2005) was a German politician of the CSU and the mayor of Nuremberg.

== Life ==
Scholz was born in Juliusberg, Landkreis Oels, Lower Silesia, now Dobroszyce, Oleśnica County, Poland, in 1937. He died on 20 September 2005 in Nuremberg, Bavaria.

== Politics ==
Ludwig Scholz was the surprise winner of the Nuremberg municipal elections in 1996. He became successor of the longtime mayor Peter Schönlein, but lost the next elections in 2002 to Ulrich Maly.

Scholz was the first Catholic mayor of Nuremberg since the Reformation.
