= Christian Gottfried Lorsch =

German politician (1773–1830)

Christian Gottfried Lorsch (11 September 1773, in Nuremberg – 19 February 1830, in Nuremberg) was the first civilian mayor of Nuremberg after the city's incorporation into the Kingdom of Bavaria, serving from 1818 to 1821.

Lorsch was a doctor of law and practiced as an attorney there beginning in 1796. In 1801 he became a so-called Genannter, a member of the city's board of aldermen. Following a Gemeindeedikt of King Maximilian I Joseph of Bavaria that required the establishment of a local government with a city council, he was elected First Mayor on 26 September 1818. In 1821 he failed to win reelection, but became a member of the "College of Community Overseers" (Kollegium der Gemeindebevollmächtigten, comparable to today's city council).

With Johannes Scharrer, he founded the city's first savings bank in 1821. A street in the Gleißhammer section of the city is named after him.
