= List of mayors of Nuremberg =

This is a list of mayors of Nuremberg (Oberbürgermeister der Stadt Nürnberg) since 1818:

- 1818–1821: Christian Gottfried Lorsch
- 1821–1853: Jakob Friedrich Binder
- 1854–1867: Maximilian von Waechter
- 1867–1891: Otto Freiherr von Stromer
- 1892–1913: Georg Ritter von Schuh (FVP)
- 1913–1919: Otto Geßler (FVP)
- 1920–1933: Hermann Luppe (DDP)
- 1933–1945: Willy Liebel (NSDAP)
- 1945: Julius Rühm (NSDAP)
- 1945: Martin Treu (SPD)
- 1945–1948: Hans Ziegler (SPD)
- 1948–1951: Otto Ziebill (SPD)
- 1952–1957: Otto Bärnreuther (SPD)
- 1957–1987: Andreas Urschlechter (SPD; independent from 1982)
- 1987–1996: Peter Schönlein (SPD)
- 1996–2002: Ludwig Scholz (CSU)
- 2002–2020: Ulrich Maly (SPD)
- since 2020: Marcus König (CSU)

== See also ==
- List of people from Nuremberg
- Timeline of Nuremberg
