= Timeline of Würzburg =

The following is a timeline of the history of the city of Würzburg, Bavaria, Germany.

== Prior to 19th century ==
- 706 - Marienkirche, Würzburg (church) dedicated.
- 741 - Roman Catholic Diocese of Würzburg established.
- 788 - Cathedral consecrated.
- 1042 - Sankt Burkard church built.
- 1057 - Neumünster Abbey founded.
- 1165 - Imperial Diet held in Würzburg.
- 1180 - Imperial Diet held in Würzburg.
- 1189 - Rebuilt Würzburg Cathedral consecrated.
- 1287 - Synod and Diet of Würzburg at which an imperial peace is declared
- 1377 - Marienkapelle construction begins.
- 1456 - Rathaus Würzburg rebuilt.
- 1479 - Printing press in operation.
- 1525 - Battle of Wurzburg fought during the German Peasants' War.
- 1576 - Julius Hospital founded.
- 1582 - University of Würzburg active.
- 1619 - Universitätsbibliothek Würzburg (library) founded.
- 1643 - Würzburger Hofbräu (brewery) established.
- 1691 - Hauger Stiftskirche (church) built.
- 1703 - Mainbrücke (stone bridge) built.
- 1744 - Würzburg Residence (palace) built.
- 1789 - St. Stephan (Würzburg) church built.
- 1796 - 3 September: Battle of Würzburg fought during the French Revolutionary Wars.

== 19th century ==
- 1803
  - Würzburg secularized.
  - City becomes part of Bavaria.
- 1805 - Grand Duke of Würzburg Ferdinand in power per Treaty of Pressburg.
- 1815 - Würzburg becomes part of Bavaria again.
- 1817 - Koenig & Bauer manufactory in business.
- 1837 - University's Martin von Wagner Museum opens.
- 1838 - Würzburg becomes part of the Regierungsbezirk Unterfranken und Aschaffenburg (administrative region).
- 1848 - Wurzburg Bishops' Conference (1848) held.
- 1858 - Population: 36,052.
- 1866 - Würzburg "bombarded and taken by the Prussians."
- 1872 - Stadtbücherei Würzburg (library) founded.
- 1887 - Luitpold Bridge built.

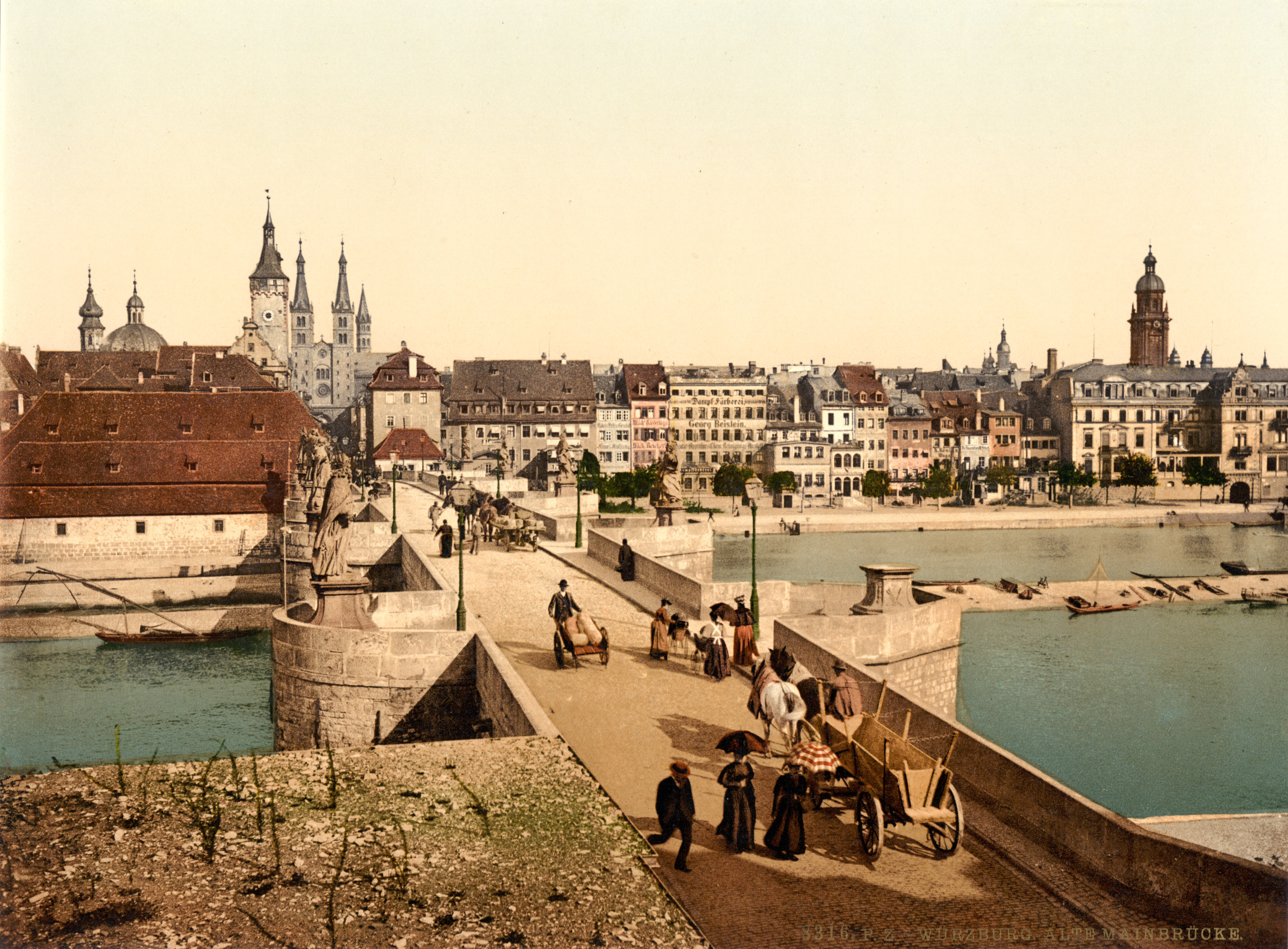
Würzburg in the 1890s

- 1892 - Horse-drawn tram begins operating.
- 1894 - Ludwigsbrücke (Würzburg) (bridge) built.
- 1895 - Rontgen discovers X-radiation.
- 1900 - Electric tram begins operating.

== 20th century ==
- 1904 - Würzburger FV (football club) formed.
- 1919
  - SV Heidingsfeld (football club) formed.
  - Population: 86,571.
- 1921 - Mozart Festival Würzburg begins.
- 1930 - Heidingsfeld and Heuchelhof become part of city.^{(de)}
- 1943 – Subcamp of the Flossenbürg concentration camp founded. Its prisoners were mostly Poles and Soviets.
- 1945
  - 16 March: Bombing of Würzburg in World War II.
  - 22 March: Subcamp of the Flossenbürg concentration camp dissolved. Prisoners deported to the main Flossenbürg camp.
  - 31 March: Battle of Würzburg begins.
  - 6 April: Battle ends. Americans capture the city.
  - Main-Post newspaper begins publication.
- 1952 - Sabbie di Capri (Pizzeria) in business.
- 1954 - New Würzburg Hauptbahnhof (train station) opens.
- 1971 - University of Applied Sciences Würzburg-Schweinfurt established.
- 1974 - Rottenbauer becomes part of city.^{(de)}
- 1976 - Oberdürrbach and Unterdürrbach become part of city.^{(de)}
- 1978 - Lengfeld and Versbach become part of city.^{(de)}
- 1991 - Hanover–Würzburg high-speed railway begins operating.

== 21st century ==
- 2010 - Population: 133,799.^{(de)}
- 2012 - Refugee protest.
- 2014 - Christian Schuchardt becomes mayor.
- 2016 - 18 July: Train attack near Würzburg.
- 2021 - 25 June: Stabbing.

== See also ==
- History of Würzburg
- List of mayors of Würzburg (in German)
- List of bishops of Würzburg
- History of Franconia region
- Timelines of other cities in the state of Bavaria: Augsburg, Munich, Nuremberg

== Bibliography ==
=== in English ===
- "Würzburg". Chambers's Encyclopaedia. London. 1901. hdl:2027/uc2.ark:/13960/t56d64f6t.
- "Würzburg", Southern Germany (12th ed.), Leipzig: Karl Baedeker, 1914, OCLC 2011248
- "Würzburg" . Encyclopædia Britannica. Vol. 28 (11th ed.). 1910. p. 860.
- Trudy Ring, ed. (1995). "Würzburg". Northern Europe. International Dictionary of Historic Places. Fitzroy Dearborn. ISBN 978-1-136-63944-9.

=== in German ===
- "Würzburg". Brockhaus' Konversations-Lexikon (in German). Vol. 16 (14th ed.). Leipzig: Brockhaus. 1896. hdl:2027/njp.32101064064536.
- Gerhard Köbler (2007). "Würzburg". Historisches Lexikon der Deutschen Länder (in German) (7th ed.). Munich: C.H. Beck. p. 810+. ISBN 978-3-406-54986-1.
- Frank Kleinehagenbrock (2012). "Wurzburg". In Wolfgang Adam; Siegrid Westphal (eds.). Handbuch kultureller Zentren der Frühen Neuzeit: Städte und Residenzen im alten deutschen Sprachraum (in German). De Gruyter. pp. 2293–2332. ISBN 978-3-11-029555-9.
