= Ulman Stromer =

Trader and councillor of Nuremberg (1329–1407)

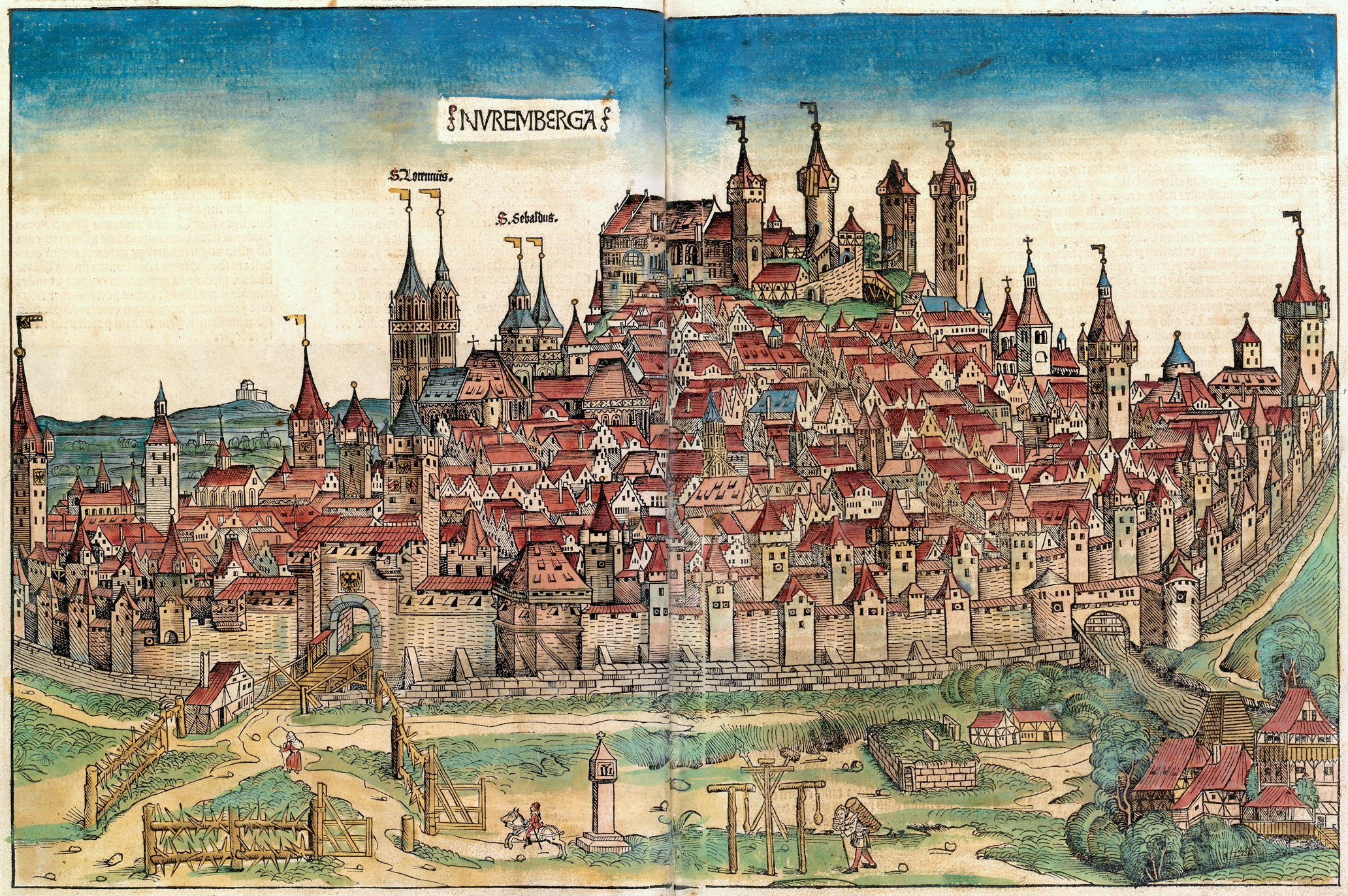
- Stromer's paper mill in the Nuremberg Chronicle of 1493. The building complex is at the lower right corner, outside the city perimeter.
- Born: 6 January 1329
- Died: 3 April 1407 (aged 78)
- Occupations: long-distance trader, factory owner
- Known for: councillor of Nuremberg
- Notable work: first permanent paper mill north of the Alps, at the Pegnitz river

Ulman Stromer (6 January 1329 – 3 April 1407) was a German long-distance trader, factory owner and councillor of Nuremberg, then a free imperial city of the Holy Roman Empire. He ran the family enterprise, one of the largest of the prospering trade center, from 1370 until his death by the plague in 1407.

In 1390, he established the first permanent paper mill north of the Alps, at the Pegnitz river not far from the city.:

In the name of Christ, amen. Anno Domini 1390, I, Ulman Stromer, started at making paper on St. John's day at the Solstice, and began to set up a wheel in the Gleissmühle, and Clos Obsser was the first who came to work.

— Ulman Stromer, "The First German Paper-maker", Popular Science Monthly Vol. 42

Stromer decided to start a paper-mill after he recognised the success that this business was having in Italy. In order to secure the know-how he employed the Italian brothers Marco and Francisco di Marchia and their boy Bartolomeo, bringing them to Nuremberg.

== Sources ==
- Stromer, Wolfgang von (1960), "Das Handelshaus der Stromer von Nürnberg und die Geschichte der ersten deutschen Papiermühle", Vierteljahrschrift für Sozial und Wirtschaftsgeschichte, 47: 81–104
- Stromer, Wolfgang von (1993), "Große Innovationen der Papierfabrikation in Spätmittelalter und Frühneuzeit", Technikgeschichte, 60 (1): 1–6
