= Fleisch Bridge =

Late Renaissance bridge in Nuremberg, Germany

Fleisch Bridge Fleischbrücke
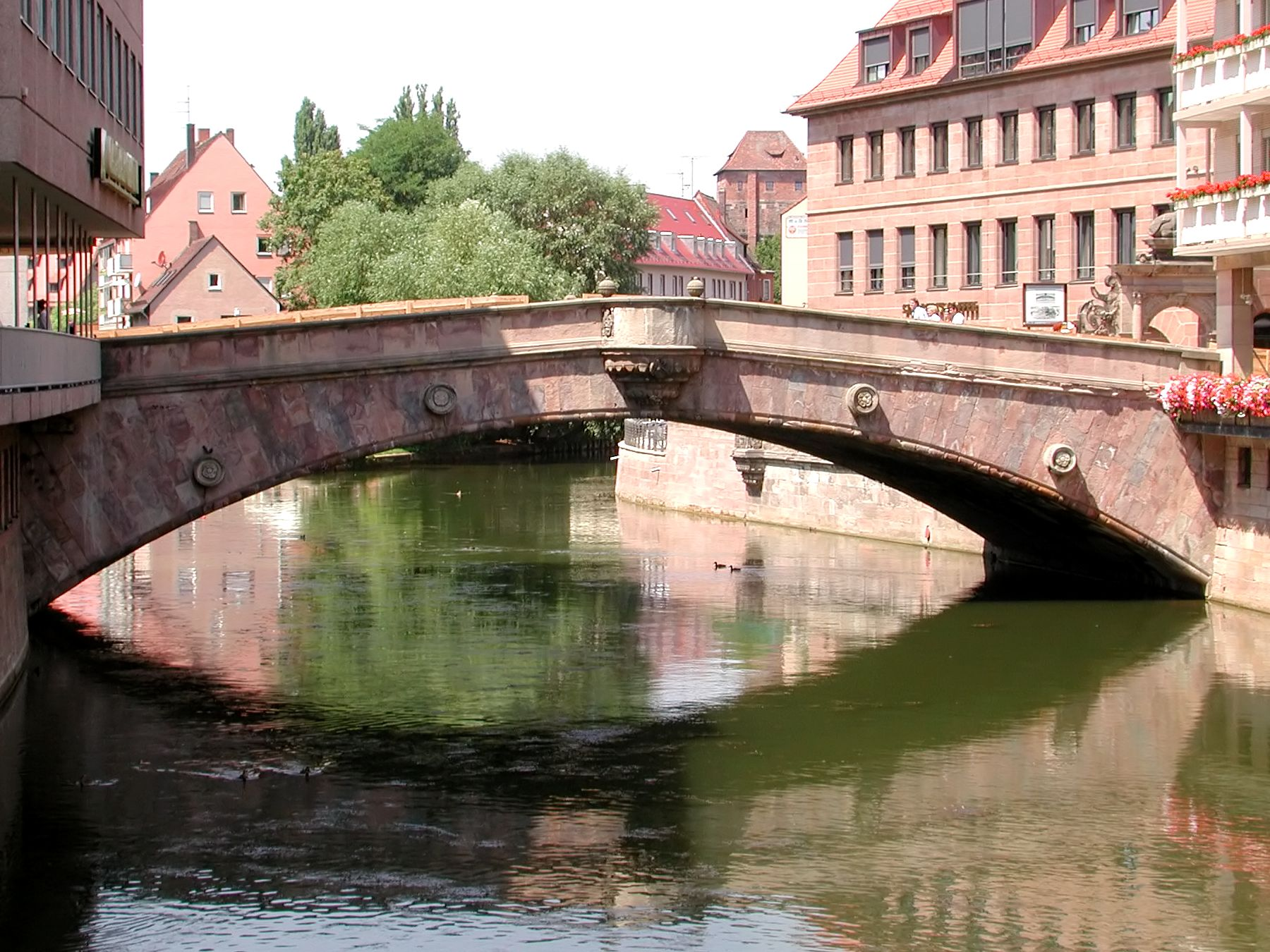
- Sideview of the Fleisch Bridge
- Coordinates: 49°27′11″N 11°04′37″E
- Carries: Connection between districts of St. Sebald and St. Lorenz
- Crosses: Pegnitz
- Locale: Nuremberg, Germany

Characteristics
- Design: Segmental arch bridge
- Material: Stone
- Width: 15.3 m
- Longest span: 27 m
- No. of spans: 1
- Clearance below: 4.2 m

History
- Construction start: 1596
- Construction end: 1598

Location
- Interactive map of Fleisch Bridge; Fleischbrücke

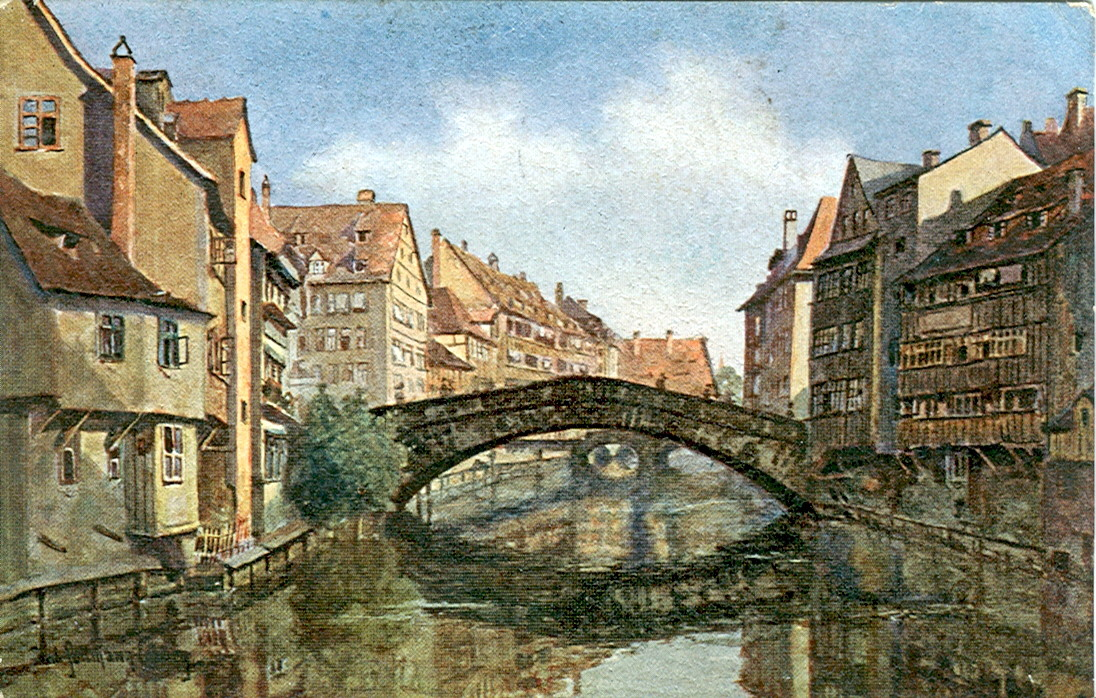
Postcard from 1915

The Fleisch Bridge (German: Fleischbrücke or "Meat Bridge") or Pegnitz Bridge (Pegnitzbrücke) is a late Renaissance bridge in Nuremberg, Germany. The bridge crosses the river Pegnitz in the center of the old town, linking the districts St. Sebald and St. Lorenz along the axis of the main market. The single-arch bridge was built between 1596 and 1598 and replaced an earlier mixed construction of stone and wood which had been repeatedly destroyed by flood.

The Fleisch Bridge is notable for several technical features that were advanced for its time. These include an unusual large width of 15.3 m, and a clear span of 27 m which made it the largest masonry bridge arch in Germany at the time of its construction. With a rise of only 4.2 m, the arch features a span-to-rise ratio of 6.4 to 1, giving the bridge an almost unprecedented flat profile.

This, however, came at the cost of high lateral thrusts even for a segmental arch bridge. This problem was solved by a particularly innovative construction of the abutments which were built onto 2000 wooden piles, 400 of which were rammed obliquely into the grounds. A very similar arrangement of the abutments had also been implemented slightly earlier at the Rialto bridge, leading to speculations about a technology transfer from Venice, with which Nuremberg shared close trade links. A recent in-depth research, however, stresses the originality of the Fleisch Bridge on grounds of technical differences between the two bridges.

The Fleisch Bridge has practically remained unchanged since the addition of a portal in 1599 and survived World War II almost unscathed. A Latin inscription at the portal reads: Omnia habent ortus suaque in crementa sed ecce quem cernis nunquam bos fuit hic Vitulus. ("All things have a beginning and grow, but the ox upon whom you now look was never a calf.")

== Sources ==
- Kaiser, Christiane: Die Fleischbrücke in Nürnberg (1596-1598), Cottbus, 2005, Dissertation
- Von Stromer, Wolfgang: "Pegnitzbrücke Nürnberg (Fleischbrücke)", in: Steinbrücken in Deutschland, Beton-Verlag, 1988, pp. 162–167 ISBN 3-7640-0240-9
- Pechstein, Klaus: "Allerlei Visierungen und Abriss wegen der Fleischbrücken", in: Anzeiger des Germanischen Nationalmuseums, 1978, 72–89.
