= St. Martha, Nuremberg =

Saint Martha
- Marthakirche
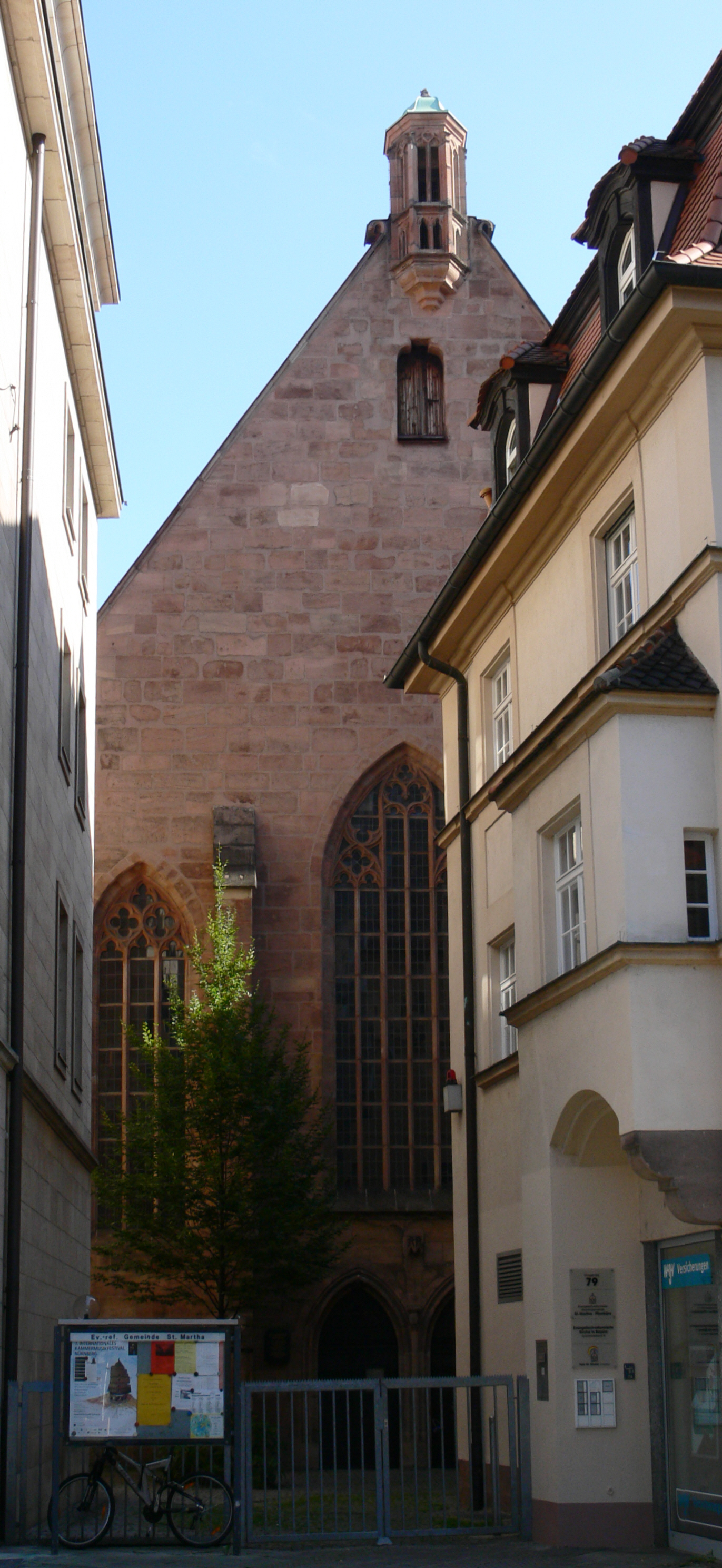
- St Martha's Church, Nuremberg (view from the street)
- Saint Martha
- 49.448611°N 11.080833°E
- Address: Königstraße 79; 90402 Nürnberg
- Country: Germany
- Denomination: Evangelical Reformed Church
- Previous denomination: Roman Catholic

St. Martha is a medieval church in the old town of Nuremberg in southern Germany. It is dedicated to Saint Martha. Since 1800 it has been a Reformed church, the community of which forms part of the Evangelical Reformed Church (regional church).

== History ==
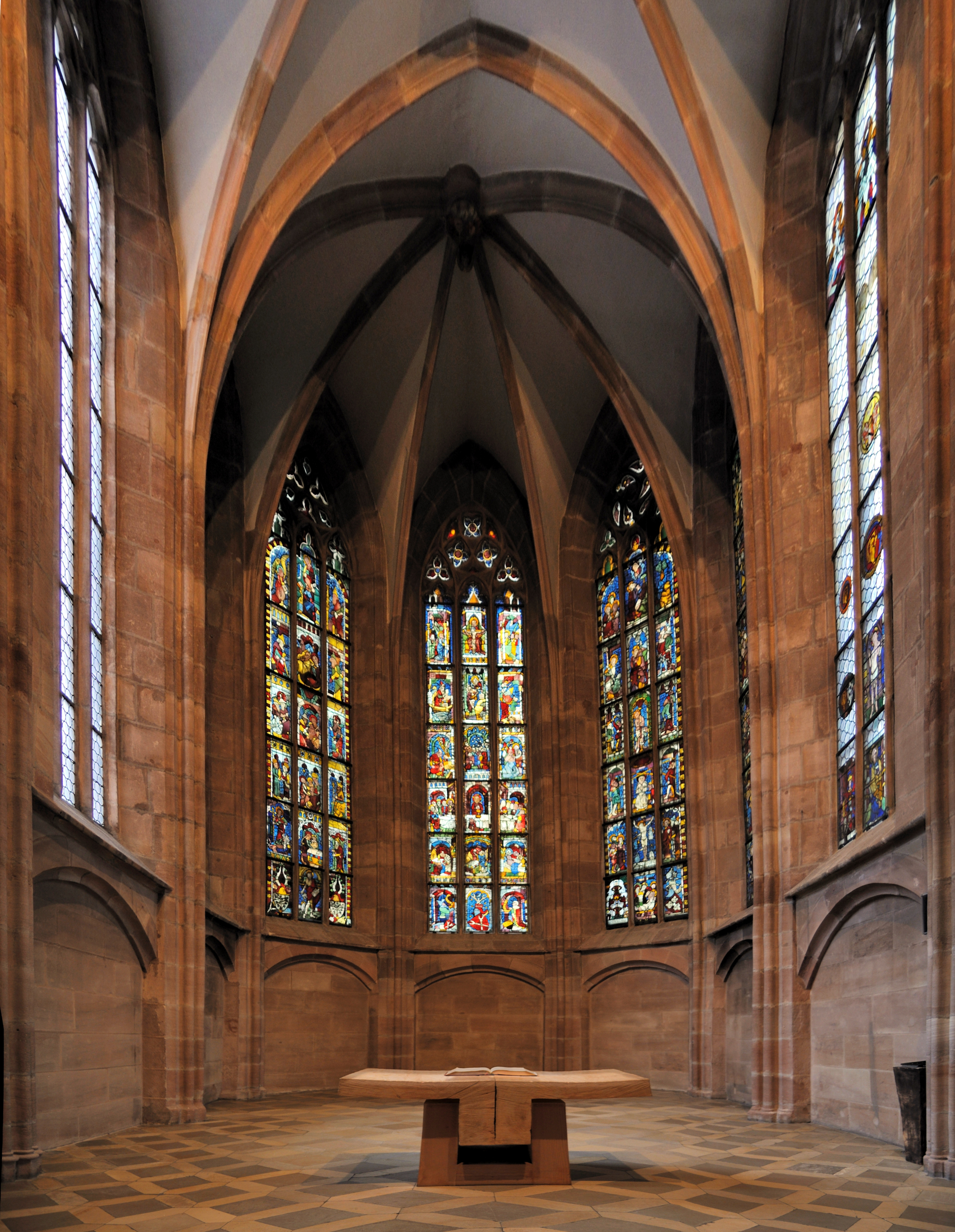
Medieval windows in the chancel

Conrad and John von Waldstromer founded the church and the associated hospital in 1356, and the church was consecrated in 1385. From 1390 to 1430, wealthy Nuremberg families endowed the church with a series of stained-glass windows placed in its chancel.

As a result of the Reformation, the church was closed in 1526. It was then used as a theatre by the Nuremberg Meistersingers. In 1614, plays were forbidden in churches, and by 1627 it was restored to use as a church.

The church was only lightly damaged during the Second World War, when a bomb hit the roof and the central chancel arch. By 1946 it was fully restored.

Situated near the central railway station, St Martha's is set back from busy Königstraße and can easily be overlooked. An alleyway between two houses leads to the church entrance.

=== Fire 5 June 2014 ===
On 5 June 2014 a fire broke out leaving the interior devastated and severely affecting the church's structural integrity. Fortunately the stained-glass windows in the chancel had been removed beforehand due to renovations and thus weren't damaged. It was decided not to reconstruct the church in its original state. Instead a modern interior design by architect Florian Nagler was adopted. A simple, raised wooden ceiling encloses the restored walls which still show traces of the fire. The chancel remains in its historical shape, decorated with the stained windows. During restoration and reconstruction works the parish held its service in neighbouring, Roman Catholic St Klara church. St Martha was reopened on 10 November 2018.

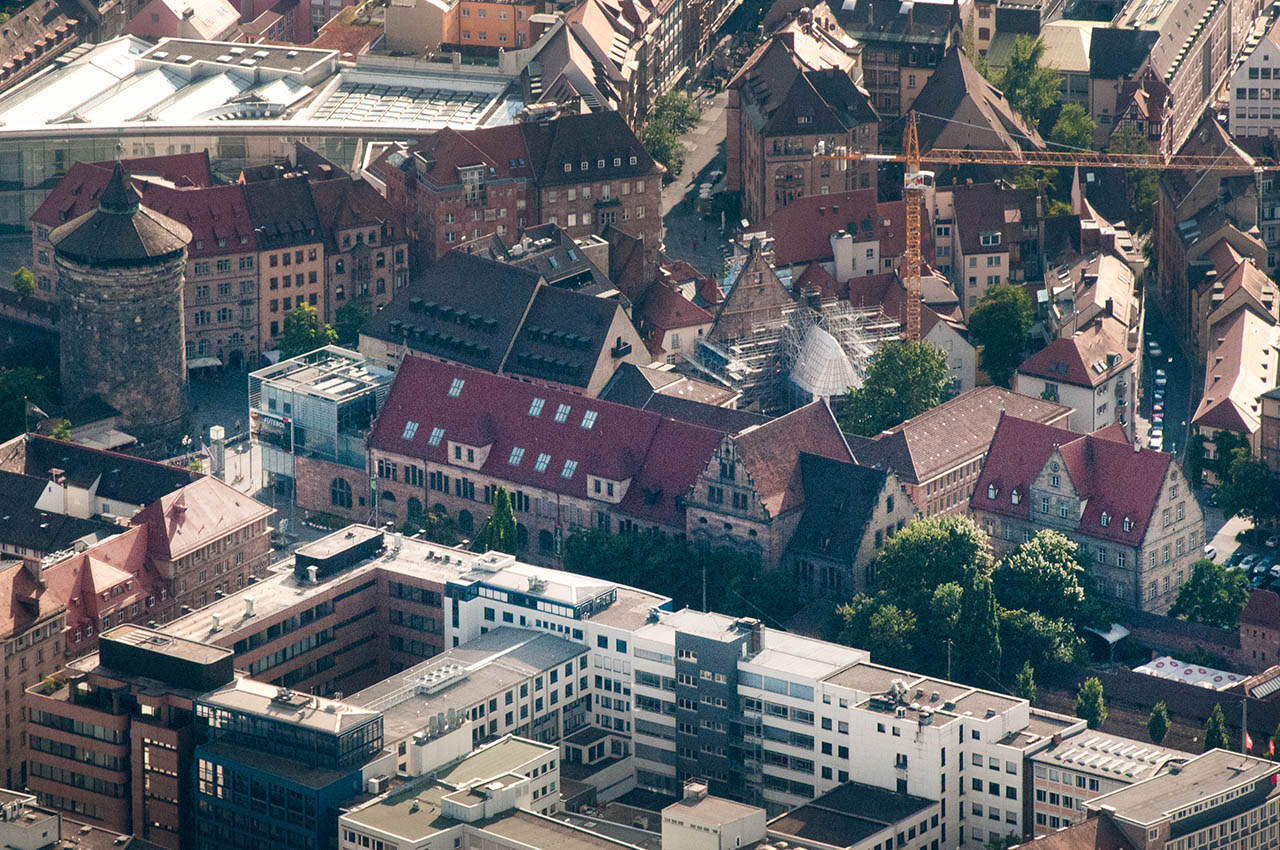
Construction site at the ruins of St Martha's next to the crane

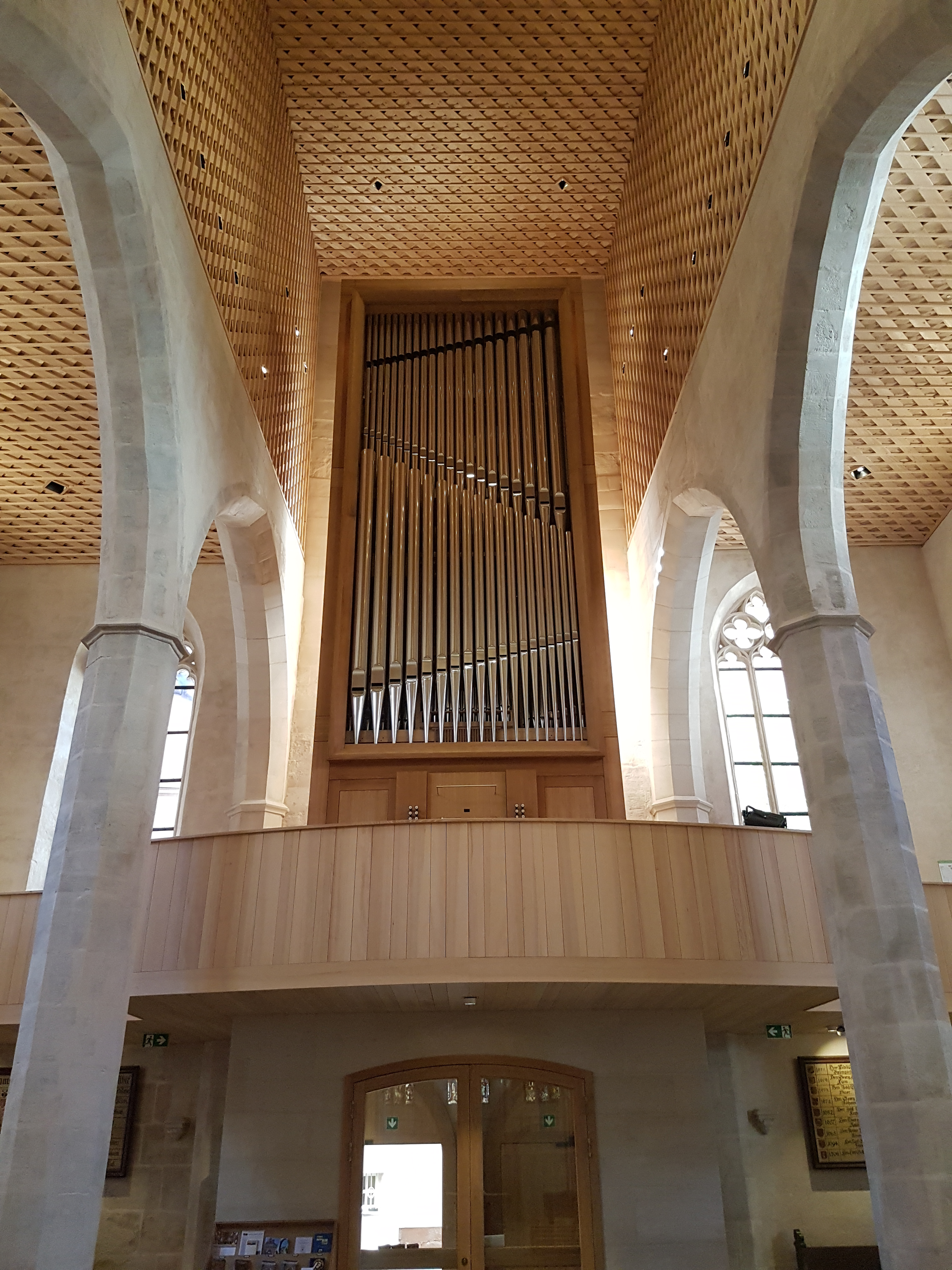
The new organ and ceiling after reconstruction

== Sources ==
- This page is based on the article on German Wikipedia.
