= Ulrich Maly =

German politician (born 1960)

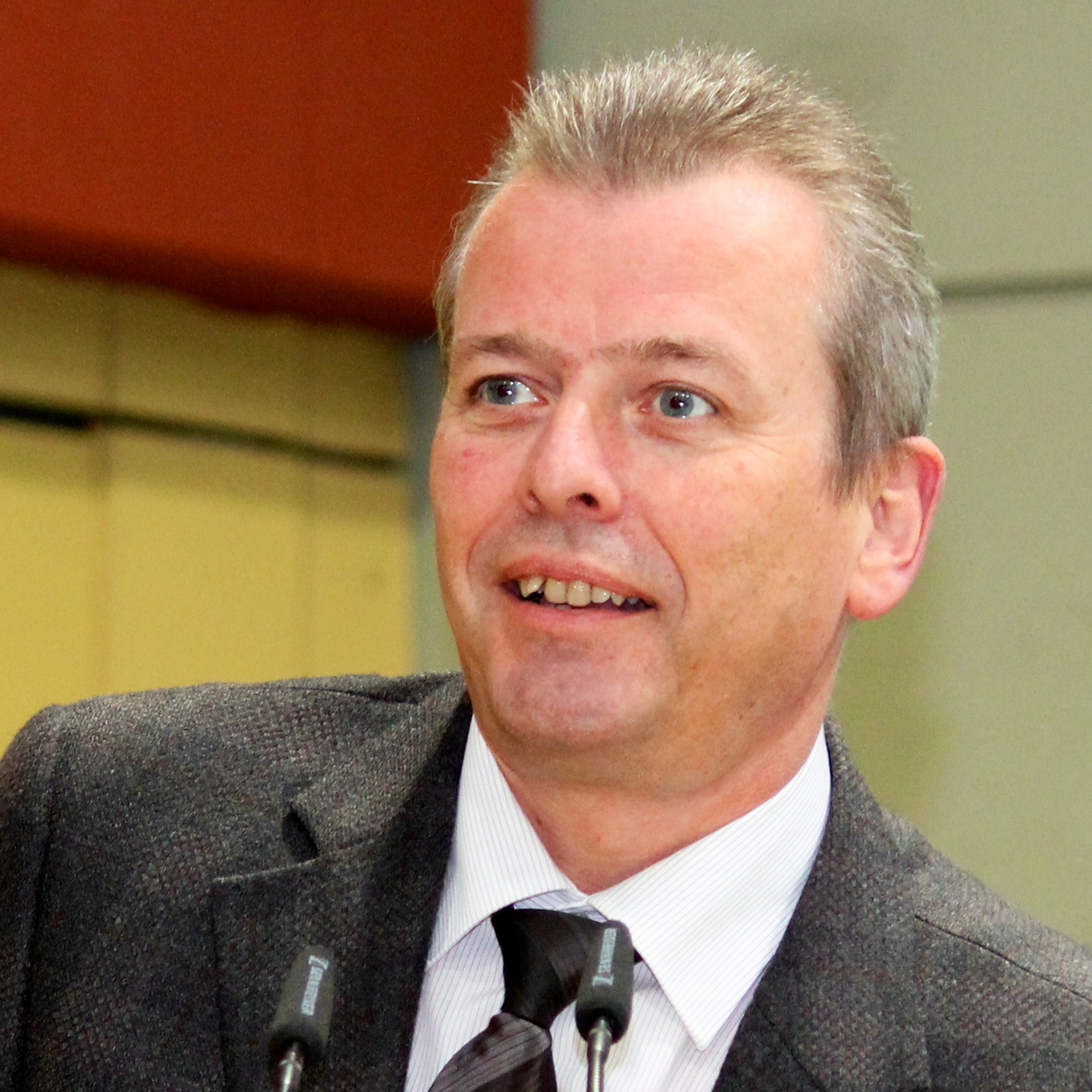
- Ulrich Maly in 2012

Mayor of Nuremberg
- Incumbent
- Assumed office 1 May 2002

Personal details
- Born: 8 August 1960 (age 65) Nuremberg, West Germany
- Occupation: Politician

Dr. Ulrich Maly (born 8 August 1960) is a German politician, a member of the Social Democratic Party of Germany who served as Mayor of Nuremberg from 2002 till 2020.

== Early life and education ==
Ulrich Maly was born in Nuremberg, Bavaria, and educated at the elementary school in the Amberger Straße and the Johannes Scharrer Gymnasium. After the Zivildienst at a retirement home at Mimberg near Burgthann, he studied economics at the University of Erlangen-Nuremberg, majoring in economic policy and public law. In 1990 he received his Dr. rer. pol. with a dissertation on "Economy and environment in municipal development policy."

== Political career ==
From 1967 Maly was involved honorarily in the Sozialistische Jugend Deutschlands – Die Falken (Socialist Youth of Germany – Falcons) and was delegated by them as the chairman of the Kreisjugendring (District Youth Association) Nuremberg-City. Since 1984 Maly has been a member of the SPD.

In 1990, Maly became whip of the SPD city council faction. From 1996 to 2002 Maly held the appointment of the city treasurer of Nuremberg. Since 1 May 2002 Ulrich Maly has been the Lord Mayor of the city of Nuremberg. In November 2005 he was elected to the SPD federal executive council.

Maly was shortlisted for the 2008 World Mayor award.

In March 2019, Maly announced that he would not stand in the 2020 local elections but instead resign from active politics by the end of his term.

== Other activities ==
=== Corporate boards ===
- 1. FC Nürnberg, Member of the Supervisory Board (since 2007)
- Messe Nürnberg, Member of the Supervisory Board
- N-ERGIE, Member of the Supervisory Board
- Nuremberg Airport, Member of the Supervisory Board
- Chairman of the board of several municipal subsidiaries, like the "Städtische Werke Nürnberg" (Municipal Plants Nuremberg), the "Wohnungsbaugesellschaft Nürnberg mbH" (House Building Company Nuremberg)

=== Non-profit organizations ===
- Member in the board of the "Bayerischer Städtetag" and in the executive board of the "Deutscher Städtetag"
- Member of the Committee of the Regions in Brussels as a deputy of the Deutscher Städtetag
- Nuremberg International Human Rights Award, Member of the Jury
- Foundation council chairman of the "Stiftung Staatstheater Nürnberg" (Foundation State Theatre Nuremberg)
- Chairman of several foundations, e.g. the "Zukunftsstiftung der Sparkasse Nürnberg" (Future foundation of the Savings Bank Nuremberg)
- Board of the "Congress- und Tourismuszentrale Nürnberg e. V." (Nuremberg Central Office of Congress and Tourism) and the "Deutsch-Amerikanisches Institut (DAI)" (German-American Institute) and other associations.
