= Happurg =

- Municipality
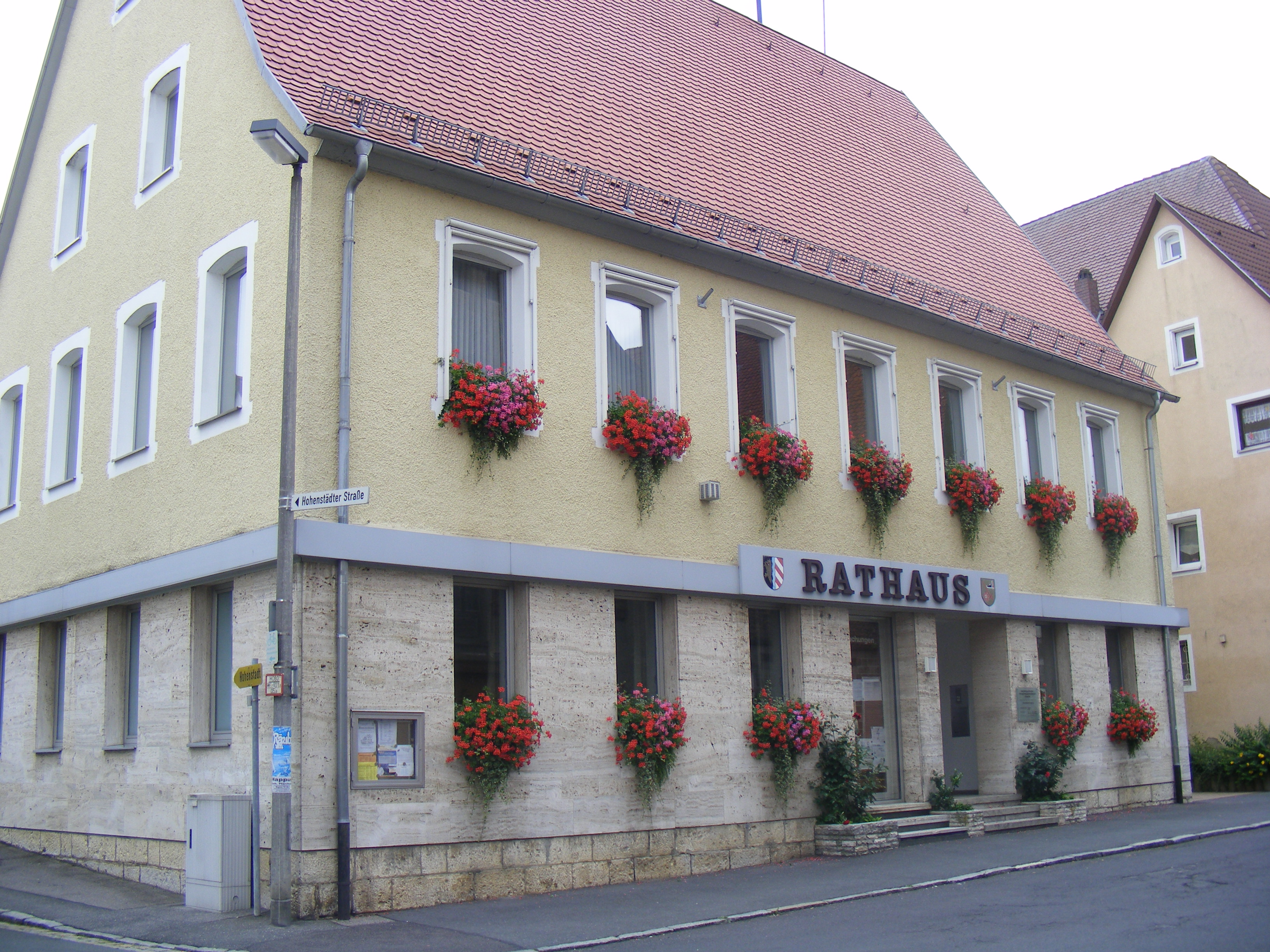
- Town hall

- Coat of arms

- Location of Happurg within Nürnberger Land district
- Interactive map of Happurg
- Location within Germany Location within Bavaria
- Coordinates: 49°29′35″N 11°28′16″E
- Country: Germany
- State: Bavaria
- Admin. region: Mittelfranken
- District: Nürnberger Land
- Municipal assoc.: Happurg
- Subdivisions: 14 Gemeindeteile

Government
  - Mayor (2020–26): Bernd Bogner (FW)

Area
  - Total: 42.59 km^{2} (16.44 sq mi)
- Elevation: 353 m (1,158 ft)

Population (2025-12-31)
  - Total: 3,509
  - Density: 82.39/km^{2} (213.4/sq mi)
- Time zone: UTC+01:00 (CET)
  - Summer (DST): UTC+02:00 (CEST)
- Postal codes: 91230
- Dialling codes: 09151
- Vehicle registration: LAU, ESB, HEB, N, PEG
- Website: www.happurg.de

Happurg is a municipality in the district of Nürnberger Land in Bavaria in Germany. During World War II, a subcamp of Flossenbürg concentration camp was located here.

== Geography ==
=== Neighboring municipalities ===
Neighboring municipalities and communities (to the north going clockwise) are: Pommelsbrunn, Alfeld, Lauterhofen, Offenhausen, Engelthal, and Hersbruck.

=== Geographic location ===
The municipality lies in the eastern part of the Franconian Jura
