= No Boundaries =

No Boundaries may refer to:

== Music ==
=== Albums ===
- No Boundaries (The 5 Browns album)
- No Boundaries (Michael Angelo Batio album)
- No Boundaries (Eva Cassidy album)
- No Boundaries (Sertab Erener album)
- No Boundaries (Ladysmith Black Mambazo album)
- No Boundaries (Natalie MacMaster album)
- No Boundaries (Alexander Rybak album)
- No Boundaries: A Benefit for the Kosovar Refugees, an album

== Other ==
- "No Boundaries" (song), the American Idol season 8 winner's song, recorded by Kris Allen and by Adam Lambert
- No Boundaries (contest), a national competition sponsored by USA Today and NASA
- No Boundaries (TV series), a short-lived reality team building competition series that aired on The WB from March 3 until March 24, 2002, later moved to OLN from September 30 until May 8, 2002

== See also ==
- No Boundaries International
