= The Gargoyle =

The Gargoyle may refer to:

- One of three student newspapers:
  - The Gargoyle (newspaper), University College, University of Toronto
  - Gargoyle Humor Magazine, University of Michigan
  - Flagler College Gargoyle, Flagler College
- The Gargoyle (novel), by Andrew Davidson.
- The Gargoyle, a children's novel by Garry Kilworth

== See also ==
Gargoyle (disambiguation)
