= Alfeld (disambiguation) =

Alfeld is a town in Lower Saxony, Germany.

Alfeld may also refer to:

- Alfeld, Bavaria, a municipality in Nürnberger Land, Bavaria, Germany

== People with the surname ==
- Robin Alfeld (born 1956), New Zealand rugby league player
