= Op. 29 =

In music, Op. 29 stands for Opus number 29. Compositions that are assigned this number include:

- Beethoven – String Quintet, Op. 29
- Chopin – Impromptu No. 1
- Enescu – Piano Quintet
- Finzi – Intimations of Immortality
- Hindemith – Klaviermusik mit Orchester
- Holst – St Paul's Suite
- Liebermann – Gargoyles
- Madetoja – Symphony No. 1 in F major (1916)
- Nielsen – Symphony No. 4
- Prokofiev – Piano Sonata No. 4
- Rachmaninoff – Isle of the Dead
- Ries – Clarinet Sonata
- Saint-Saëns – Piano Concerto No. 3
- Schubert – String Quartet No. 13
- Schumann – 3 Gedichte
- Scriabin – Symphony No. 2
- Shostakovich – Lady Macbeth of the Mtsensk District
- Sibelius – Snöfrid, melodrama for narrator, mixed choir, and orchestra (1900)
- Strauss – Traum durch die Dämmerung
- Suk – A Summer's Tale
- Szymanowski – Métopes
- Tchaikovsky – Symphony No. 3
- Waterhouse – Mouvements d'Harmonie
