= Hieronymus Wilhelm Ebner von Eschenbach =

Nuremberg diplomat and historian

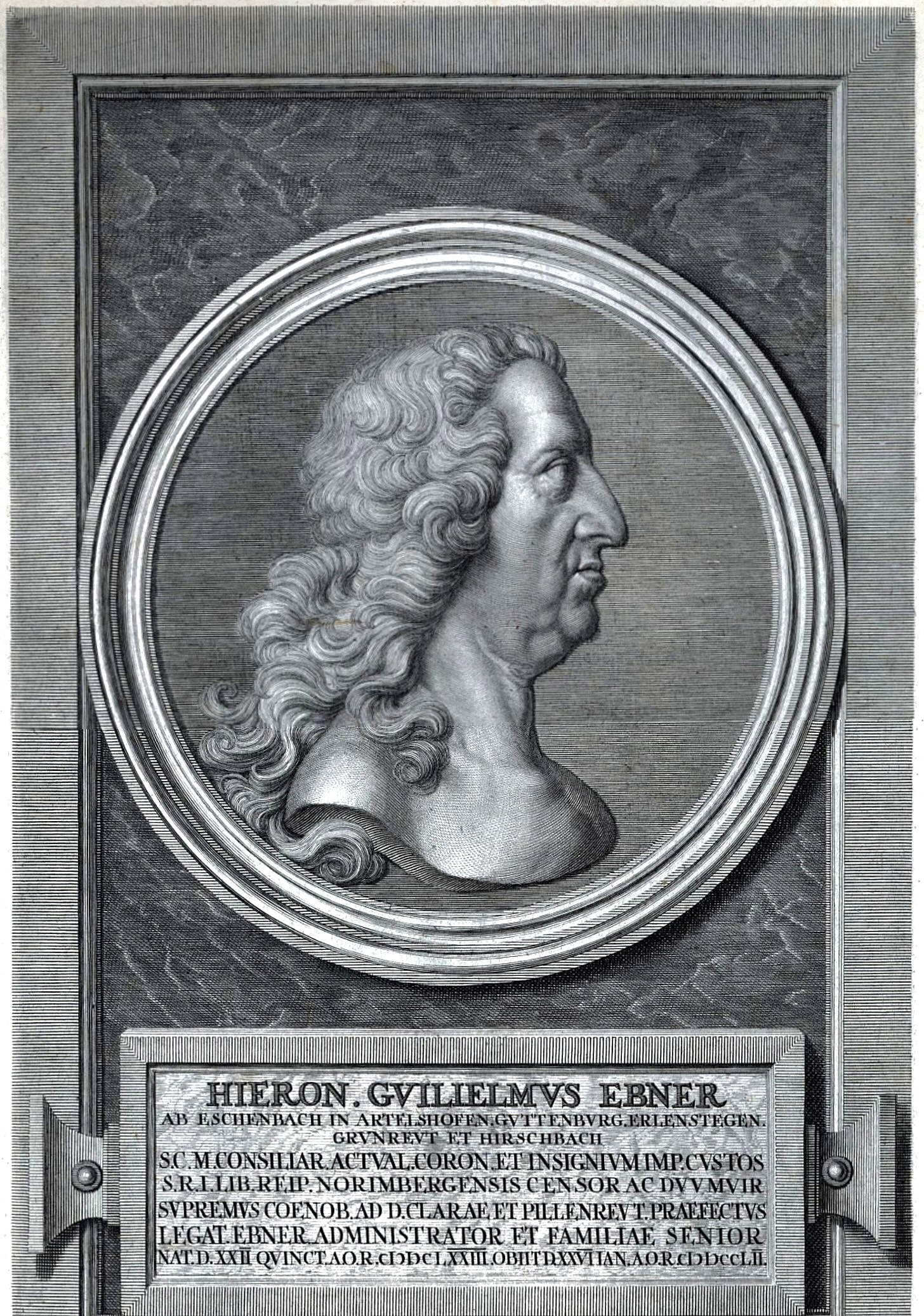
- Portrait engraved by Johann Wilhelm Windter
- Born: 22 June 1673; Nuremberg, Holy Roman Empire
- Died: 26 January 1752 (aged 78); Engelthal, Holy Roman Empire
- Other name: Hieronymus Guilielmus Ebner ab Eschenbach (Latinised)
- Occupations: Diplomat; scholar; historian; librarian
- Known for: Bibliotheca Ebneriana

Academic background
- Education: Altdorf University

Signature
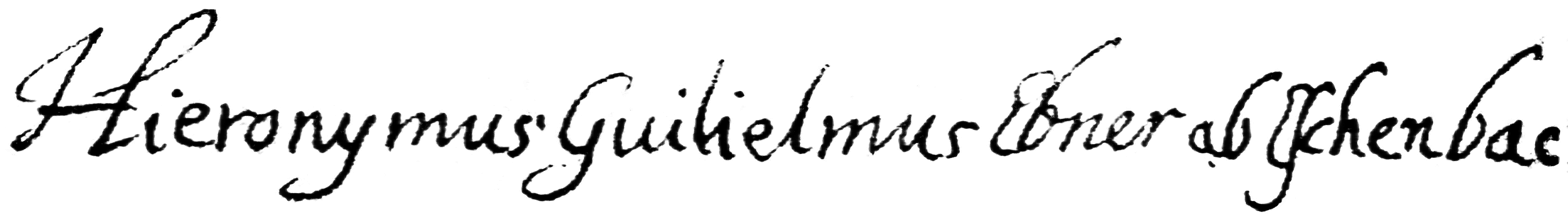

Hieronymus Wilhelm Ebner von Eschenbach (born 22 June 1673, Nuremberg; died 26 January 1752, Engelthal) was a German diplomat, historian, scholar, and founder of the extensive private library Bibliotheca Ebneriana.

== Family ==
The Ebners were one of the oldest patrician families of the imperial city of Nuremberg, first mentioned in a document in 1234. They held seats in the city council since the 14th century and named themselves Eschenbach in the 16th–17th century.

== Career ==
After completing his studies at the University of Altdorf, Ebner embarked on a four-year educational journey across Europe in 1691, visiting the Netherlands, Italy, Austria, Bohemia, and northern Germany. Returning to Nuremberg in 1700, he began preparing for a political career, holding various positions before being appointed to the city council in 1708. In 1718, he assumed the role of Scholarchat, overseeing the schools of the imperial city, a position he held until 1744. Ebner contributed to the cataloging of Nuremberg's public library and imperial city archives, publishing selected documents he deemed of particular significance.

Bibliotheca Ebneriana was built on many smaller collections he had acquired, such as the private library of his uncle Christoph Jacob Imhoff, which he had inherited in 1726. Gottfried Christoph Ranner's five-volume catalogue of Bibliotheca Ebneriana, published in the early-19th century, lists 18,512 titles divided into 11 sections, showing the extensive range and eclectic nature of the collection: encyclopedias; books on the history of Nuremberg, of the Holy Roman Empire, and of Europe; books on Christianity, geography, war history, and fine arts; and literature of Greece and Rome in antiquity, to name a few.

== Legacy ==
After Ebner's death, Wahre Abbildung der sämtlichen Reichskleinodien (transl. 'True Image of All Imperial Regalia'), a work on the imperial treasury with engravings by Johann Adam Delsenbach, was published in 1790 under his patronage. The Codex Ebnerianus, a Greek-language illuminated manuscript of the New Testament that is estimated to have been written around 1110, is named after him.
