= Gargoyle (disambiguation) =

A gargoyle is a grotesque statue.

Gargoyle may also refer to:

- Gargoyle (monster), a type of fantasy and horror monster

== Books and publications ==
- Gargoyles (novel), a 1967 novel by Thomas Bernhard
- The Gargoyle (novel), a 2008 novel by Andrew Davidson
- The Gargoyle (newspaper), a University of Toronto newspaper
- Gargoyle Humor Magazine, a University of Michigan magazine
- Gargoyle Magazine, a Washington (D.C.) literary journal
- Gargoyles (comics), a 2006 comic book series from Slave Labor Graphics
- Gargoyle (comics), a Marvel Comics character

== Film and television ==
- Gargoyle, a character in the anime series Nadia: The Secret of Blue Water
- Gargoyles (TV series), an animated series that ran from 1994 to 1997
- Gargoyles (film), a 1972 TV film directed by Bill Norton
- Gargoyle: Wings of Darkness, a 2004 horror film

== Games ==
- Gargoyle (module), a Dungeons & Dragons module
- Gargoyles (video game), a 1995 video game
- Gargoyle Games, a British software company successful in the 1980s
- Gargoyle (Champions character) a superhero in the Champions role-playing game and some spin-off League of Champions comics

== Music ==
- Gargoyle (band), a Japanese thrash metal band
- Gargoyle (album), a 2017 album by American singer Mark Lanegan
- Gargoyles (Liebermann), a 1989 suite for solo piano
- "The Gargoyle", a song by Paul Gilbert from the 2008 album Silence Followed by a Deafening Roar
- "Gargoyle", a song by The ILYs from the 2017 album Bodyguard
- "Gargoyle", song by Dinosaur Jr. from the 2010 album Download to Donate for Haiti

== Other uses ==
- LBD Gargoyle, a World War Two guided bomb
- Gargoyle, the NATO reporting name for the S-300PMU-1/2 (SA-20) anti-aircraft missile system
- Gargoyle (router firmware), an OpenWrt-based router firmware
- The Gargoyles, two mountain peaks in British Columbia, Canada
- Formerly someone with Hurler syndrome, once known as "Gargoylism"
- Greensboro Gargoyles, a professional ice hockey team
- Gargoyles Eyewear, a sunglasses brand

== See also ==
- Gargouille, a dragon
