= Wilhelm Facklam =

German painter (1893–1972)

- Born: 16 April 1893; Upahl (Grevesmühlen), Mecklenburg, Germany
- Died: 21 September 1972 (aged 79); Winkelhaid (Nuremberg), Bavaria, West Germany
- Occupation: landscape artist

Wilhelm Facklam (16 April 1893 – 21 September 1972) was a German landscape artist and draftsman. The focus of his work was on the countryside of his home region, Mecklenburg. He is one of the most important landscape artists in the tradition of the Schwaan Artistic Colony.

== Life ==
Facklam was born in Upahl, a village near Grevesmühlen in Mecklenburg. His father was a farmer, and after leaving secondary school in 1908 Facklam also worked in the agricultural sector for several years. He received his first artistic training only in 1914, from the landscape artist Ludwig Dettmann in Schwerin. Artistic training was interrupted by the outbreak of war at the end of July 1914 and four years of military service. However, from 1919/20, on the recommendation of Carl Malchin (1838-1923), he pursued his studies with Franz Bunke in Schwaan, also spending time at the Arts Academy in Weimar where he remained till 1923. This was the year in which he settled to a career as a freelance artist in Schwerin.

In 1930, together with his friend and fellow artist Richard Zscheked (1885-1954) he established an art school at Schwerin. One of their better known pupils was Carl Hinrichs (artist) (1903-1990) who received his first artistic education at the school. War returned in 1939, and from then till 1945 Facklam served initially as a soldier and subsequently as a prisoner of war, returning to Schwerin in 1946.

In 1963, now aged 70, he was able to relocate on health grounds, moving to Winkelhaid on the edge of Nuremberg.

Facklam was a member of the German National League of Visual artists until the organisation was abolished directly following a change of government early in 1933. He was a member of the "Mecklenburg Artists' League", the "Union of Schwerin Artists" and of the "Artists Collective of Nuremberg".

== Works (selection) ==
- "Blick auf Crivitz" (View of Crivitz)
- "Blick auf Schwerin"
- "Im Wismarer Hafen" (In Wismar harbour)
- "Blick auf Schwaan" (1920)
- "Landschaft bei Schwaan" (1922) (Landscape near Schwaan)
- "Grauer Wintertag“ (1923) (Grey winter day)
- "Weiden im Kornfeld“ (1924) (Grazing in the corn field)
- "Katen in Upahl" (1926) (Cottages in Upahl)
- "Morgenstimmung an der Warnow" (1927) (Morning atmosphere on the (River) Warnow)
- "Kartoffelernte“ (ca 1930) (Potato harvest)
- "Windmühle“ (1930) (Windmill)
- "Schäfer mit Schafen“ (1937/38) (Shephard with sheep)
- "Baumgruppe im Herbst“ (1940) (Group of trees in Autumn)
- "Bauernhof“ (1941) (Farmhouse)
- "Alt-Mecklenburg" (1957)
