= Rückersdorf =

Rückersdorf could be any one of the following places:

- Germany:
  - Rückersdorf, Thuringia
  - Rückersdorf, Bavaria, a town in the district of Nürnberger Land in Bavaria
  - Rückersdorf, Brandenburg
- Austria:
  - Rückersdorf, Lower Austria
  - Rückersdorf, Carinthia
- Switzerland:
  - Rückersdorf, Switzerland
