= Velden =

Velden may refer to several places:

- Velden am Wörther See, a municipality on lake Wörthersee in Carinthia, Austria
- Velden, Limburg, a village in the municipality of Venlo, Netherlands
- Velden (Pegnitz), a town in the district of Nürnberger Land in Bavaria, Germany
- Velden (Vils), a municipality in the district of Landshut in southeastern Bavaria, Germany
