= Nürnberger Land =

Coordinates: 49°30′N 11°22′E

- District
- Flag Coat of arms
- Country: Germany
- State: Bavaria
- Adm. region: Middle Franconia
- Capital: Lauf an der Pegnitz

Government
  - District admin.: Armin Kroder (FW)

Area
  - Total: 800 km^{2} (310 sq mi)

Population (31 December 2025)
  - Total: 168,282
  - Density: 210/km^{2} (540/sq mi)
- Time zone: UTC+01:00 (CET)
  - Summer (DST): UTC+02:00 (CEST)
- Vehicle registration: LAU, ESB, HEB, N, PEG
- Website: nuernberger-land.de

Nürnberger Land is a Landkreis (district) in Bavaria, Germany. It is bounded by (from the north and clockwise) the districts of Forchheim, Bayreuth, Amberg-Sulzbach, Neumarkt, Roth and Erlangen-Höchstadt, and by the city of Nuremberg.

== History ==
The district was established in 1972 by merging the former districts of Nuremberg, Hersbruck and Lauf, reuniting for the first time since 1789 most of the former lands of the Imperial City of Nuremberg.

== Geography ==
The district includes the eastern metropolitan area of Nuremberg in the west and the hills of the Frankish Alb in the east. The Pegnitz River runs through the district, coming from the northeast and leaving to the west towards Nuremberg.

== Coat of arms ==
The upper part of the coat of arms is identical to the city arms of Nuremberg. In the bottom part there is a water wheel representing the watermills on the river Pegnitz.

== Towns and municipalities ==
Clickable map of towns and municipalities in the district

Towns
Märkte
Municipalities
1. Altdorf bei Nürnberg
2. Hersbruck
3. Lauf an der Pegnitz
4. Röthenbach an der Pegnitz
1. Feucht
2. Neuhaus an der Pegnitz
3. Schnaittach
1. Burgthann
2. Kirchensittenbach
3. Leinburg
4. Neunkirchen am Sand
5. Ottensoos
6. Pommelsbrunn
7. Reichenschwand
8. Rückersdorf
9. Schwaig
10. Schwarzenbruck
11. Simmelsdorf
12. Winkelhaid

Verwaltungsgemeinschaften
1. Happurg; 1. Alfeld; 2. Happurg^{1}	2. Henfenfeld; 1. Engelthal; 2. Henfenfeld^{1}; 3. Offenhausen	3. Velden; 1. Hartenstein; 2. Velden^{1,2}; 3. Vorra
^{1}seat of the Verwaltungsgemeinschaft; ^{2}town
