= Winkelhaid =

- Municipality
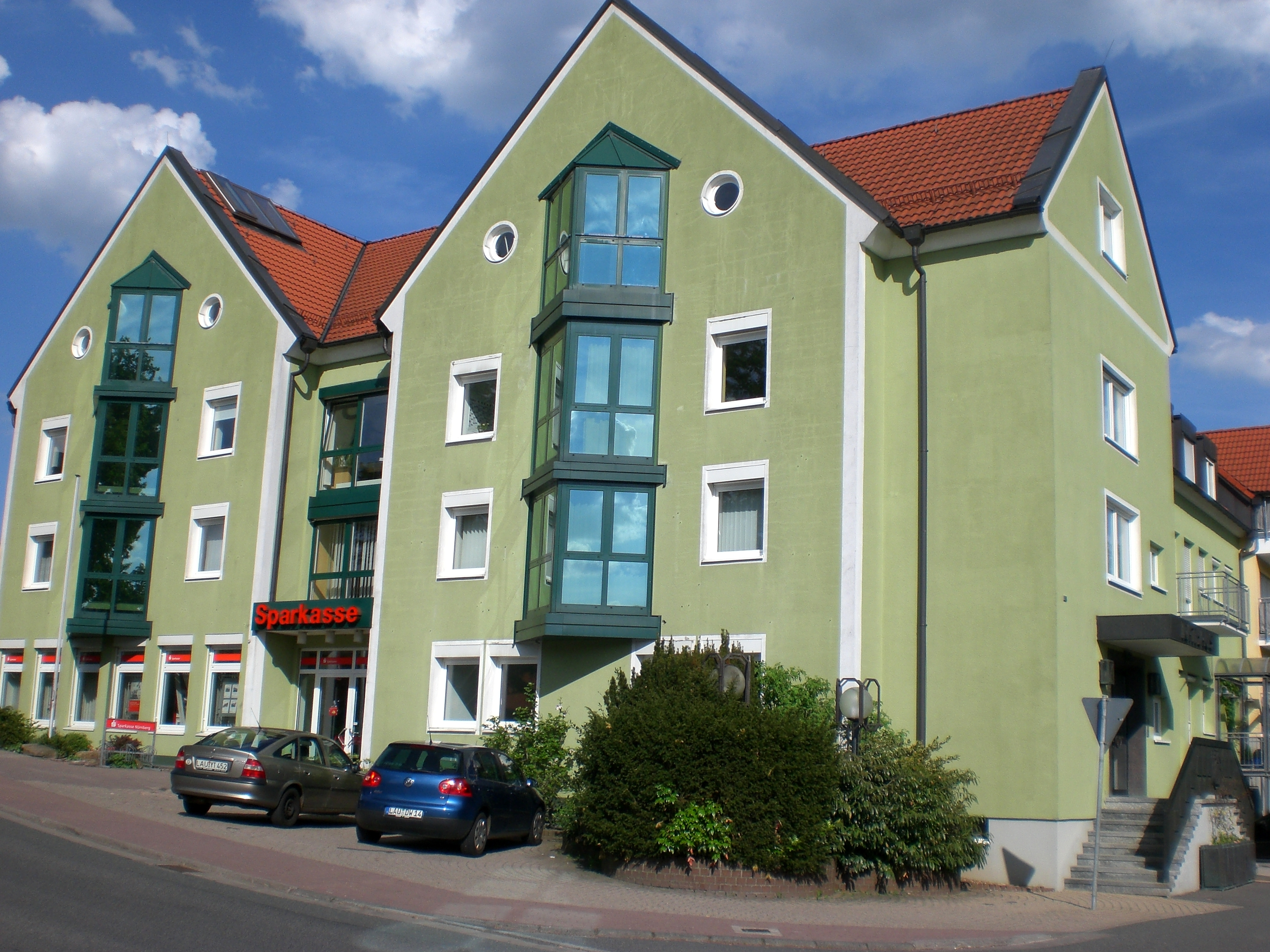
- Town hall

- Coat of arms

- Location of Winkelhaid within Nürnberger Land district
- Interactive map of Winkelhaid
- Location within Germany Location within Bavaria
- Coordinates: 49°23′N 11°18′E
- Country: Germany
- State: Bavaria
- Admin. region: Mittelfranken
- District: Nürnberger Land
- Subdivisions: 4 Ortsteile

Government
  - Mayor (2020–26): Michael Schmidt (CSU)

Area
  - Total: 6.45 km^{2} (2.49 sq mi)
- Elevation: 427 m (1,401 ft)

Population (2025-12-31)
  - Total: 4,178
  - Density: 648/km^{2} (1,680/sq mi)
- Time zone: UTC+01:00 (CET)
  - Summer (DST): UTC+02:00 (CEST)
- Postal codes: 90610
- Dialling codes: 09187
- Vehicle registration: LAU, ESB, HEB, N, PEG
- Website: www.winkelhaid.de

Winkelhaid (German pronunciation: [ˈvɪŋkl̩haɪt]) is a municipality in the district of Nürnberger Land in Bavaria in Germany. It is situated 18 km southeast of Nuremberg in the administrative region of Middle Franconia. Winkelhaid is bounded by (from the north and clockwise) the municipalities of Altdorf bei Nürnberg, Schwarzenbruck and Feucht.

== History ==
=== Prehistory ===
Around 10 prehistoric sites demonstrate the progress in prehistoric research over the last 30 years. The oldest evidence of settlement is a site east of Penzenhofen, which indicates immigrants from southeastern Bavaria in the Middle Neolithic period, in the first half of the 5th millennium BC. From the Bronze Age until the turn of the millennium, the Winkelhaid area appears to have been repeatedly settled by humans, but the few excavated remains allow only cautious conclusions. There were probably two smaller settlements under the late Celts before traces disappeared for centuries.

=== Early Middle Ages ===
The least known district of Richthausen is possibly the oldest: The village of "Riuthusen" was probably founded as early as the 9th century during the reign of the descendants of Emperor Charlemagne. In the 12th century, a pottery workshop was added to the eastern edge of the village (today the location of the REWE supermarket), which probably existed until the early modern period.

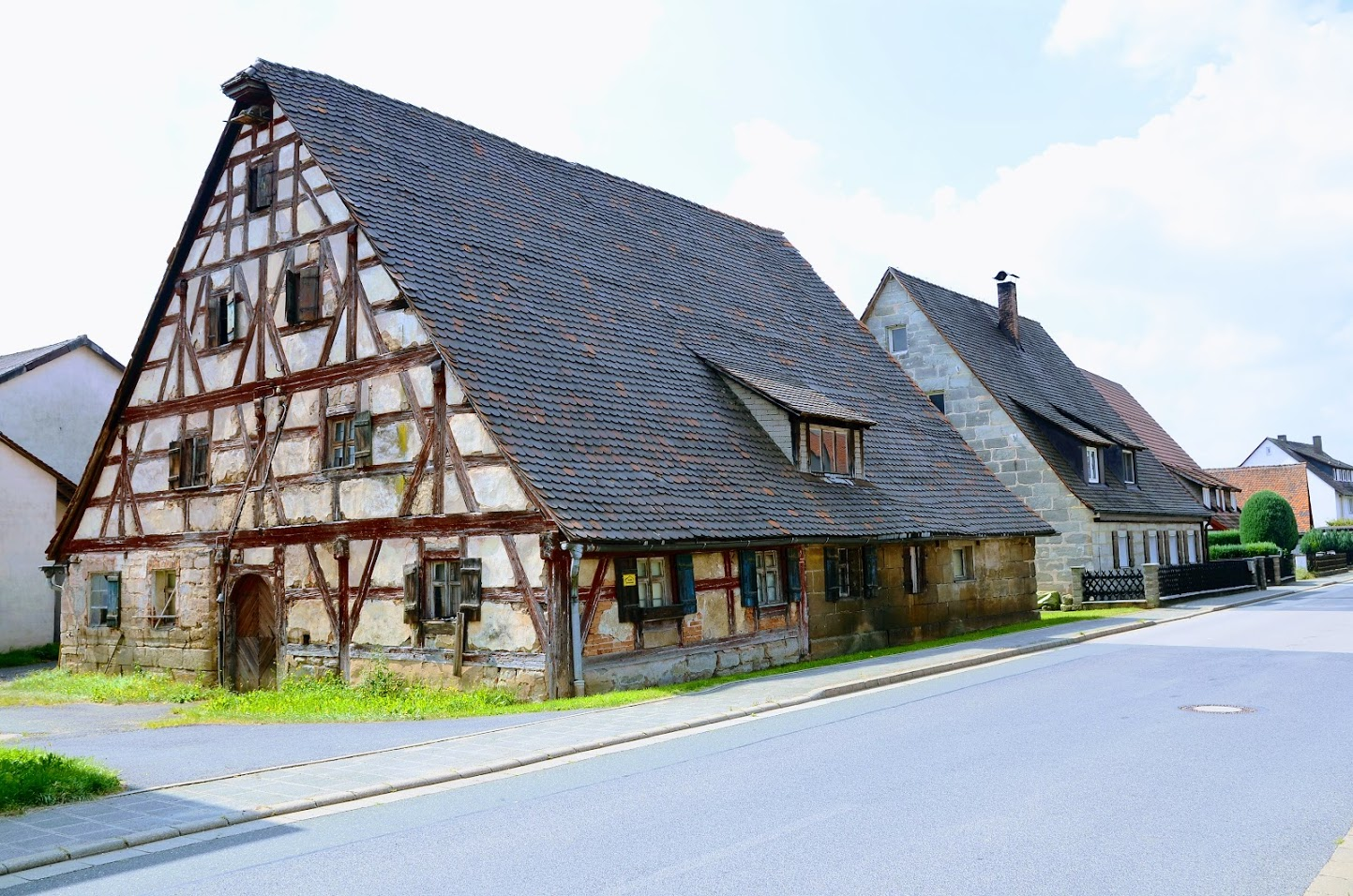
Richthausen – historic farmhouses and half-timbered houses along Richthausener Straße (2017)

From the beginning, the church village of Penzenhofen, located on the important Feucht-Altdorf road, was likely the most important part of Winkelhaid. It first appears in an Eichstätt document in 1129 and was the seat of the imperial servants Turinhart and Hartmann von Penzenhofen.

Archaeological finds attest to the first settlement activities in the municipality dating back to the period between 1040 and 1050 AD. The first documented mention of Winkelhaid dates back to 1274.

=== The Late Middle Ages ===
The villages of Winkelhaid and Richthausen belonged to the royal estate of Altdorf and were sold with it in 1360 by the Counts of Nassau to the Burgraves of Nuremberg. In 1393, they passed from the Duke of Pomerania to the Electoral Palatine, who, although it held the village and state lordship, by no means all the farms here. By 1499, Nuremberg citizens and monasteries already owned seven estates in Ungelstetten and four in Penzenhofen under Palatine sovereignty in the Ludersheim administration.

=== The Modern Era ===
The War of the Landshut Succession in 1504 brought about a major change, in which the Imperial City of Nuremberg conquered and retained the neighboring Electoral Palatinate Amt of Altdorf. From then on, all Winkelhaid districts, along with their essential rights, belonged to the newly created Nuremberg region. By the beginning of the 16th century, 50 properties were already documented in Winkelhaid. By the end of the 18th century, the town had a population of approximately 380. The opening of the Nuremberg-Feucht-Winkelhaid-Altdorf railway line (1878) brought new opportunities, as many Winkelhaid residents found jobs in Nuremberg.

In the course of the administrative reform in Bavaria, the main town of Penzenhofen was incorporated into the dissolved municipality of the same name on 1 January 1972.

== Municipal Subdivisions ==
- Penzenhofen
- Richthausen
- Ungelstetten
- Winkelhaid

== Climate ==
Winkelhaid has an oceanic climate (Koppen: Cfb), influenced by its inland position and higher altitude causing seasonal differences reminiscent of continental climates, although its winters are somewhat milder. The average annual temperature is 8.2 °C with an average yearly precipitation of 693 millimeters. The average temperature in January is −1.3 °C and in July 17.5 °C. The driest month is February with precipitation of around 41 mm. The wettest month is June, with 81 mm per month.
