= No Boundaries (The 5 Browns album) =

Studio album by The 5 Browns
- Released: April 4, 2006
- Recorded: High Resolution 24 bit 88.2 kHz technology
- Genre: Classical
- Length: 61:31
- Label: RCA Red Seal
- Producer: Jay David Saks, Joel Diamond

Professional ratings
Review scores
Source	Rating
hometheaterinfo.com	B+

No Boundaries is the second album from the classical piano group The 5 Browns.

== Critical reception ==
James Manheim of AllMusic writes, "U.S. marketers have been looking for a crossover blockbuster to match Britain's parade of chart-topping teens, and they may just have found one in this quintet of well-scrubbed Utah siblings (three girls, two boys) who won separate scholarships to the Juilliard School in New York. The best news is that the playing here is musically solid and the repertoire even a bit challenging"

Jed Distler of ClassicToday says, "These five brothers and sisters really can play!" and concludes his review with, "In all, this is an enjoyable disc, with something for everyone. But if the Browns seriously want to cultivate a 'No Boundaries' image, perhaps a programming and repertoire consultant can take them to the next level."

== Track listing ==
No.	Title	Writer(s)	Performers	Length
1.	"Rhapsody in Blue" (arranged for 5 piano)	George Gershwin	The 5 Browns	9:46
2.	"Malaguena from Andalucia Suite"	Ernesto Lecuona	Gregory and Ryan Brown	3:30
3.	"Simple Gifts/Going Home"	arranged by Aaron Copland/Anton Dvorak	The 5 Browns	3:04
4.	"Full Stride Ahead (Rag)"	John Novacek	Gregory Brown	1:32
5.	"Feria from Rapsodie Espagnole"	Maurice Ravel	Desirae and Deondra Brown	6:06
6.	"Gargoyles, Op. 29; III. Allegro Moderato"	Lowell Liebermann	Melody Brown	2:09
7.	"Gargoyles, Op. 29; IV. Presto Feroce"	Lowell Liebermann	Melody Brown	2:40
8.	"Hungarian Rhapsody No. 6"	Franz Liszt	Gregory Brown	7:12
9.	"Variations on a Theme of Paganini"	Witold Lutoslawski	Deondra and Desirae Brown	5:06
10.	"Danzas Argentinas, Op. 2; I. Danza del Viejo Boyero (Dance of the Old C)"	Alberto Ginastera	Ryan Brown	1:12
11.	"Danzas Argentinas, Op. 2; II. Danza de la Mozo Donosa (Dance of the Del)"	Alberto Ginastera	Ryan Brown	2:48
12.	"Danzas Argentinas, Op. 2; III. Danza del Gaucho Matrero (Dance of the A)"	Alberto Ginastera	Ryan Brown	2:56
13.	"Valse and Romance; Valse"	Sergei Rachmaninoff	Desirae, Deondra, and Melody Brown	1:20
14.	"Valse and Romance; Romance"	Sergei Rachmanioff	Desirae, Deondra, and Melody Brown	3:30
15.	"Firebird" (arranged for 5 piano)	Igor Stravinsky	The 5 Browns	8:40
Total length:				61:31
