= The 5 Browns =

Classical piano ensemble consisting of five siblings

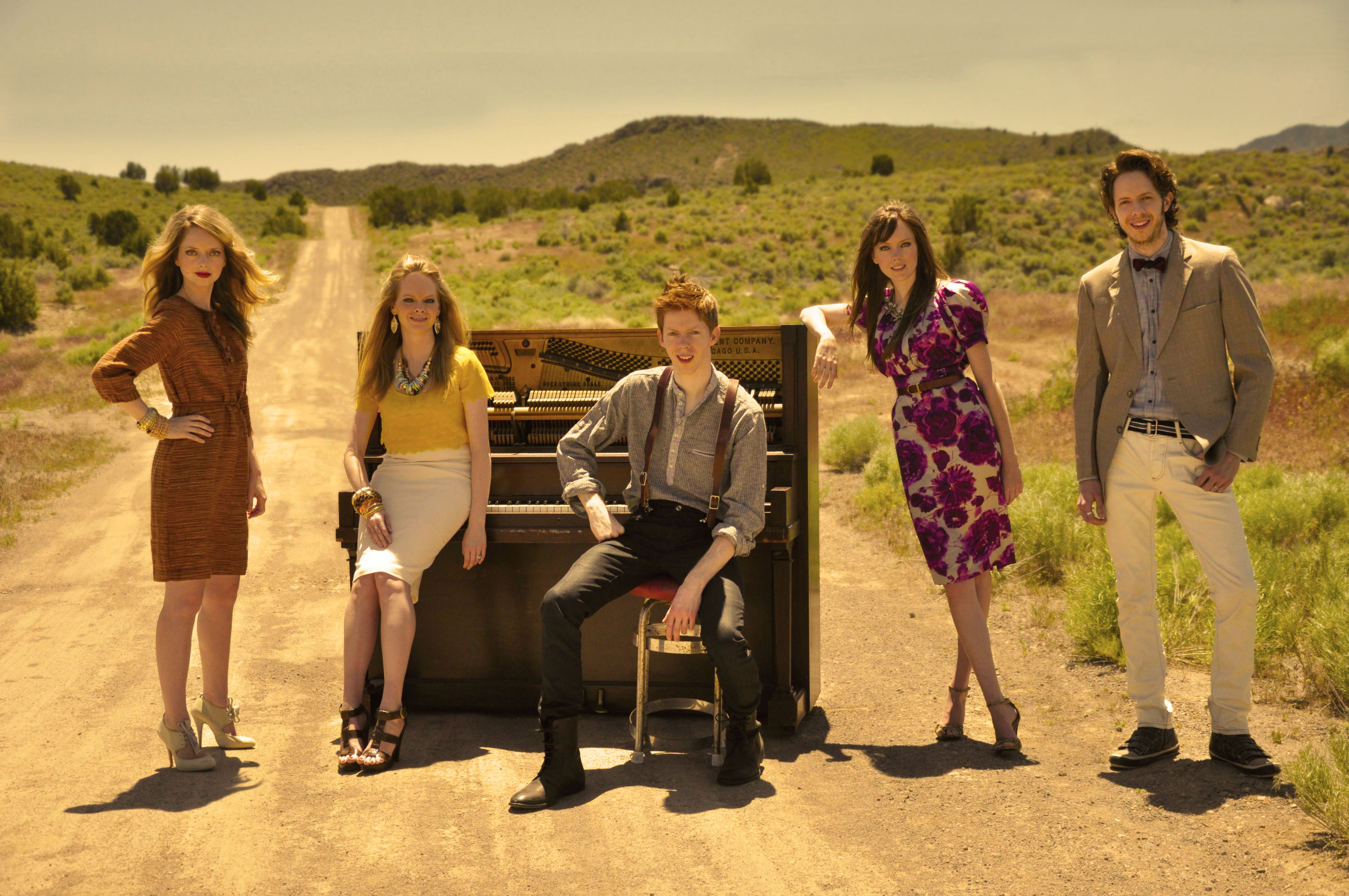
- Desirae, Deondra, Ryan, Melody, Gregory of The 5 Browns

Background information
- Origin: Alpine, Utah, United States
- Genres: Classical
- Years active: 2004–present
- Labels: RCA Red Seal, Sony Masterworks, E1 Music
- Members: Desirae Brown; Deondra Brown; Gregory Brown; Melody Brown; Ryan Brown
- Website: the5browns.com

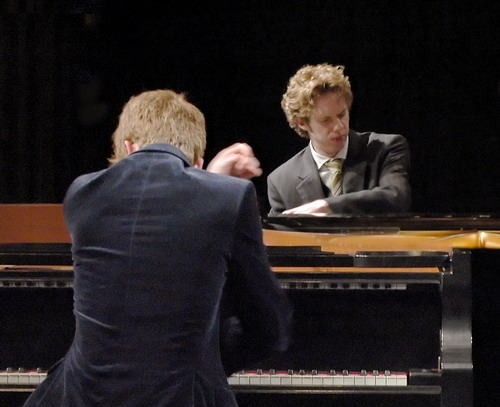
The 5 Browns brothers perform at the Ottawa Chamber Music Festival Piano Gala

The 5 Browns are an American musical ensemble who perform classical piano pieces, consisting of five siblings—two brothers and three sisters.

Their repertoire ranges from concert hall staples, such as Igor Stravinsky's The Rite of Spring, Gershwin's Rhapsody in Blue, and Grieg's In the Hall of the Mountain King to lesser known works like Nico Muhly's Edge of the World and John Novacek's Reflections on Shenandoah. In addition to their work on five pianos, The 5 Browns perform and record works for solo piano, two pianos, and in various other combinations.

== Background ==
The Browns are the children of Keith and Lisa Brown. In descending age order, the Browns are Desirae (born 1979), Deondra (born 1980), Gregory (born 1982), Melody (born 1984), and Ryan (born 1986). All five siblings were born in Houston, Texas, where each began piano study with Yelena Kurinets at age 3. In 1991, the family moved to Utah and the children were homeschooled and they continued private piano study with Irene Peery-Fox.

From 2001 to 2006 the Browns attended New York's Juilliard School, where they studied with Yoheved Kaplinsky. They were the first family of five siblings to be enrolled simultaneously at Juilliard. In February 2002 People magazine dubbed them the “Fab Five" at about the same time they were featured on Oprah and 60 Minutes. The 5 Browns have released 3 CDs that each went to #1 on Billboard Magazine's Classical Album Chart. Their concerts have widely received critical acclaim.

From 2004 to 2008 they were signed with the RCA Red Seal label (later folded into Sony BMG Masterworks), but for their 2010 release, The 5 Browns In Hollywood, they signed with E1 Music. The 5 Browns are Steinway Artists.

A five-piano concerto, Edge of the World by Nico Muhly, was commissioned for performance at the Ravinia Festival by the 5 Browns. The piece premiered in 2011 under the direction of James Conlon with the Chicago Symphony Orchestra. They also performed on the Fall 2009 runway of designer Zac Posen for New York's Mercedes-Benz Fashion week. The Wall Street Journal noted "Mr. Posen placed the five pianos in a line down the middle of the runway, where the 5 Browns pounded away at complex five-piano arrangements. The result was a show that didn't require any expensive backdrops and would have entertained even without the models."

In 2011, Keith Brown, father and former manager of the group, pleaded guilty to the sexual abuse of his three daughters over a period spanning from 1990 to 1998. He was sentenced to 10 years to life on the first count and 15 years to life on the other two counts. In late 2011, Desirae and Deondra Brown formed The Foundation for Survivors of Abuse, a non-profit organization through which they advocate for victims' rights. A documentary on the controversy, The 5 Browns: Digging Through The Darkness, was released in 2018.

The recording of a live concert performance of Igor Stravinsky's The Rite of Spring with producer Adam Abeshouse, was released in October 2013. The 5 Browns were also featured in the Fall 2013 season 2 of the series “Oprah: Where Are They Now?” on OWN: Oprah Winfrey Network.

In 2023, Ryan Brown stopped performing and was succeeded by pianist Stephen Beus.

== Discography ==
- The 5 Browns (RCA Red Seal) 2005
- No Boundaries (RCA Red Seal) 2006
- Browns In Blue (Sony/BMG Masterworks) 2007
- 5 Stars: Favorites From The 5 Browns (Sony Masterworks) 2008
- The 5 Browns in Hollywood (E1 Music) 2010
- The Rite of Spring (October 1, 2013, Steinway and Sons)
- Christmas With The 5 Browns 2019
- The Little Tin Box 2020
