= Henfenfeld =

- Municipality
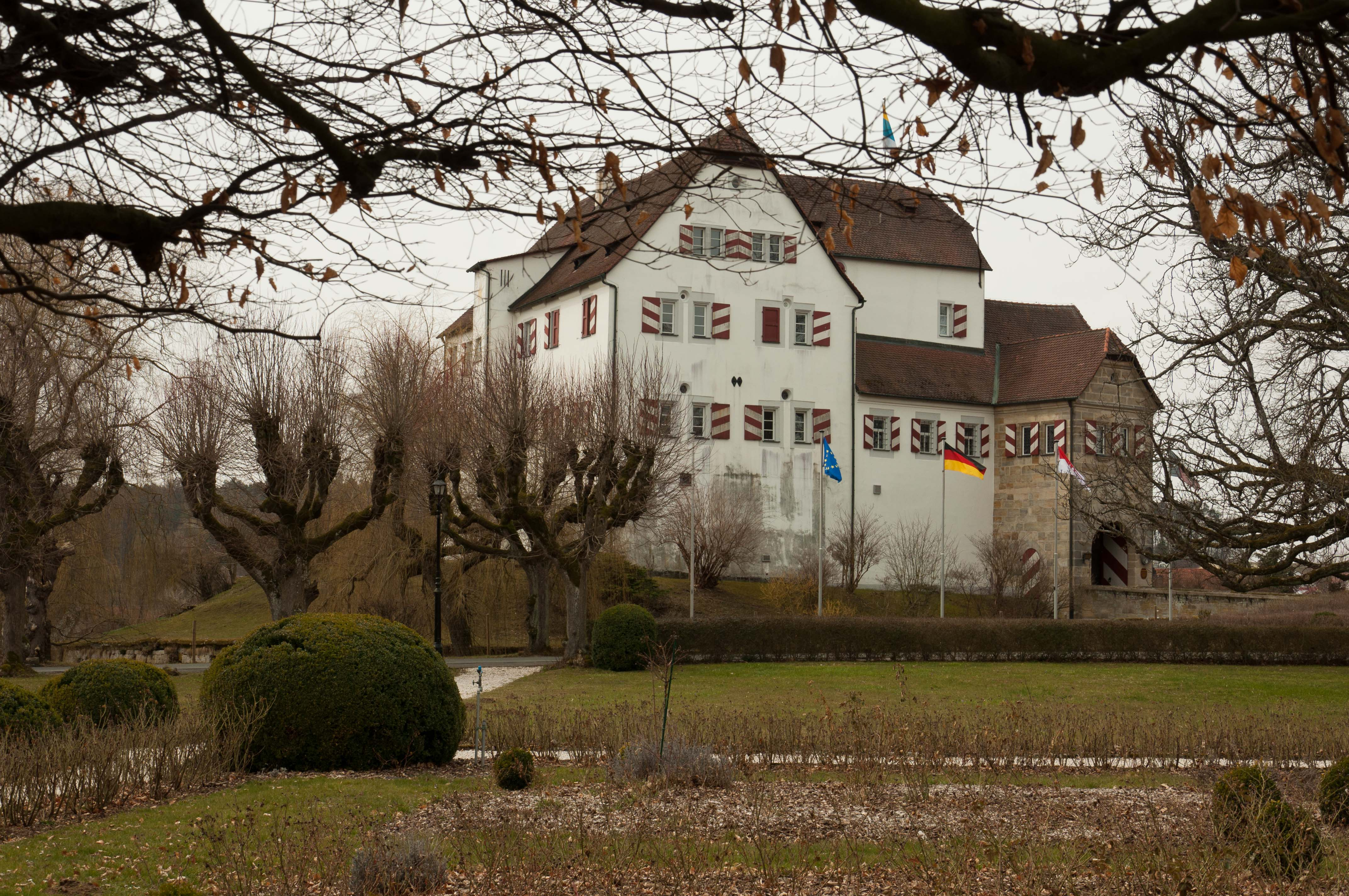
- Henfenfeld Castle

- Coat of arms

- Location of Henfenfeld within Nürnberger Land district
- Interactive map of Henfenfeld
- Location within Germany Location within Bavaria
- Coordinates: 49°30′N 11°23′E
- Country: Germany
- State: Bavaria
- Admin. region: Mittelfranken
- District: Nürnberger Land
- Municipal assoc.: Henfenfeld

Government
  - Mayor (2023–29): Markus Gleißenberg (CSU)

Area
  - Total: 6.64 km^{2} (2.56 sq mi)
- Elevation: 345 m (1,132 ft)

Population (2025-12-31)
  - Total: 1,731
  - Density: 261/km^{2} (675/sq mi)
- Time zone: UTC+01:00 (CET)
  - Summer (DST): UTC+02:00 (CEST)
- Postal codes: 91239
- Dialling codes: 09151
- Vehicle registration: LAU, ESB, HEB, N, PEG
- Website: www.henfenfeld.de

Henfenfeld (German pronunciation: [ˈhɛnfn̩fɛlt]) is a municipality near Nuremberg in the Frankenalb (Frankish Alb) directly south of Hersbruck. The town was first mentioned in a letter dating from 13 April 1059. The town is best known for its castle.
