= Minuscule 501 =

- New Testament manuscript
- Text: Gospels †
- Date: 13th-century
- Script: Greek
- Found: 1834
- Now at: British Library
- Size: 24.2 cm by 19.2 cm
- Type: Byzantine text-type
- Category: V
- Note: full marginalia

Minuscule 501 (in the Gregory-Aland numbering), 588 (in the Scrivener's numbering), ε 324 (in the Soden numbering), is a Greek minuscule manuscript of the New Testament, on parchment. Palaeographically it has been assigned to the 13th-century. The manuscript was adapted for liturgical use. It is lacunose.

== Description ==
The codex contains the text of the four Gospels on 157 parchment leaves (size 24.2 cm by 19.2 cm) with some lacunae (Luke 9:14-17:3; 21:15-24:53; John 1:1-18). Some texts were supplied by a later hand (Matthew 1:1-20; Mark 1:1-16; Luke 1:1-20; John 1:38-4:5).

The text is written in one column per page, 23 lines per page. The text is divided according to the κεφαλαια (chapters), whose numerals are given at the margin, and some τιτλοι (titles of chapters) at the top of the pages. There is also a division according to the smaller Ammonian Sections (in Mark 233 sections - the last in 16:19), (without references to the Eusebian Canons).

The tables of the κεφαλαια (tables of contents) are placed before every Gospel, and lectionary markings at the margin (for liturgical use).

It lacks the Pericope Adulterae (John 7:53-8:11) and phrase εγω ουπω αναβαινω εις την εορτην ταυτην in John 7:8. The Pericope Adulterae was added by a later hand.

== Text ==
The Greek text of the codex is a representative of the Byzantine text-type. Hermann von Soden classified it as a member of the textual family K^{x}. Aland placed it in Category V. According to the Claremont Profile Method it belongs to the textual family K^{x} in Luke 1 and Luke 20. In Luke 10 no profile was made.

== History ==
It is dated by the INTF to the 13th-century.

The manuscript came from Patmos. In 1834 Borrell presented it to his friend, English chaplain in Smyrna, F. V. J. Arundell. Bloomfield bought it in an auction in 1850.

Arundell compares it with Codex Ebnerianus, which it very slightly resembles, being larger and far less elegant.

The manuscript was added to the list of New Testament manuscripts by Scrivener (588) and C. R. Gregory (501). It was examined by Bloomfield, Scrivener, and Gregory (in 1883).

It is currently housed at the British Library (Add MS 18211) in London.

== See also ==
- List of New Testament minuscules
- Biblical manuscript
- Textual criticism
