= Hartenstein, Bavaria =

Hartenstein
- Municipality
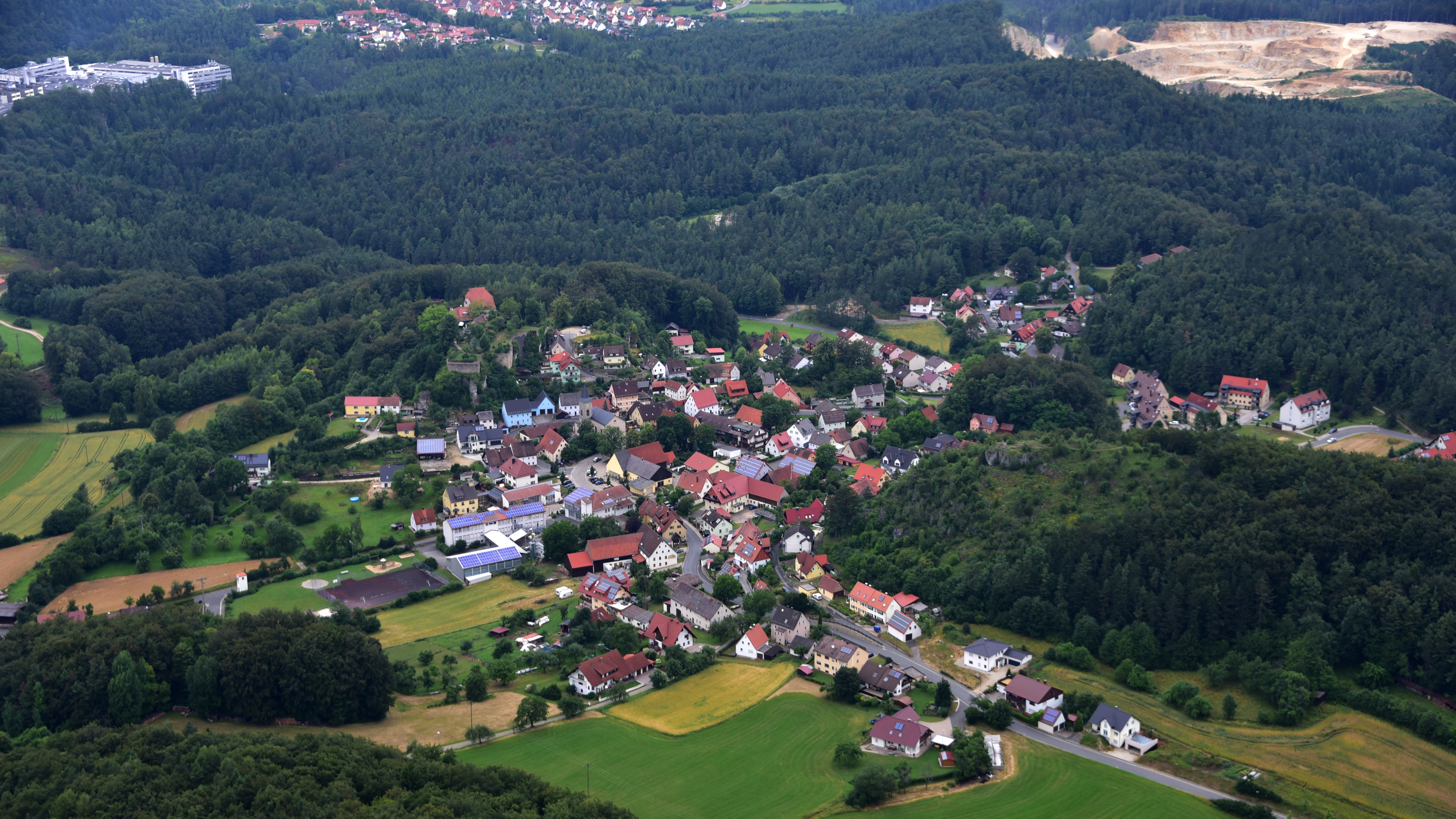
- Aerial view of Hartenstein

- Coat of arms

- Location of Hartenstein within Nürnberger Land district
- Interactive map of Hartenstein
- Location within Germany Location within Bavaria
- Coordinates: 49°35′45″N 11°31′26″E
- Country: Germany
- State: Bavaria
- Admin. region: Mittelfranken
- District: Nürnberger Land
- Municipal assoc.: Velden
- Subdivisions: 15 Ortsteile

Government
  - Mayor (2020–26): Hannes Loos (CSU)

Area
  - Total: 24.76 km^{2} (9.56 sq mi)
- Elevation: 500 m (1,600 ft)

Population (2025-12-31)
  - Total: 1,454
  - Density: 58.72/km^{2} (152.1/sq mi)
- Time zone: UTC+01:00 (CET)
  - Summer (DST): UTC+02:00 (CEST)
- Postal codes: 91235
- Dialling codes: 09152
- Vehicle registration: LAU, ESB, HEB, N, PEG
- Website: www.hartenstein-mfr.de

Hartenstein (German pronunciation: [ˈhaʁtn̩ʃtaɪn]) is a municipality in the district of Nürnberger Land in Bavaria in Germany.
