= Happurg (Verwaltungsgemeinschaft) =

- Verwaltungsgemeinschaft
- Location of Happurg within Nürnberger Land district
- Interactive map of Happurg
- Location within Germany Location within Bavaria
- Coordinates: 49°30′N 11°28′E
- Country: Germany
- State: Bavaria
- Admin. region: Middle Franconia
- District: Nürnberger Land
- Seat: Happurg
- Subdivisions: 2 municipalities

Area
  - Total: 60.52 km^{2} (23.37 sq mi)

Population (2025-12-31)
  - Total: 4,635
  - Density: 76.59/km^{2} (198.4/sq mi)
- Time zone: UTC+01:00 (CET)
  - Summer (DST): UTC+02:00 (CEST)
- Website: www.vg-happurg.de

Happurg is a Verwaltungsgemeinschaft (municipal association) in the district Nürnberger Land in Bavaria, Germany. Its seat is in Happurg.

It consists of the following municipalities:

1. Alfeld
2. Happurg
