= Codex Ebnerianus =

Minuscule 105
- New Testament manuscript
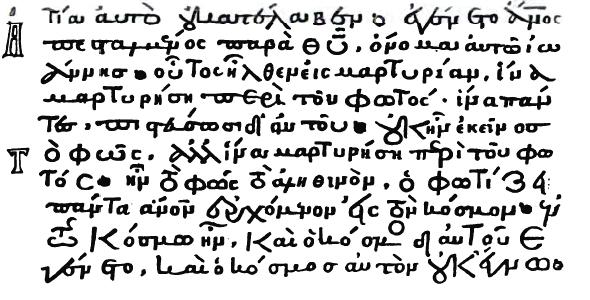
- Gospel of John 1:5-10
- Name: Codex Ebnerianus
- Text: New Testament (except Rev)
- Date: 12th century
- Script: Greek
- Now at: Bodleian Library
- Size: 20.5 by 16 cm
- Type: Byzantine text-type
- Category: V

Codex Ebnerianus, Minuscule 105 (in the Gregory-Aland numbering), δ 257 (Soden), is a Greek language illuminated manuscript of the New Testament, though missing the Book of Revelation.

Formerly it was labeled as 105^{e}, 48^{a}, and 24^{p}.

== Description ==
It is now believed to have been written in Constantinople at the start of the 12th century, during the Comnenian Period. It is unique amongst surviving Greek New Testament manuscripts in that it places author portraits before each epistle, act and gospel, as opposed to just the gospels. This manuscript gives a good example of Greek calligraphy of the 12th century. The manuscript is marked with Georgian quire signatures, but was still in Constantinople in the 16th century.

The text is written in 1 column per page, 27 lines per page, on 426 parchment leaves (20.5 by 16 cm). Capital letters in gold.

The book itself was bound in silver inlaid with ivory and comprises 426 leaves of vellum in quarto (20.5 by 16 cm). It contains Epistula ad Carpianum, the Eusebian Tables, tables of the κεφαλαια, the τιτλοι, numbers of the κεφαλαια at the margin, the Ammonian Sections, but not o references to the Eusebian Canons, subscriptions at the end, στιχοι, and the Nicene Creed all in gold. Synaxarion and Menologion were added by Joasaph, a calligraphist, in 1391, who also added John 8:3-11 at the end of that Gospel.

The Greek text of the codex is a representative of the Byzantine text-type. Aland placed it in Category V. It belongs to the textual family Family K^{x}.

== History ==
The codex is named after Hieronymus Wilhelm Ebner von Eschenbach (1673–1752), a Nuremberg diplomat and German Enlightenment historian, who founded a library using his extensive collection.

Formerly it was labeled as 105^{e}, 48^{a}, and 24^{p}. In 1908 Gregory gave it the number 105.

It is currently housed at the Bodleian Library, Oxford, (MS. Auct. T. inf. 1. 10).

== See also ==
- List of New Testament minuscules
- Textual criticism
- Minuscule 501
