= Burgthann =

- Municipality
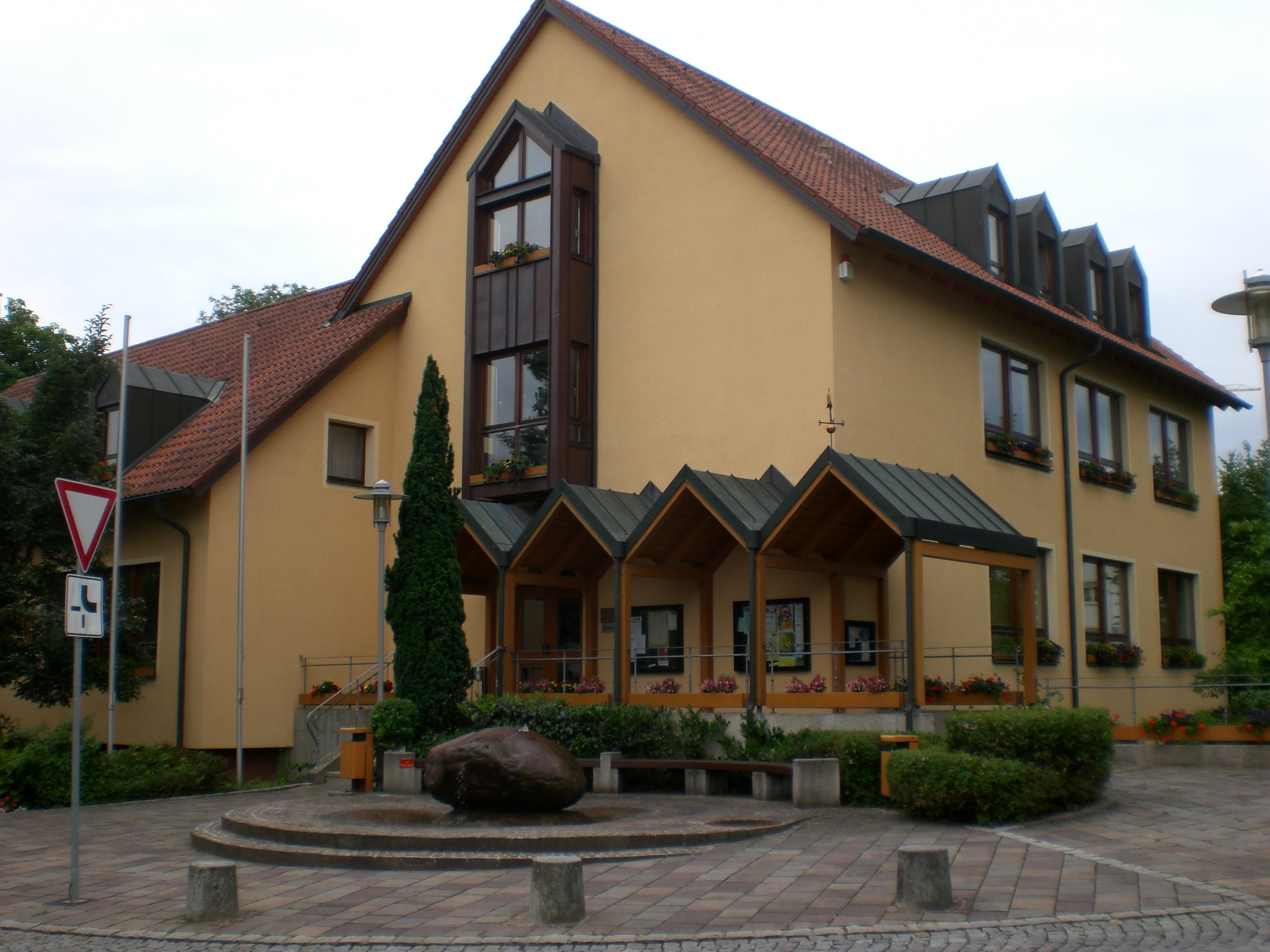
- Town hall

- Coat of arms

- Location of Burgthann within Nürnberger Land district
- Interactive map of Burgthann
- Location within Germany Location within Bavaria
- Coordinates: 49°21′N 11°18′E
- Country: Germany
- State: Bavaria
- Admin. region: Mittelfranken
- District: Nürnberger Land
- Subdivisions: 15 Gemeindeteile

Government
  - Mayor (2020–26): Heinz Meyer (CSU)

Area
  - Total: 39.19 km^{2} (15.13 sq mi)
- Elevation: 400 m (1,300 ft)

Population (2025-12-31)
  - Total: 11,558
  - Density: 294.9/km^{2} (763.8/sq mi)
- Time zone: UTC+01:00 (CET)
  - Summer (DST): UTC+02:00 (CEST)
- Postal codes: 90559
- Dialling codes: 09183 (Ezelsdorf: 09188) (Grub and Großvoggenhof: 09187)
- Vehicle registration: LAU, ESB, HEB, N, PEG
- Website: www.burgthann.de

Burgthann is a municipality in the district Nürnberger Land, in Bavaria, Germany. It is 20 km southeast of Nuremberg (centre).
