= Ottensoos =

- Municipality
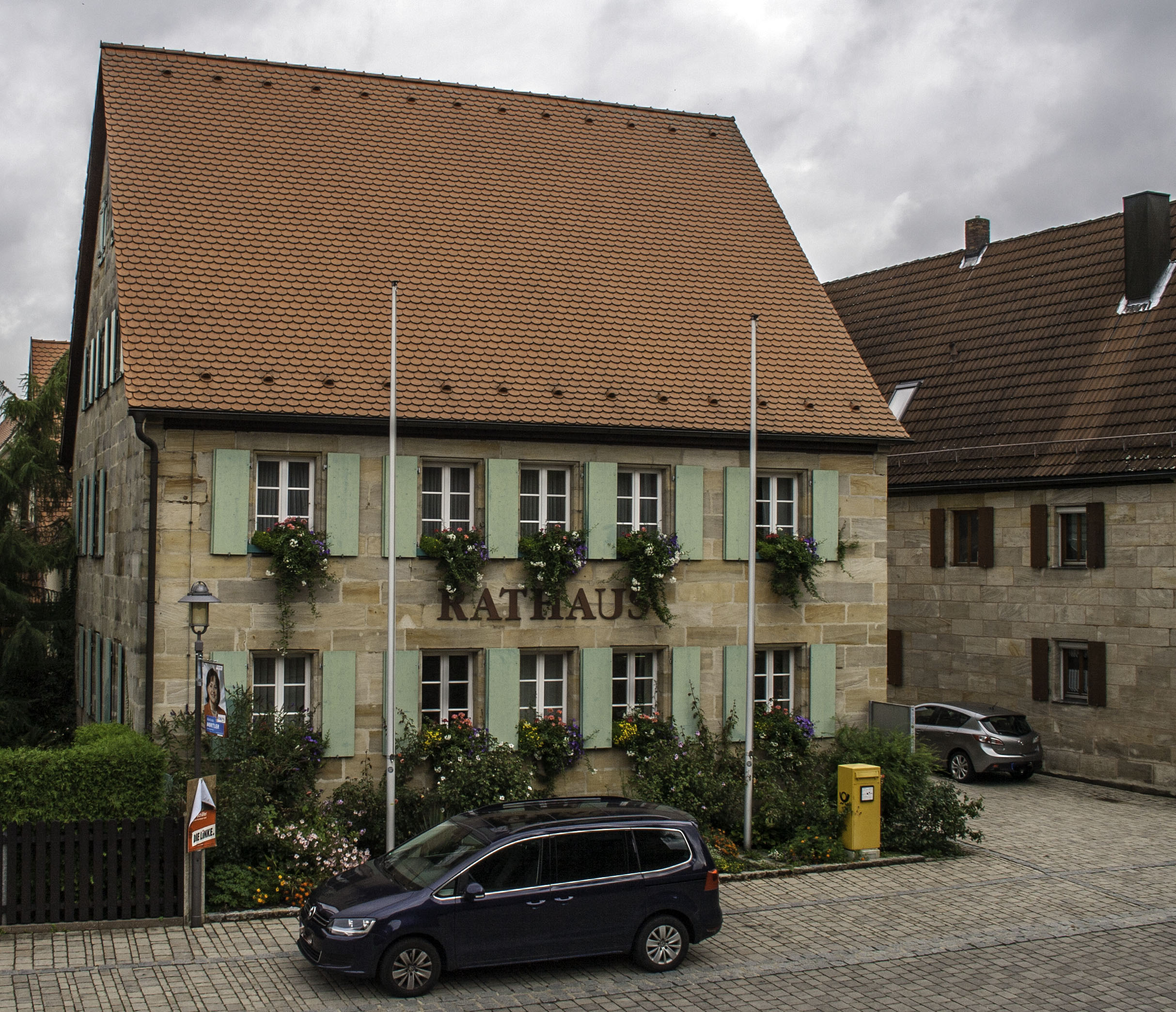
- Town Hall

- Coat of arms

- Location of Ottensoos within Nürnberger Land district
- Interactive map of Ottensoos
- Location within Germany Location within Bavaria
- Coordinates: 49°31′N 11°21′E
- Country: Germany
- State: Bavaria
- Admin. region: Mittelfranken
- District: Nürnberger Land
- Subdivisions: 3 Gemeindeteile

Government
  - Mayor (2020–26): Klaus Falk (CSU)

Area
  - Total: 10.01 km^{2} (3.86 sq mi)
- Elevation: 336 m (1,102 ft)

Population (2025-12-31)
  - Total: 1,909
  - Density: 190.7/km^{2} (493.9/sq mi)
- Time zone: UTC+01:00 (CET)
  - Summer (DST): UTC+02:00 (CEST)
- Postal codes: 91242
- Dialling codes: 09123
- Vehicle registration: LAU, ESB, HEB, N, PEG
- Website: www.ottensoos.de

Ottensoos (German pronunciation: [ˈɔtn̩zoːs]) is a municipality in the district of Nürnberger Land in Bavaria in Germany.
