= Edge of the World (composition) =

Edge of the World is a concerto for five pianos and orchestra by the American composer Nico Muhly. It was commissioned by the Ravinia Festival and was written specifically for the sibling piano group The 5 Browns, whom Muhly met while attending Juilliard School. The piece was first performed by the 5 Browns and Chicago Symphony Orchestra under the direction of James Conlon on August 9, 2011. Muhly dedicated the concerto to the 5 Browns.

== Composition ==
Edge of the World has a duration of approximately 20 minutes and is cast in four movements with one interlude:

Part I: Reykjavík
Interlude: Train
Part II: Salt Lake
Part III: Flat Earth
Part IV: The Night Sky

In the score program notes, Muhly described the composition as "a piece for five pianos (and sometimes orchestra) that is meant to be the soundtrack to living in cities at the extremes of the map: the far north, the end of the road, the far side of the lake." He continued, "Organised in four movements, it begins and ends with a series of interlocking ostinati. Towards the centre of the piece, folk music peeks in and out, sudden polyrhythms disrupt a smooth surface, and the universe of the piece becomes alternately wide and claustrophobic. The piece ends with an image of the night sky at the edge of the earth, shimmering with distant lights and insects near to hand."

=== Instrumentation ===
The work is scored for five pianos and an orchestra consisting of two flutes, two oboes, two clarinets, two bassoons, four horns, two trumpets, two trombones, bass trombone, tuba, two percussionists, harp, and strings.

== Reception ==
Edge of the World has received modest praise from music critics. Reviewing the world premiere, John von Rhein of the Chicago Tribune wrote, "Working within a jumpy, post-minimalist style, Muhly turns the five keyboards into a kind of hyper-piano: one or more pianists take the lead in interlocking patterns, the five functioning rather like members of a musical relay race. Much of the score is driven by percolating ostinatos that, in the second movement, give way to a folksy tune that could have been the main title of a 1950s Hollywood western." He added, "Through it all, your ear is held by Muhly's knack for creating imaginative textures and fields of sun-dappled colors that are constantly shifting in ways you don't always expect. [It] was fun to hear."

Gerald Fisher of the Chicago Classical Review praised moments of the orchestration, despite noting, "The Edge of the World is not groundbreaking and shows influences from Philip Glass and, more to the point, the early Steve Reich of Music for 18 Musicians. Although there are moments of Muhly’s individual voice, the work overall feels like a minor effort with some nice touches of orchestration."
