= Leinburg =

- Municipality
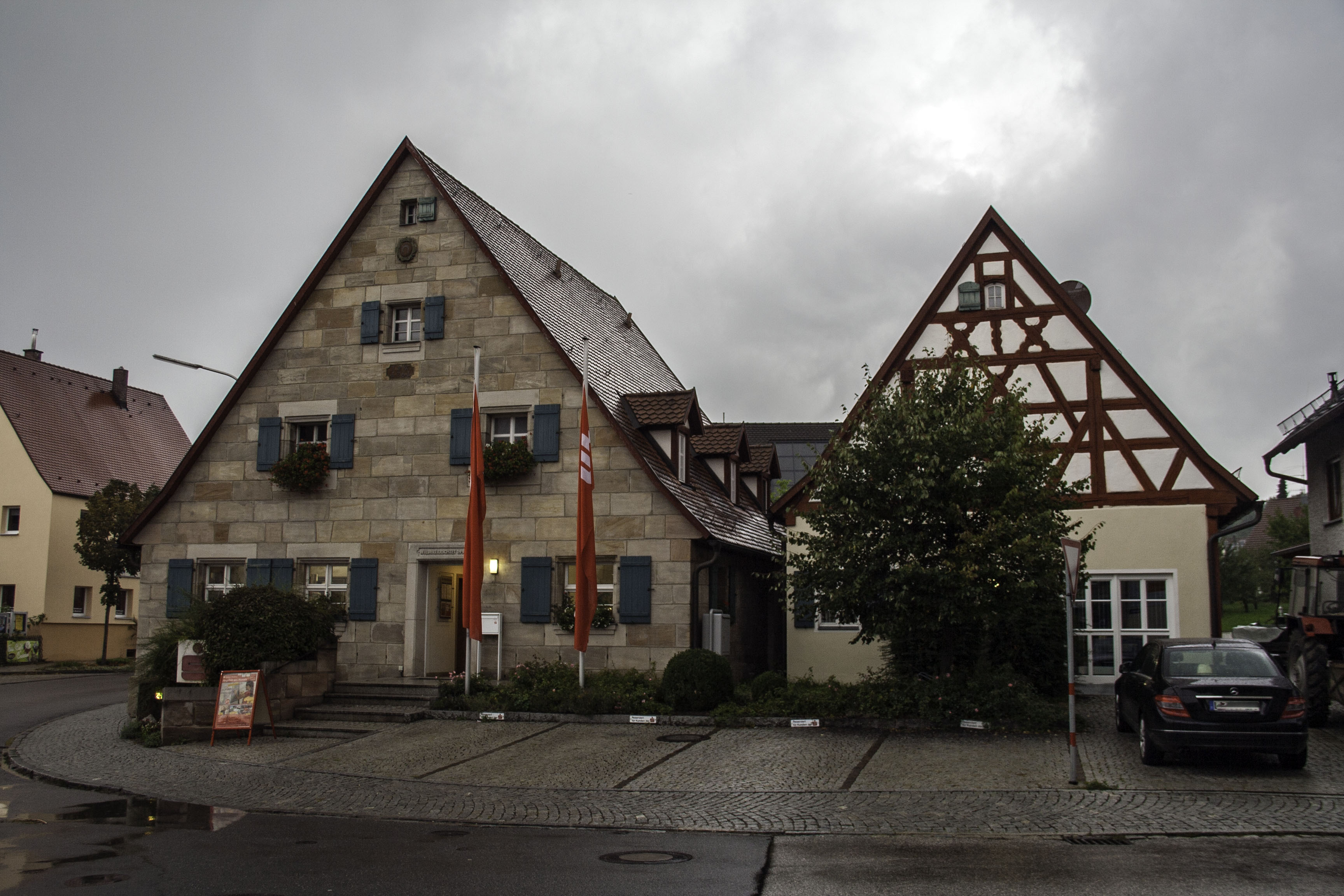
- Centre of Leinburg

- Coat of arms

- Location of Leinburg within Nürnberger Land district
- Interactive map of Leinburg
- Location within Germany Location within Bavaria
- Coordinates: 49°27′06″N 11°18′36″E
- Country: Germany
- State: Bavaria
- Admin. region: Mittelfranken
- District: Nürnberger Land
- Subdivisions: 17 Gemeindeteile

Government
  - Mayor (2020–26): Thomas Kraußer (CSU)

Area
  - Total: 29.44 km^{2} (11.37 sq mi)
- Elevation: 392 m (1,286 ft)

Population (2025-12-31)
  - Total: 6,640
  - Density: 226/km^{2} (584/sq mi)
- Time zone: UTC+01:00 (CET)
  - Summer (DST): UTC+02:00 (CEST)
- Postal codes: 91227
- Dialling codes: 09120, 09187 or 09158
- Vehicle registration: LAU, ESB, HEB, N, PEG
- Website: www.leinburg.de

Leinburg (German pronunciation: [ˈlaɪnbʊʁk]) is a municipality in the district of Nürnberger Land in Bavaria in Germany.

== Geography ==
=== Geographical Location ===
Leinburg lies approximately 20 kilometers east of Nuremberg, directly on the Moritzberg mountain, an offshoot of the Franconian Jura. At 603 meters, the Moritzberg is the highest elevation in the surrounding area. The Haidelbach stream, which flows through almost the entire municipality from east to west, originates south of the village of Entenberg — a municipal subdivision of Leinburg — on the northern slope of the 588-meter-high Balcher hill in the Langes Ried forest.

=== Municipal Subdivisions ===
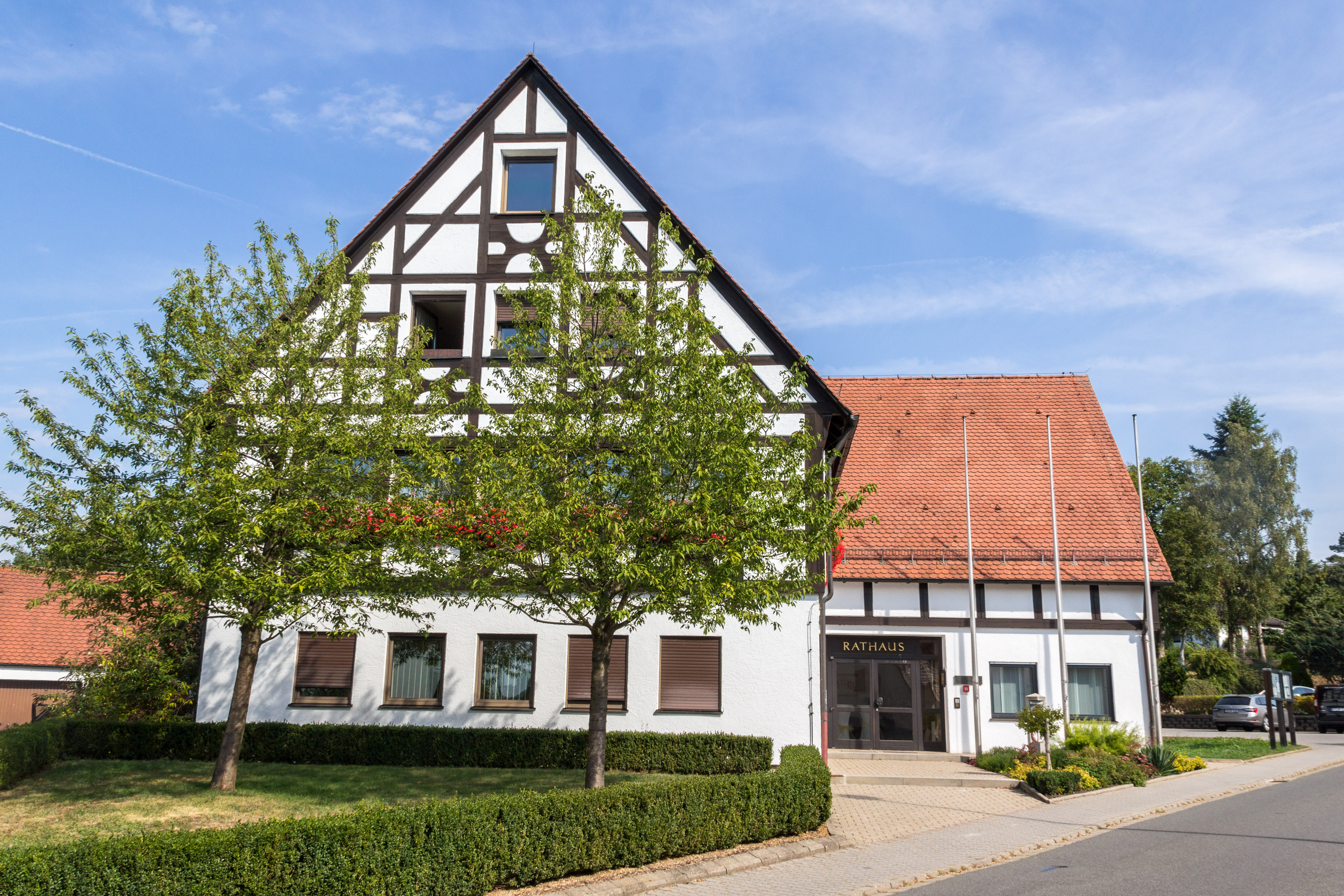
Leinburg Town Hall, 2016

The municipality has 17 municipal subdivisions (the settlement type is indicated in parentheses):

- Diepersdorf (village)
- Entenberg (parish village)
- Ernhofen (village)
- Fuchsmühle (hamlet)
- Gersberg (village)
- Gersdorf (village)
- Heiligenmühle (hamlet)
- Leinburg (parish village)
- Oberhaidelbach (village)
- Pötzling (village)
- Pühlhof (hamlet)
- Reuth (hamlet)
- Scheerau (hamlet)
- Unterhaidelbach (village)
- Weihersberg (village)
- Weißenbrunn (village)
- Winn (village)

== History ==
=== Origin of Name ===
The name of the place could refer to the local linen production and the associated flax cultivation, which was carried out in the past on the slopes of the Moritzberg mountain.

=== First Mentioning ===
There are no reliable historical records about the origin of the place.

Leinburg was first mentioned in a document in an imperial decree issued by Louis the Bavarian in 1299.

Diepersdorf — the largest subdivision of the municipality of Leinburg — was first mentioned in 1079 when King Henry IV gifted Dieprehdesdorf to the ministerialis (unfree knight) Ebbo.

Leinburg's subdivision of Gersdorf was first mentioned in a document of the Burgraves of Nuremberg in the year 1265.

=== Medieval History ===
In 1299, Leinburg was pledged to the Count of Nassau, who in 1360 sold Leinburg, along with the manor of Altdorf, to Burgrave Albrecht the Fair of Nuremberg. Through inheritance or sale, other noble families became lords of Leinburg. In 1504, Leinburg came under the control of the Free Imperial City of Nuremberg. Nuremberg became the patron of the Leinburg church in 1526, and in the same year, the town received its first Protestant pastor.

The village of Leinburg suffered greatly due to wars and plague. The chronicle mentions the years 1547 for the Schmalkaldic War and 1562 as a plague year.

After the Thirty Years' War (1618 – 1648), Leinburg became the new home of numerous exiles from Austria who had to emigrate because of their Protestant faith.

=== Modern Era ===
World War II also left its mark on the village, resulting in 40 destroyed buildings and many homeless people. In the post-war years, the village's population increased due to the influx of refugees. A Catholic parish was founded, which today serves the entire municipality of Leinburg and the municipality of Engelthal. A steady increase in the population was recorded in the following decades as well.

On July 1, 1971, the municipality of Unterhaidelbach, including its constituent villages of Weihersberg and Pühlhof, was incorporated. The following six municipalities, which were independent until the territorial reform in Bavaria, merged with their respective constituent villages into the new unified municipality on May 1, 1978:

- Leinburg, including the constituent villages of Heiligenmühle, Fuchsmühle, Krämersweiher, and Forsthaus.
- Diepersdorf is the largest constituent village of the municipality. The hamlet of Scheerau was part of the former municipality of Diepersdorf.
- Entenberg
- Gersdorf. The former municipality of Gersdorf included Reuth, Pötzling, and Gersberg.
- Oberhaidelbach
- Weißenbrunn with the hamlets of Winn and Ernhofen
