= Vorra =

- Municipality
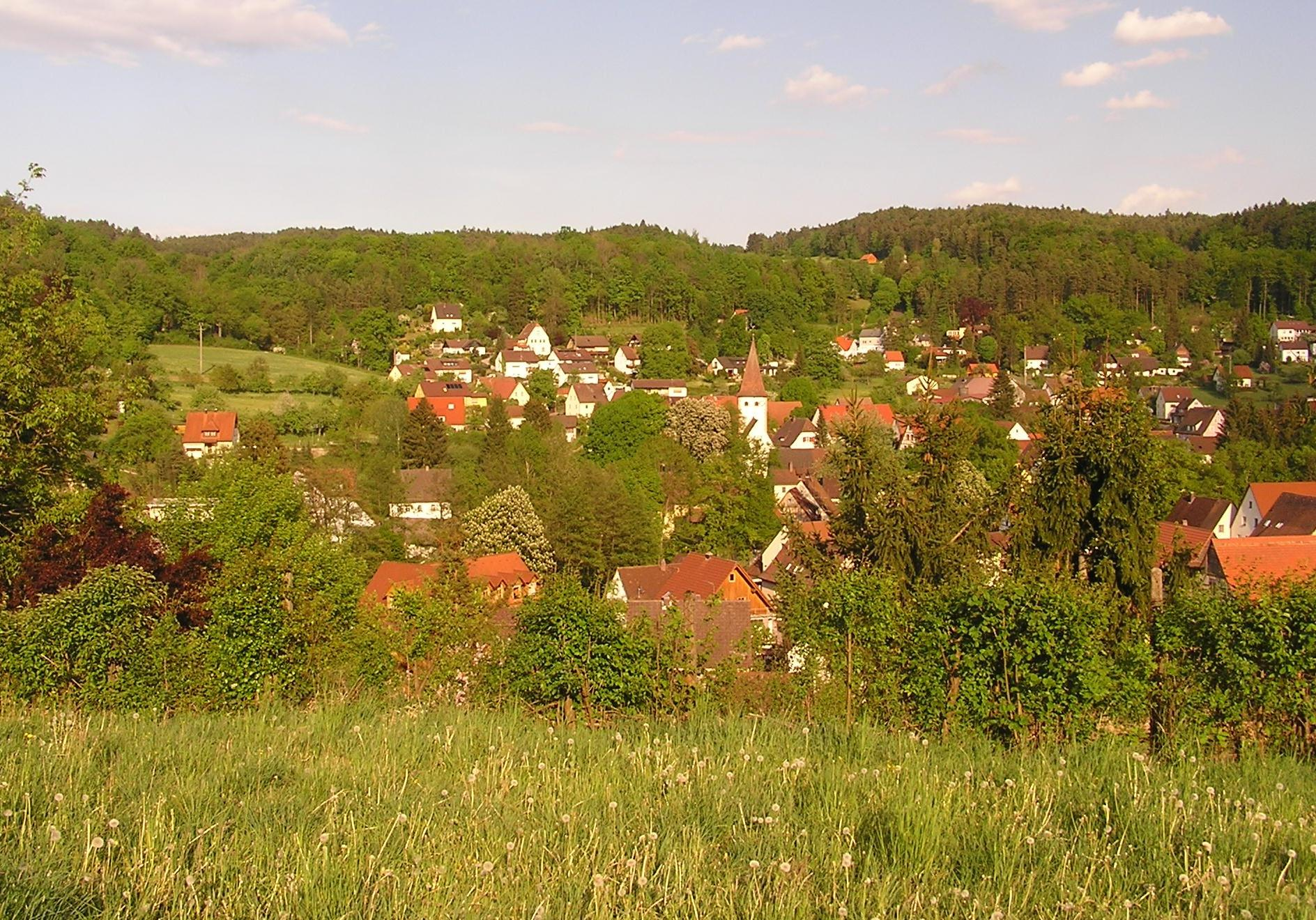
- Vorra in Hersbrucker Alb

- Coat of arms

- Location of Vorra within Nürnberger Land district
- Interactive map of Vorra
- Location within Germany Location within Bavaria
- Coordinates: 49°32′N 11°30′E
- Country: Germany
- State: Bavaria
- Admin. region: Mittelfranken
- District: Nürnberger Land
- Municipal assoc.: Velden
- Subdivisions: 4 Gemeindeteile

Government
  - Mayor (2023–29): Bernd Müller (CSU)

Area
  - Total: 22.08 km^{2} (8.53 sq mi)
- Elevation: 365 m (1,198 ft)

Population (2025-12-31)
  - Total: 1,631
  - Density: 73.87/km^{2} (191.3/sq mi)
- Time zone: UTC+01:00 (CET)
  - Summer (DST): UTC+02:00 (CEST)
- Postal codes: 91247
- Dialling codes: 09152
- Vehicle registration: LAU, ESB, HEB, N, PEG
- Website: www.vorra-mfr.de

Vorra (German pronunciation: [ˈfɔʁa]) is a municipality in the district of Nürnberger Land in Bavaria in Germany.

== Notable inhabitants ==
- Johann Friedrich Stoy (1700–1760), Evangelical theologian
- Hans Vogel (1881–1945), politician (SPD)
