= Velden (Verwaltungsgemeinschaft, Middle Franconia) =

- Verwaltungsgemeinschaft
- Location of Velden within Nürnberger Land district
- Interactive map of Velden
- Location within Germany Location within Bavaria
- Coordinates: 49°37′N 11°31′E
- Country: Germany
- State: Bavaria
- Admin. region: Middle Franconia
- District: Nürnberger Land
- Seat: Velden
- Subdivisions: 3 municipalities

Area
  - Total: 68.18 km^{2} (26.32 sq mi)

Population (2025-12-31)
  - Total: 4,791
  - Density: 70.27/km^{2} (182.0/sq mi)
- Time zone: UTC+01:00 (CET)
  - Summer (DST): UTC+02:00 (CEST)
- Website: www.vgvelden.de

Velden is a Verwaltungsgemeinschaft (municipal association) in the district Nürnberger Land in Bavaria, Germany. Its seat is in Velden.

It consists of the following municipalities:

1. Hartenstein
2. Velden
3. Vorra
