= Henfenfeld (Verwaltungsgemeinschaft) =

- Verwaltungsgemeinschaft
- Location of Henfenfeld within Nürnberger Land district
- Interactive map of Henfenfeld
- Location within Germany Location within Bavaria
- Coordinates: 49°30′N 11°23′E
- Country: Germany
- State: Bavaria
- Admin. region: Middle Franconia
- District: Nürnberger Land
- Seat: Henfenfeld
- Subdivisions: 3 municipalities

Area
  - Total: 42.77 km^{2} (16.51 sq mi)

Population (2025-12-31)
  - Total: 4,361
  - Density: 102.0/km^{2} (264.1/sq mi)
- Time zone: UTC+01:00 (CET)
  - Summer (DST): UTC+02:00 (CEST)
- Website: vg-henfenfeld.de

Henfenfeld is a Verwaltungsgemeinschaft (municipal association) in the district Nürnberger Land in Bavaria, Germany. Its seat is in Henfenfeld.

It consists of the following municipalities:

1. Engelthal
2. Henfenfeld
3. Offenhausen
