= Engelthal =

- Municipality
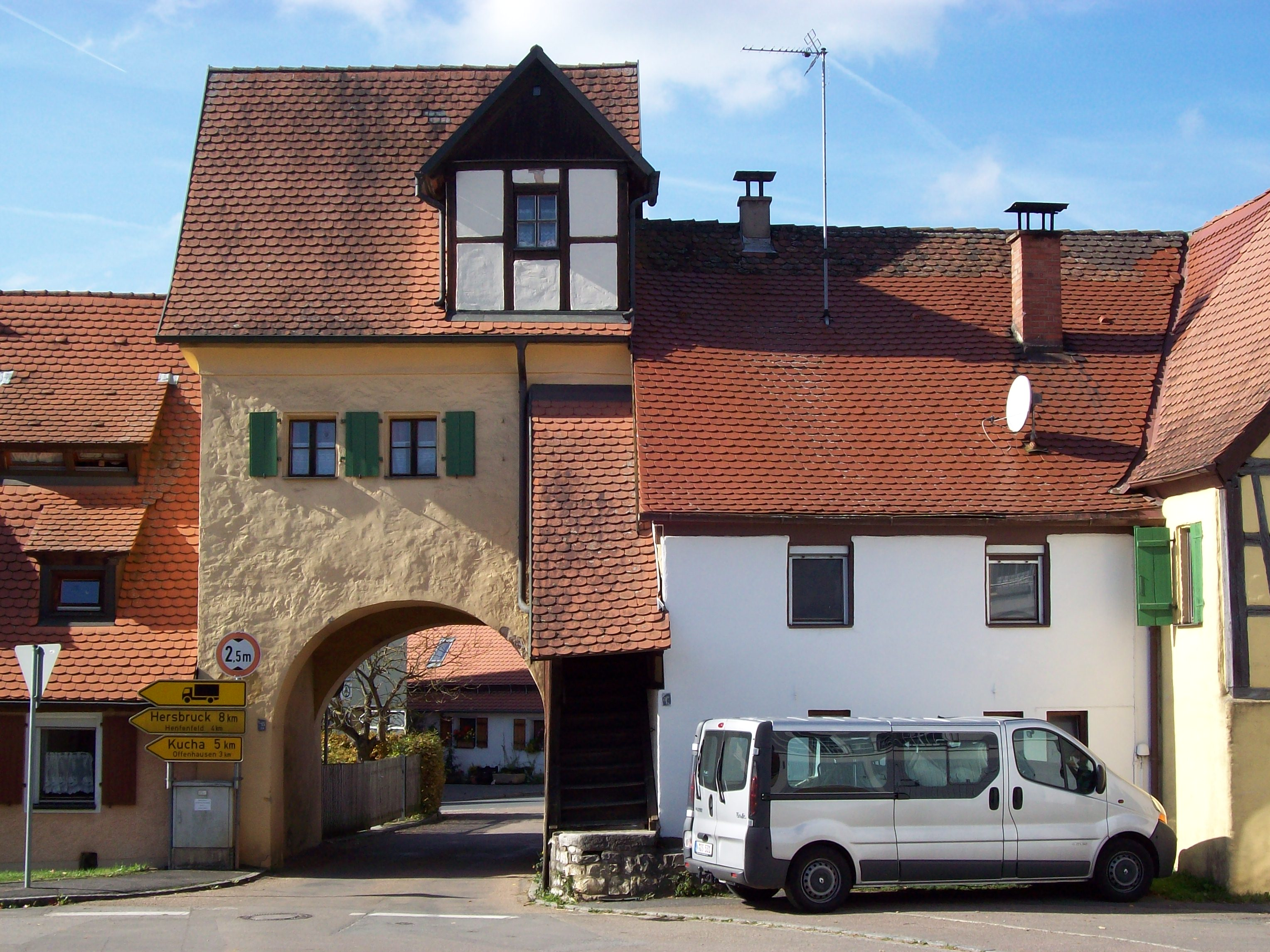
- Eastern Gate of the Engelthal Abbey

- Coat of arms

- Location of Engelthal within Nürnberger Land district
- Interactive map of Engelthal
- Location within Germany Location within Bavaria
- Coordinates: 49°28′N 11°24′E
- Country: Germany
- State: Bavaria
- Admin. region: Mittelfranken
- District: Nürnberger Land
- Municipal assoc.: Henfenfeld
- Subdivisions: 6 Gemeindeteile

Government
  - Mayor (2020–26): Günther Rögner (CSU)

Area
  - Total: 13.63 km^{2} (5.26 sq mi)
- Elevation: 371 m (1,217 ft)

Population (2025-12-31)
  - Total: 1,067
  - Density: 78.28/km^{2} (202.8/sq mi)
- Time zone: UTC+01:00 (CET)
  - Summer (DST): UTC+02:00 (CEST)
- Postal codes: 91238
- Dialling codes: 09158
- Vehicle registration: LAU, ESB, HEB, N, PEG
- Website: www.engelthal.de

Engelthal (German pronunciation: [ˈɛŋl̩taːl]) is a municipality near Nürnberg (Nuremberg) in the Frankenalb (Frankish Alb). The municipality has a population of approximately 1100 people.

== History ==
The place was named Swinnahe in former times and mentioned first in 1058/1059 on the occasion of the consecration of a church by bishop Gundekar von Eichstätt. Engelthal was established as a cloister (Dominican nuns) at 1240 from Ulrich von Königstein auf Reicheneck. Mentioned first officially in 1245 and in 1339 given protection from emperor Ludwig as of the Nürnberger Rat and the city of Nuremberg.

In recent years, residents have remodeled and restored sections of the cloister and cloister wall.

Engelthal is also notable for Engelthal Abbey, the home of several notable medieval writers and mystics, including Christina Ebner and Adelheid Langmann.

== Cultural references ==
- Engelthal is mentioned in chapter XXIII of Henry James's 1875 novel Roderick Hudson, '[...] the eggs of Engelthal were almost as fresh and the cream almost as thick as those of the Connecticut Valley.'.
- Engelthal is one of the settings in The Gargoyle by Andrew Davidson, where one of the main characters, Marianne Engel, is raised as a nun.
