= Offenhausen, Germany =

Offenhausen
- Municipality
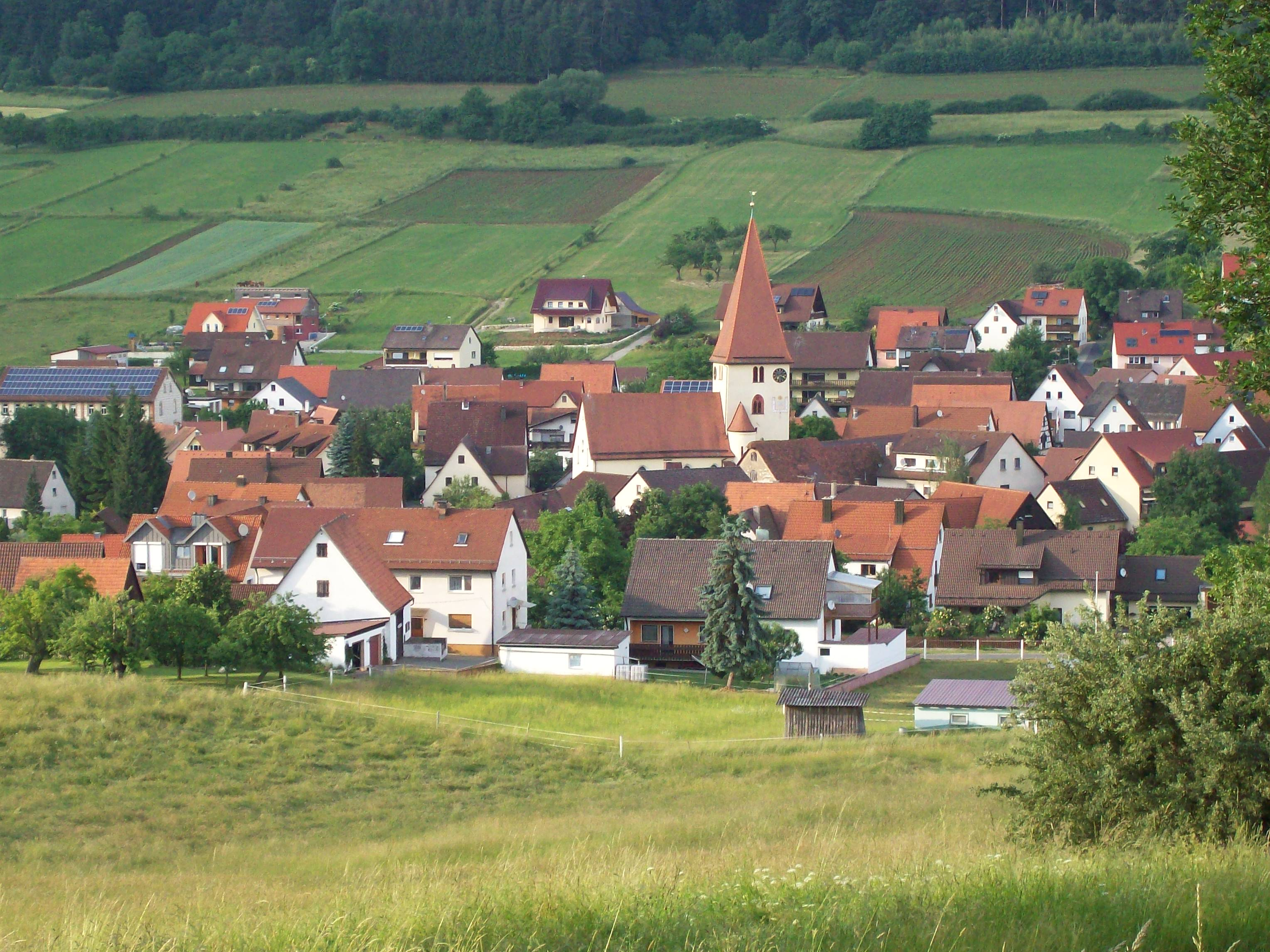
- Offenhausen

- Coat of arms

- Location of Offenhausen within Nürnberger Land district
- Interactive map of Offenhausen
- Location within Germany Location within Bavaria
- Coordinates: 49°27′N 11°25′E
- Country: Germany
- State: Bavaria
- Admin. region: Mittelfranken
- District: Nürnberger Land
- Municipal assoc.: Henfenfeld
- Subdivisions: 14 Gemeindeteile

Government
  - Mayor (2020–26): Martin Pirner

Area
  - Total: 22.50 km^{2} (8.69 sq mi)
- Elevation: 387 m (1,270 ft)

Population (2025-12-31)
  - Total: 1,563
  - Density: 69.47/km^{2} (179.9/sq mi)
- Time zone: UTC+01:00 (CET)
  - Summer (DST): UTC+02:00 (CEST)
- Postal codes: 91238
- Dialling codes: 09158
- Vehicle registration: LAU, ESB, HEB, N, PEG
- Website: www.offenhausen.de

Offenhausen is a municipality in the district of Nürnberger Land in Bavaria in Germany.
