= Andrew Davidson (author) =

Canadian novelist

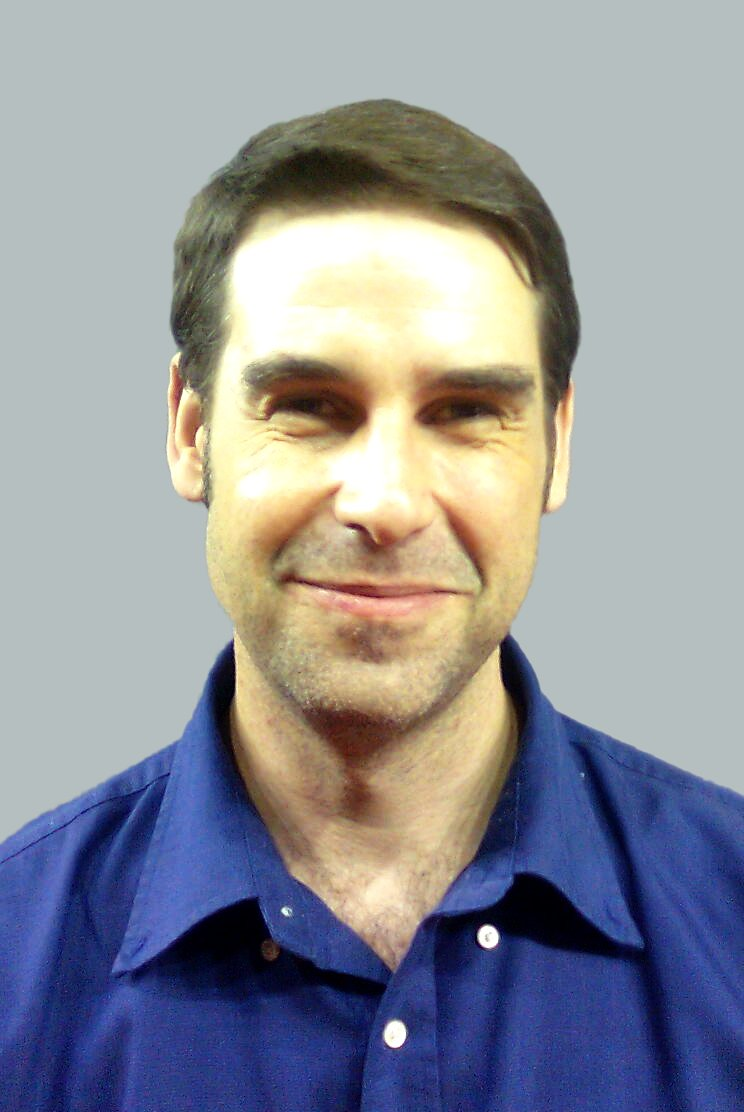
- Born: April 12, 1969 (age 57); Pinawa, Manitoba, Canada
- Occupation: Novelist

Andrew Davidson (born April 12, 1969) is a Canadian novelist from Winnipeg, Manitoba. Born in Pinawa, Manitoba, he graduated with a B.A. in English literature from the University of British Columbia in 1991, and worked as a teacher in Japan before returning to Canada. He has so far published just one novel, The Gargoyle, a psychological thriller about love, religion, mental illness and medieval history, for which he received an unprecedented advance of $1.25 million.
