= Adelheid Langmann =

14th-century German Catholic nun and writer

Adelheid Langmann (c. 1306–1375) was a German Roman Catholic nun, belonging to the Dominican Order at the Engelthal Abbey (located in the Wetterau region of Hesse) in the 14th century.

She is known for her text Revelations, which consists of autobiographical details, prayers, and religious instruction. She was a renowned spiritual teacher during her lifetime.

== Life ==
Adelheid Langmann was a German nun. She belonged to the Dominican Order, and resided at the Engelthal Abbey. She is known for written records of her religious visions, which were collected in a book titled Revelations. Along with the writings of Christina Ebner, these constitute an important text documenting female mysticism in the 14th century.

Langmann was a widow who belonged to a well-established family from Nuremberg, and recorded her revelations on the advice of a lector who worked at Engelthal Abbey.

Langmann's Revelations also contain an account of her own spiritual journey, including biographical details. Langmann writes that her vocation was apparent to her as a child, but she was betrothed to, and married Gottfried Teufel in deference to her parents' wishes. According to Langmann, the marriage was never consummated, and her husband died of illness within a year of the wedding, leaving her free to join the Dominicans.

She joined the order in 1330, and was present there, as was Christina Ebner, when King Charles IV visited the abbey seeking spiritual counsel.

Langmann was renowned during her lifetime, and taught prayers at the abbey, although she was not permitted to hold any official position. It was common for visitors to the abbey to visit particularly to receive instruction from her in religion. These visitors ranged from lay persons, laborers and local residents, to members of the clergy and the aristocracy.

During her lifetime she maintained a close friendship with, and was a mentor to, Marquart der Tokler of Nuremberg, a nobleman and later, cleric who later joined the Augustinians under her guidance, and who recited prayers especially composed for him by Langmann.

Langmann's Revelations is a compilation of prayers, letters, records of visions and other accounts, and is addressed to her fellow women, often using the phrase 'dear sisters' or 'fellow sisters'. Langmann's instructions in the Revelations are a guide on attaining salvation, chiefly through prayer and meditation.

Langman's Revelations was rediscovered in the 19th century by scholars of the German language, who were looking for texts written in the medieval Bavarian language that Langmann used.
