= Rückersdorf, Bavaria =

Rückersdorf
- Municipality
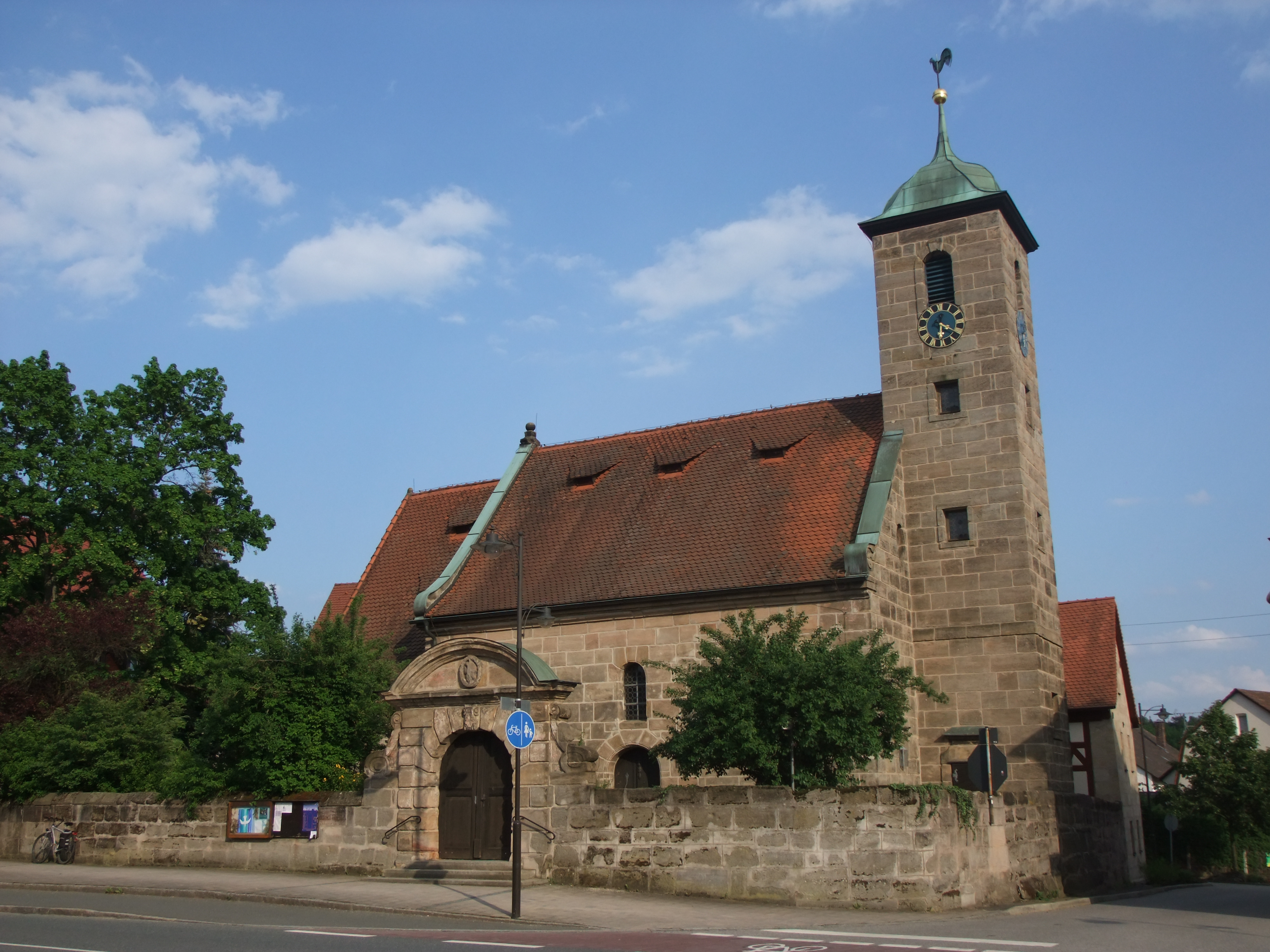
- Protestant church of Saint George

- Coat of arms

- Location of Rückersdorf within Nürnberger Land district
- Interactive map of Rückersdorf
- Location within Germany Location within Bavaria
- Coordinates: 49°29′N 11°14′E
- Country: Germany
- State: Bavaria
- Admin. region: Mittelfranken
- District: Nürnberger Land

Government
  - Mayor (2020–26): Johannes Ballas (CSU)

Area
  - Total: 3.57 km^{2} (1.38 sq mi)
- Elevation: 319 m (1,047 ft)

Population (2025-12-31)
  - Total: 4,749
  - Density: 1,330/km^{2} (3,450/sq mi)
- Time zone: UTC+01:00 (CET)
  - Summer (DST): UTC+02:00 (CEST)
- Postal codes: 90607
- Dialling codes: 0911 and 09123
- Vehicle registration: LAU, ESB, HEB, N, PEG
- Website: www.rueckersdorf.de

Rückersdorf (German pronunciation: [ˈʁʏkɐsdɔʁf]) is a municipality in the district of Nürnberger Land in Bavaria in Germany.
