= Velden (Pegnitz) =

- Town
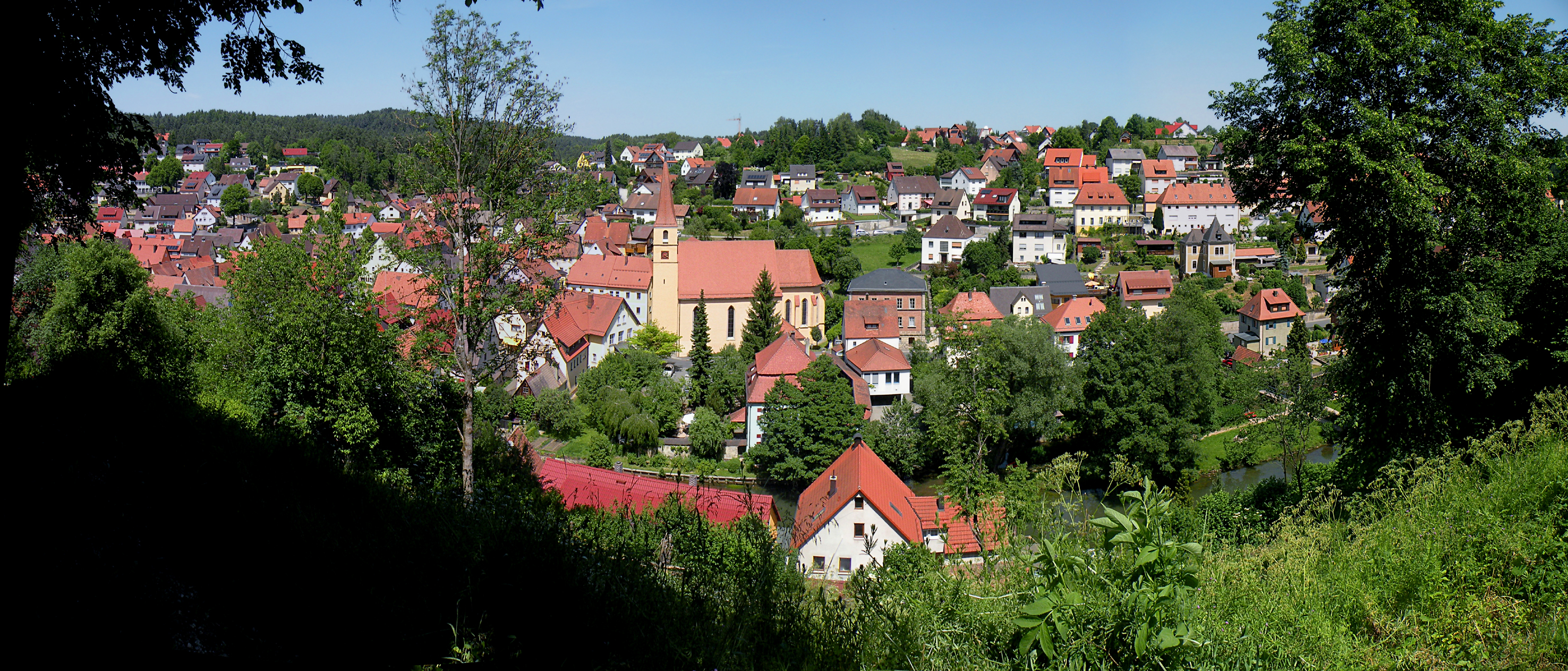
- Velden

- Coat of arms

- Location of Velden within Nürnberger Land district
- Interactive map of Velden
- Location within Germany Location within Bavaria
- Coordinates: 49°37′N 11°31′E
- Country: Germany
- State: Bavaria
- Admin. region: Mittelfranken
- District: Nürnberger Land
- Municipal assoc.: Velden
- Subdivisions: 8 Stadtteile

Government
  - Mayor (2020–26): Herbert Seitz (SPD)

Area
  - Total: 21.34 km^{2} (8.24 sq mi)
- Elevation: 377 m (1,237 ft)

Population (2025-12-31)
  - Total: 1,706
  - Density: 79.94/km^{2} (207.1/sq mi)
- Time zone: UTC+01:00 (CET)
  - Summer (DST): UTC+02:00 (CEST)
- Postal codes: 91235
- Dialling codes: 09152
- Vehicle registration: LAU, ESB, HEB, N, PEG
- Website: gemeindevelden.vgvelden.de

Velden (German pronunciation: [ˈfɛldn̩]) is a town in the district Nürnberger Land, in Bavaria, Germany. It is situated on the river Pegnitz, 16 km (9.9 mi) south of the town Pegnitz, and 36 km (22 mi) northeast of Nuremberg (centre).
