= Schwarzenbruck =

- Municipality
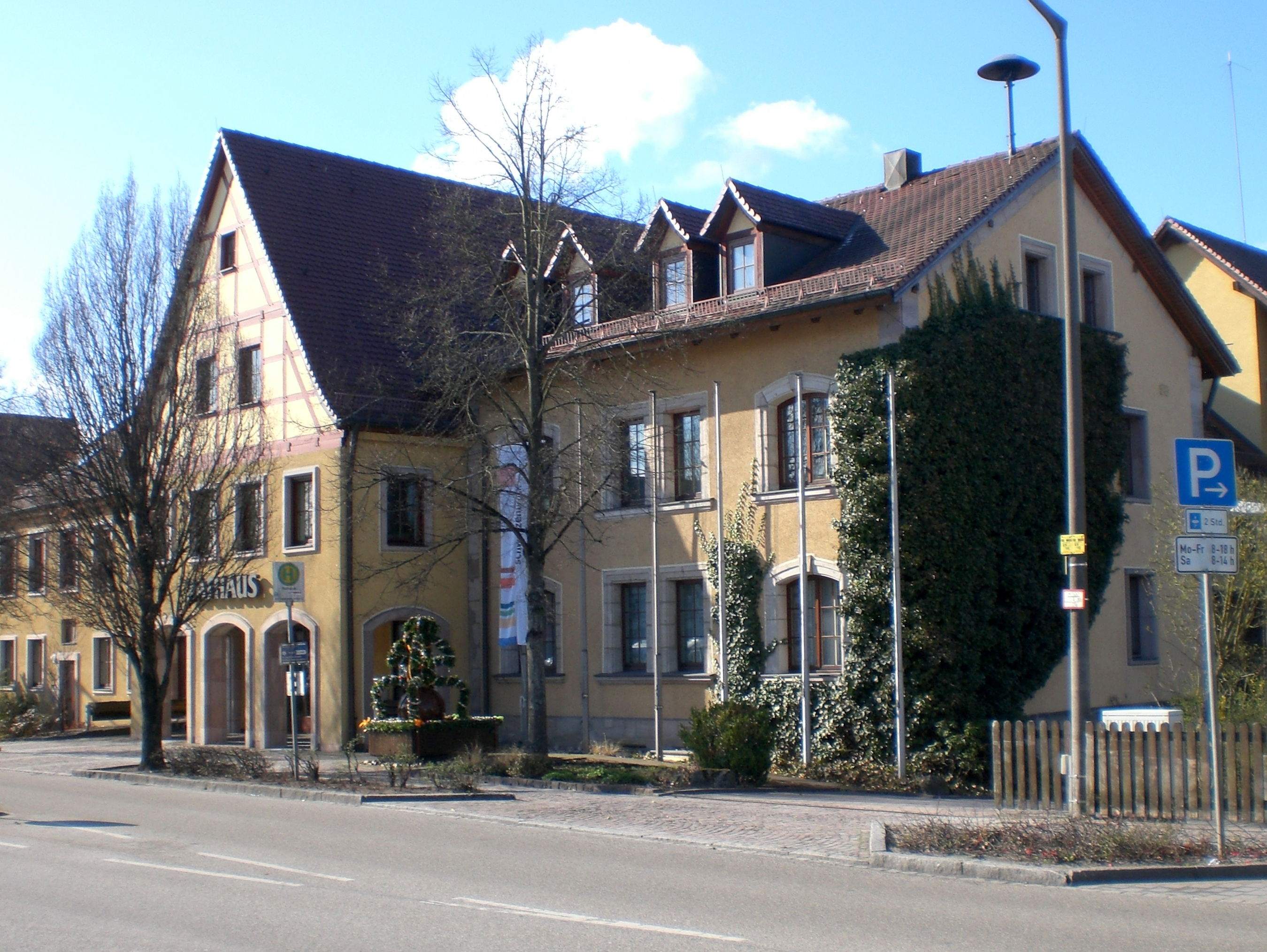
- Town hall

- Coat of arms

- Location of Schwarzenbruck within Nürnberger Land district
- Interactive map of Schwarzenbruck
- Location within Germany Location within Bavaria
- Coordinates: 49°21′N 11°14′E
- Country: Germany
- State: Bavaria
- Admin. region: Mittelfranken
- District: Nürnberger Land

Government
  - Mayor (2020–26): Markus Holzammer (CSU)

Area
  - Total: 22.21 km^{2} (8.58 sq mi)
- Elevation: 365 m (1,198 ft)

Population (2025-12-31)
  - Total: 8,212
  - Density: 369.7/km^{2} (957.6/sq mi)
- Time zone: UTC+01:00 (CET)
  - Summer (DST): UTC+02:00 (CEST)
- Postal codes: 90592
- Dialling codes: 09128 and 09183 (Altenthann/Lindelburg/Pfeifferhütte)
- Vehicle registration: LAU, ESB, HEB, N, PEG
- Website: www.schwarzenbruck.de

Schwarzenbruck is a municipality in the district of Nürnberger Land in Bavaria in Germany.
