= No Boundaries (contest) =

Schools competition in the United States

No Boundaries is a competition between high schools in the United States. Sponsored by USA Today and NASA, it encourages high school students to learn about careers in science, technology, engineering, and mathematics (the STEM fields).

Students may enter individually, or as a group of up to four. Entrants create a project about a career in STEM, which may vary greatly in format. In 2008, the first-place group of four made a PowerPoint presentation called "It's Electric", about electrical engineering. In 2009, the contest was won by four high school students who created a website about astrobiology. The group who won the second-place prize in 2009 made a "cookbook" with recipes for how to become a food scientist for NASA; third place that year created a simple home-made yarn-bound storybook. First place winners receive $2000 to split between members of a group, and a trip to NASA's Kennedy Space Center. Currently (as of the year 2012), No Boundaries is out of funds and is not supplying the contest or the prize. Though, some schools still enforce this contest without a prize.
