= No Boundaries International =

No Boundaries International is a 501(c)(3) non-profit, faith-based organization headquartered in Edmond, Oklahoma that provides speakers, training, medical assistance and evangelism. They operate in the countries of Sierra Leone, West Africa, Haiti, Israel, Mexico, and inner city Oklahoma City.

== History ==
No Boundaries International was incorporated in 2006 by Lori Basey and Sandy Orchard. Basey graduated from the University of Oklahoma with a Bachelor of Science in Occupational Therapy and from the unaccredited Christian Life School of Theology with a Doctorate in Ministry, and began practice as a licensed therapist in Oklahoma in 1991, with specialties in acute psychiatric care, including trauma counseling. Orchard graduated from Point Loma College with a Bachelor of Science in Nursing. Basey and Orchard met in 2002.

== Mission ==
The group states that its main goals are to free people from dependence on outside help and encourage self-sufficiency. Stated core principles include the conviction that every person deserves life's basic necessities. The group also emphasizes inner healing, training, medical help, and evangelism.

== Programs ==
NBI has programs both abroad and in the US. Their international locations include Sierra Leone, Haiti, Israel, and Mexico. Local projects take place in Oklahoma.

- In Sierra Leone, "Project Youth in Crisis" provides food, clothing, homes, education, medical care, therapeutic services and Christian evangelism. In 2008, Oklahoma Christian School raised $75,000 towards the Project Youth in Crisis for their H.E.R.O.E.S.(Hands Extended Reflecting Our Exalted Savior) week. .
- "The Forgotten" is a program focused on the at-risk children and youth of the world, and provides basic necessities, education, medical care, and activities.
- "Project Hope" focusses on the homeless, the oppressed, prostitutes and the disadvantaged elderly in the Oklahoma City inner city, providing Bible studies, life skills training, targeted outreaches, after school/summer children and youth programs, and prevention and wellness training.
- In Acuna, Mexico, NBI partners with The World Outreach Center based in Del Rio, Texas to provide villages of cardboard dwellings with holiday shoeboxes full of daily needs, as well as offering evangelism and prayer.
