= The Gargoyle (novel) =

2008 novel by Andrew Davidson

- Vintage Canada Edition, 2009
- Author: Andrew Davidson
- Language: English
- Genre: Novel
- Publisher: Random House (CA); Doubleday (US); Canongate Books (UK)
- Publication date: August 5, 2008
- Publication place: Canada
- Media type: Print Hardcover
- Pages: 480 pp
- ISBN: 978-0-307-35677-2 (US), 1847671683 (UK)
- OCLC: 192053061

The Gargoyle is the debut novel by Andrew Davidson. It was published in 2008.

== Plot ==
The Gargoyle follows two different timelines, one in the form of a story (or ‘memory’), and one in real time. In real time, an unnamed atheist and former hardcore porn star with a troubled childhood is driving under the influence of alcohol and drugs. Hallucinating that a volley of arrows is being shot at him from a forest, he swerves off the road and into a ravine. There his car sets alight, and he begins to burn. Just as he thinks he will die, the car tips into a creek and he survives, though badly burned. While recovering, the Burned Man becomes addicted to morphine and believes there is now a snake in his spine. Hatching a suicide plan, he gets to know a visitor named Marianne Engel, who is a sculptor suspected of having manic depression or schizophrenia. Humoring her at first as she believes she knew him several hundred years prior, they soon begin a friendship/ relationship, and he moves in with her. Throughout, Marianne reveals their ‘past’, and tells tales of love and hope, inspiring the Burned Man to live.

Their ‘past’ story begins in fourteenth-century Germany, at a monastery named Engelthal. A baby is found at the gates, and taken in and raised as a nun. The young sister Marianne is soon found to possess incredible language skills, understanding languages she has never been taught. One day, a man is brought to the monastery. He is severely burned, except for a small rectangle over his heart where there is an arrow wound, caused by a copy of Dante's Inferno, which he took from an Italian friend, blocking the burning arrow which struck him. The man is a member of a Condotta, a mercenary troop. The nuns believe the burned man is too injured to live. Marianne however looks after him, and he survives, and the two grow closer as she translates and reads to him Dante's Inferno. Finding love with each other, the Burned Man and Marianne flee the monastery and begin a new life together, getting married and conceiving a baby.

One day while out shopping, they see the troop that the Burned Man was once a part of. If he is found alive, he will be put to death for being a deserter. Seeing an old friend of his, Brandeis, still with the Condotta, Marianne lures him back to their apartment where the two soldiers reunite like brothers. Brandeis too is eager to escape, so they hatch a plan. After a few months, Brandeis has escaped, and comes to live with Marianne and the Burned Man. But trouble follows as they are hunted down by the Condotta. Heavily pregnant, Marianne and the two men try to escape. Eventually they are caught. Brandeis is executed and the Burned Man is tied up and burned alive once more. In order to spare him pain, Marianne shoots an arrow through his heart, exactly through the first wound. However, the Condotta see her, and chase her over a frozen river. Falling through, Marianne encounters three ‘presences’, who claim they are now her three masters. As penance for the sins she had committed, she was told she now has a chest full of ‘hearts’, that she must give away, which she does in the form of sculpting. She will have one heart left for her lover, who must ‘accept it, and then give it back’ to set her free.

As their love story unfolds past and present, Marianne also spins romantic tales from across the centuries and around the world that defy pain and suffering and bring hope and succor to her deeply damaged friend. Meanwhile, her own mental state begins to worsen, and she spends more time carving.

When Marianne becomes aware of the narrator's continued morphine addiction she forces him to go cold turkey, during which he experiences a vivid hallucination in which he meets the protagonists of the stories Marianne has told him, and experiences their personal hell, all the while healing slowly until, ultimately, he looks exactly as he had before the car crash, and is told that he can choose to stay, maintaining his physical beauty, or jump off a cliff to be reunited with Marianne, which he does.

Upon his awakening, Marianne resumes her carving, becoming more and more frenzied, neglecting to care for herself, the narrator, or her beloved dog, Bougatsa. After returning from hospital after an operation, the narrator discovers Marianne has carved his name into her chest, and has her committed to hospital to be treated for exhaustion. She returns and soon begins carving, but neither the narrator nor Marianne's friend and agent, Jack, are able to convince her to stop nor have her legally committed for her own safety. They resign themselves, instead, to caring for her as she carves. Once she finishes the penultimate carving she reveals that her final carving isn't another gargoyle but a statue of the narrator, which he sits for and she carves at a much more leisurely pace.

Once the statue is complete, Marianne and the narrator go to the beach at night, where she finishes the tale of their past love. She asks the narrator if he loves her and he confirms that he does, telling her that the car crash was the best thing that ever happened to him since it brought the two together. After this revelation, Marianne commits suicide by walking into the ocean while the narrator watches, understanding that while she would have come back had he asked, it would have meant her mission- as she saw it- was incomplete, since her last heart had never been returned to her.

Due to the unusual circumstances of Marianne's death, the narrator initially comes under suspicion, but is soon cleared due to the testimonies of both Jack and witnesses at the beach. The narrator goes to a safety deposit box Marianne set up for him, in which he finds enough money to keep him going until she can be declared legally dead (due to the absence of a body) and two copies of The Inferno which seem to corroborate her claims; one is an early edition in the original Italian, singed around the edges and with a slit which seems to have been made by an arrow, while the other is a German edition which is later confirmed to both predate any known translation, but which holds the trademarks of an unknown scribe working at Engelthal monastery.

The narrator takes up sculpting and finds he has an unusual talent for it, but rather than carving statues he instead spends more time chipping away at the statue Marianne carved of him, resolving himself to ask a friend to kill him with a bow and arrow once his task is complete, thus reuniting with Marianne.

== Reception ==
Janet Maslin of The New York Times reviewed the book, saying "So for all those who enter here, there is no need to abandon hope. Lessons are learned, love is found, spirits are restored, and faith is revealed, all in the overheated cauldron of Mr. Davidson's imagination."
