= Alfeld, Bavaria =

Alfeld
- Municipality
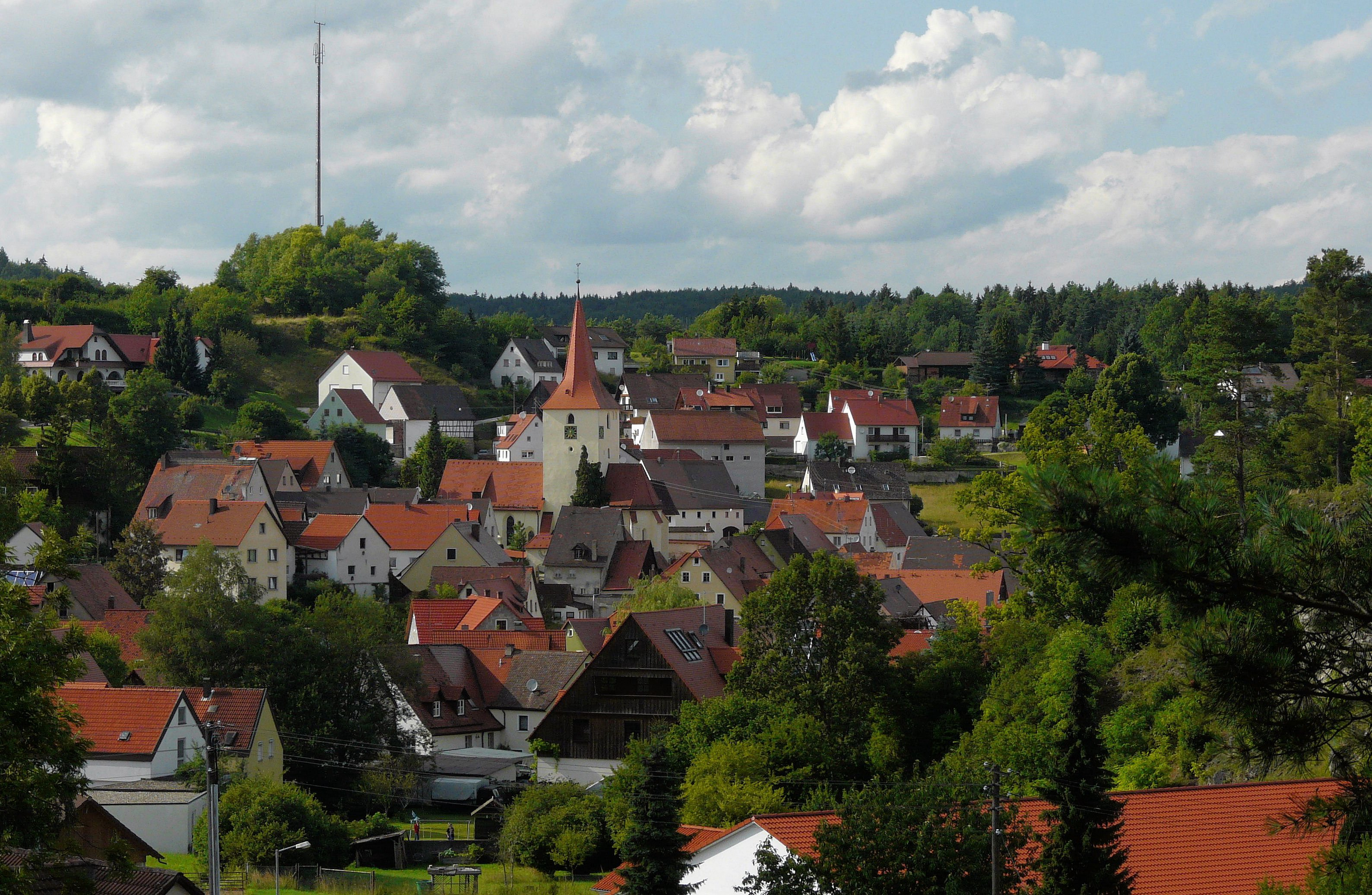
- View of Alfeld

- Coat of arms

- Location of Alfeld within Nürnberger Land district
- Interactive map of Alfeld
- Location within Germany Location within Bavaria
- Coordinates: 49°26′N 11°33′E
- Country: Germany
- State: Bavaria
- Admin. region: Mittelfranken
- District: Nürnberger Land
- Municipal assoc.: Happurg
- Subdivisions: 18 Gemeindeteile

Government
  - Mayor (2020–26): Yvonne Geldner-Lauth (FW)

Area
  - Total: 17.95 km^{2} (6.93 sq mi)
- Elevation: 485 m (1,591 ft)

Population (2025-12-31)
  - Total: 1,126
  - Density: 62.73/km^{2} (162.5/sq mi)
- Time zone: UTC+01:00 (CET)
  - Summer (DST): UTC+02:00 (CEST)
- Postal codes: 91236
- Dialling codes: 09157
- Vehicle registration: LAU, ESB, HEB, N, PEG
- Website: www.alfeld-mfr.de

Alfeld (German pronunciation: [ˈalfɛlt]) is a municipality in the district of Nürnberger Land in Bavaria in Germany. Alfeld has around 1100 inhabitants (2013) and is famous for their traditional Kermesse which the people celebrate at the end of August every year.

== Pictures ==
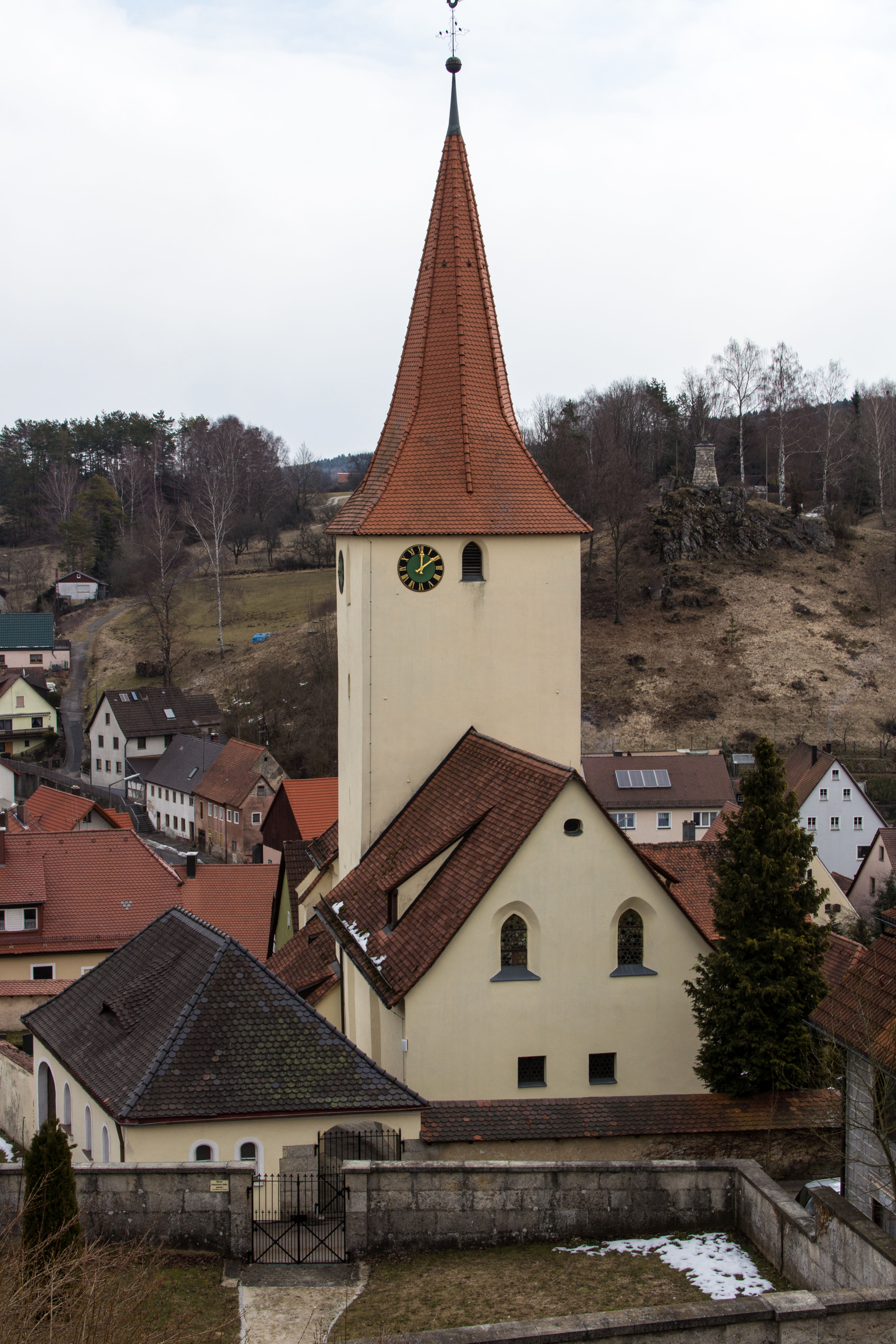
St. Bartholomew's Church

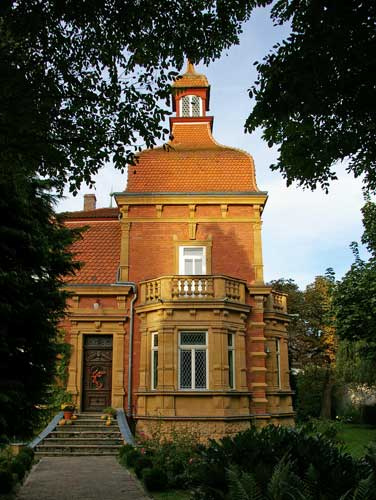
Neo-Renaissance Villa, Untere Bach Street

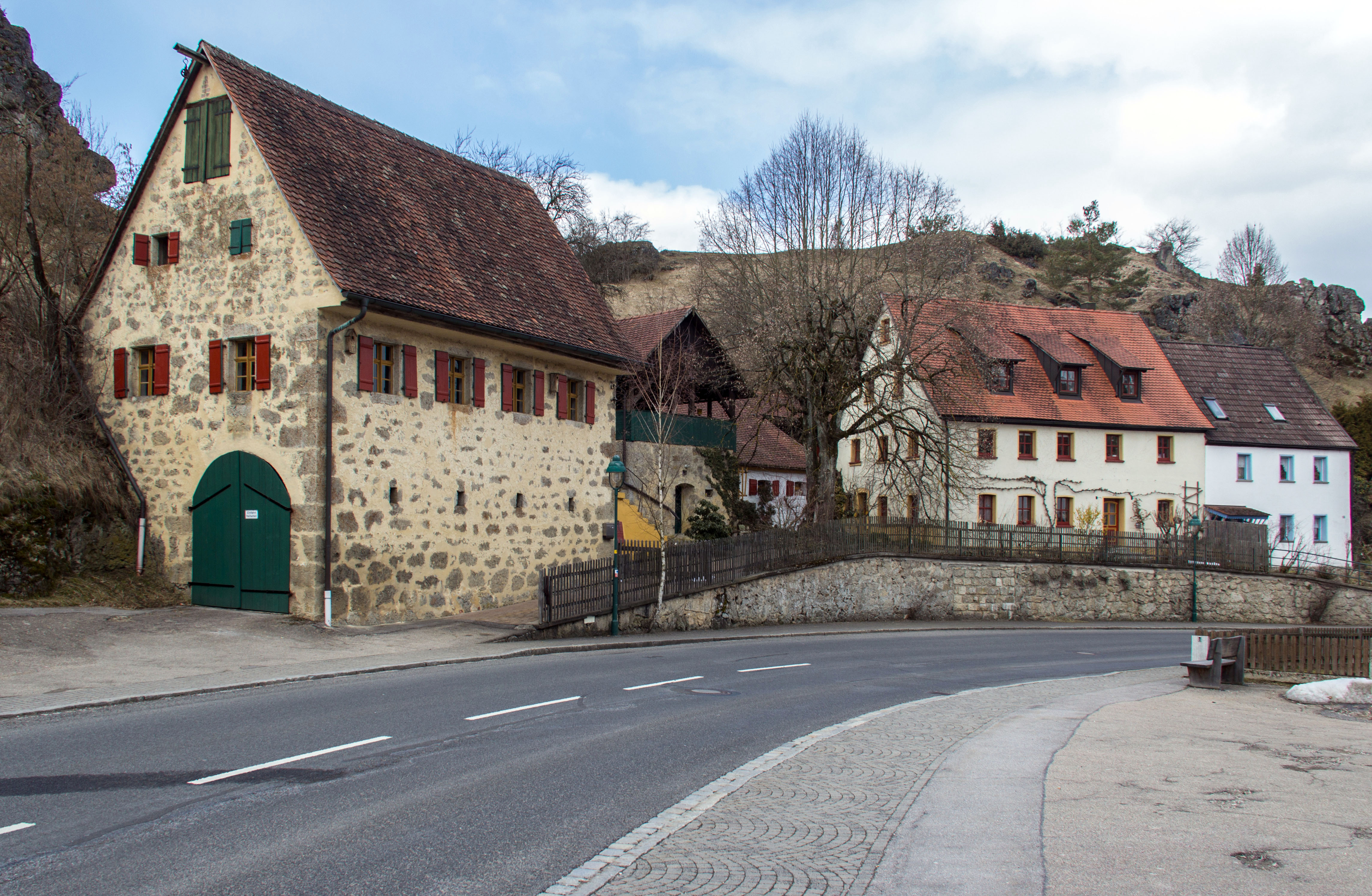
Main Street of Alfeld

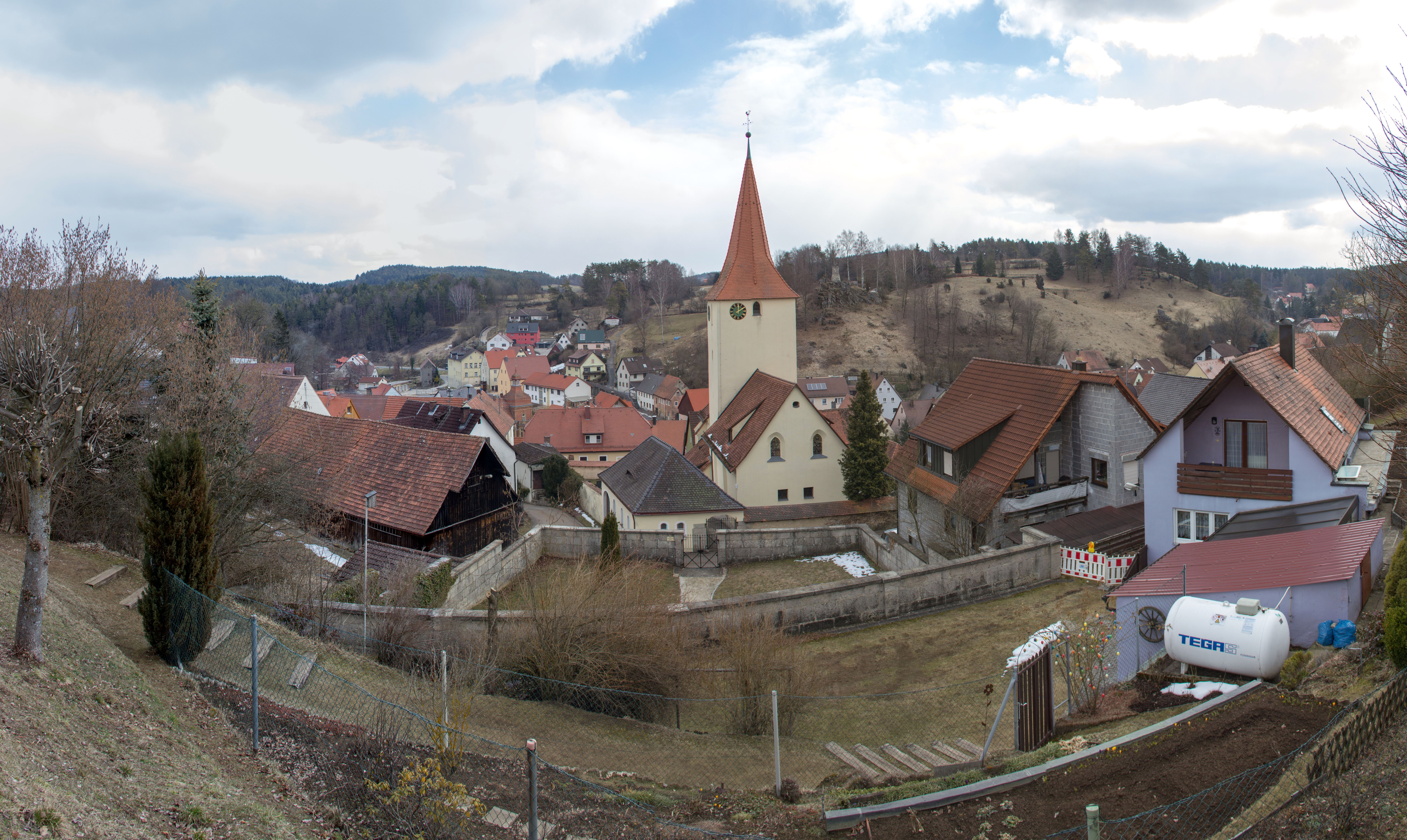
Panorama of Alfeld
