= Gargoyles (Liebermann) =

Suite for piano by Lowell Liebermann

Gargoyles, Op. 29, a four-movement suite for solo piano written by the American composer Lowell Liebermann in 1989.

The suite was commissioned by the Tcherepnin Society for the pianist Eric Himy, who played its world premiere that October 14 at Alice Tully Hall in New York City.

The score exemplifies Liebermann's modernist style, in which tonal harmony and expressive gestures grounded in tradition coexist with avant-garde procedures. The piece has become one of Liebermann's most popular efforts, receiving more than ten recordings.

Many cathedral gargoyles portray grotesque faces with great humor, and Liebermann intends precisely that in his pieces, which have the mordant wit of Sergei Prokofiev's "bad boy" style in their ancestry. The brief opening movement commences with an arresting three-note “signal” and move forward with perpetual motion rhythms, the narrative studded with shock-effects. The following Adagio semplice, by contrast, is deeply introverted, presenting melancholy melodizing over patterns based on two alternating chords. Later, a still slower melody unfolds against repetitions of a single note. Crystalline sonorities mark the third Gargoyle which floats a songful theme over luminous liquid swirls, and ultimately develops into a duet. Mordancy and menace return in the finale, which is dominated by demonic galloping rhythms, as textures grow steadily more dense and virtuoso gestures steadily more flamboyant.
