= Schlossberg =

Schlossberg or Schloßberg (German for Castle Mountain; usually a hill or mountain with a "castle" on it) may refer to:

== Places ==
- Schlossberg Castle (disambiguation)

=== Austria ===
- Schlossberg (Graz), a hill in Graz
- Schloßberg (Leibnitz), a town in the district of Leibnitz in Styria

=== France ===
- Schlossberg, a hill near Husseren-les-Châteaux in Alsace on which the ruins of les Trois Châteaux stand
- Schlossberg, a hill near Katzenthal in Alsace on which the ruin of Château du Wineck stands
- Schlossberg, a hill near Kaysersberg in Alsace on which the ruin of Château de Kaysersberg stands
- Schlossberg, a hill near Reinhardsmunster in Alsace on which the ruin of Château d'Ochsenstein stands
- Schlossberg, a hill near Riquewihr in Alsace on which the ruin of Château de Bilstein stands

=== Germany ===
- Schlossberg (Bavaria), a part of the municipality of Stephanskirchen in Bavaria
- Schloßberg (Bopfingen), a suburb of the city of Bopfingen in Baden-Württemberg
- Schlossberg (Brandenburg), a hill in Brandenburg
- Schlossberg (Freiburg), a hill near the city of Freiburg im Breisgau
- Schlossberg Ulrichstein, a mountain in Hesse
- Schloßberg (Pegnitz), a mountain in Bavaria
- Schlossberg von Tettelham, a mountain in Bavaria
- Spieser Schlossberg, a mountain in Bavaria
- Strahlenfelser Schlossberg, a mountain in Bavaria
- Schloßberg (Stolpen), a hill formed from basalt columns in Saxony

=== Other countries ===
- Schlossberg (Romania), the German name for the village of Chinari, in Sântana de Mureș, Romania
- Schlossberg (Uri), a mountain in Central Switzerland
- Schlossberg, Bratislava, part of Podhradie, Bratislava, Slovakia

== Other uses ==
- Schlossberg Textil, a Swiss manufacturer of bed linen
- Schlossberg (surname)

== See also ==
- Schlosberg, a surname
- Castle Hill (disambiguation)
- Castle Mountain (disambiguation)
