= Castle Hill =

Castle Hill may refer to:

== Places ==
=== Australia ===
- Castle Hill, a small hill and land area in Bicton, Western Australia
- Castle Hill, New South Wales, a suburb of Sydney
- Castle Hill, Queensland, a suburb of Townsville
  - Castle Hill, Townsville, a granite monolith

=== England ===
- Castle Hill, Brighton, a Site of Special Scientific Interest near Brighton, East Sussex
- Castle Hill, Cambridge, a hill and street in Cambridge
- Castle Hill, Chessington, a Local Nature Reserve in London
- Castle Hill, Dudley Castle, West Midlands
- Castle Hill, Englefield Green, Surrey
- Castle Hill, Filleigh, a privately owned Palladian House in North Devon
- Castle Hill, Folkestone, a hill on the North Downs near Folkestone, Kent
- Castle Hill, Hampshire, Iron Age fortification the New Forest in Hampshire
- Castle Hill, Huddersfield, in the county of West Yorkshire in England
- Castle Hill, Malvern Hills, in the parish of Wichenford
- Castle Hill, Mere, in Wiltshire, England
- Castle Hill, Oxfordshire, part of Wittenham Clumps
- Castle Hill, Rattray, Devon
- Castle Hill, Stockport, Greater Manchester
- Castle Hill, Ipswich, Suffolk, an area of Ipswich
  - Castle Hill Ward, Ipswich
- Great Ashfield Castle, Suffolk, England
- Castle Hill, Thetford, an earthwork fortification in Thetford, Norfolk
- Castle Hill, Torrington, Iron Age earthworks and hill fort in Devon
- Castle Hill, Winchester, Council Chamber for Hampshire County Council
- Castle Hill, Wolverley, Worcestershire

=== Scotland ===
- Castle Hill, Caprington, East Ayrshire.
- Castlehill, Dumbarton, in Scotland
- Castlehill, Edinburgh
- Castlehill, Perth and Kinross, a location
- Castlehill, South Ayrshire, a location
- Castlehill, Scottish Borders, a location
- Castlehill Fort, the Roman Fort on the Antonine Wall in Scotland, near Bearsden

=== Wales ===
- Castle Hill, Ceredigion
- Castle Hill, Tenby

=== Ireland ===
- Castle Hill, Kerry, 600 m peak in Slieve Mish Mountains
- Castlehill, County Mayo, a village in County Mayo, Ireland

=== United States ===
- Castle Hill (Sitka, Alaska), an archaeological site
- Castle Hill, California, a census-designated place
- Castle Hill, Maine, a town in Aroostook County
- Castle Hill (Ipswich, Massachusetts), a historic house
- Castle Hill, Bronx, New York, a neighborhood in New York City
- Castle Hill Light, Newport, Rhode Island, a historic lighthouse and inn
- Castle Hill (Virginia), a historic plantation in Albemarle County
- Castle Hills, Texas, a small city in Bexar County

=== Other countries ===
- Castle Hill, Newfoundland and Labrador, Canada
- Castle Hill (Buda), the oldest part of the Hungarian capital
- Castle Hill, New Zealand
- Castle Hill (Vilnius), Lithuania
- Castle Hill, Ljubljana, Slovenia, the location of the Ljubljana Castle
- Linnanmäki (Castle Hill), an amusement park in Helsinki, Finland
- Zamkova Hora (Kyiv) (Castle Hill), Kyiv, Ukraine

== Ships ==
- SS Castle Hill, a British cargo ship in service 1949-50

== See also ==
- Castle Hill convict rebellion Australia in 1804.
- Schlossberg (disambiguation), for a number of articles named Castle Hill in German
- Castle on the Hill (disambiguation)
- Castle Mound (disambiguation)
