= Castle Mound (disambiguation) =

Castle Mound may refer to:

- The motte of a motte-and-bailey castle
- Local name of Cambridge Castle, England
- Local name of Barnstaple Castle, England
- Castle Mound, part of the Kernavė Mounds complex, Lithuania

== See also ==
- Castle Mountain (disambiguation)
- Castle Hill (disambiguation)
- Schlossberg (disambiguation), "Castle Hill" in German
- Zamkova Hora (disambiguation), "Castle Hill" in Ukrainian
