= Castle Mountain (disambiguation) =

Castle Mountain is a peak in Banff National Park, Alberta, Canada.

Castle Mountain may also refer to:

Canada

- Castle Mountain, Alberta or Castle Junction, a locality near the mountain in Banff
- Castle Mountain Resort, near Pincher Creek, Alberta
- Castle Mountain (British Columbia), a mountain in the Flathead Range, near Fernie

United States

- Castle Mountain (Alaska), in the Wrangell Mountains
- Castle Mountain (Carbon County, Montana), a mountain in the Beartooth Range
- Castle Mountain (Hampshire County, West Virginia)
- Castle Mountain (Pendleton County, West Virginia)
- Castle Mountain (Washington), Cascade Range
- Castle Mountains (Montana), an island range
- Castle Mountains (California), a range in the eastern Mojave

== See also ==
- Castle Towers Mountain, near Garibaldi Lake, British Columbia, Canada
- Schlossberg (disambiguation), for a number of articles named Castle Mountain in German
