= Hiltpoltstein Castle =

High medieval castle in Hiltpoltstein, Germany

- Markt Hiltpoltstein
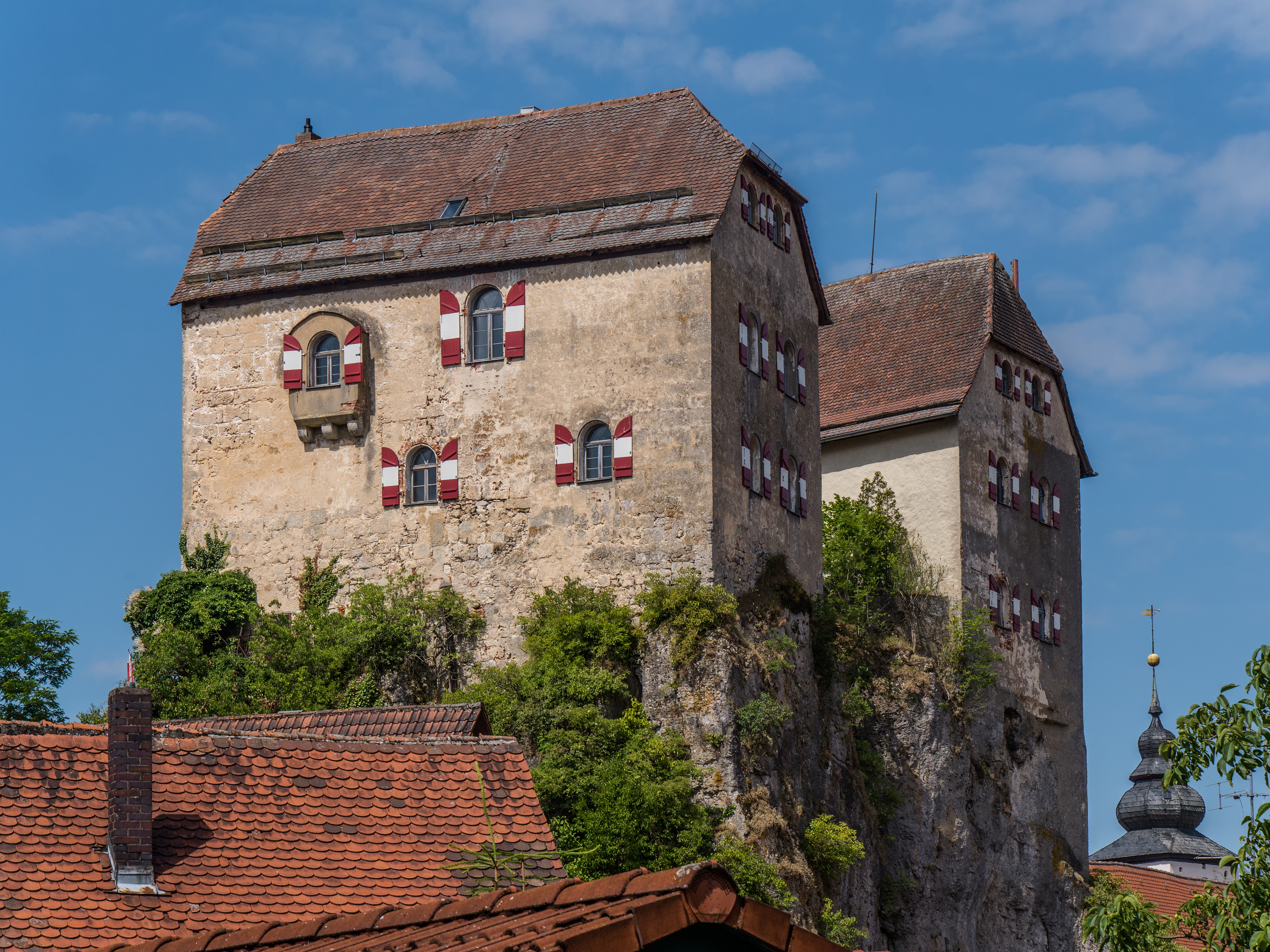
- Hiltpoltstein Castle

Site information
- Type: hill castle, summit location
- Code: DE-BY
- Condition: largely preserved

Location
- Coordinates: 49°39′35″N 11°19′19″E
- Height: 530 m above sea level (NN)

Site history
- Built: Foundation walls 11/12th century, additions: end of the 16th century

Garrison information
- Occupants: ministeriales

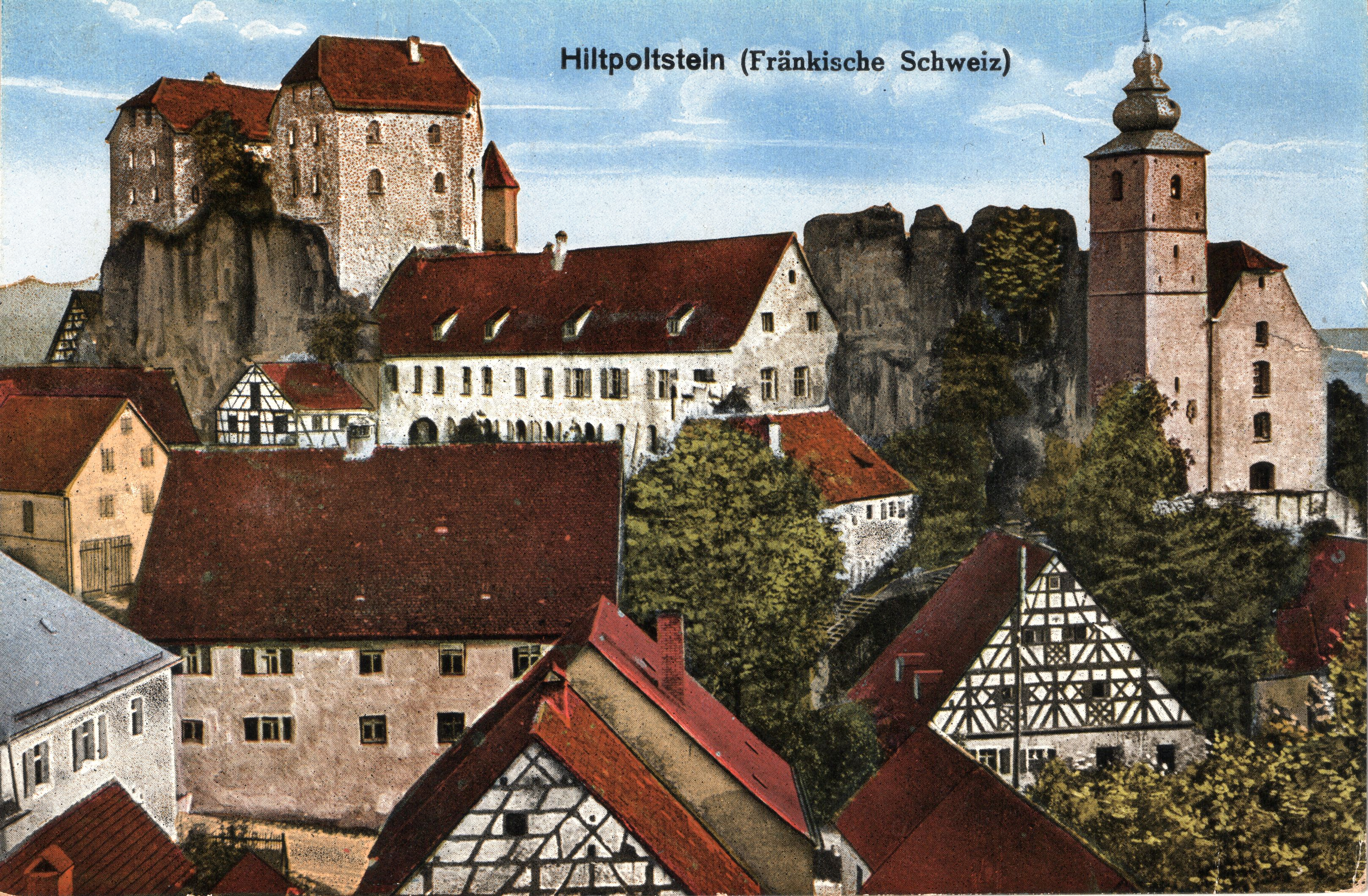
The village and castle of Hiltpoltstein

Hiltpoltstein Castle (German: Burg Hiltpoltstein) was originally a high mediaeval aristocratic castle dating to the 11th or 12th century. It stands in the centre of the market village of Markt Hiltpoltstein in the Upper Franconian county of Forchheim in the south German state of Bavaria. Its present appearance as a triple-winged building goes back to renovations carried out at the end of the 16th century.

== Location ==
The hilltop castle stands on a dolomite crag (530 m above sea level (NN)) and forms the heart of the village of Hiltpoltstein (518 m above sea level (NN)). The roughly 20-metre-high rocks are - like most other examples in Franconian Switzerland – the remains of fossil sponge reefs of the White Jurassic. In the vicinity there are other hilltop castles which have been built on exposed rock formations: to the east is Wildenfels Castle and the burgstall of Strahlenfels Castle, to the northeast are the ruins of Stierberg Castle, to the north are Egloffstein Castle and the ruins of Wolfsberg Castle.

== Architecture ==
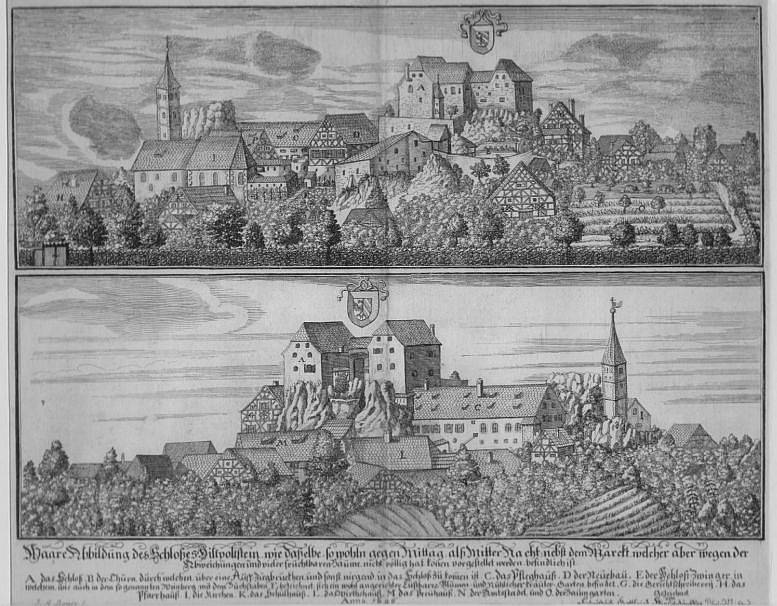
Copper plate by Johann Alexander Böner, 1696

Below the castle, on a plateau, is the pfleger mansion from the early 17th century (north wing, Am Schlosshof 4), which housed the offices and courtrooms of the Hiltpoltstein Pflegamt until 1806. The inner courtyard is reached via the archway of the pfleger castle. Here there is a second, east, wing in front of the castle rock. This 'modern' building (cf. copper plate by Johann Alexander Böner) with its southwards-oriented gable was added in the second half of the 17th century, it was here on the upper storey that the pfleger had his residence. The house opposite, with a gable roof, dates to the 17th century (Am Schlosshof 6) and was first described, erroneously, as the Neues Schloss ("New Palace") on a copper plate by Christoph Melchior Roth. This name was, however, constantly used by locals to refer to the pfleger house in contrast to the castle (the Altes Schloss or "Old Palace"). To the southwest the courtyard was bounded by a low extension off the chancel to St. Matthew's Church, and, even on the copper plates by Johann Alexander Böner of 1696 and 1699, a surrounding wall can be made out east of the church. Thanks to this enclosing wall, this courtyard was used by the village population as a fortification during the course of several sieges in the Thirty Years' War. Since the 19th century, a small house has stood on the southern side of the courtyard (Am Schlosshof 8).

The only approach to the castle runs through the gateway in the 'new' pfleger house. A passageway, which has several embrasures and smoke exhaust holes facing south, runs on the right hand side on the level to the stables. The building to the south with the hip roof was last remodelled in 1712 as the date over the entrance indicates. The hall was also used to stable coaches and is appropriately decorated with a cross vaulted ceiling and surrounding ornamentation. The beginning of the ascent to the castle which is in the same direction, leads up to a terrace at the top of the first flight of steps. From here there is a descent to a rather, lower terrace with the zwinger, whilst the route to the castle continues to the left up a further flight of steps.

The hilltop castle may only be accessed via a hexagonal staircase tower, which was built in 1595. A spiral staircase with 35 steps opens onto a wooden footbridge to the castle at the point where, until about 1800, there was a drawbridge. The present fixed wooden bridge was built following a survey in 1807, in order to enable the villagers to get to the cistern in the cellar of the south wing.

The three-winged castle has an open north side, the gable ends of the east and west wings flanking a courtyard. The south wing, together with the other two wings, forms a continuous outer wall. Up to what height the Hohenstaufen foundation walls have survived has not so far been investigated. The cross vaulting of the old castle chapel in the south wing and level with the courtyard, indicates that this part of the castle was extended in the 15th century. The vaulting covers the passageway from the staircase tower into the courtyard and the present chapel, reduced in size by an internal dividing wall.

A 1553 survey report mentions three cabinets in the castle. The present appearance of the east and west wings with their typical half-hipped roofs dates to around 1595. Since then their interiors have been altered several times, for example, in 1728 the floral paintings of the hall in the east wing were executed.

In the courtyard, which opens to the north, are the foundations of the octagonal bergfried with a diameter of roughly 9.30 metres. This partially collapsed in 1611 when it was hit by lightning and was then reduced to the height of the first floor together with its link to the east wing. The remaining, initially single-storey stump of the bergfried is recorded in a pen-and-ink drawing made during the Thirty Years' War. Later it continued to decay. The remaining wall stones of the tower were rebuilt to a height of about a metre during its renovation in the 1960s. A roughly metre-high shaft in the courtyard, below the eaves between the south and west wings serves to collect rainwater and feed it into the cistern which is formed by a large cavern in the castle rock. The 1807 construction survey report mentions that this cistern was still important as a supply of drinking water around 1800. When the castle fell into ruins in the first half of the 19th century, the cistern became filled with rubble which has still not been cleared out.

== History ==
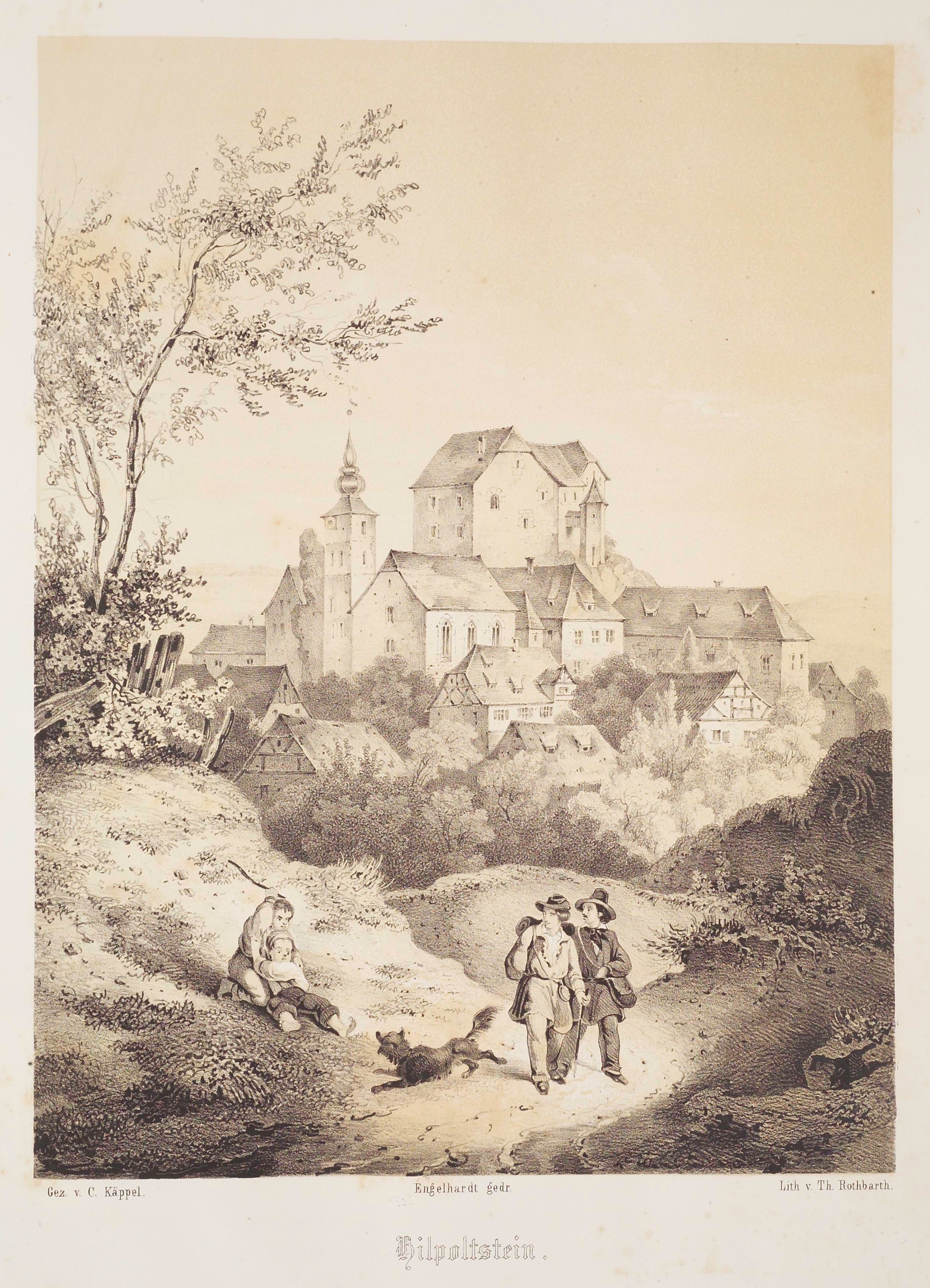
Market town and castle of Hiltpoltstein, lithograph (c. 1840) by Theodor Rothbarth based on a drawing by Carl Käppel

=== Archaeology and architectural research ===
Nothing is known about any settlement on the castle rock in pre-mediaeval times. During the renovation of the castle at the end of the 1960s, a late Ottonian disc fibula made of bronze was discovered; its style dating to the end of the 10th century or first quarter of the 11th century. There is a high probability that it originated from the workshop of Egbert of Trier. Because the ornamentation of fibulas soon fell out of fashion with the advent of the Salian dynasty, it was probably lost on the plateau of the zwinger prior to 1030. The brooch is displayed today in the Franconian Switzerland Museum in Tüchersfeld and is the oldest find from the castle hill. Although it is plausible that the castle rock was thus used as early as the early 11th century, no predecessor structures or remains of last Ottonian or Salian foundation walls have been found. What is certain is that the earliest record of the fortress occurred during the Hohenstaufen era, in an 1139 deed. Architectural and radiometric investigations of the foundation walls have not been carried out in sufficient detail to be able to date the castle more precisely than the sparse written records have indicated. Thousands of pieces of pottery, uncovered during the renovation of the castle in the 1960s in the courtyard and in the ground layers of the zwinger, date mainly to the Late Middle Ages (c. 1250 to 1500); older shards of pottery are the exception. The majority of surviving pottery pieces date to the period of the establishment of the Nuremberg pfleger office in the 16th century. A selection of these finds is displayed in a glass cabinet in the east wing of the castle.

=== High and Late Middle Ages (11th–14th centuries) ===
The first record of the castle and village of Hiltpoltstein appears in connexion with Weißenohe Abbey, founded in 1100, when the castle is reported as the seat of the associated Vogt. An authentic transcript of the privilege of Pope Paschal II to Weißenohe Abbey from the year 1109 is housed in the Bavarian State Library in Munich. Two transcripts, dating to around 1150, in the archives of Bamberg and Amberg, by contrast, contain not only the text of the Papal Bull, but also a list of all monastic estates, including Hilteboldesdorf cum castro (Hiltpoltstein and castle). These properties were apparently not added until the preparation of the transcripts. The document in Amberg also contains a copied signature of the pope as well as a real papal seal. In spite of the deliberate backdating of the Weißenohe estates in these two examples, it may be assumed that the expansion of Hiltpoltstein Castle as a likely vogt seat occurred at the same time as the abbey was founded.

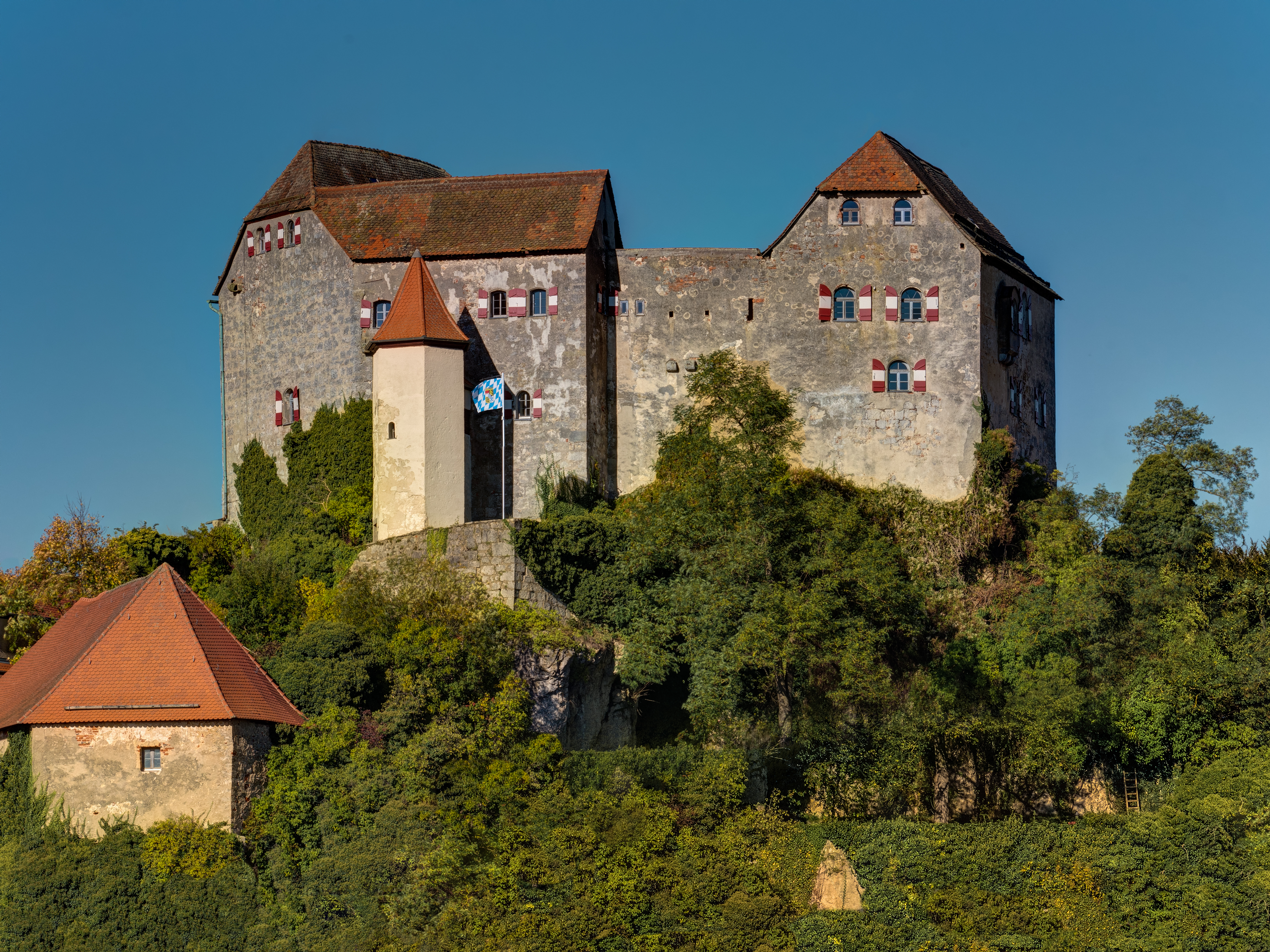

The imperial ministerialis family of Hiltpoltstein-Rothenberg is first recorded in 1139 as Odalricus quidam de Hilteboldestein ("Ulrich of Hiltpoltstein") in a document from Bamberg's Michelsberg Abbey. In connexion with this name, the castle rock (the "Stein") (the "stone") is also confirmed as the seat of his office. In documents originating in the period between 1246 and 1276, a ministerialis called Hiltpold is named after the three associated lordly estates of Lauf (Wenzelschloss), the castle on the "Alter Rothenberg" hill and Hiltpoltstein. In 1251 he was called Hilteboldus de Hilteboldestein; in 1254, Hiltepoldus de Rotenberge. The "lead name" (Leitname), Hiltpold, was preserved throughout the Hohenstaufen period. After the execution of the last Hohenstaufen, Conradin, in 1268, the estate went to the Bavarian Duke Louis the Strict of the House of Wittelsbach. The family of the castellans of Hiltpoltstein-Rothenberg finally emerged at the end of the 13th century with the marriage of the last Hiltpold to Dietrich of Wildenstein. The old castle of Rothenberg, which had meanwhile become the seat of the Wildensteins, was intervisible with Hiltpoltstein Castle. It was abandoned in the first third of the 14th century in favour of the new fortification on the Rothenberg near Schnaittach.

When it was abandoned as the family seat at the end of the 13th century, for several decades, trances of the castellans of Hiltpoltstein disappeared from the records. It is likely, however, that it became a common fief with the nearby Winterstein Castle as the same lead name of Neidung is used in connexion with both castles. For example, in 1305, a Nendunch von Hilpolstein is mentioned; in 1326 a Neydungk von Winterstein. When in 1329, Emperor, Louis the Bavarian, on inheriting from his brother, divided the estate of Wittelsbach in the Treaty of Pavia, Hiltpoltstein went to Count Palatine Rupert and, thus to the Electorate of the Palatinate (until then Nordgau, later Upper Palatinate).

=== Under Bohemian rule (1353–1503) ===
On 29 October 1353 a deed of sale for over 12,000 marks of silver was concluded between the financially straitened Count Palatine Rupert and the Bohemian king and later Roman-German emperor, Charles IV, according to which Hiltpoltstein, along with Sulzbach, Rosenberg, Hartenstein, Neidstein, Thurndorf, Hohenstein, Lichteneck, Lauf, Eschenbach, Hersbruck, Auerbach, Velden, Pegnitz and Plech were sold to the Kingdom of Bohemia. Under Bohemian ownership a Pflegamt with high judicial court was established at the castle, which was initially subordinated to the administrative seat of Sulzbach and then, from 1373, the Landgericht of Auerbach. Next to Erlangen Hiltpoltstein was thus in the second half of the 14th century one of the northwesternmost outposts of the territory known as New Bohemia. The village was recorded in the Bohemian Urbarium (Böhmisches Salbuch) of 1366/68 as Hilpoldstein.

Charles IV's successor, King Wenceslas enfeoffed the castle in 1397 to the Bohemian mining managers, Herdegen and Peter Valzner. These wealthy brothers were elevated in 1403 to the status of Nuremberg patricians. The fee was 1,000 Schock Groschen Prager Münze, in addition 400 guilders were pledged for the extension of the castle. Even after the widespread loss of Neo-Bohemian territories around 1400 to the Electorate of the Palatinate, Hiltpoltstein remained under Bohemian sovereignty and Bohemian kings. Frederick of Seckendorff, a representative of Frankish knighthood, was enfeoffed with the village and castle through his marriage to Regina Valzner, daughter of Peter Valzner, in 1408, who gave the estate as part of her marriage dowry In 1417, Septendorff was given market rights and the privilege to build town defences by King Sigismund. The estate was inherited in 1432 by his son, Frederick, called Ernfried of Seckendorff, who was the guardian of his younger brother Hans von Seckendorff. The Seckendorffs lived in Nuremberg and appointed vogts there. A number of court rulings indicate that Hans von Seckendorff held the office of Landrichter ("state judge") in Nuremberg from 1454 to 1455. In 1460 he again handed over the enfeoffed estate to his brother, Frederick. His son, Frederick, inherited the castle in 1483.

=== Imperial city period (1503–1806) ===
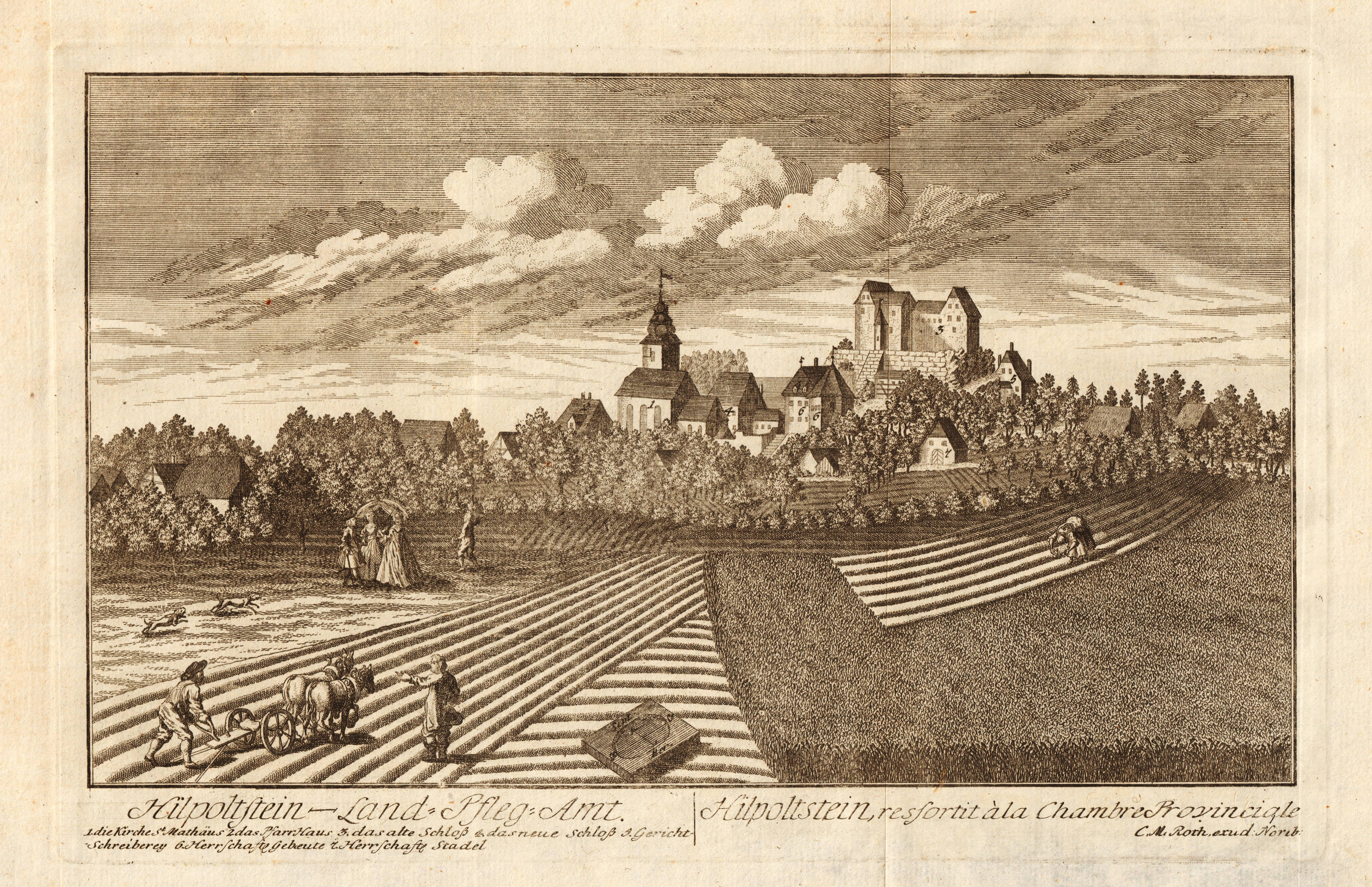
Copper plate by Christoph Melchior Roth, 1760

With great prescience prior to the Bavaria-Palatine succession conflict, Puotha of Riesenberg, the most senior state judge (Landrichter) in the Kingdom of Bohemia, enfeoffed the castle in June 1503 on orders from King Vladislaus II for 3,600 Rhenish guilders to Fritz of Seckendorff. At the same time, he entered into negotiations with the Imperial City of Nuremberg, which was interested in acquiring Hiltpoltstein in order to rationalise its territory. Unlike Palatinate villages such as Hersbruck, Lauf and Altdorf, which were conquered by or surrendered to Nuremberg during the imminent War of the Succession of Landshut, Hiltpoltstein had to be acquired by Pfandbrief, a deed of fief. This was issued on St. Gall's Day in 1503 at Raudnitz, its price amounted to 6,000 Rhenish guilders. The castle became the seat of a Nuremberg pfleger, but remained formally under Bohemian sovereignty, including the right of access by the King of Bohemia and the possible redemption of the Pfandbrief at any time. The imperial city was interested in this strategically important office despite its freely revocable possession: on St. Vitus' Day in 1509 King Vladislaus of Bohemia and Hungary raised the value of the Pfandbriefe by a further 2,000 florins, since Nuremberg had invested this sum in the expansion of the castle site. The Pflegeramt was established in 1513 and the pflegers, appointed by Nuremberg and resident in the castle, sent annual reports back to the imperial city. In the period 1530–1531, there are reports of repairs being carried out. However, there is disagreement about whether and to what extent the castle was damaged during the Second Margrave War. On 21 May 1552, the castle was captured by the margravial field commander (Kriegshauptmann), William of Stein and, four weeks later, retaken by troops of the imperial city under Martin Schrimpf. The castle was probably ravaged by fire in May or June 1553 and this may well have been part of the numerous attacks on castles by peasants in the area around Nuremberg during this period. Official bills indicate that the castle was not being used again until the 1560s. During excavations of rubble at the end of the 1960s by the then castle owner, Josef Weber, a layer of burnt material was discovered that has been associated with the Second Margrave War. The documentation, however, does not meet archaeological standards; for example, no 14C dating was done. Other authors doubt these attacks on the castle during the peasant unrest and date the burning to the time of the margravial war. In 1560 a treaty was signed between Emperor Ferdinand I, who was also King of Bohemia, and the Nuremberg City Council, that extended the enfeoffment of the castle estate to the imperial city for a further 25 years in return for a payment of 1,500 talers. In 1624, Emperor Ferdinand II devolved Nuremberg's Hiltpoltstein fief to Bohemia.

In 1774, architect and former archaeologist, Carl Haller von Hallerstein, was born in the castle, the son of the then pfleger. In a short biographical interlude as Nuremberg's Building Inspector (Bauinspektor) he published in 1807 a report on the structural condition of Hiltpoltstein Castle.

=== Recent history (since 1806) ===
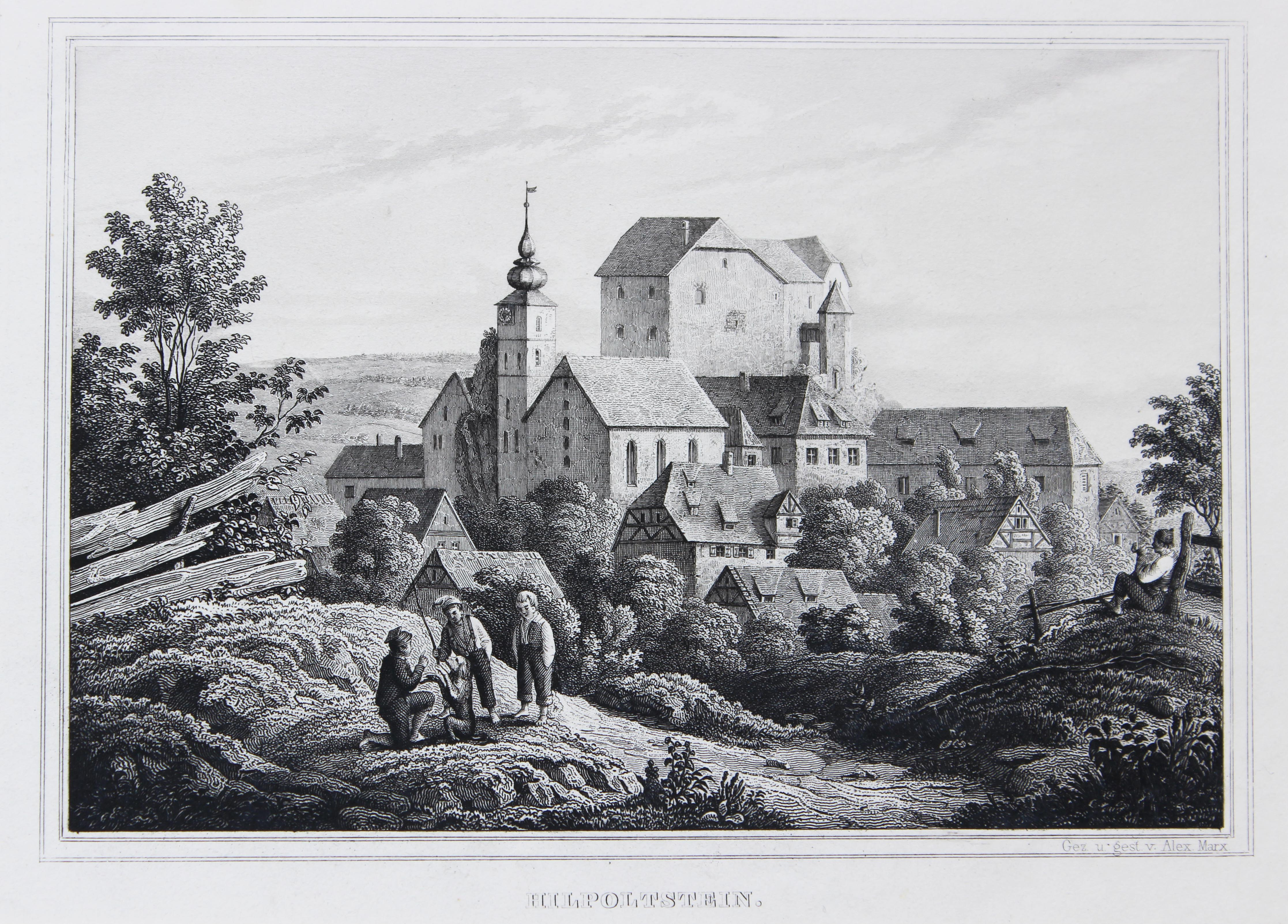
Hiltpoltstein (1843 steel engraving by Alex Marx)

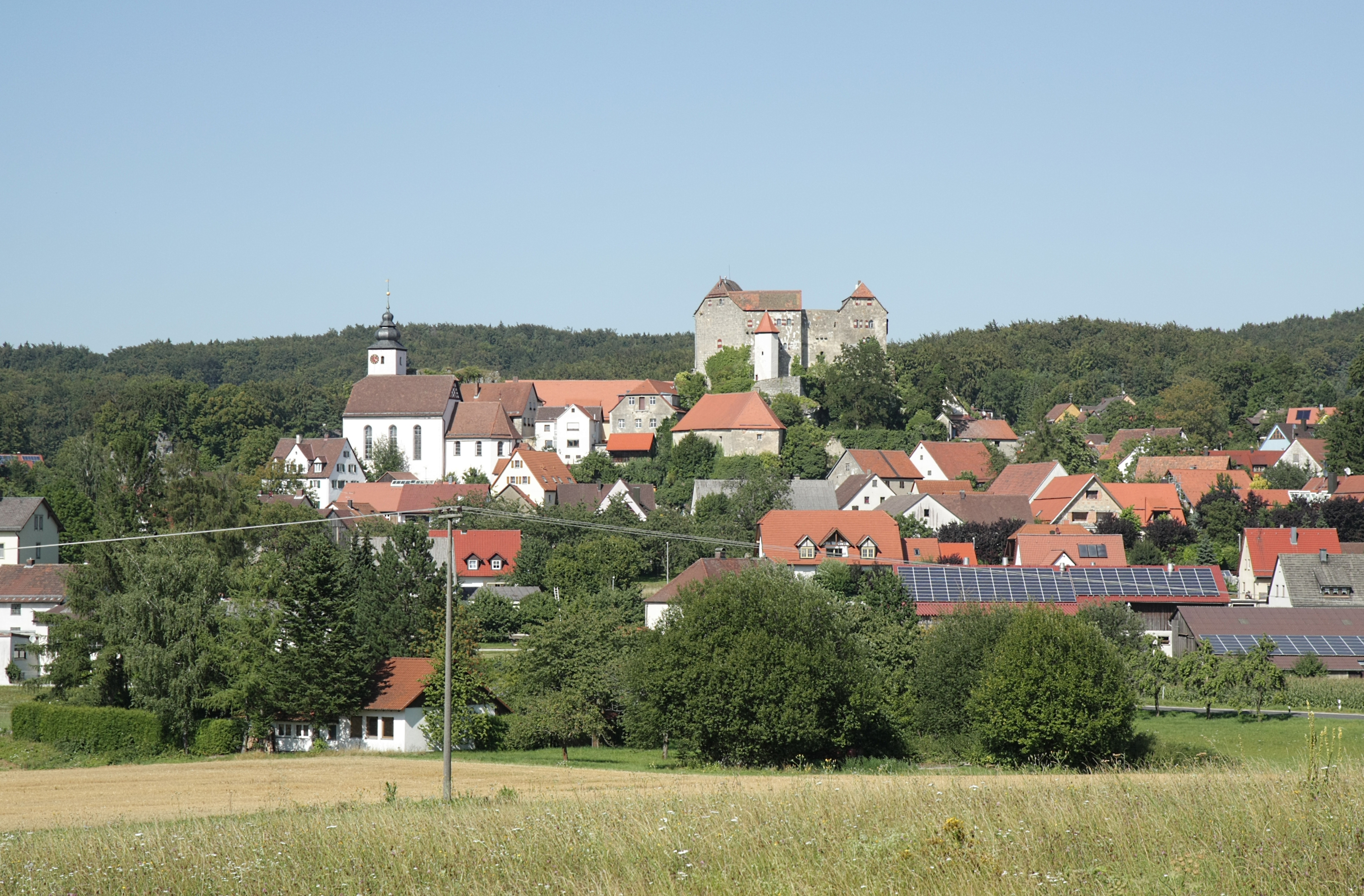
View of the market and castle of Hiltpoltstein from the SW

In 1806 Hiltpoltstein was incorporated into the Kingdom of Bavaria. From 1808 to 1810 it was part of the Landgericht of Gräfenberg in the county of Pegnitzkreis; from 1810 in the county of Rezatkreis and from 1817 in the county of Obermainkreis.

The new Landgerichte replaced the former Pflegämter and the pfleger castle of Hiltpoltstein was vacated at the end of 1807 as an administrative office. The castle and mansion were initially sold to a local master bricklayer (Maurermeister); later, it was acquired by the publican, Georg Schmidt. As a result of a lack of investment, the castle meanwhile became completely derelict; even entire roofs were missing. In 1841 the dreadfully neglected castle was depicted in the Korrespondent von und für Deutschland as ripe for demolition, something that was only prevented by the personal intervention of King Ludwig. After its return to royal Bavarian ownership in 1843 it was repaired at the expense of the state and then became the head office of the local forestry commission. In the second half of the 19th century Hiltpoltstein benefited from the rise in "castle romanticism" and received many foreign visitors, something that is recorded in a castle guest book running without a break from 1843 to 1965 and which is now in private hands in Hiltpoltstein.

The castle is historic monument no. D-4-74-138-6 in the Bavarian list of Monuments, the pfleger castle is D-4-74-138-3. The centre of the village of Hiltpoltstein is protected as "historic ensemble" (Denkmalensemble) E-4-74-138-1, the whole castle area with its underground structures is area monument (Bodendenkmal) D-4-6333-0217. In the 1960s, the Free State of Bavaria was interested in divesting itself of the castle as state property for reasons of cost. In 1966 it was sold for DM 81,500 to Nuremberg businessman, Josef Weber. He carried out extensive renovation that lasted until 1972, such as the uncovering and reinforcement of the foundations of bergfried, the restorations of the large hall and the cabinet in the east wing and the chapel in the south wing. He also cleared the cellars of metre-thick rubble.

Since the 1970s the castle and pfleger mansion has changed hands several times without major changes to its structural condition. Following the bankruptcy of the owner in 2006 the castle was managed by the receiver. The Society for the Preservation of Hiltpoltstein Castle (Förderverein zum Erhalt der Burg Hiltpoltstein e. V.) operated monthly guided tours between 2010 and 2013. In the upper floor of the pfleger mansion the society runs a café and organises exhibitions of local artists. In 2013 the castle and pflegschloss were sold to a private owner again for €400,000. Since then, there has been no public access. In 2013 and 2014 the castle was only open on the Tag des offenen Denkmals. In November 2016 a further sale was announced to a new private owner who intended to use it as a holiday home.

== Literature ==
- Volker Alberti: Burg Hiltpoltstein: Wahrzeichen der südlichen Fränkischen Schweiz. Puk Print, Hiltpoltstein, 2009, ISBN 978-3-00-027427-5.
- Toni Eckert, Susanne Fischer, Renate Freitag, Rainer Hofmann, Walter Tausendpfund: Die Burgen der Fränkischen Schweiz: Ein Kulturführer. Gebietsausschuss Fränkische Schweiz, Forchheim o. J., ISBN 3-9803276-5-5, pp. 68–70.
- Ruth Bach-Damaskinos, Peter Borowitz: Schlösser und Burgen in Oberfranken – Eine vollständige Darstellung aller Schlösser, Herrensitze, Burgen und Ruinen in den oberfränkischen kreisfreien Städten und Landkreisen. Verlag A. Hofmann, Nuremberg, 1996, ISBN 3-87191-212-3, p. 154.
- Robert Giersch, Andreas Schlunk, Berthold von Haller: Burgen und Herrensitze in der Nürnberger Landschaft - Ein historisches Handbuch nach Vorarbeiten von Dr. Gustav Voit. Selbstverlag der Altnürnberger Landschaft e. V., Lauf an der Pegnitz, 2006, ISBN 978-3-00-020677-1, pp. 195–198.
- Wolfgang Hühnermann: Amt und Burg Hiltpoltstein. – In: Heimatbilder aus Oberfranken, 1916, pp. 106–114
- Hellmut Kunstmann: Die Burgen der westlichen und nördlichen Fränkischen Schweiz. 1. Teil: Der Südwesten, unteres Wiesenthal und Trubachtal. Veröffentlichungen der Gesellschaft für fränkische Geschichte, Reihe IX, Nuremberg, 1971.
- Gustav Voit, Walter Rüfer: Eine Burgenreise durch die Fränkische Schweiz. Verlag Palm & Enke, Erlangen, 1991, ISBN 3-7896-0064-4, pp. 86–89.
- Friedrich Weiß: Die Ritterburg Hildpoldstein in den oberfränkischen Umgebungen von Muggendorf. Nuremberg, 1844.
