= Schlossberg Castle =

Schlossberg Castle may refer to the following:

Castles in Austria

- Schloßberg (Moosbach), ruined castle near Moosbach in the Innviertel, Upper Austria
- Schlossberg Castle (Seefeld in Tirol), in Innsbruck Land, Tyrol

Castles in Germany

- Schloßberg Castle (Dettingen), ruined castle near Dettingen in the county of Esslingen, Baden-Württemberg
- Schlossberg Castle (Gablingen), ruined castle in Germany
- Schlossberg Castle (Gauting), ruined castle in Germany
- Lohra Castle, ruined castle in Großlohra in the county of Nordhausen in Thuringia
- Schlossberg Castle (Haidhof), ruined castle near Egloffstein in the Upper Franconian county of Forchheim in Bavaria
- Schlossberg Castle (Heggbach), ruined castle in der Gemeinde Laupheim in the county of Biberach, Baden-Württemberg
- Schlossberg Castle (Kümmersreuth), ruined castle near Bad Staffelstein in the county of Lichtenfels, Bavaria
- Habsberg Castle, also called Schlossberg Castle, ruined castle in the municipality of Langenenslingen in the county of Biberach in Baden-Württemberg
- Schlossberg Castle (Uttenweiler), ruined castle in der municipality of Uttenweiler in the county of Biberach, Baden-Württemberg

Castles elsewhere in Europe

- Kamenický hrad, Gothic castle on a hill called, in German, the Schlossberg, in the Bohemian Central Highlands, Czech Republic
- Schlossberg Castle (La Neuveville), above the small town of La Neuveville, canton of Berne, Switzerland

== See also ==
- Schlossberg (disambiguation)
