= Burley, Hampshire =

Village and parish in Hampshire, England

Coordinates: 50.827271°N 1.699937°W

Burley
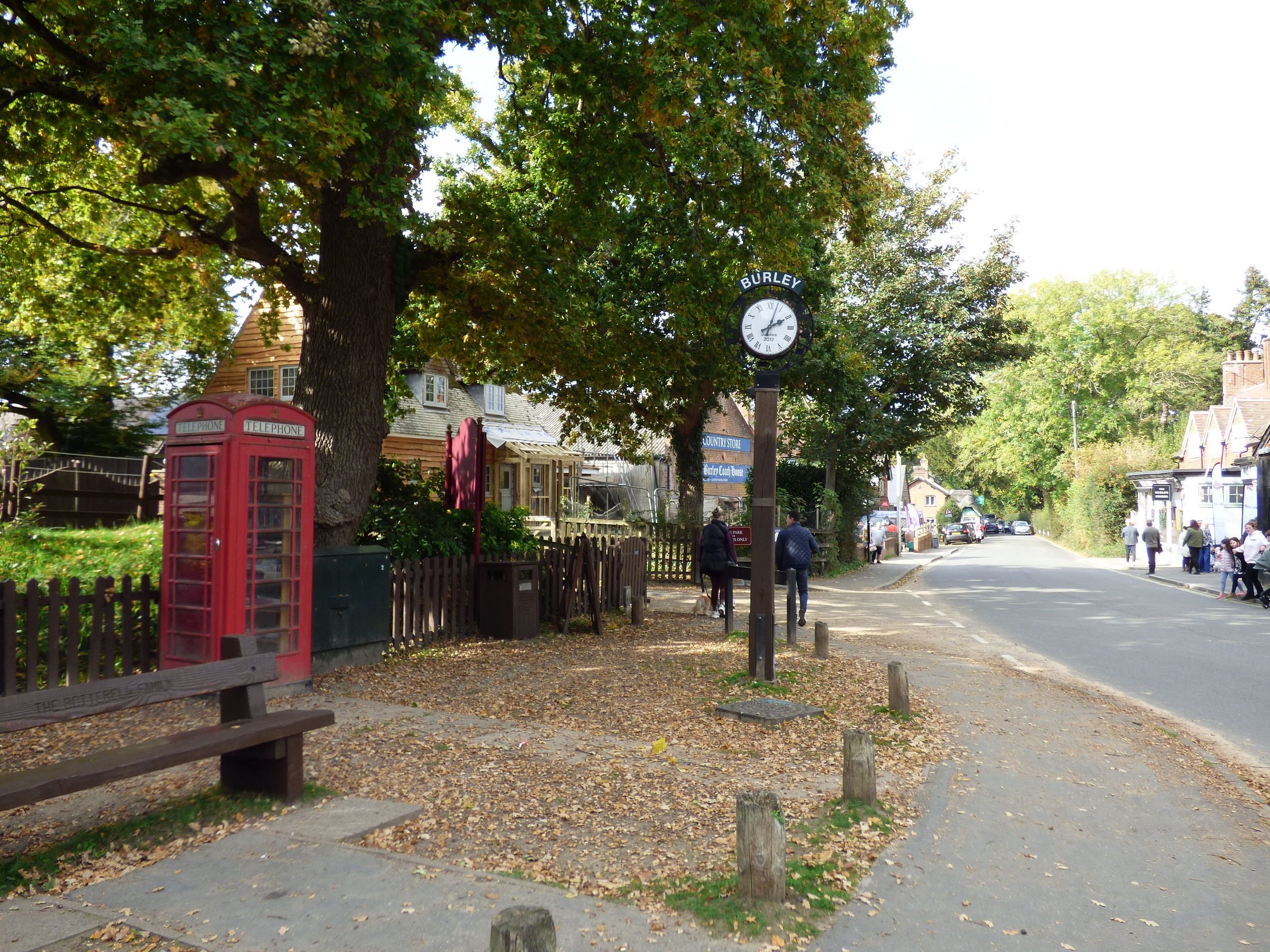
- Burley, village centre

- Location within Hampshire
- Population: 1,350; 1,384 (2011 Census including Picket Post)
- OS grid reference: SU2123003124
- District: New Forest
- Shire county: Hampshire
- Region: South East
- Country: England
- Sovereign state: United Kingdom
- Post town: RINGWOOD
- Postcode district: BH24
- Dialling code: 01425
- Police: Hampshire and Isle of Wight
- Fire: Hampshire and Isle of Wight
- Ambulance: South Central
- UK Parliament: New Forest West
- Website: Burley village

Burley is a village and civil parish in the New Forest, Hampshire, England. It has ancient origins and is now somewhat tourist-oriented.

== The village ==
Burley is located towards the western edge of the New Forest, 4 miles (6 km) south-east of the town of Ringwood. The village is fairly scattered, and apart from the village centre, there is Burley Street to the north; Bisterne Close to the east; and the Mill Lawn area to the north-east. Burley has a post office, newsagents, butcher's shop, and village stores, as well as tea rooms, a Hippy/festival clothing shop, antique shops, art galleries and gift shops, pubs and a large Cycle Shop and Cycle Hire centre. The village still practises the old tradition of commoning, allowing animals to graze on the open Forest, and ponies and cattle roam freely around the village. Burley is home to a football club and a cricket club. Burley Golf Club can be found to the southeast of the village.

The village is surrounded by the open heathland of the New Forest, containing a complex of woodland, heathland and acid grassland, shrub and valley bog, supporting a richness and diversity of wildlife. Burley is twinned with Beurlay, Charente-Maritime, France. Burley Fire Station is thought to be the only fire station in the country with a cattle grid at the entrance.

== History ==
People have lived in the Burley area since prehistoric times. At least 23 Bronze Age barrows are known in the Burley area. The site of an Iron Age hillfort can be seen just to the west of the village at Castle Hill.

There is evidence of Saxon occupation as the name Burley is composed of two Saxon words 'burgh', which means fortified palace, and 'leah', which means an open meadow or clearing in a wood.

Burley is not specifically mentioned in the Domesday Book of 1086, but the entry for nearby Ringwood may well refer to Burley when it mentions lands in the forest with "14 villagers and 6 smallholders with 7 ploughs; a mill at 30d; and woodland at 189 pigs from pasturage."

Burley was part of the royal lands of the New Forest. By the beginning of the 13th century the family of de Burley was firmly established here. Richard de Burley held the estate from Edward I who gave the village of Burley and Manor of Lyndhurst as dowry to his second wife Margaret, sister of Philip IV of France. The manor is said to have belonged to the Crown down to the time of James I.

There was a watermill belonging to the manor of Burley, which ceased operating around 1820. The mill is commemorated in names of Mill Lawn and Mill Lawn Brook, but the only building which survives is the grist house in the grounds of Mill Cottage.

The first known church in Burley was the Calvinistic Burley Chapel erected in 1789. The ecclesiastical parish of Burley was formed in 1840 out of Ringwood., this was served by the Anglican church of John the Baptist which was built in 1839 and added to in 1886–7. A school was built in Burley in 1854 large enough to accommodate 120 children.

In 1852 the manor passed into the possession of Colonel Esdaile who pulled down the old manor house and built a new one. Further changes to the building have been made since that time, and the manor house is now a hotel.

2 miles (3 km) to the north-east of the Burley village lies Burley Lodge, whose history dates back to the 15th century. It was part of the lands of the "bailiwick of Burley" which was held in the 18th century by the Paulets, Dukes of Bolton and Marquesses of Winchester.

The civil parish of Burley was formed in 1868 from Burley Walk and Holmsley Walk, extra-parochial parts of the New Forest, together with the ancient vill of Burley. From 1847 to 1964, Burley was served by trains at nearby Holmsley railway station, about 1.5 miles (2.4 km) southeast of the village. The station buildings still stand, and are now tea rooms.

Arthur Clough (son of Arthur Hugh Clough) and his wife Eleanor Freshfield built Castletop House on Castle Hill Lane in 1898: Eleanor's father Douglas Freshfield was President of the Royal Geographical Society and brought back many exotic plants from his travels which were planted at Castletop.

Burley has a long connection with witches; in the late 1950s, Sybil Leek, a self-styled white witch, lived in the village. She could be seen walking around Burley with her pet jackdaw on her shoulder before she moved to America. Some of the gift shops in Burley now sell witch-related gifts and ornaments.

Burley was also once a favourite haunt for smugglers, and a secret cellar in the Queens Head pub was discovered during renovation work, where pistols, coins, and other unusual items were discovered.

== The Bisterne Dragon ==
Burley is notable in English folklore for the supposed location of a dragon's lair at Burley Beacon, just outside the village. There are several versions of the tale, one being that the creature "flew" every morning to Bisterne, where it would be supplied with milk. To kill the dragon, a valiant knight (usually named Berkeley) built a hide, and with two dogs lay in wait. The creature came as usual one morning for its milk, and when the hut door was opened the dogs attacked it, and while thus engaged the knight took the dragon by surprise, the dogs dying in the affray. The fight raged throughout the forest, with the dragon finally dying outside Lyndhurst, its corpse turning into a great hill (now known as Boltons Bench). Though the knight had defeated the dragon he had been mentally broken by the battle, and after thirty days and thirty nights he went back to Boltons Bench to die alone atop it, his body turning into the yew tree which can still be seen today.
