= Hiltpoltstein =

- Municipality
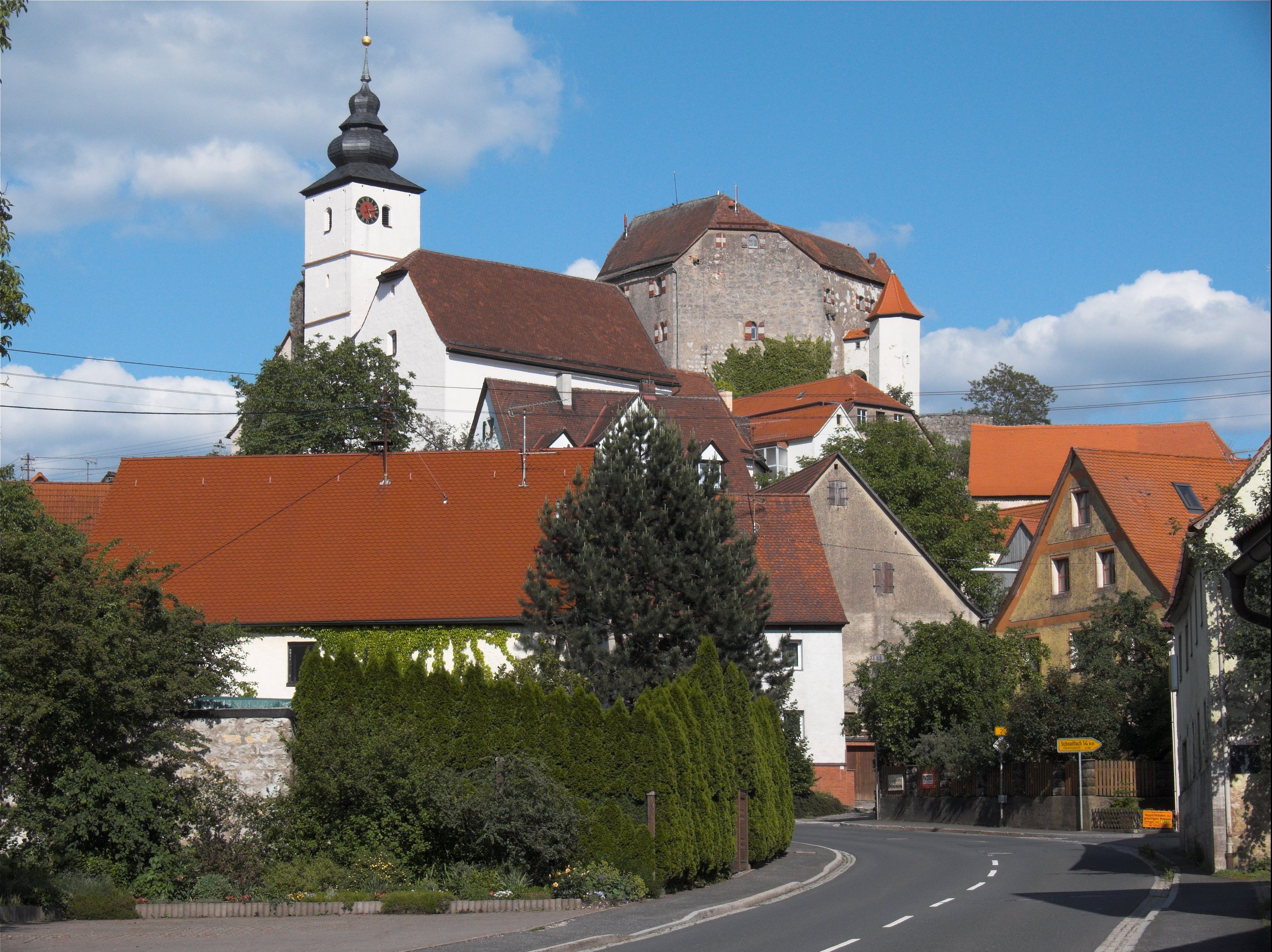
- Saint Matthew Church and Hiltpoltstein Castle

- Coat of arms

- Location of Hiltpoltstein within Forchheim district
- Interactive map of Hiltpoltstein
- Location within Germany Location within Bavaria
- Coordinates: 49°39′36″N 11°19′15″E
- Country: Germany
- State: Bavaria
- Admin. region: Oberfranken
- District: Forchheim
- Municipal assoc.: Gräfenberg
- Subdivisions: 10 Ortsteile

Government
  - Mayor (2020–26): Gisela Schulze-Bauer

Area
  - Total: 25.54 km^{2} (9.86 sq mi)
- Elevation: 518 m (1,699 ft)

Population (2025-12-31)
  - Total: 1,486
  - Density: 58.18/km^{2} (150.7/sq mi)
- Time zone: UTC+01:00 (CET)
  - Summer (DST): UTC+02:00 (CEST)
- Postal codes: 91355
- Dialling codes: 09192
- Vehicle registration: FO
- Website: www.hiltpoltstein-online.de

Hiltpoltstein (German pronunciation: [ˈhɪltpɔltˌʃtaɪn]) is a market village in the district of Forchheim in Bavaria in Germany. At its centre is Hiltpoltstein Castle.
