= Zamkova Hora =

Zamkova Hora (Ukrainian: Замкова Гора) may refer to:

- Zamkova Hora (Kyiv), a historical landmark in the center of Kyiv, Ukraine.
- Zamkova Hora (Lviv), a historic hill, on which a castle was once situated, in Lviv, Ukraine.

== See also ==
- Castle Mountain (disambiguation)
