= Castle on the Hill (disambiguation) =

"Castle on the Hill" is a 2017 song by Ed Sheeran.

Castle on the Hill or The Castle on the Hill may also refer to:

== Music ==
- "Castle on the Hill", a 1996 song by Ride from Tarantula

== Books ==
- Castle on the Hill, novel by W. E. D. Ross (1968)
- The Castle on the Hill, novel by Elizabeth Goudge (1941)

== Buildings ==
=== United States ===
- Baltimore City College, Baltimore, Maryland
- Fairhaven High School and Academy, Fairhaven, Massachusetts
- The High School of Music & Art, a former school in New York City, now the A. Philip Randolph Campus High School
- Hillcrest Lutheran Academy, Fergus Falls, Minnesota
- Lincoln College Preparatory Academy, Kansas City, Missouri
- Monastery Immaculate Conception, Ferdinand Indian
- Northwestern Oklahoma State University, Alva, Oklahoma; the first building destroyed in a 1935 fire
- Reading High School (Reading, Pennsylvania), a high school in Reading, Pennsylvania
- Shelton-McMurphey-Johnson House, a Victorian-era residence in Eugene, Oregon
- Sioux City Central High School and Central Annex, Sioux City, Iowa
- Teaneck High School, Teaneck, New Jersey
- Castle on the Hill, a former water purification facility in Dansville, Livingston County, New York

=== Elsewhere ===
- Melbourne High School, a selective entry state high school for boys in the Melbourne suburb of South Yarra, Australia
- St Eunan's College, County Donegal, Ireland

== See also ==
- Castle Hill (disambiguation)
- Hill castle
