= Schloßberg (Pegnitz) =

Mountain in Germany

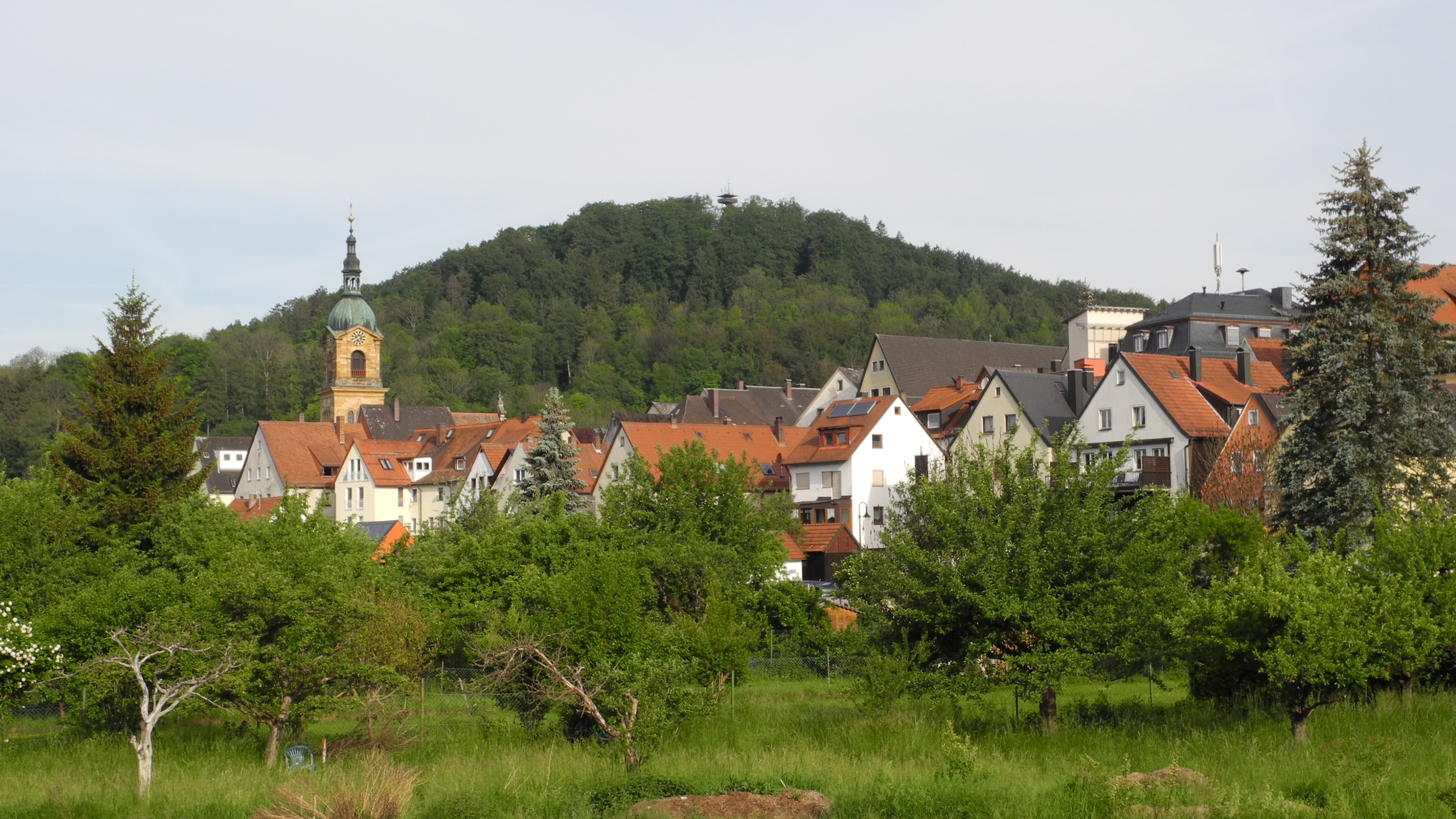

Highest point
- Elevation: 543 m (1,781 ft)
- Coordinates: 49°45′30″N 11°31′59″E

Geography
- Location within Germany
- Location: Pegnitz, Bavaria, Germany

Schloßberg is a mountain in the town of Pegnitz in Bavaria, Germany.
