= Castle Mountain (Pendleton County, West Virginia) =

Mountain ridge in West Virginia, United States

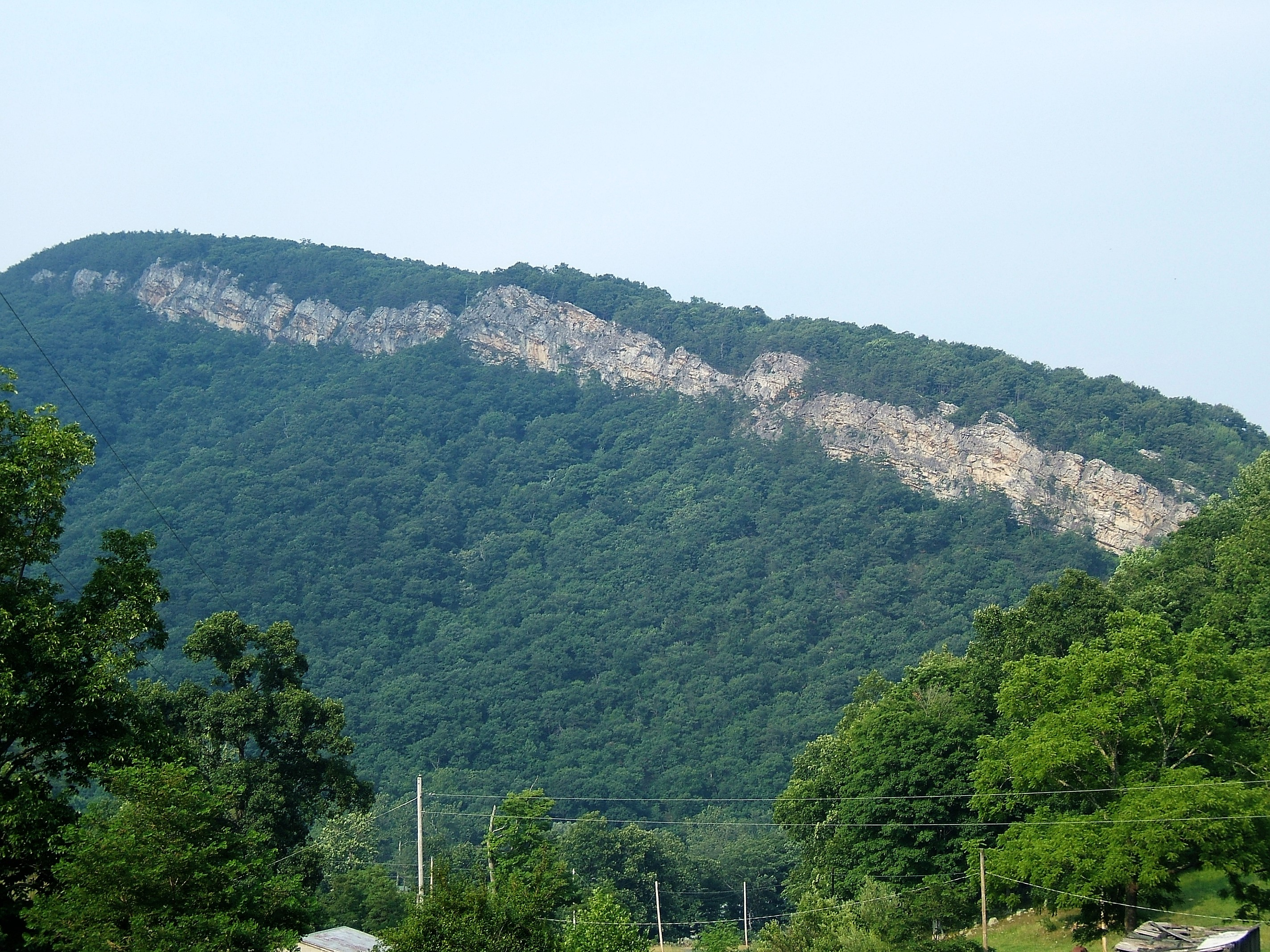

Highest point
- Elevation: 3,410 ft (1,040 m)
- Coordinates: 38°38′45″N 79°25′05″W

Geography
- Location within West Virginia
- Location: Pendleton County, West Virginia, U.S.
- Parent range: Ridge-and-Valley Appalachians
- Topo map: USGS Circleville

Climbing
- Easiest route: Hike

Castle Mountain is a forested mountain ridge in Pendleton County, West Virginia, in the United States. Running from the southwest to the northeast, the mountain is bounded to its west by North Fork Mountain and to its east by a series of rolling hills.
