= Spieser Schlossberg =

Mountain in Germany

Coordinates: 49°38′21″N 11°24′02″E

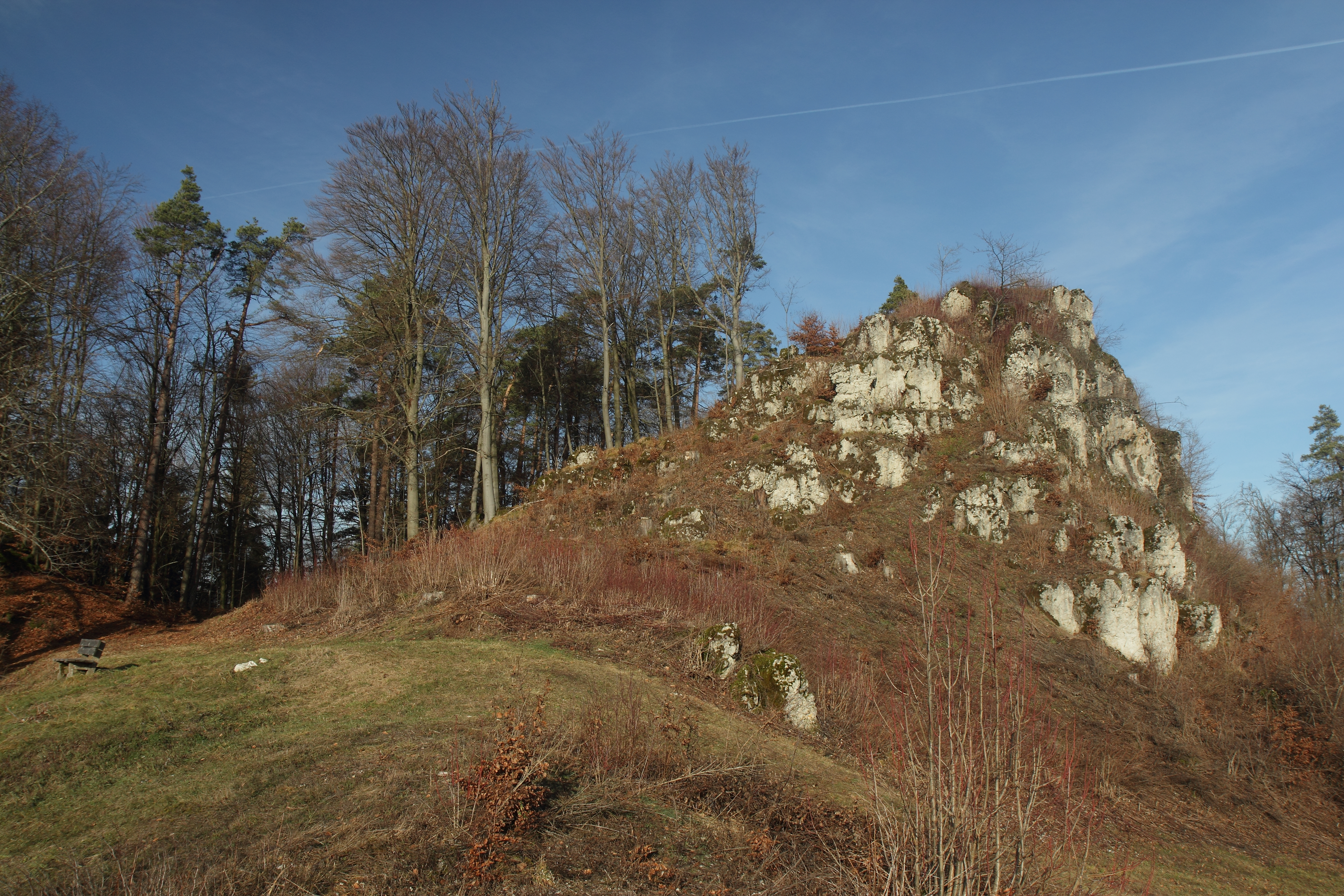

Highest point
- Elevation: 614.4 m (2,016 ft)

Geography
- Location: Bavaria, Germany

Spieser Schlossberg is a mountain of Bavaria, Germany.
