= Schlosberg =

Schlosberg is a surname. Notable people with the surname include:

- Carol Schlosberg (1957–1998), American painter
- David Schlosberg (born 1963), American political theorist
- Deia Schlosberg, American documentary filmmaker
- Harold H. Schlosberg (1904–1964), American psychologist
- Hilton Schlosberg (born 1952/53), British billionaire
- Lev Schlosberg (born 1963), Russian politician, activist and journalist
- Richard T. Schlosberg (born c. 1944), American businessman
- Rowan Schlosberg, British actor

== See also ==
- Schlossberg (surname)
