= Schlossberg Castle (La Neuveville) =

Castle in La Neuveville, Switzerland

- Schlossberg
- La Neuveville
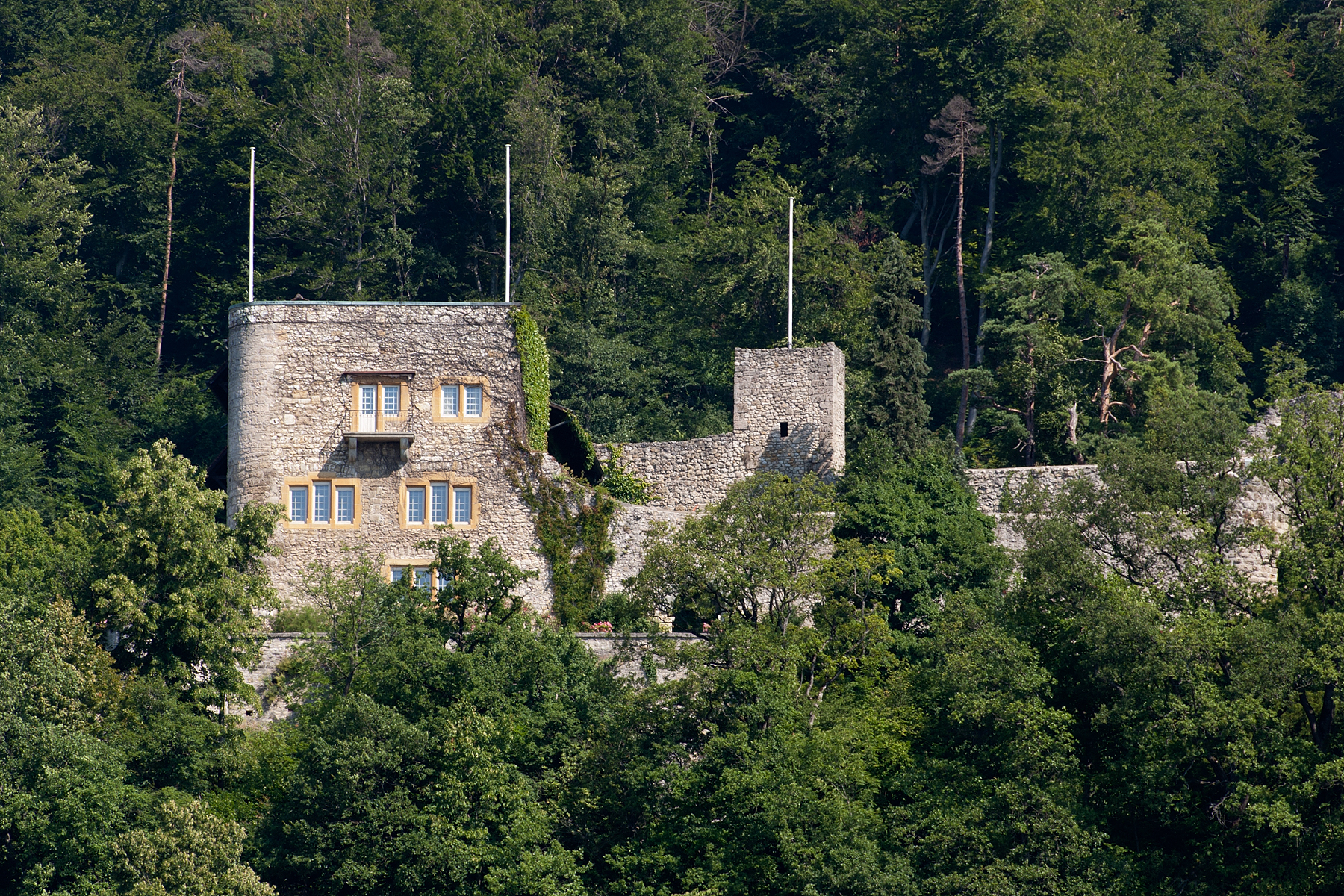
- Schlossberg Castle

Site information
- Owner: Privately owned
- Open to the public: Available to rent

Location
- Coordinates: 47.06630°N 7.08425°E

Site history
- Built: 1283-88
- Built by: Prince-Bishop Henry von Isny

Schlossberg Castle (German: Schlossberg) is a castle in the municipality of La Neuveville of the canton of Bern in Switzerland.

== History ==
In 999 the Abbot of Moutier-Grandval Abbey gave his extensive landholdings around Lake Biel, including where La Neuveville would be founded, to the Prince-Bishop of Basel. At that time the region was known as Nugerol and over the next centuries the Bishop of Basel and the Counts of Neuchâtel often quarreled over the land. In 1283 the Prince-Bishop Henry von Isny began to have Schlossberg Castle built on the slopes of the Jura Mountains. Construction finished up in 1288 under the next Prince-Bishop, Peter Reich von Reichenstein. The castle was intended to help defend his claim to the land. To further solidify his claims, around 1310, the next Prince-Bishop, Gérard de Vuippens, founded the town of La Neuveville. The town and castle pushed the borders of the County of Neuchâtel to the eastern side of the Ruz de Vaux stream.

The Bishops appointed castellans who were required to live in the castle and to defend it if attacked. After the town of La Neuveville was established, the castellan of the castle also governed the town.

In 1342, the Prince-Bishops signed a treaty with the Counts of Neuchâtel which established the border between their lands. With the treaty, Schlossberg lost much of its original strategic importance. In 1367 fighting broke out between the Prince-Bishop Johann von Vienne and the city of Bern. The Prince-Bishop fled to Schlossberg Castle ahead of a Bernese army. Bern then besieged the town of La Neuveville and the castle. The citizens of La Neuveville rallied around the Prince-Bishop and drove the Bernese army away. In response, the Prince-Bishop granted the town additional rights and privileges in 1368.

Starting in 1532, the castellan began living in the town and only visited the castle. About two decades later, in 1556, the castellan completely moved into town. The castle began to slowly fall into disrepair. In 1799, after the 1798 French invasion, the castle was sold by the French government to a private owner. It was repaired in 1884 by Charles-Louis Schnider-Gibollet and again in 1930-32 by Louis-Philippe Imer. Following the renovation, in 1933, Louis-Philippe gave the castle to the community of La Neuveville and the Canton of Bern. Today a foundation established by the community maintains the castle and rents portions out.

== See also ==
- List of castles in Switzerland
