= Schlossberg von Tettelham =

Mountain in Germany

Coordinates: 47°56′53″N 12°40′44″E

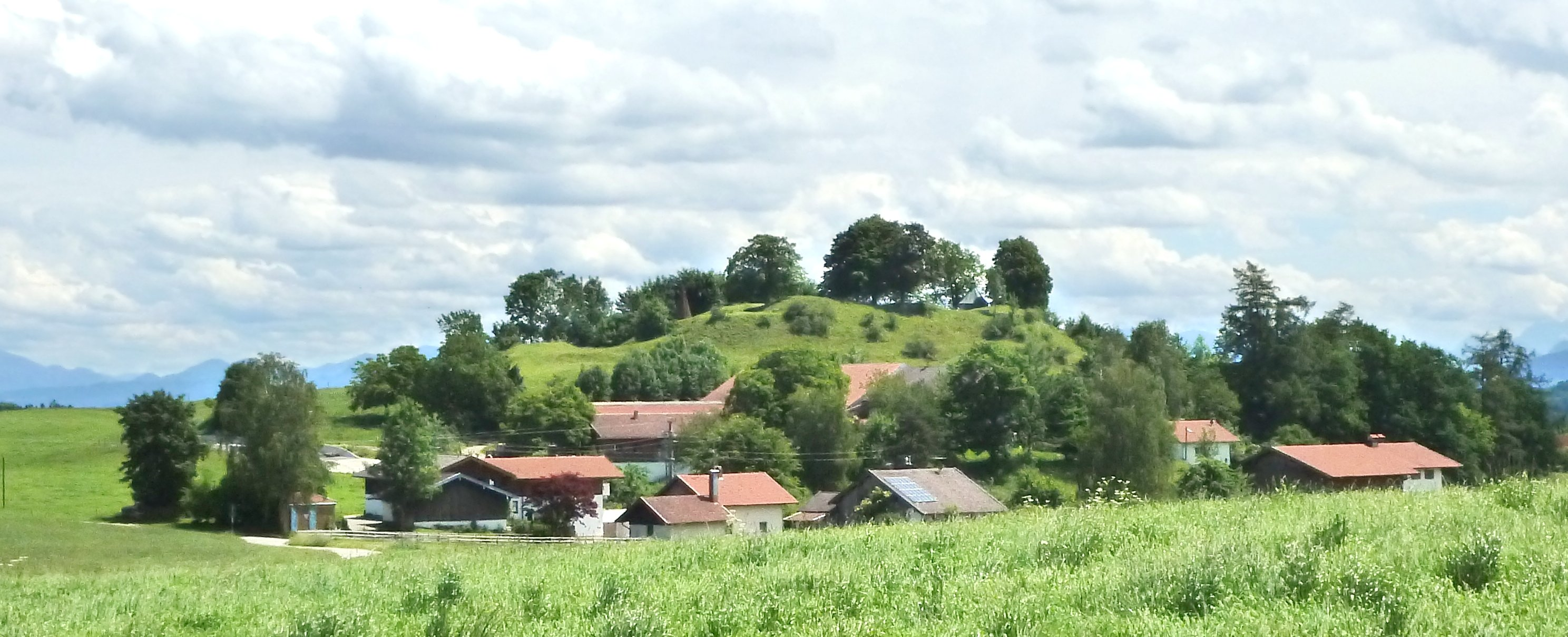
- Castle hill of Tettelham

Highest point
- Elevation: 597 m (1,959 ft)

Geography
- Location: Bavaria, Germany

Schlossberg von Tettelham is a 597 m tall mountain above the village of Tettleham in Bavaria, Germany. On it there is a site known as a Burgstall with remains of Obertettelham Castle and remains of masonry and a chapel built in 1947.

== History ==
The Obertettelham Castle was the home of the Lords of Tettelham, who were administrators of the Counts of Kraiburg and later the Counts of Plain. In 1343, it was acquired by the Archbishop of Salzburg, Ortolf von Weißeneck and later became the site of a court of the Archbishopship of Salzburg. After being destroyed by a fire, the castle was rebuilt in 1505 under Archbishop Leonhard von Keutschach. In 1697, the administrative court was moved to Waging and the castle was left to decay to its current state.
