= Castle Mountain (Alaska) =

Mountain summit in Alaska, United States

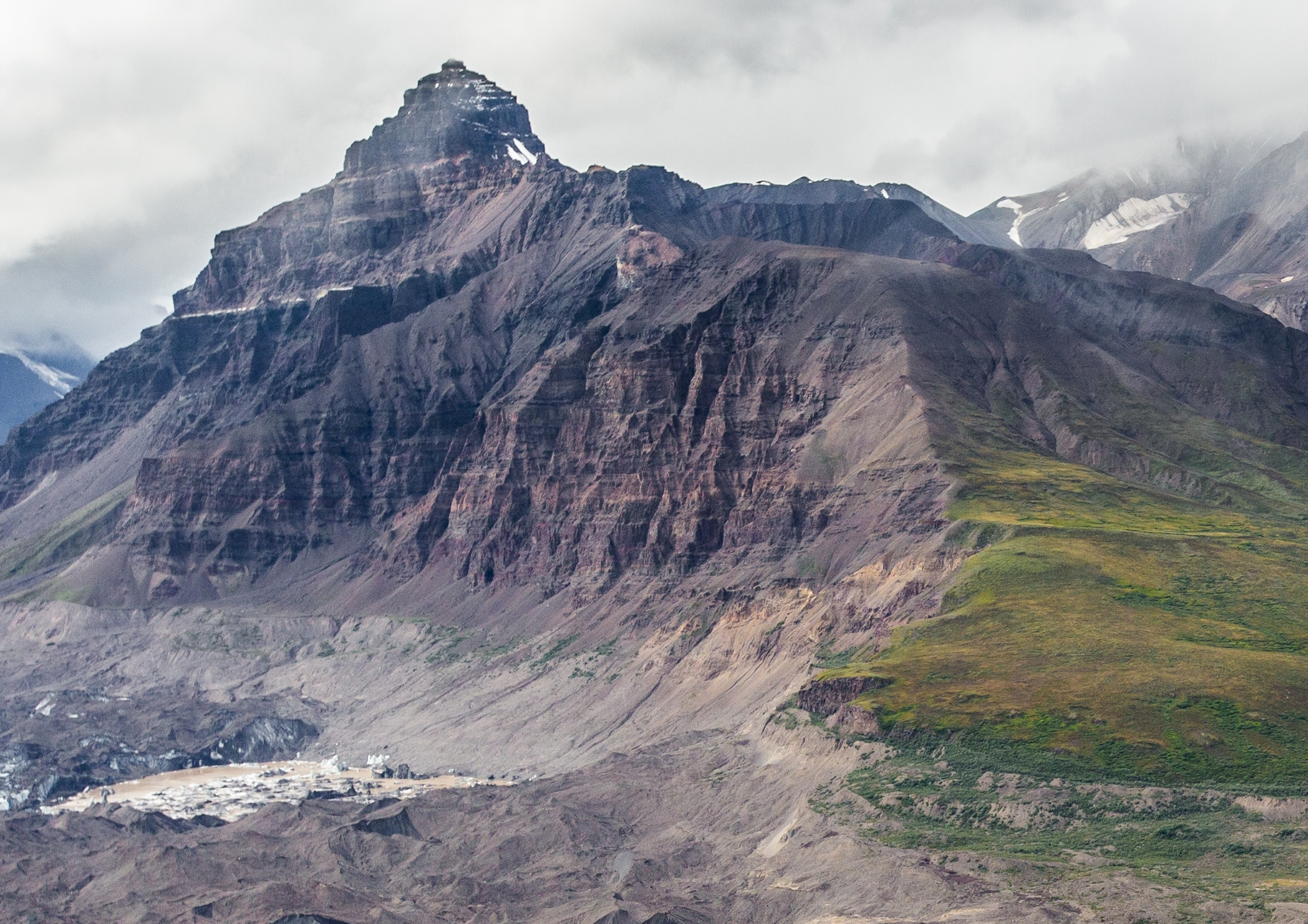
- Castle Mountain, east aspect

Highest point
- Elevation: 8,620 ft (2,630 m)
- Prominence: 1,170 ft (360 m)
- Isolation: 4.63 mi (7.45 km)
- Coordinates: 61°38′55″N 141°59′07″W

Geography
- Location within Alaska
- Interactive map of Castle Mountain
- Location: Wrangell-St. Elias National Park; Copper River Census Area; Alaska, United States
- Parent range: Wrangell Mountains
- Topo map: USGS McCarthy C-3

Geology
- Rock type: Sedimentary rock

Castle Mountain is a remote 8,620-foot (2,630-meter) mountain summit located at the southeastern edge of the Wrangell Mountains, in the U.S. state of Alaska. The peak is situated 35 mi (56 km) northeast of McCarthy at Skolai Pass in Wrangell-St. Elias National Park and Preserve. Although modest in elevation, relief is significant as the south face rises 4,000 feet above the terminus of the Russell Glacier in less than one mile. Precipitation runoff from the peak drains east via the White River, and west to the Nizina River via Skolai Creek. The mountain's descriptive name was reported in 1914 by the United States Geological Survey.

== Climate ==
Based on the Köppen climate classification, Castle Mountain is located in a subarctic climate zone with long, cold, snowy winters, and cool summers. Weather systems coming off the Gulf of Alaska are forced upwards by the Wrangell Mountains (orographic lift), causing heavy precipitation in the form of rainfall and snowfall. Temperatures can drop below −20 °F with wind chill factors below −30 °F. The months May through June offer the most favorable weather for viewing and climbing.

== Gallery ==
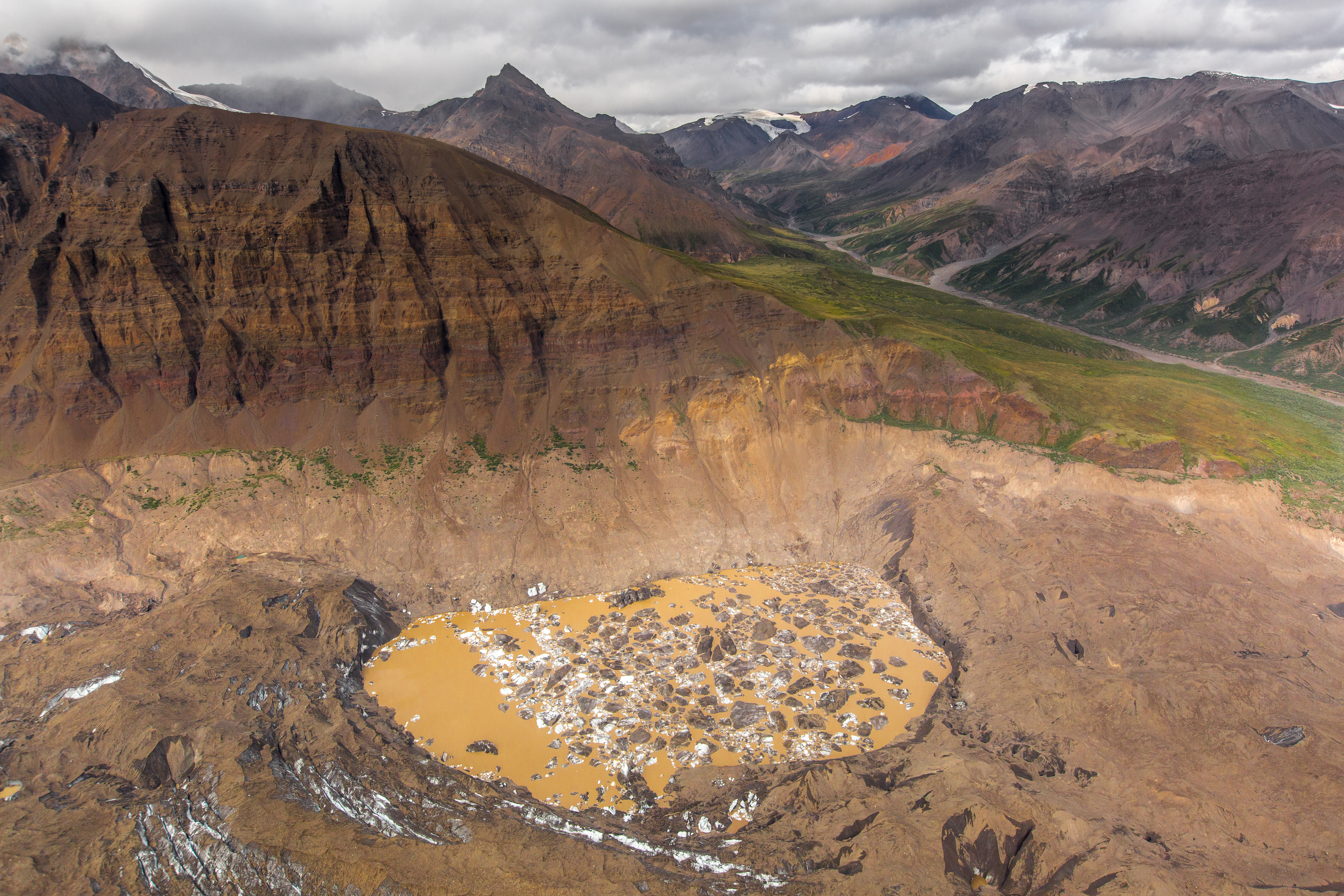
Sedimentary rock strata of Castle Mountain's southeast-facing cliffs tower above a supraglacial lake filled with icebergs

== See also ==
- Geography of Alaska
- List of mountain peaks of Alaska
