= Castle Hill, Caprington =

Wooded mound in East Ayrshire, Scotland

- Castle Motte, Caprington
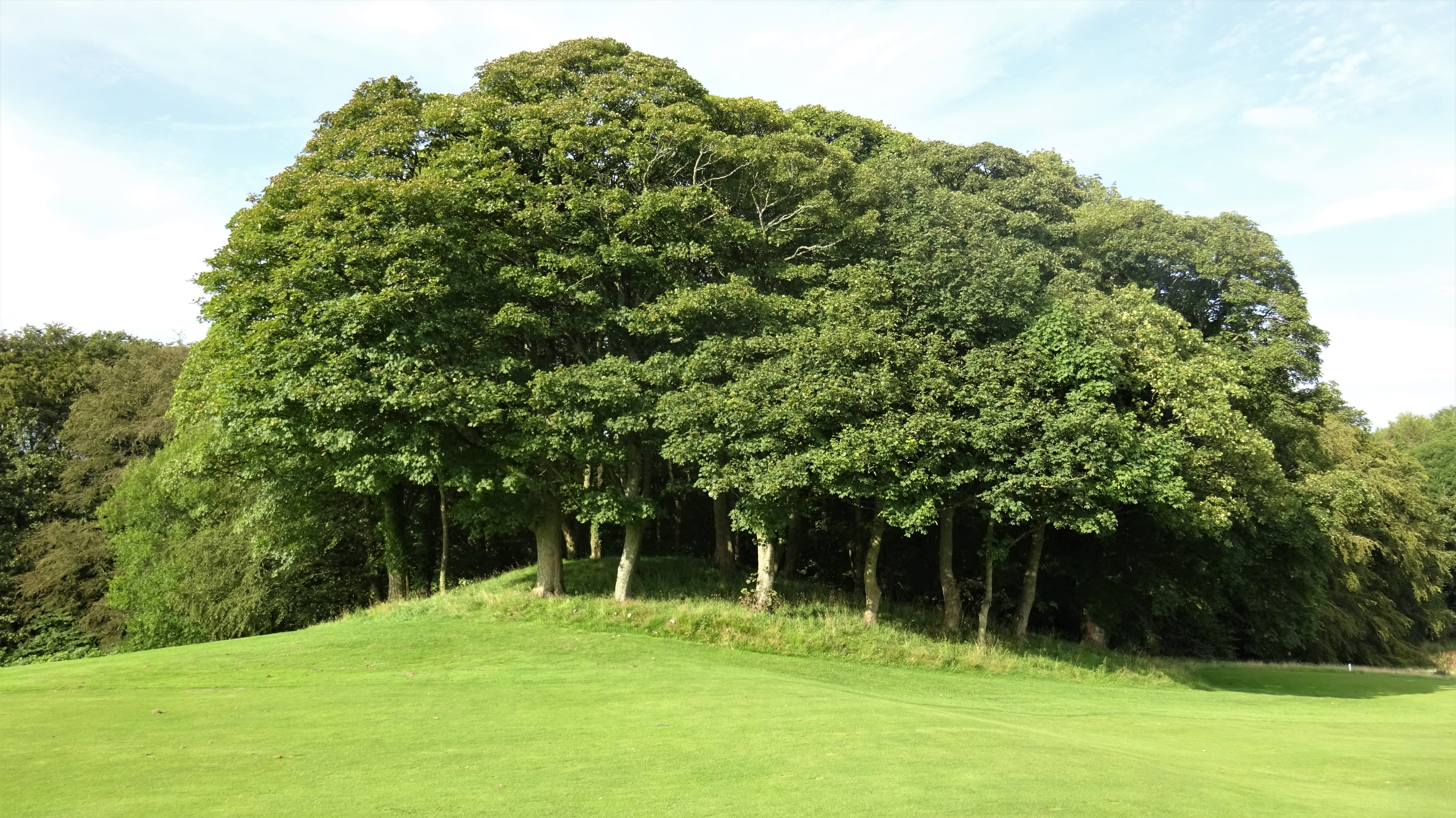
- Castle Hill from the south

- Location within Scotland
- 55.590625°N 4.5140785°W
- Type: Moot hill / Motte & Bailey
- Periods: Medieval
- Location: East Ayrshire, Scotland grid reference NS20365081

Site notes
- Material: Earth
- Length: 55 ft (17 m)
- Width: 30 ft (9.1 m)
- Excavation dates: None
- Archaeologists: John Smith
- Condition: Golf course damage
- Owner: Private
- Public access: Yes

The Castle Hill (NS 41661 35868) is a prominent wooded mound located slightly to the west of Damhead House on the Caprington Estate, Riccarton, East Ayrshire. Scotland. The mound may have served several different functions over the ages such as fortification, moot hill, estate landscape feature, etc.

== History ==
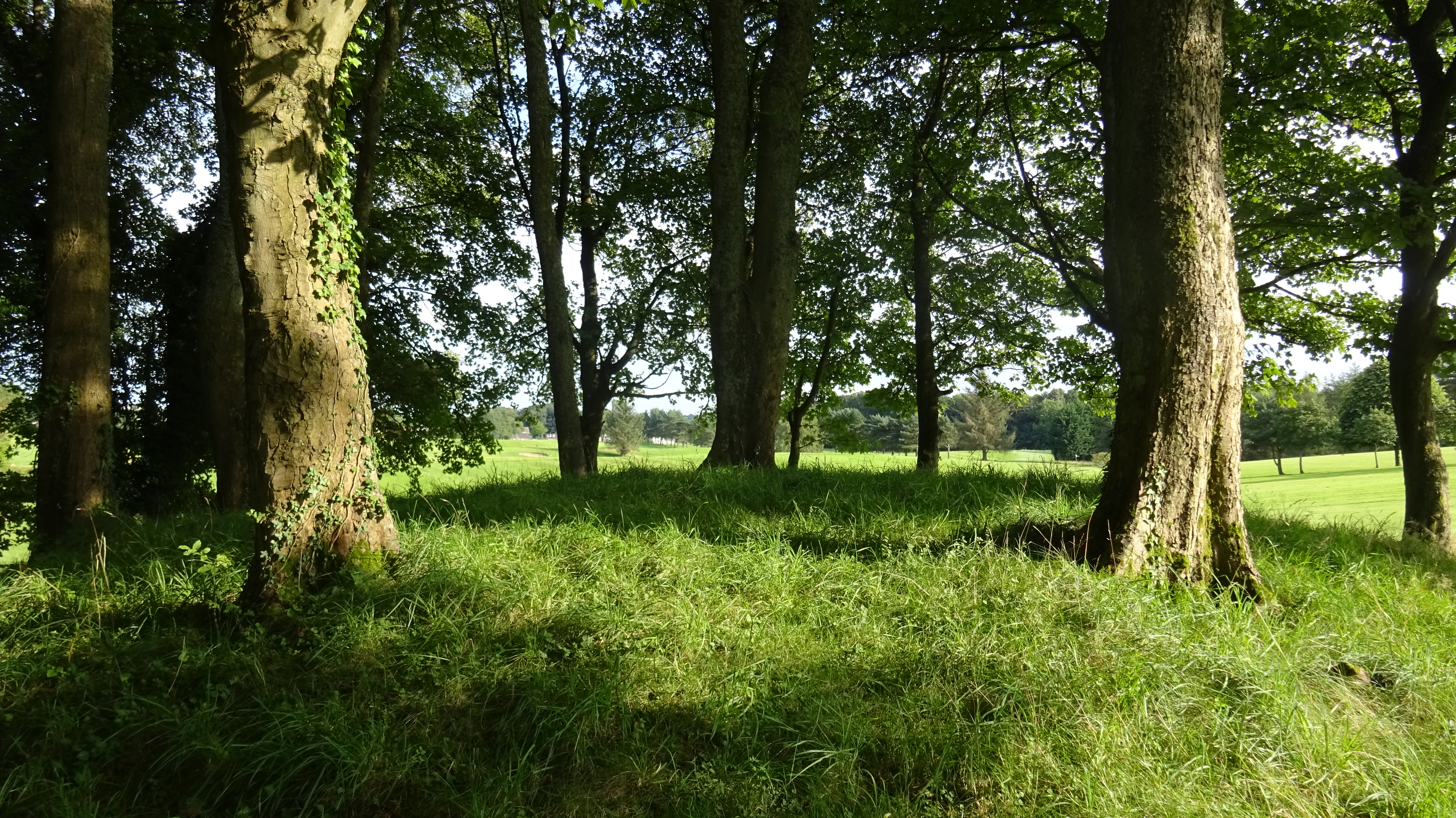
The level summit of Castle Hill

The Castle Hill has also been referred to as the Castle Motte. It is now a planted mound, projecting as a raised spur from an elevated ridge. The top is level and circa 5m in diameter. There is no remaining indication of a ditch or moat separating it from the ridge. The mound may be partly artificial and, with its flat top, could be a motte or the barony moot hill. A path once ran to the top and a bench was located on the summit.

=== Antiquarian visit ===
In 1895 the antiquarian John Smith recorded that the site may have been altered but was still a prominent feature that measured at the time 28 paces in diameter at the bottom, circa 15 feet on one side and circa 4.5 feet on the other.

=== Moot hill ===
Castle Hill was planted up in the 19th century as shown by OS map evidence and prior to that it was a prominent feature in the landscape suggesting that it was once the moot, court or justice hill and by association a gallows hill where a dule tree may have been located and where condemned male prisoners were executed, whilst females were drowned in a pit. The Castle Hill lies within the old Barony of Caprington that was created by Mary Queen of Scots in 1564 with its caput at the nearby Caprington Castle. Some records of the judgements of the Barony Court of Caprington are held by the National Archives of Scotland in Edinburgh. A pond is located slightly to the north, but it may be partly a flooded quarry although it is presently drained (datum 2019).

== Structural remains ==
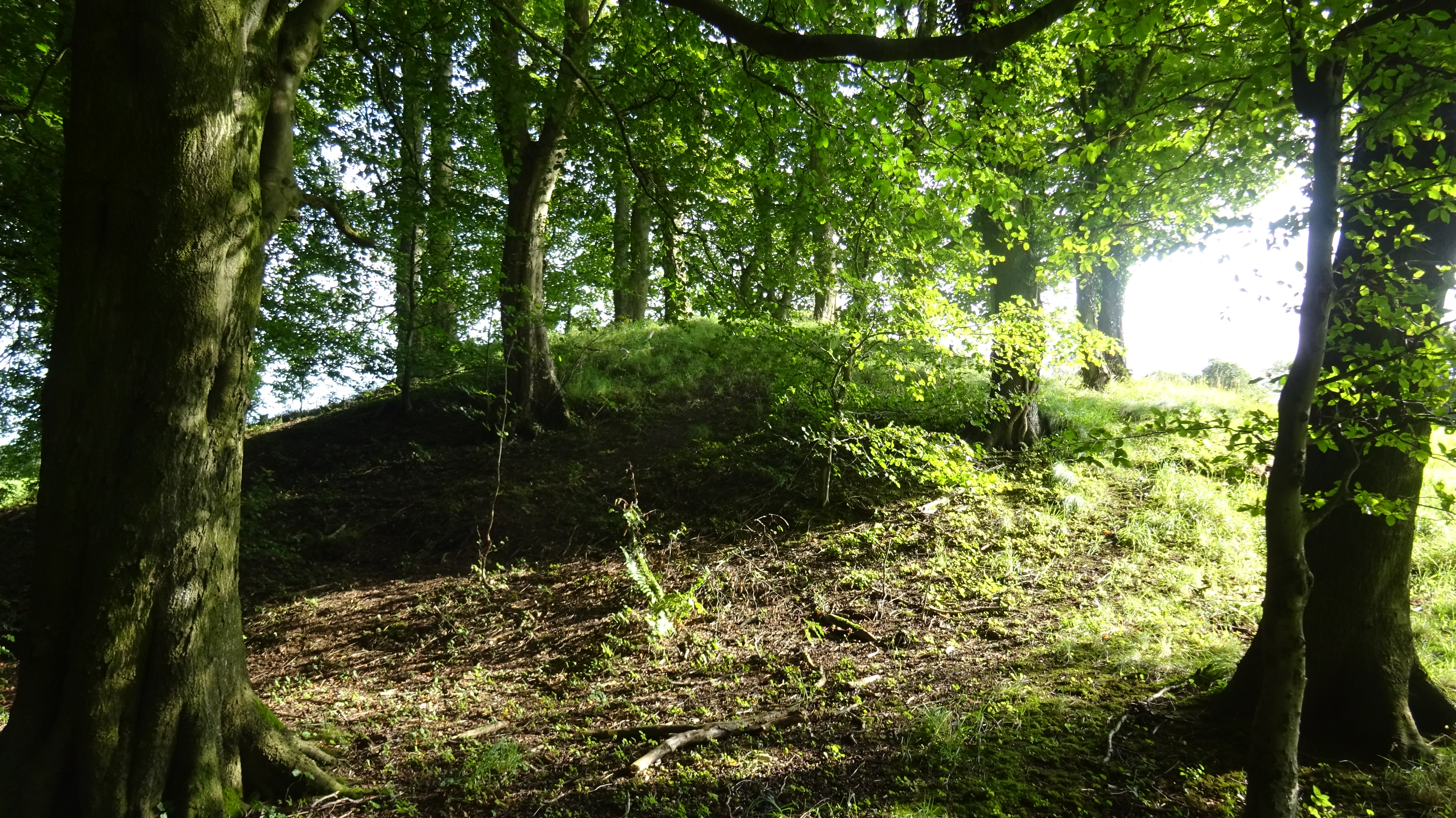
View of the mound from the lane.

A wooden structure may have been present however no sign of stone foundations or walling are visible at the mound and any ditch or moat once present may have been removed by natural soil movements and by activity related to the creation of landscape features by the estate and by the golf course management, such as hedge planting with surviving indications of hedge planting. Robbing of stone from abandoned structures is a common occurrence and may have taken place for nearby construction of drystone dykes, houses, etc. A well formed metalled track or lane runs from up from Damhead House, passing the base of Castle Hill before joining with the access road to Caprington Castle near the estate's bridge over the River Irvine.
