= Castle Hill, Hampshire =

Iron Age hillfort in Hampshire, England

Coordinates: 50.834768°N 1.719146°W

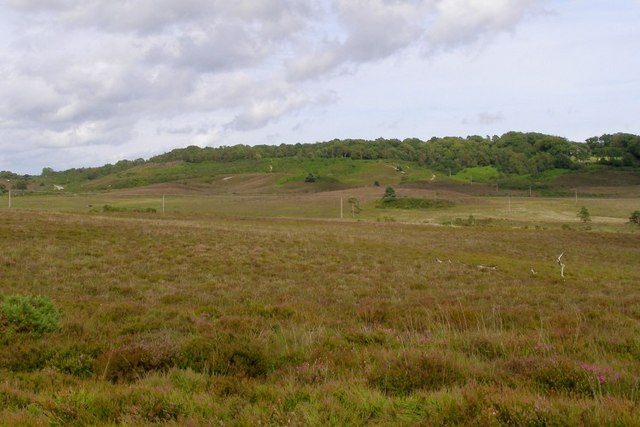
Castle Hill, Hampshire

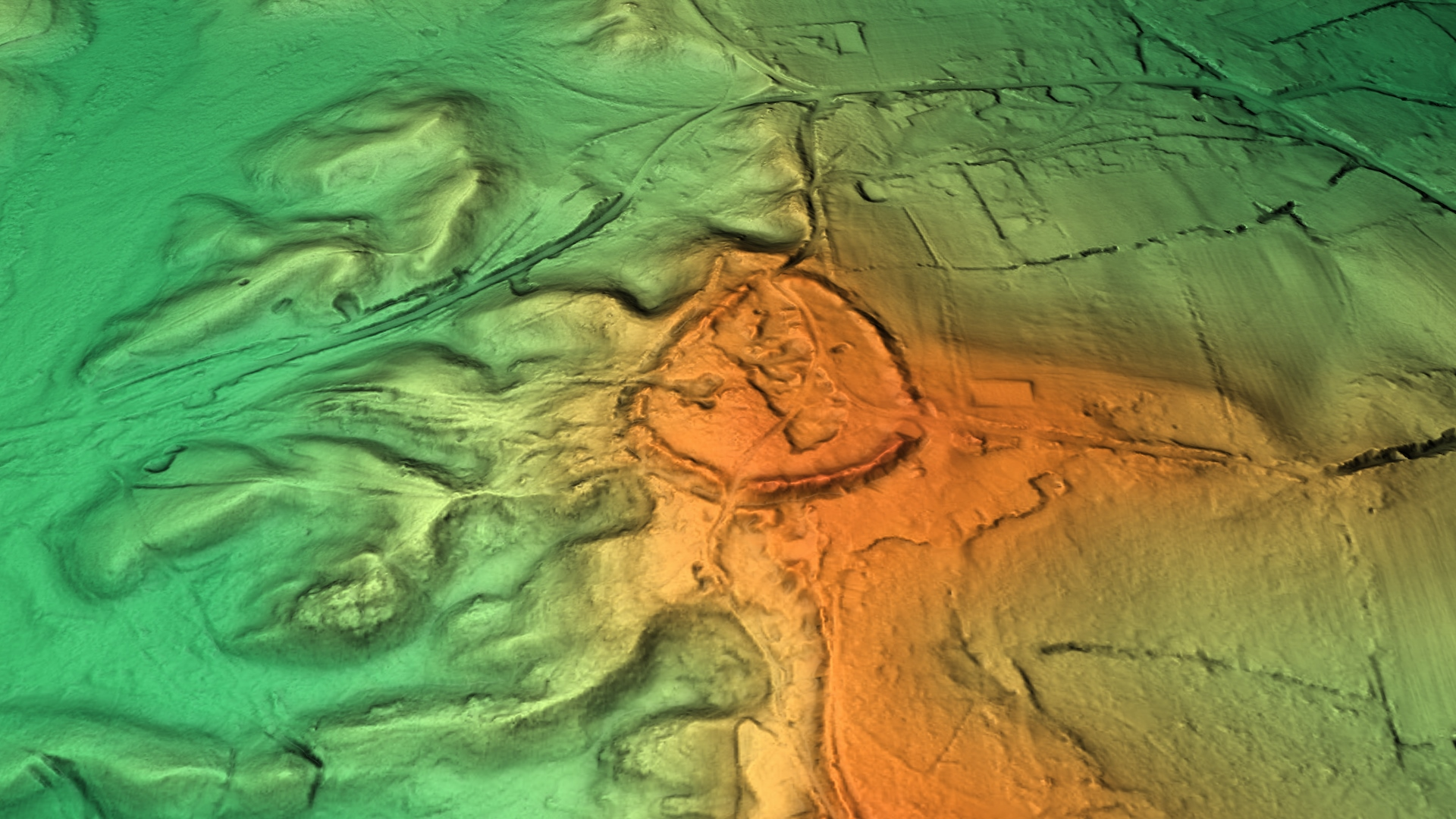
3D view of the digital terrain model

Castle Hill is the site of an Iron Age univallate hillfort located in the civil parish of Burley in the New Forest national park in Hampshire, England. Its single rampart and ditch earthworks enclose approximately five acres of land and is in reasonable condition for the most part, although it is cut through by tracks leading to local houses. Parts of the interior are marshy and much of it is overgrown with oak, silver birch, holly and bracken. The bank is at its highest on the eastern side, as the west side slopes steeply away. Hampshire treasures lists the site as a Scheduled Ancient Monument (No. 226). According to legend, the hill apparently was once the home to a local dragon, duly slain by a knight from the nearby village of Brook; and thus the local pub at Brook bears the name of the Green Dragon.

== Location ==
The site lies immediately to the west of the village of Burley Street, within the New Forest national park in the county of Hampshire. The site lies on a small hill of 92m AOD.

The site is within the parish of Burley, whose name may be derived from the Anglo-Saxon bury which means a 'fortified place'

- Map sources for Castle Hill, Hampshire
