= Castle Mountain (Washington) =

Mountain in Washington (state), United States

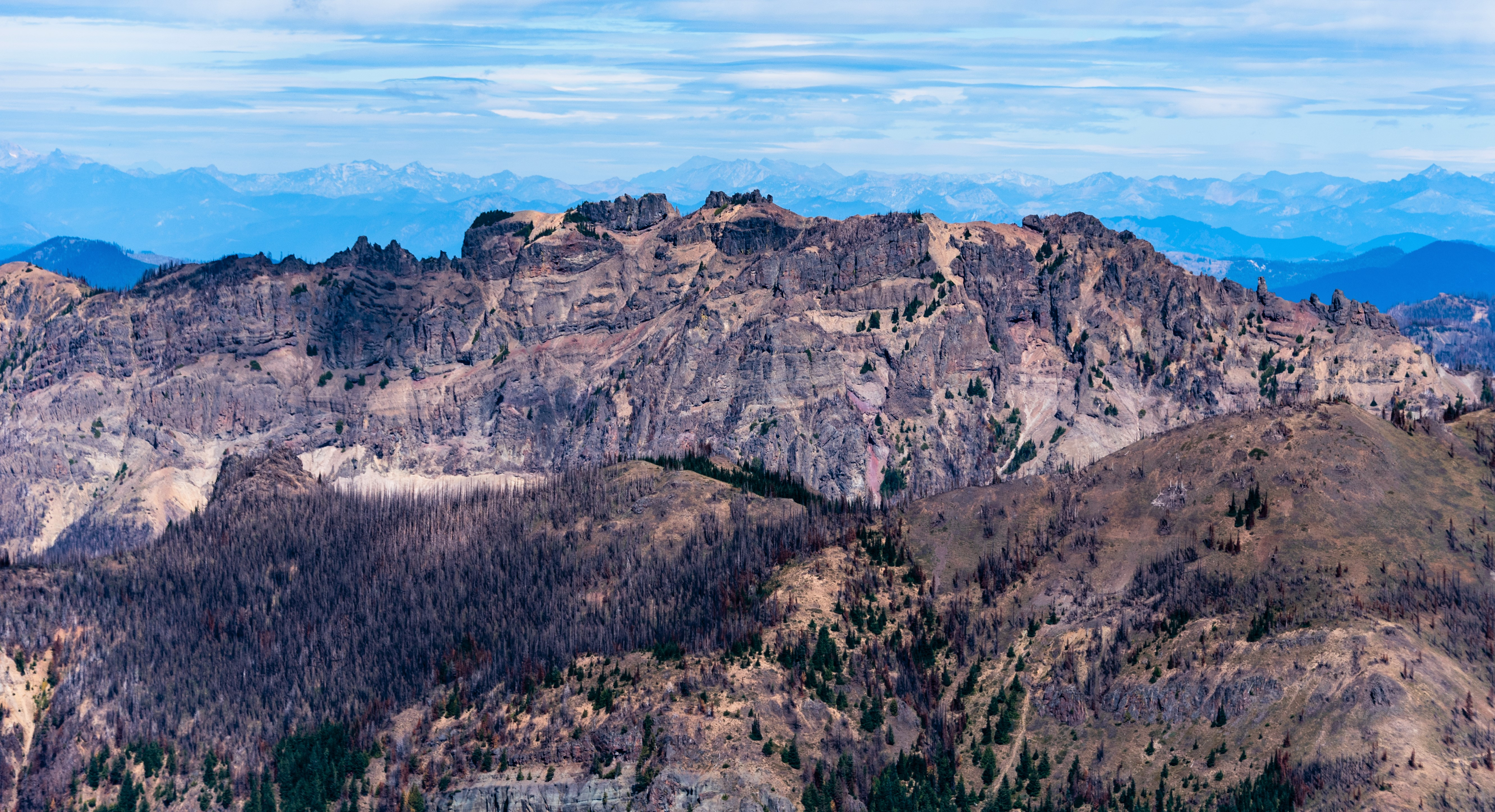
- South aspect

Highest point
- Elevation: 6,680 ft (2,040 m)
- Prominence: 520 ft (158 m)
- Isolation: 0.89 mi (1.43 km)
- Coordinates: 46°59′27″N 121°27′56″W

Geography
- Location within Washington (state) Location within the United States
- Country: United States
- State: Washington
- County: Pierce
- Protected area: Norse Peak Wilderness
- Parent range: Cascades
- Topo map: USGS Norse Peak

Climbing
- Easiest route: scrambling

Castle Mountain is a 6,680-foot (2,036 m) mountain summit located in Pierce County of Washington state. It is set on the boundary of Norse Peak Wilderness, on land managed by Mount Baker-Snoqualmie National Forest. It is situated three miles (4.8 km) north of Crystal Mountain ski area, and one mile west of the crest of the Cascade Range. Precipitation runoff from Castle Mountain drains into tributaries of the White River. The Pacific Crest Trail traverses the east slope of Castle's Southeast Peak.

== Climate ==
Castle Mountain is located in the marine west coast climate zone of western North America. Most weather fronts originating in the Pacific Ocean travel northeast toward the Cascade Mountains. As fronts approach, they are forced upward by the peaks of the Cascade Range (Orographic lift), causing them to drop their moisture in the form of rain or snow onto the Cascades. As a result, the west side of the Cascades experiences high precipitation, especially during the winter months in the form of snowfall. Because of maritime influence, snow tends to be wet and heavy, resulting in high avalanche danger. During winter months, weather is usually cloudy, but due to high pressure systems over the Pacific Ocean that intensify during summer months, there is often little or no cloud cover during the summer. The months of July through September offer the most favorable weather for viewing or climbing this peak.

== See also ==
- Geology of the Pacific Northwest
