= Schlossberg (surname) =

Schlossberg is a surname. Notable people with the surname include:

- Arthur Schloßberg, birth name of Jean Berger, American musicologist, composer, conductor and music publisher
- Caroline Bouvier Kennedy Schlossberg), or Caroline Kennedy (born 1957), American author and diplomat
- Edwin Schlossberg (born 1945), American designer and husband of Caroline Bouvier Kennedy
- Harvey Schlossberg (1936–2021), American police psychologist
- Hayden Schlossberg (born 1978), American screenwriter, director and producer
- Herbert Schlossberg
- John "Jack" Schlossberg (born 1993), American lawyer, heir and son of Caroline Bouvier Kennedy and Edwin Schlossberg
- Joseph Schlossberg, Belarusian-born Jewish-American labor activist
- Julian Schlossberg (born 1942), American motion picture, theater, and television producer
- Leah Schloßberg, birth name of Leah Rabin (1928–2000), Wife of Yitzhak Rabin
- Marvin Schlossberg, known professionally as Sonny Eliot (1920–2012), American meteorologist and comedian
- Max Schlossberg, American trumpeter of Latvian origin
- Michael Schlossberg, American politician
- Rose Schlossberg (born 1988), American actress and daughter of Caroline Bouvier Kennedy and Edwin Schlossberg
- Ruth Schlossberg, birth name of Ruth Landes, American anthropologist
- Stephen Schlossberg (1921–2011), union organizer and undersecretary for labor-management relations under President Reagan
- Tatiana Schlossberg (1990–2025), American environmental journalist and author; daughter of Caroline Bouvier Kennedy and Edwin Schlossberg

== See also ==
- Schlosberg
