= Castle Hill, Ceredigion =

Area and estate in Ceredigion, Wales

Coordinates: 52.35217°N 4.019371°W

Castle Hill: Welsh: Post Bach
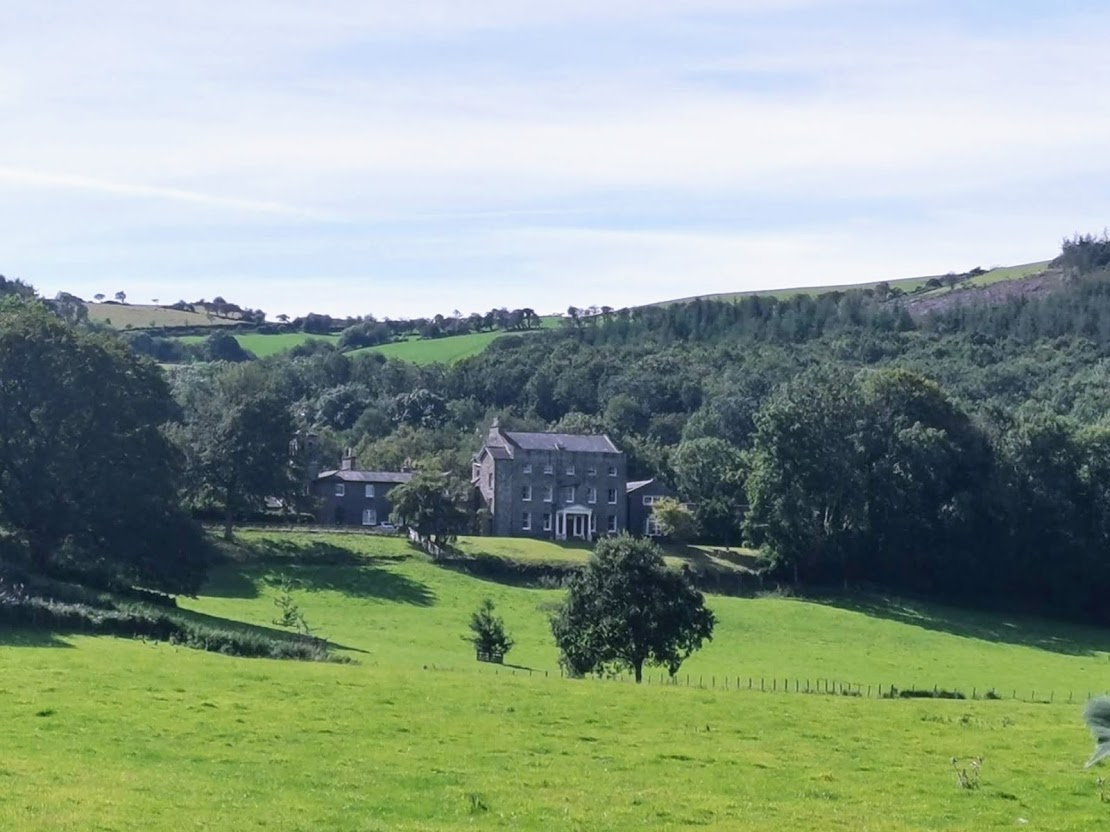

- Location within Ceredigion
- OS grid reference: SN 6256 7460
  - Cardiff: 70.2 mi (113.0 km)
  - London: 175.8 mi (282.9 km)
- Community: Llanilar
- Principal area: Ceredigion
- Country: Wales
- Sovereign state: United Kingdom
- Post town: Aberystwyth
- Postcode district: SY23
- Police: Dyfed-Powys
- Fire: Mid and West Wales
- Ambulance: Welsh
- UK Parliament: Ceredigion Preseli
- Senedd Cymru – Welsh Parliament: Ceredigion

Castle Hill is an area and country estate in the community of Llanilar, Ceredigion, Wales. It is 70.2 miles (112.9 km) from Cardiff and 175.8 miles (282.9 km) from London. As of 2024, Castle Hill is represented in the Senedd by Ben Lake (Plaid Cymru) and is part of the Ceredigion Preseli constituency in the House of Commons.

== See also ==
- List of localities in Wales by population
