= Schlossberg Ulrichstein =

Mountain in Germany

Coordinates: 50°34′37″N 9°11′24″E

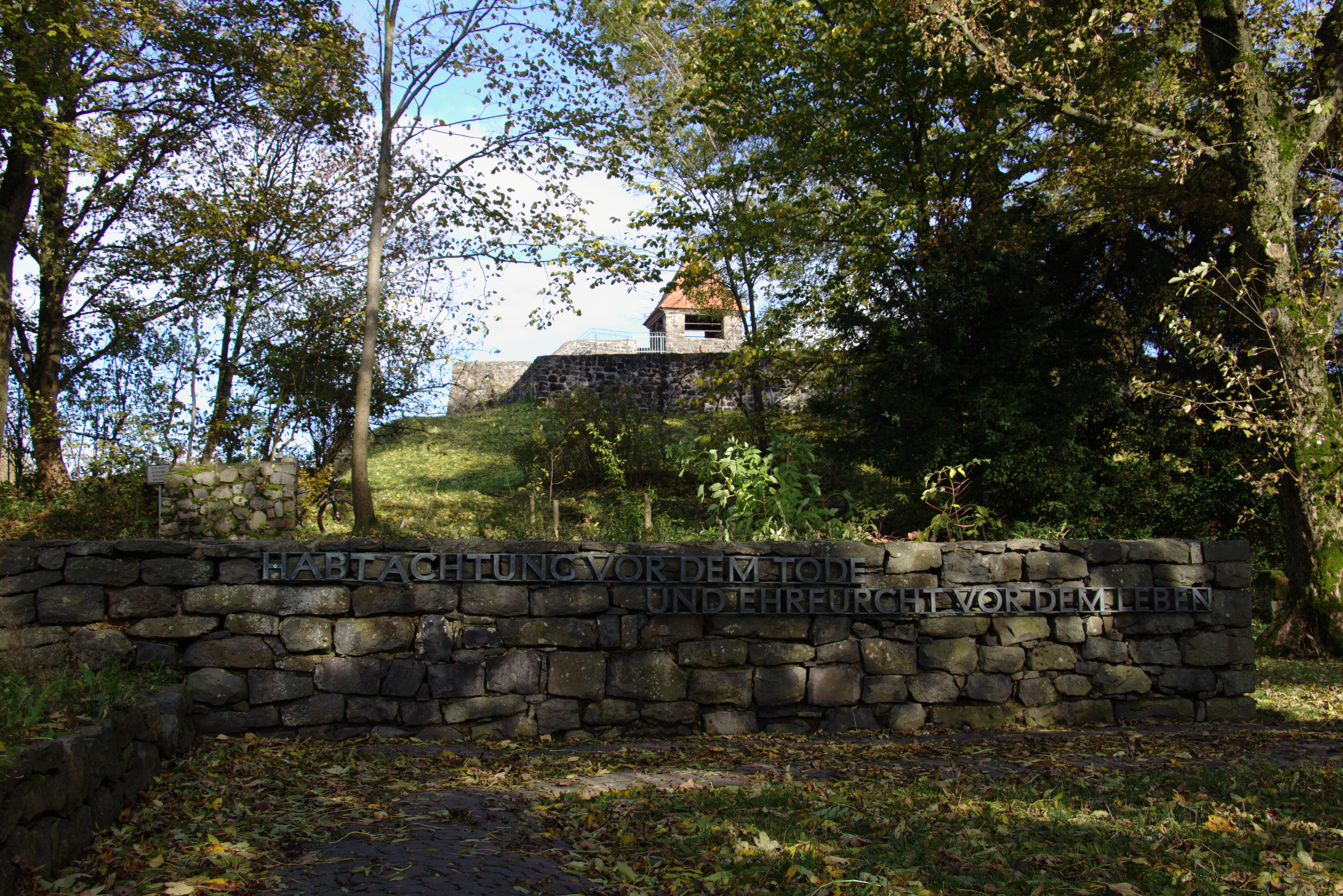
- Top of Schlossberg Ulrichstein with war cemetery and castle

Highest point
- Elevation: 614 m (2,014 ft)

Geography
- Location: Hesse, Germany

Schlossberg Ulrichstein is a mountain of Hesse, Germany. It is located in the town of the same name.
