= Strahlenfelser Schlossberg =

Mountain in Bavaria, Germany

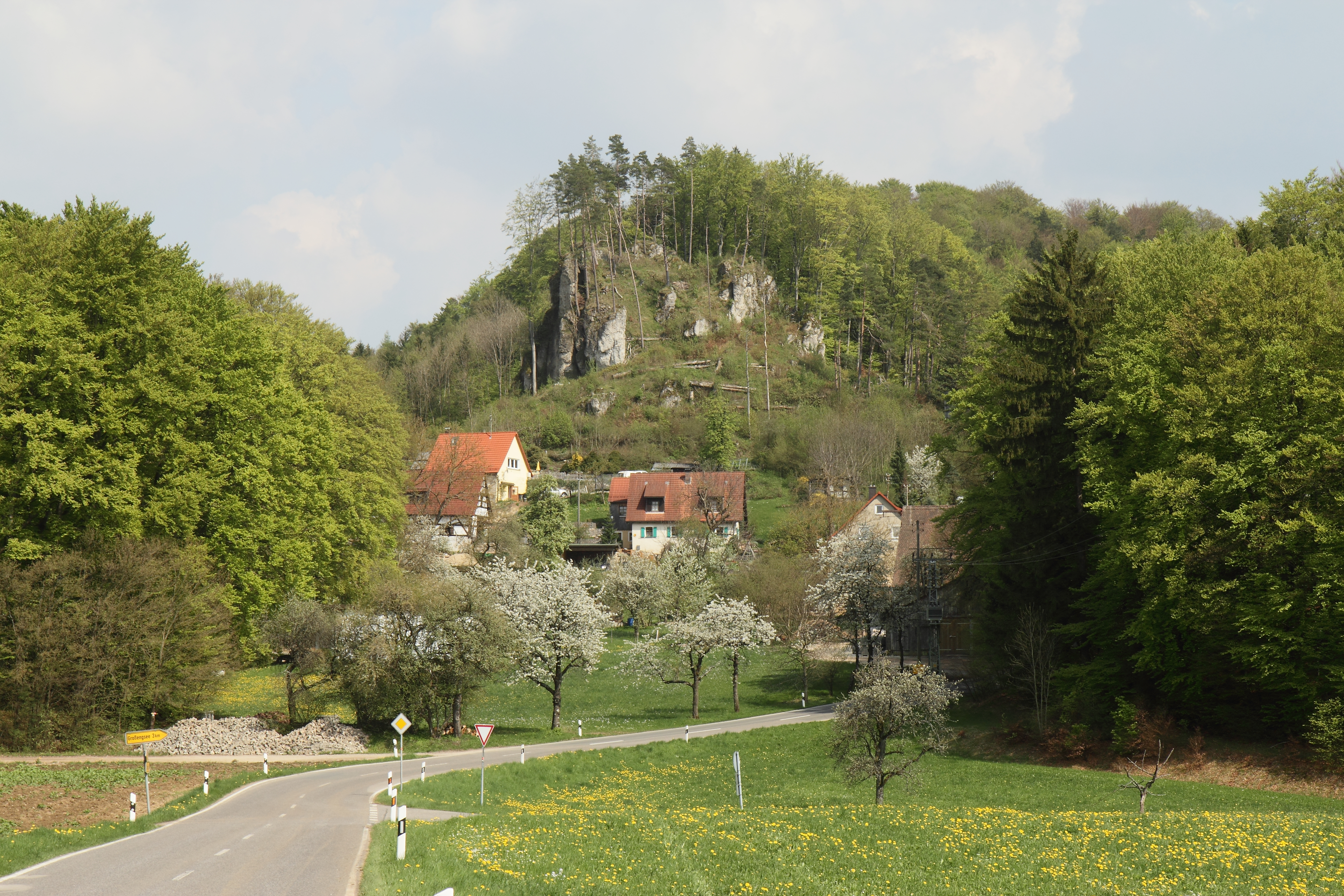
- Strahlenfels from the west

Highest point
- Elevation: 570 m (1,870 ft)
- Coordinates: 49°39′11.5″N 11°22′37.4″E

Geography
- Location within Bavaria
- Location: Bavaria, Germany

Strahlenfelser Schlossberg is a mountain of Bavaria, Germany, with castle ruins on its top.

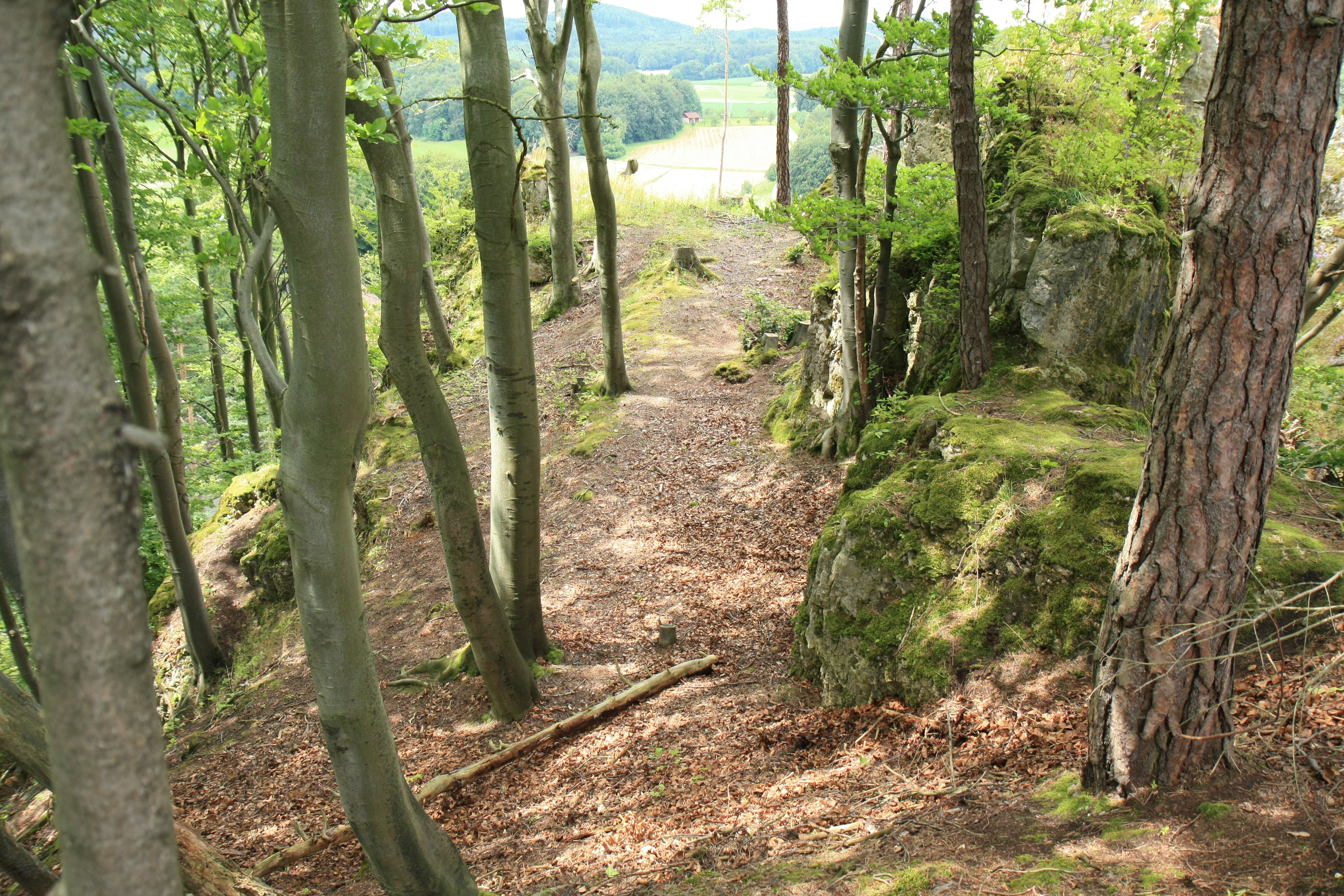
Plateau of the Strahlenfels Castle

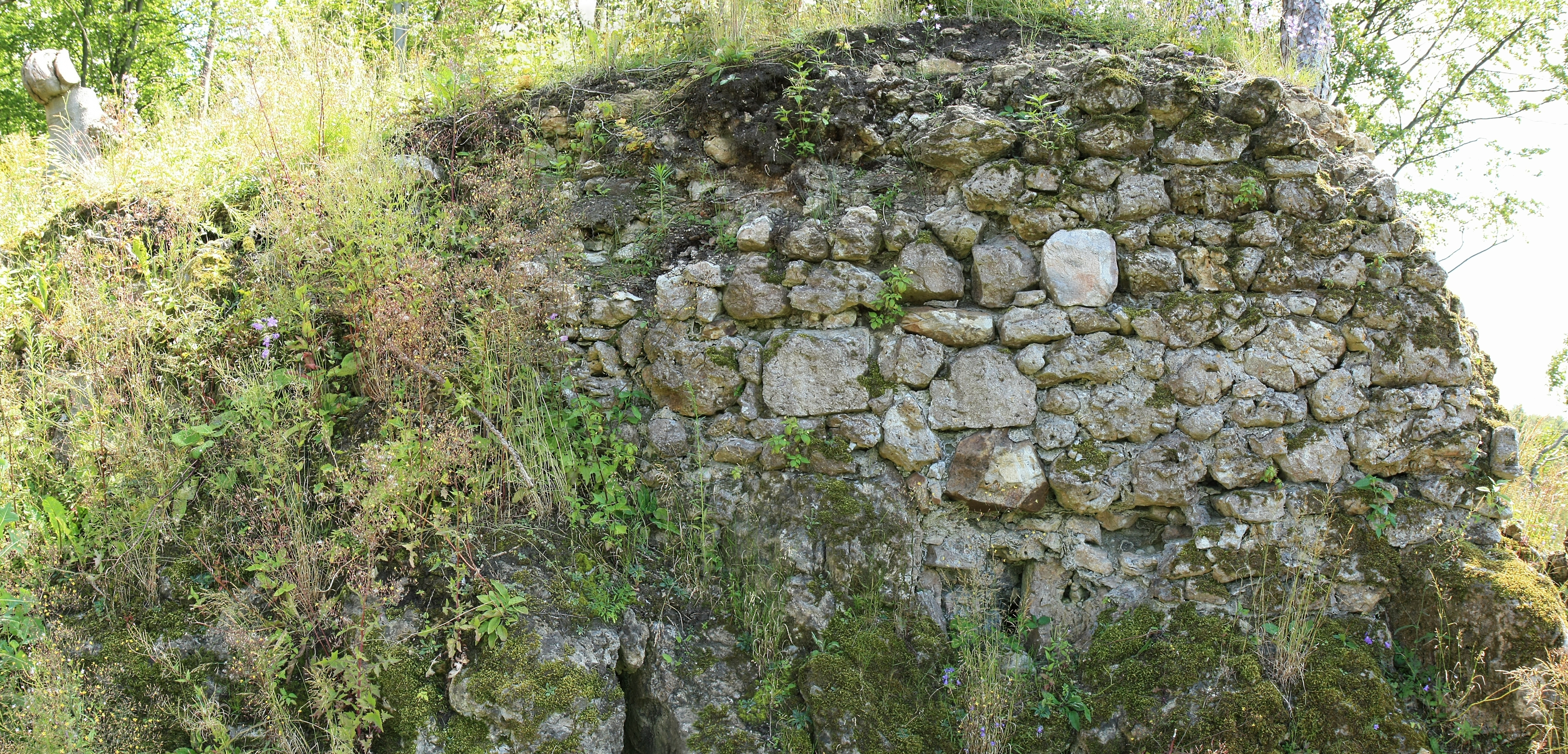
Wall remnants on the west side of the castle stables
