= Ittlinger Bach =

River in Germany

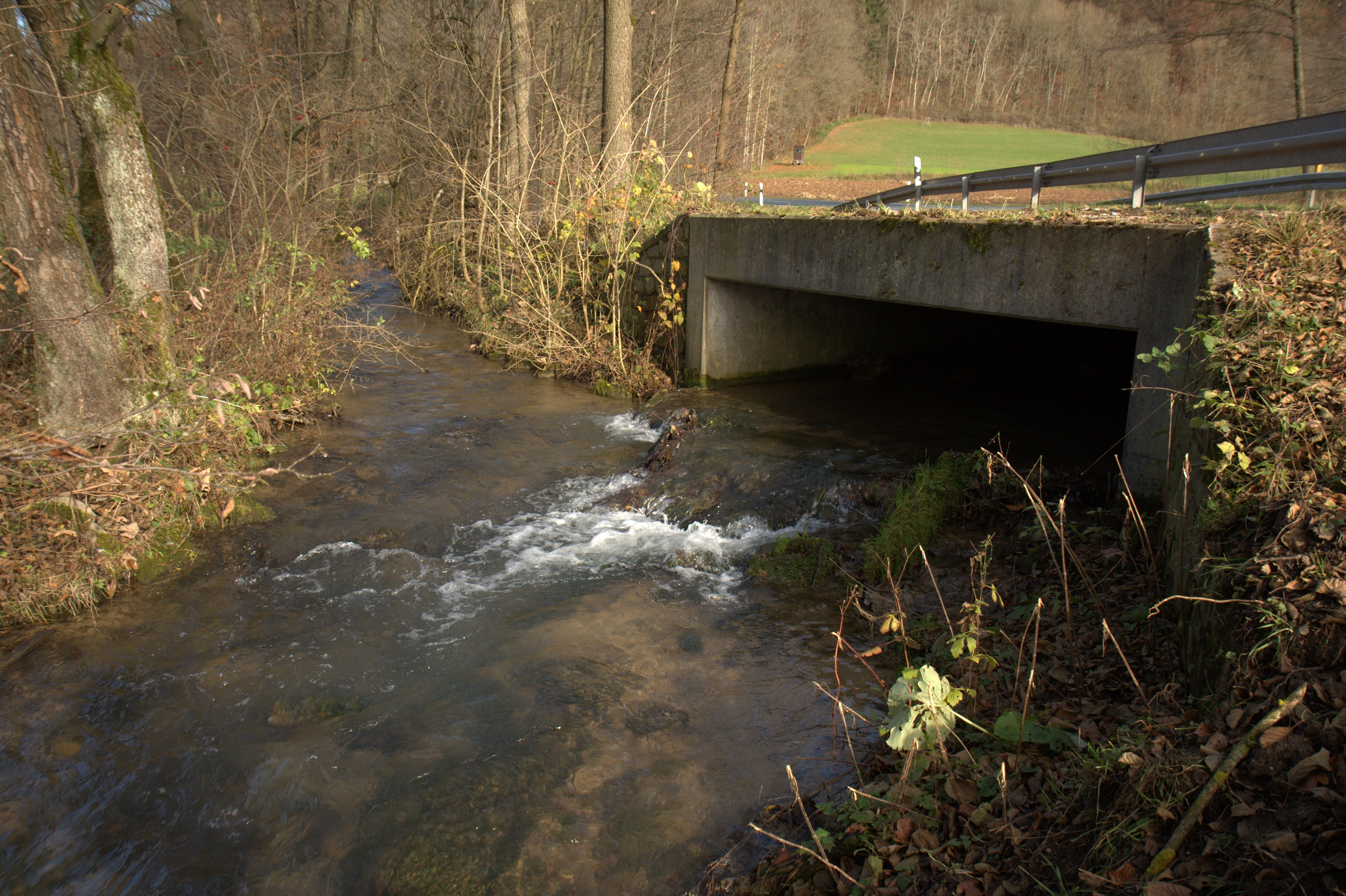
- Confluence of the Ittlinger Bach (from the right) and Naifer Bach (from the background left) forming the Schnaittach (foreground)

Location
- Country: Germany
- States: Bavaria

Physical characteristics
- Mouth
  - location: Schnaittach
  - coordinates: 49.6136°N 11.3606°E

Basin features
- Progression: Schnaittach→ Pegnitz→ Regnitz→ Main→ Rhine→ North Sea

Ittlinger Bach is a small river of Bavaria, Germany. It flows into the Schnaittach near Diepoltsdorf.

== Geography ==
=== Course ===
The Ittling rises south of the Simmelsdorf village of Ittling, just above the mill Ittlinger Mühle, in a valley that is clearly incised here, runs to the southwest and is wooded except for a narrow floodplain. There are two springs, the one furthest from the mouth rises at about 440 m above sea level . Immediately after this, the river splits into two branches, the one that initially runs on the left side of the valley road is fed by another spring on the lower slope at about 445 m above sea level. Opposite the Ittlinger mill, which follows shortly after and through whose grounds both branches then run, there is a large quarry in the White Jurassic limestone, which is mostly hidden by trees.

The branches reunite, and further downstream the Ittling flows through two of Simmelsdorf's mill hamlets, Oberachtel and Unterachtel. Between the last pair of branches there are half a dozen small fish ponds, and there are a few more below Unterachtel. Then the Ittling flows from the left and finally east at over 395m above sea level, joining the Naifer Bach to form the Schnaittach, which flows a little further downstream on a southwesterly course through the municipality's village of Diepoltsdorf.

The district road LAU2, which is also called Achtelstraße, runs through the valley from Ittling.

=== Catchment area ===
The catchment area of the Ittlinger Bach is about 12.4 km² and extends more than 5.5 km from the rocky summit of the Hühnerstein (598m above sea level ) southwest to the mouth. In its upper area there are only dry valleys, the stream only begins far downstream after the eponymous village of Ittling. The highest point at 635m above sea level is on the eastern watershed on the rocky summit of the Hohe Reut east of Spies, a part of the town Betzenstein; several other peaks also rise above 600m above sea level.

There are no open competitors in the upper catchment area, so that the drainage in the Karst flows underground in other directions than the surrounding dry valleys suggest, namely north-west and north of the catchment area in a northerly direction to the Trubach; east of it approximately southeast to the Regnitz, partly also south via the Sittenbach. Further downstream in the area of the stream, near the confluence with the Schnaittach, the Osternoher Bach, which feeds it, is briefly the southeastern competitor, whose right upper course, the Naifer Bach, is longer the western one.

=== Pathway ===
The Ittling flows through the following places:

- Ittlinger Mühle
- Oberachtel (hamlet)
- Unterachtel (hamlet)
- Wachsteinhaus (detached house, at the mouth of the Brünstberg to the valley of the Naifer Bach)

They all belong to the municipality of Simmelsdorf in the district of Nürnberger Land. Other places in the catchment area are the village of Ittling in Simmelsdorf, as well as part of the village of Bernhof in the southeastern neighboring market town of Schnaittach. The village of Spies and the hamlet of Schermshöhe lie within the watershed in the area of the town of Betzenstein in the district of Bayreuth.

== Geology ==
The largest part of the catchment area lies in the White Jura, where the Ittlinger Bach also rises, which reaches the Brown Jura below the Ittlinger Mühle, where it also flows. From the northern catchment area boundary, a long wedge of an Upper Cretaceous layer island extends far southwards almost to Ittlingen, at an altitude well below the White Jura ridges on the western and eastern borders.

== Individual references ==
=== BayernAtlas ("BA") ===
Official online water map with appropriate section and the layers used here: Course and catchment area of the Ittlinger Bach General entry without presets and layers: BayernAtlas of the Bavarian State Government

1. Altitude queried on the background layer Official Map.
2. Altitude according to the contour image on the background layer Official Map .
3. Length measured on the background layer Official Map .
4. Catchment area measured on the background layer Official map using the contour of the upper Schnaittach catchment area on: Map service for water management, FGN Bavarian State Office for the Environment
5. Elevation according to black labeling on the background layer Official map .
6. Geology according to the layer Geological Map 1:500,000 .

== See also ==
- List of rivers of Bavaria
