= Weihergraben =

Weihergraben may refer to:

- Weihergraben (Altmühl), a river of Bavaria, Germany, a tributary of the Altmühl
- Weihergraben (Zipser Mühlbach), a river of Bavaria, Germany, a tributary of the Zipser Mühlbach
- Walkershöfer Weihergraben, a river of Bavaria, Germany, a tributary of the Swabian Rezat
