= Weihergraben (Zipser Mühlbach) =

River in Germany

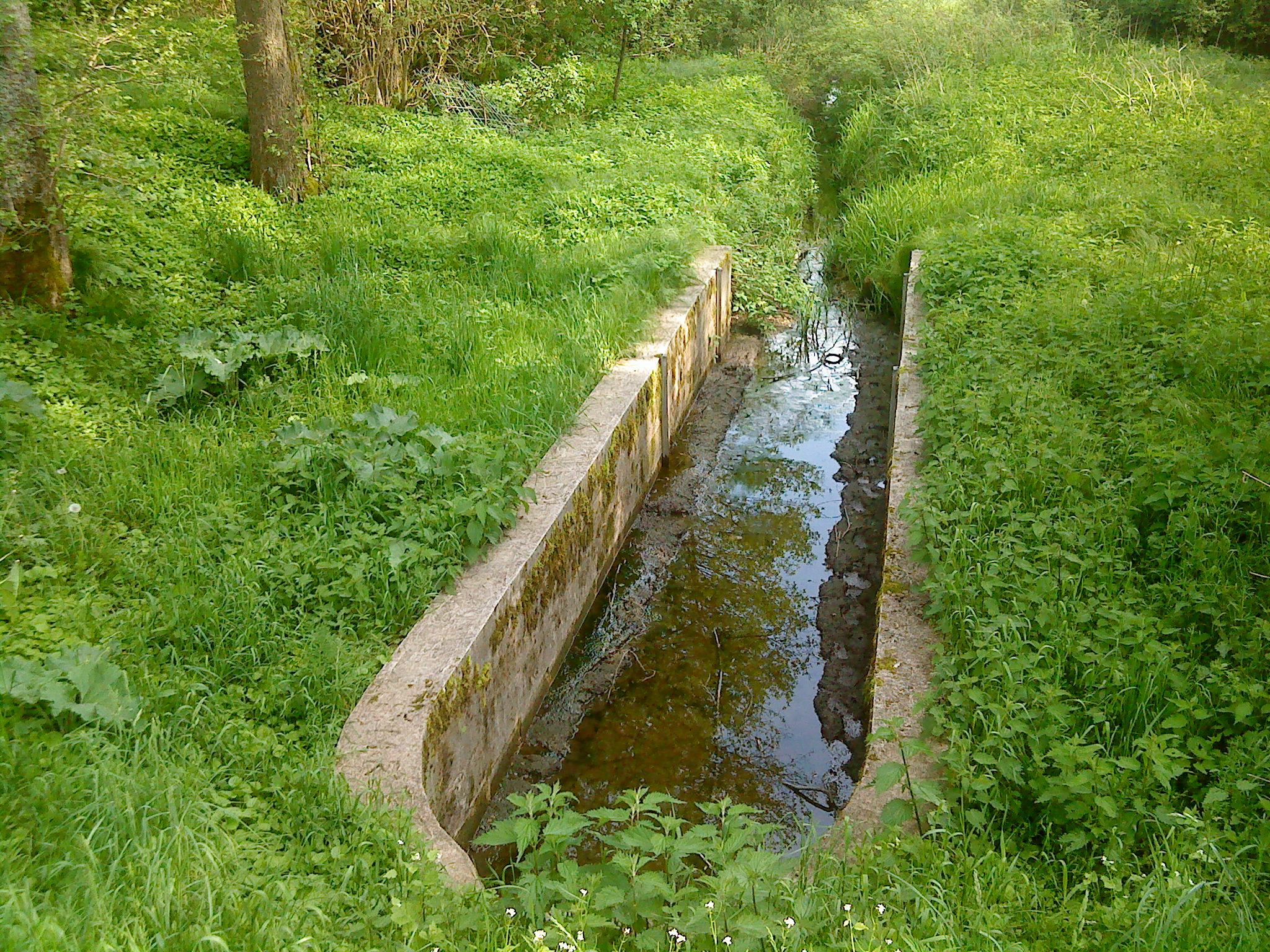
- Outflow of the Weihergraben from the Craimoosweiher

Location
- Country: Germany
- State: Bavaria

Physical characteristics
- Mouth
  - location: Zipser Mühlbach
  - coordinates: 49.7835°N 11.5718°E

Basin features
- Progression: Zipser Mühlbach→ Fichtenohe→ Pegnitz→ Regnitz→ Main→ Rhine→ North Sea subdivision_type1 = Country

Weihergraben is a small river of Bavaria, Germany.

Its source is an outflow of the pond Craimoosweiher. It is a right tributary of the Zipser Mühlbach in Zips.

== See also ==
- List of rivers of Bavaria
