= Hersbrucker Alb =

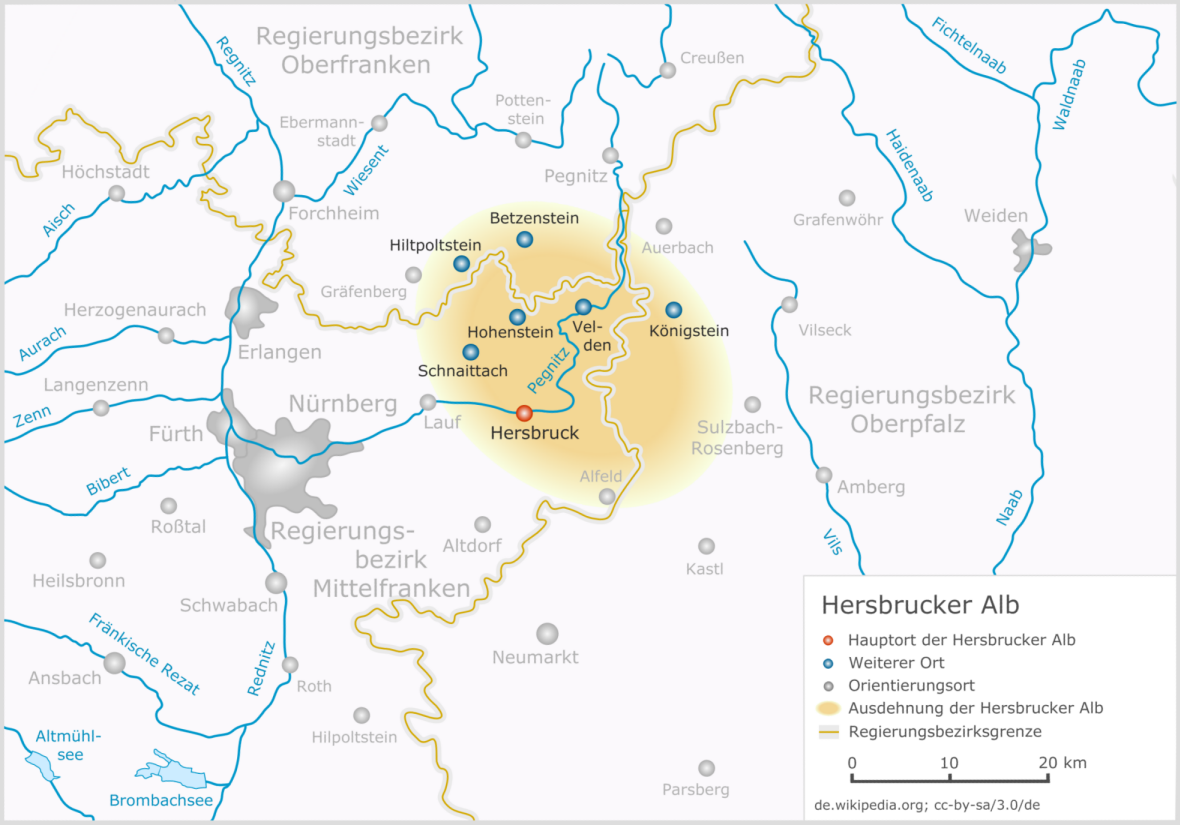
Hersbrucker Alb

The Hersbrucker Alb ("Hersbruck Jura") – also called Hersbrucker Schweiz ("Hersbruck Switzerland") or Pegnitz-Alb ("Pegnitz Jura") – is the northeastern part of the Franconian Jura near the town of Hersbruck. The River Pegnitz and its tributaries flow through the region.

== Location ==
In the west the Hersbrucker Alb reaches the valley of the Schnaittach. It is bounded by the course of the Pegnitz and Hiltpoltstein to the west, Betzenstein to the north, Auerbach in der Oberpfalz and Sulzbach-Rosenberg to the east and Alfeld (Mittelfranken) to the south. Much of it lies within the Bavarian provinces of Middle Franconia and the Upper Palatinate; a small part is in Upper Franconia.

The Hersbrucker Alb is formed from the White Jura platform of hard, brittle and karstified massive and Corallian Limestones and the Franconian dolomite together with their more recent depositions. Numerous caves and a striking rock landscape have resulted in the area being referred to as "Hersbruck Switzerland" (Hersbrucker Schweiz, formerly Nürnberger Schweiz). The Hersbrucker Alb is part of the Northern Franconian Jura climbing area. The term Alb may come from the Latin montes albi ("white mountains"). The term is however probably an old Celtic word meaning "mountain meadow".

The Ossinger 651.1 m above NN is the highest point of the Hersbrucker Alb.

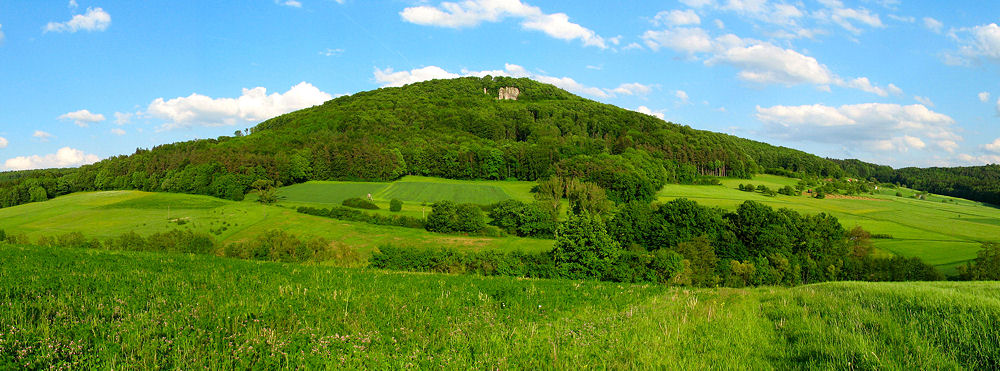
The Glatzenstein

== Literature ==
- Eckhardt Pfeiffer: Hersbrucker Alb (2001), Pfeiffer Verlag, 2001, ISBN 3-927412-18-X
- Friedrich Herrmann: Höhlen der Fränkischen und Hersbrucker Schweiz. Regensburg, 1980
- Hardy Schabdach: Unterirdische Welten - Höhlen der Fränkischen und Hersbrucker Schweiz. Verlag Reinhold Lippert, Ebermannstadt, 2000

== Maps ==
- No.53 Sheet South. Veldensteiner Forst, Hersbrucker Alb. ISBN 3-86116-053-6
- No.72 Hersbrucker Alb in der Frankenalb, Pegnitz- und Hirschbachtal. ISBN 3-86116-072-2
