= Fischbach (Pegnitz) =

River in Germany

- A bridge over the Fischbach

Location
- Country: Germany
- State: Bavaria

Physical characteristics
- Mouth
  - location: Goldbach
  - coordinates: 49.4467°N 11.1090°E

Basin features
- Progression: Goldbach→ Pegnitz→ Regnitz→ Main→ Rhine→ North Sea

Fischbach (German pronunciation: [ˈfɪʃˌbax]) is a small river of Bavaria, Germany, south-east of Nuremberg. It is a tributary of the Goldbach which discharges into the Pegnitz.

== See also ==
- List of rivers of Bavaria
