= Hohenstein Castle (Middle Franconia) =

Cultural heritage monument in Landkreis Nürnberger Land, Bavaria, Germany

Hohenstein Castle (Burg Hohenstein)
- Location within Bavaria Location within Germany

Highest point
- Elevation: 917 m (3,009 ft)
- Coordinates: 49°35′12″N 11°25′22″E

Geography
- Location: Bavaria, Germany
- Parent range: Bavarian Forest

Geology
- Mountain type: granite

Hohenstein Castle (German: Burg Hohenstein) in Middle Franconia is a castle in Bavaria, Germany.

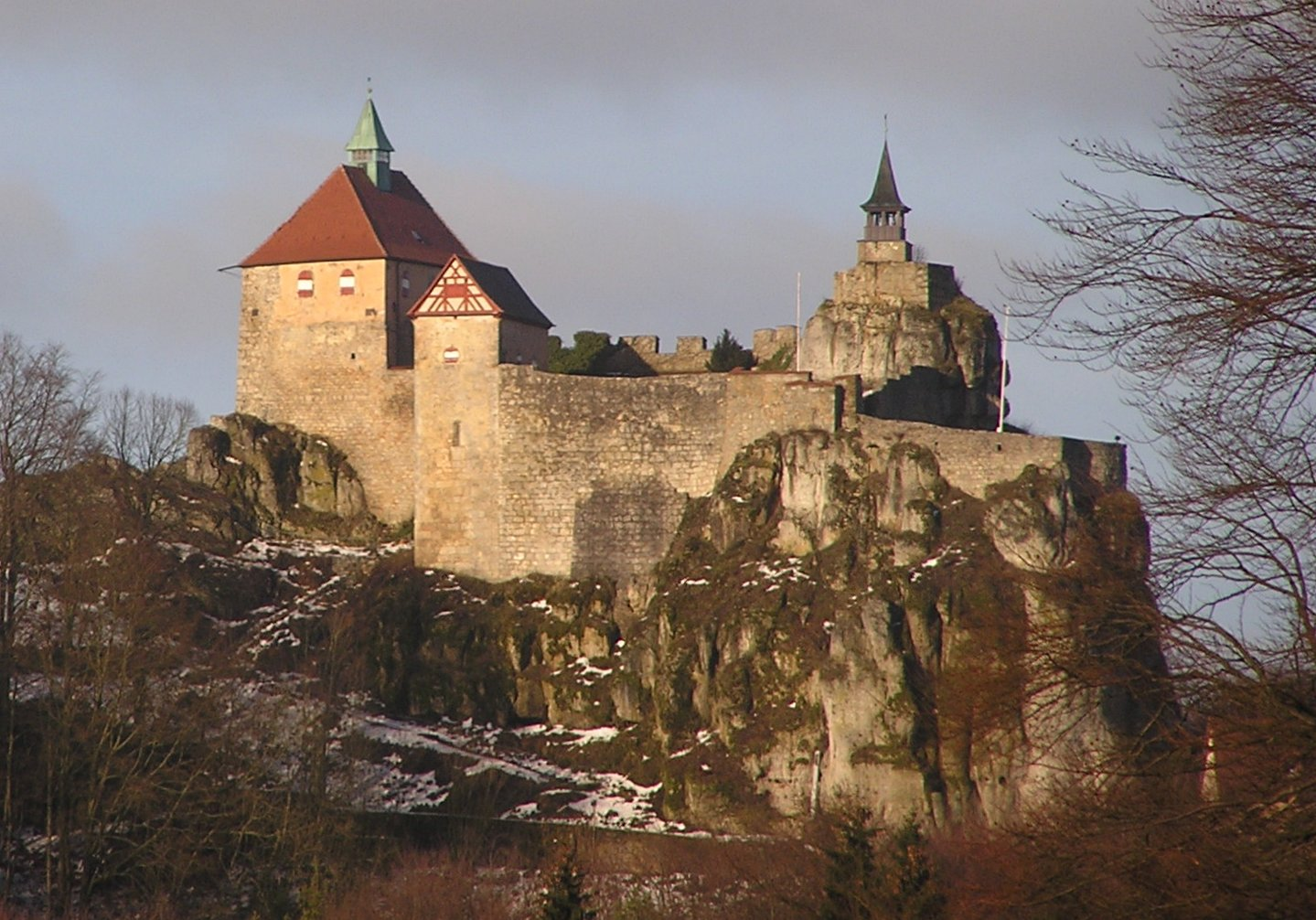
Burg Hohenstein in Hersbrucker Schweiz.

== The origin of the castle ==
The origins of Hohenstein Castle probably go back to the 11th century. The first written mention occurred in 1163, when a certain Sicolinus was used as a castle guard by Hohenstein. In the following centuries, there have been several changes in power relations. The Sulzbacher counts first came into the possession of the Hohenstaufen. Derived from the previously used name of this dynasty, the castle Hohenstein is now sometimes referred to as Hohenstaufen Castle. Later it became then, still in the possession of the Wittelsbach, the Luxembourg and at the end, back into the hands of the Bavarian dukes.

== Transition to the imperial city of Nuremberg ==
In connection with the Landshut War of Succession, finally the imperial city of Nuremberg was in secure control of the castle and bought it in the 1505 sale. Subsequently, they then played an important role in the further history of Nuremberg. It was designated as the administrative seat of a Nuremberg keeper and played a prominent role in the management and defense of the Nuremberg newly acquired land area. This was, however, its half a century later in the Second Margrave War undoing. For the troops of the Niirnberg arch enemy, the Margrave of Brandenburg-Kulmbach Albrecht Alcibiades of Brandenburg-Kulmbach, for Nuremberg was so important fortress and destroy take. Despite heavy devastation could be in this war then in the end but still said the imperial city and its allies against the Marquis. The Burg Hohenstein subsequently remained unchallenged possession in Nuremberg and was subsequently rebuilt, which, however, to the 17th century went.

One figure in the history of Hohenberg Castle is Werner von Parsberg (d. 1455). Parsberg was a noblemen who fought on behalf of the town of Nuremberg, often fighting against other nobles. Parsberg took the lordship of Hohenstein castle, which was located near Nuremberg.

== Decline ==
The decisive break in the castle's history took place in 1806, when the story took place at Nuremberg as Imperial City to an end. Together with the rest of the land area of Nuremberg and the city itself, it was this year when the Kingdom of Bavaria took possession. Thus began the decline of the castle in its beginning, because parts of the castle have now been sold by the state for demolition. The castle was degraded to the quarry, and including the castle keep, fell victim to this misuse. It was not until about the middle of the 19th century, there began some rethinking, and there were attempts made to halt the further deterioration to stop now. The previous measures, however, had already caused too many substantial interventions to progress, so that the castle is still a semi-ruin.

== Modern era ==
Hohenstein Castle has taken many forms in the more recent past. In 1946, for instance, it became home to a textile school.

== Gallery ==
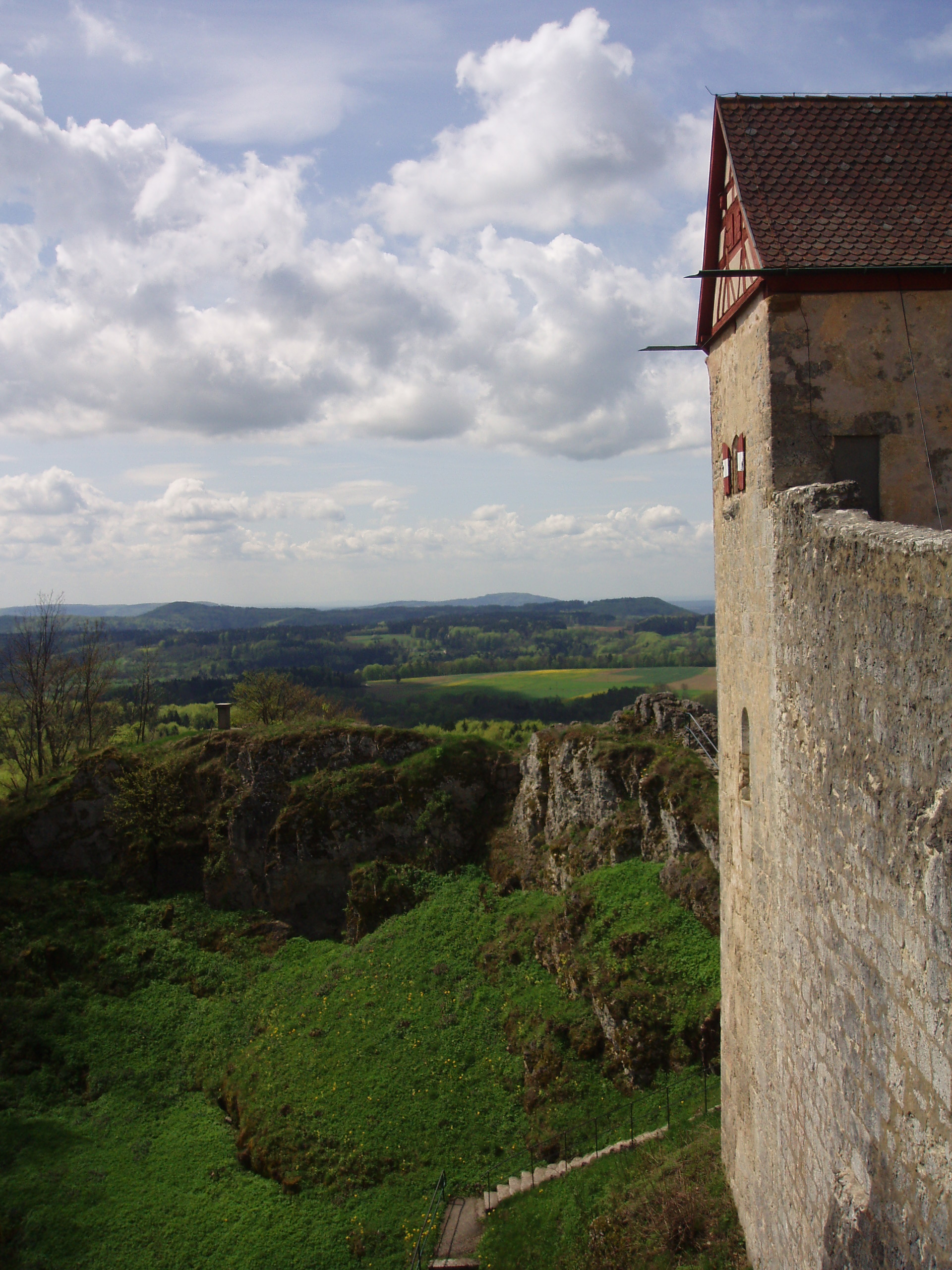
View of the valley

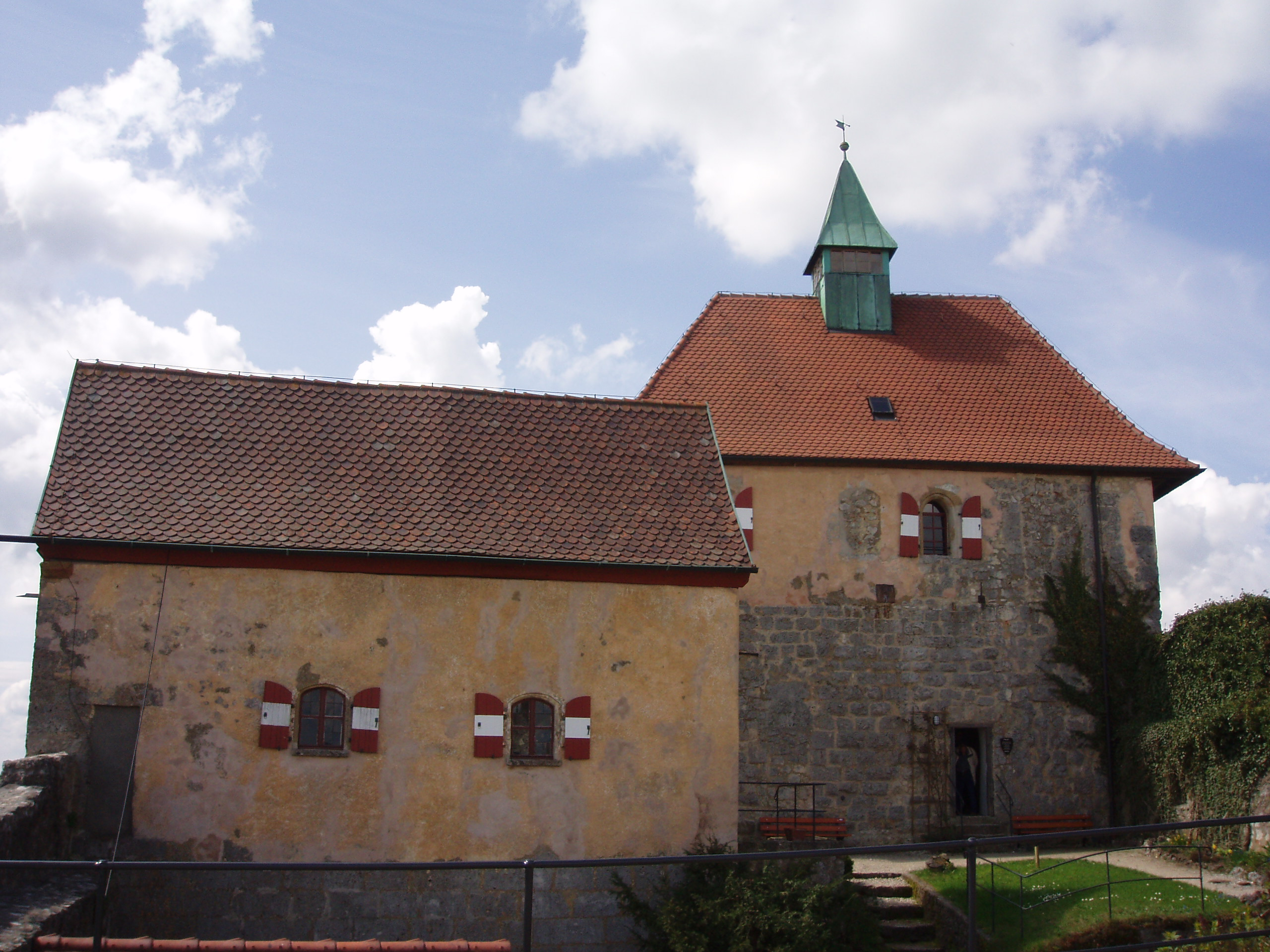
Chapel and palace

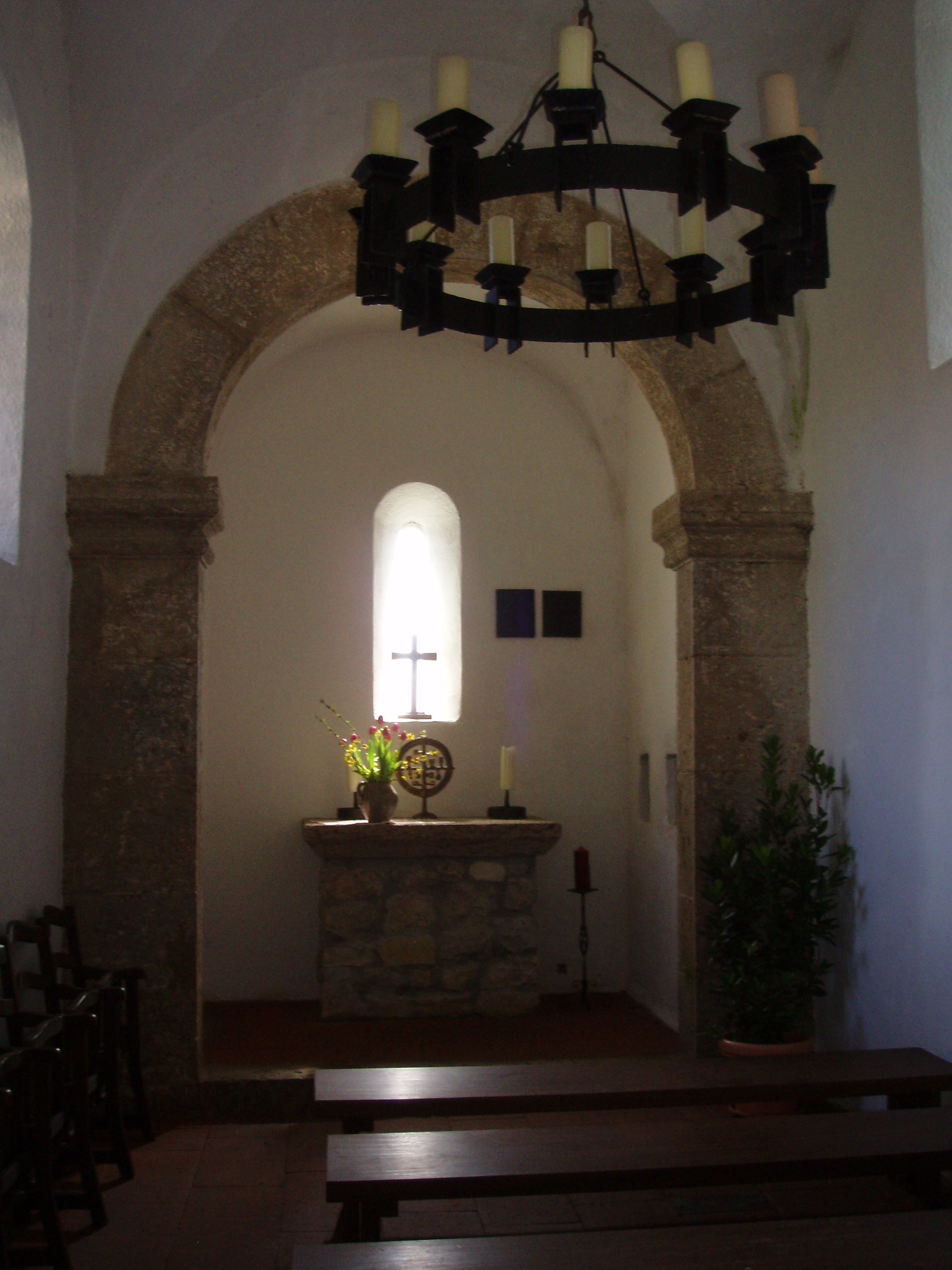
Interior of the chapel

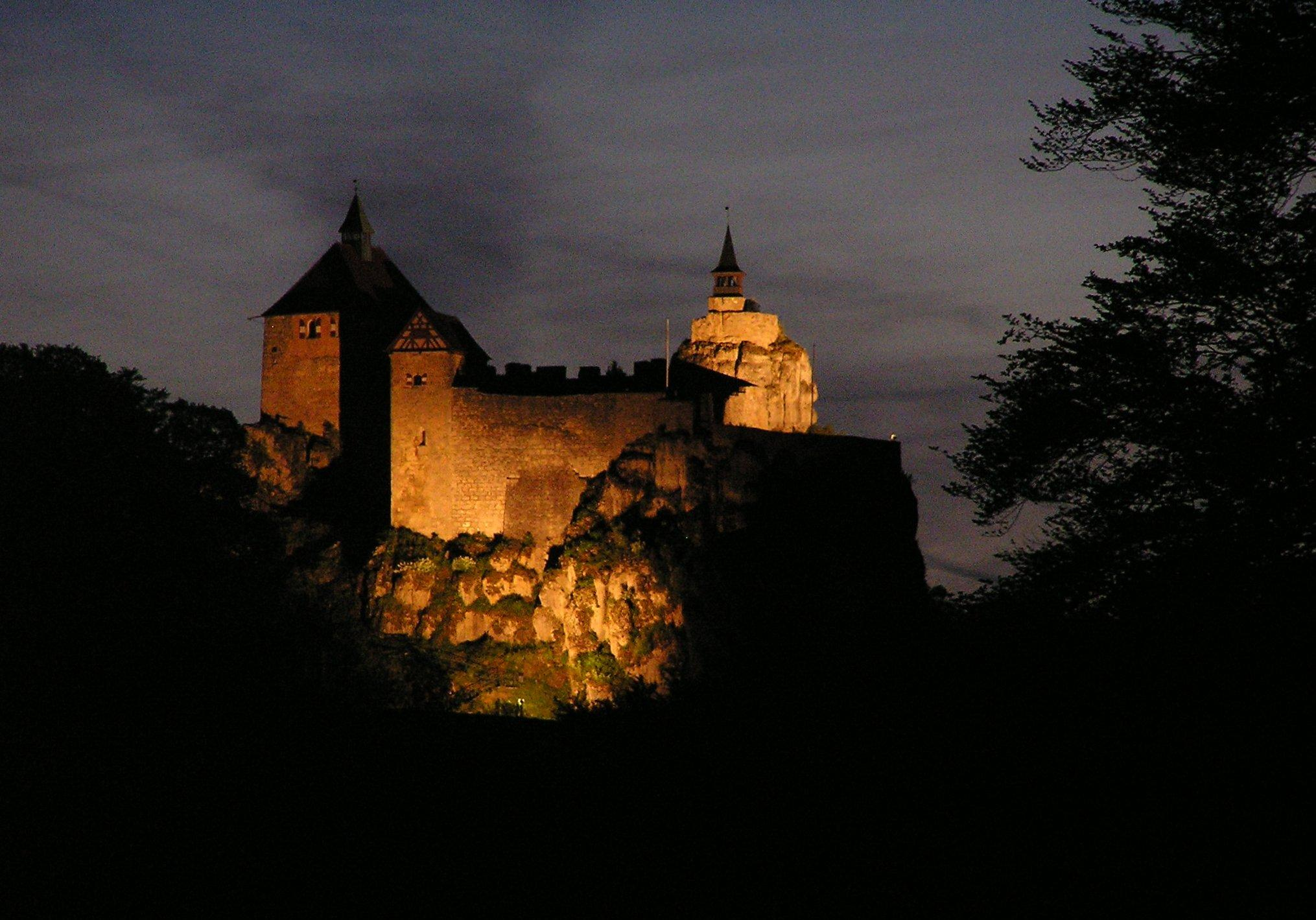
The castle in the evening light
