= Schnaittach =

- Municipality
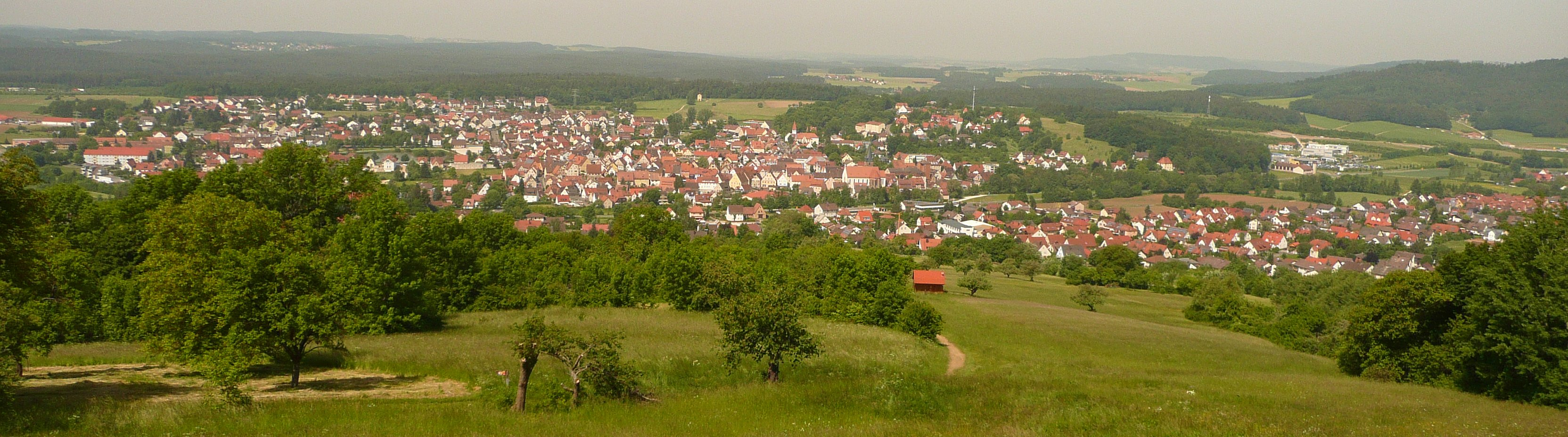
- Schnaittach seen from the Rothenberg Fortress

- Coat of arms

- Location of Schnaittach within Nürnberger Land district
- Interactive map of Schnaittach
- Location within Germany Location within Bavaria
- Coordinates: 49°33′33″N 11°20′35″E
- Country: Germany
- State: Bavaria
- Admin. region: Mittelfranken
- District: Nürnberger Land
- Subdivisions: 33 parts

Government
  - Mayor (2020–26): Frank Pitterlein (CSU)

Area
  - Total: 49.34 km^{2} (19.05 sq mi)
- Elevation: 355 m (1,165 ft)

Population (2025-12-31)
  - Total: 8,538
  - Density: 173.0/km^{2} (448.2/sq mi)
- Time zone: UTC+01:00 (CET)
  - Summer (DST): UTC+02:00 (CEST)
- Postal codes: 91220
- Dialling codes: 09153
- Vehicle registration: LAU, ESB, HEB, N, PEG
- Website: www.schnaittach.de

Schnaittach (German pronunciation: [ˈʃnaɪtax]) is a market town in Middle Franconia, Bavaria, Germany.

== Geography ==
Schnaittach is on the river Schnaittach, a tributary of the Pegnitz.

== History ==
Schnaittach was first mentioned in 1011. Until 1806 the Christian population of Schnaittach was Catholic, in contrast to the surrounding areas. Schnaittach has had a large Jewish community since the 15th century. Today, the building complex of the synagogue houses a branch of the Jewish Museum of Franconia (the main museum is in Fürth).

== Twin towns ==
- Twinned with Frohnleiten, Austria
- "Friendship" with Schlettau, Saxony
