= Zipser Mühlbach =

River in Germany

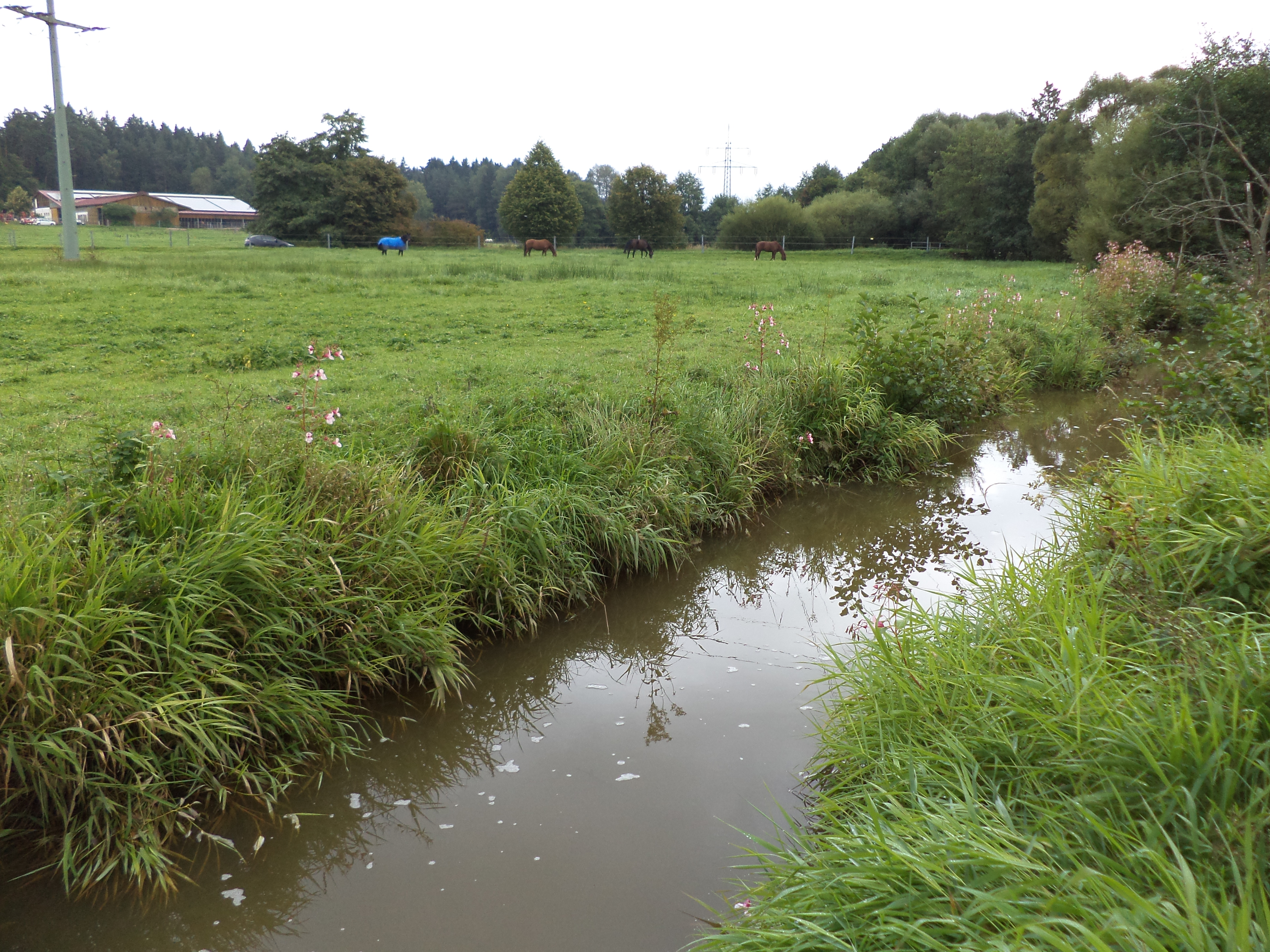
- The Zipser Mühlbach at the Haidmühle

- Mouth of Zipser Mühlbach

Location
- Country: Germany
- State: Bavaria

Physical characteristics
- Mouth
  - location: Fichtenohe
  - coordinates: 49.7802°N 11.5483°E
- Length: 5.0 km (3.1 mi)

Basin features
- Progression: Fichtenohe→ Pegnitz→ Regnitz→ Main→ Rhine→ North Sea

The Zipser Mühlbach is a small river in Bavaria, Germany. It flows into the Fichtenohe north of the town Pegnitz.

== See also ==
- List of rivers of Bavaria
