= Högenbach =

River in Germany

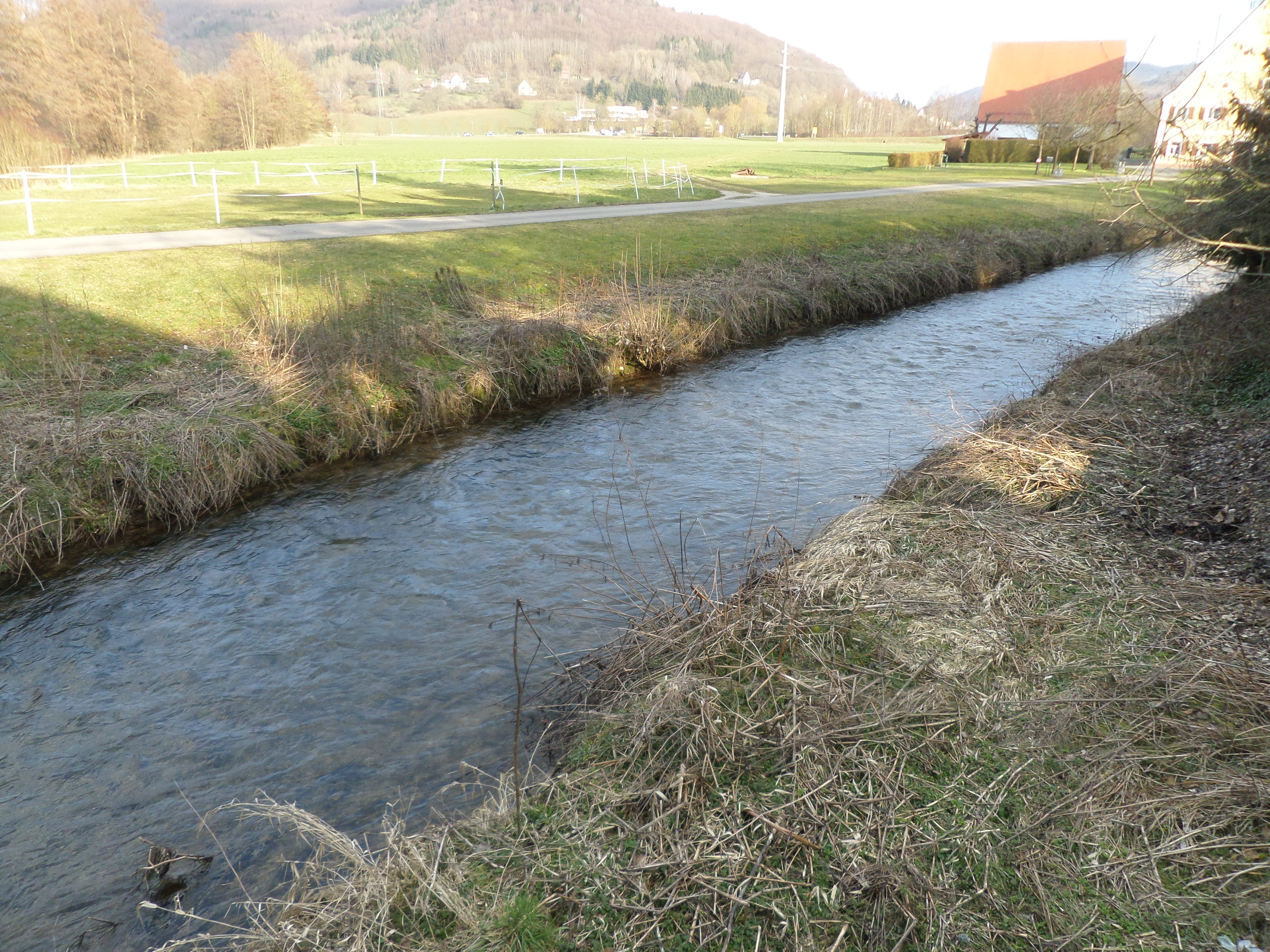
- The Högenbach shortly before its mouth

Location
- Country: Germany
- State: Bavaria

Physical characteristics
- Mouth
  - location: Pegnitz
  - coordinates: 49.5091°N 11.4832°E
- Length: 20.6 km (12.8 mi)

Basin features
- Progression: Pegnitz→ Regnitz→ Main→ Rhine→ North Sea

Högenbach is a river of Bavaria, Germany. It flows into the Pegnitz, near Pommelsbrunn.

== See also ==
- List of rivers of Bavaria
