= Afterlehen =

An Afterlehen or Afterlehn (plural: Afterlehne, Afterlehen) is a German term for a fief that a liege lord has himself been given as a fief and then, in turn, enfeoffed wholly or partially to one or more lesser vassals. It is variously referred to in English as a mesne-fief or mesne-tenure, an arriere-fief or subfief, under-tenure or mesnalty.

Within the feudal system of the Holy Roman Empire, these mesne fiefs became inheritable over time and could have up to five "stations" between the actual holder of the fief and the overarching liege lord.

An example of an Afterlehen is Rothenberg Castle in Bavaria, Germany.

== See also ==
- Mesne lord

== Literature ==
- Jürgen Dendorfer/ Roman Deutinger (eds.): Das Lehnswesen im Hochmittelalter. Forschungskonstrukte – Quellenbefunde – Deutungsrelevanz. Thorbecke, Ostfildern, 2010, ISBN 978-3-7995-4286-9 (Review)
- Fahrenkrüger, Johann Anton: Nathan Bailey's Dictionary English-German and German-English — Englisch-Deutsches und Deutsch-Englisches Wörterbuch. Gänzlich umgearbeitet. Zweiter Theil. Deutsch-Englisch. Zehnte, verbesserte und vermehrte, Auflage., Friedrich Frommann, Leipzig und Jena 1801 (in German and English)
- François Louis Ganshof: Was ist das Lehnswesen?, 7th edn., Wissenschaftliche Buchgesellschaft, Darmstadt, 1989. ISBN 3-534-00927-4
- Karl-Heinz Spieß: Stichwort „Lehn(s)recht, Lehnswesen.“ In: Handwörterbuch zur deutschen Rechtsgeschichte. Vol. 2, Berlin, 1978. Sp. 1725–1741
- Karl-Heinz Spieß: Das Lehnswesen in Deutschland im hohen und späten Mittelalter. 2nd improved and expanded edition, Steiner, Stuttgart, 2009, ISBN 978-3-515-09180-0
