= Sittenbach =

River in Germany

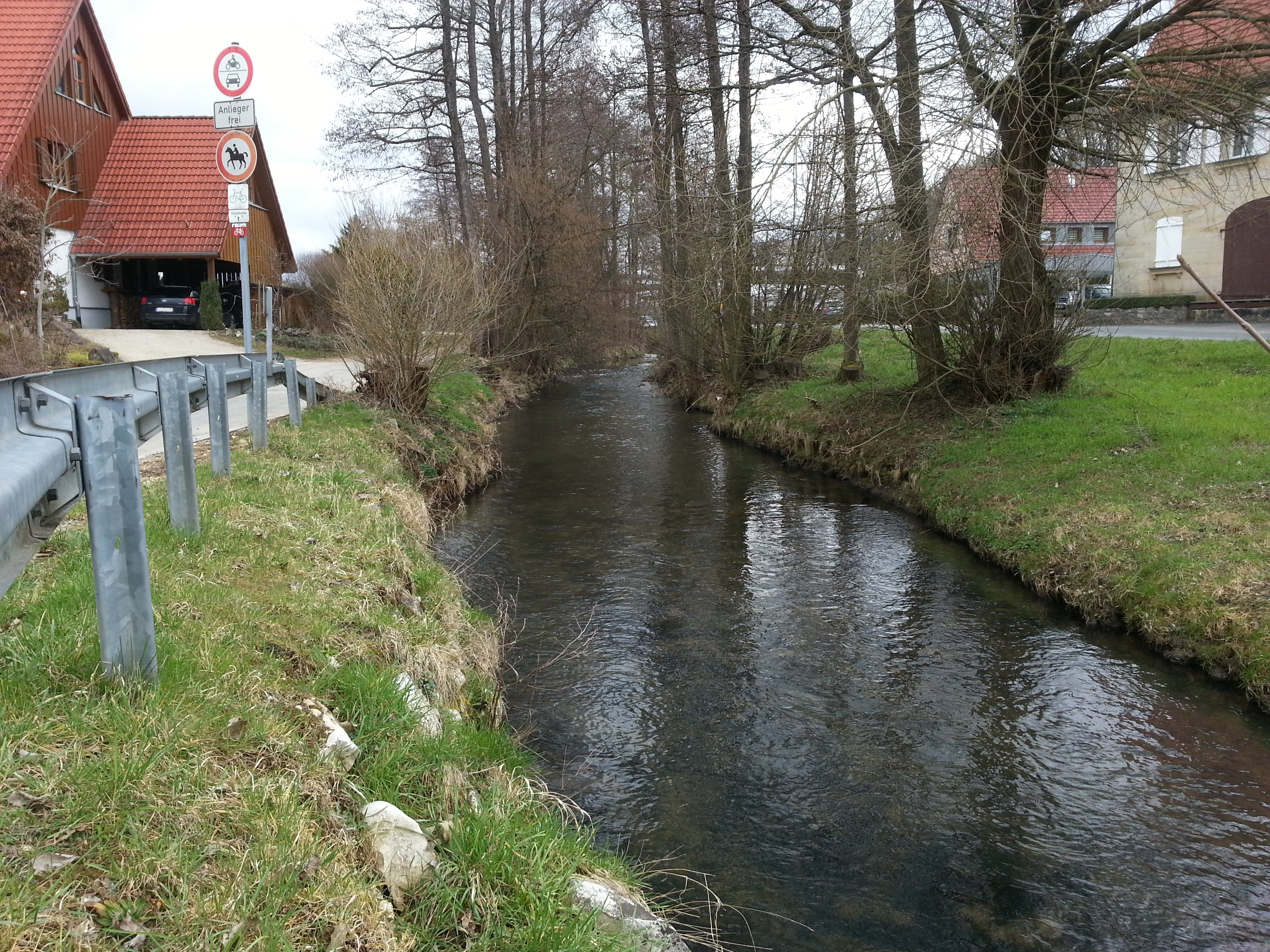
- The Sittenbach in Altensittenbach, a borough of Hersbruck, looking upstream

Location
- Country: Germany
- State: Bavaria

Physical characteristics
- Mouth
  - location: Pegnitz
  - coordinates: 49.5058°N 11.4083°E
- Length: 12.1 km (7.5 mi)

Basin features
- Progression: Pegnitz→ Regnitz→ Main→ Rhine→ North Sea

Sittenbach is a river of Bavaria, Germany. It flows into the Pegnitz near Hersbruck.

== See also ==
- List of rivers of Bavaria
