= Chain Bridge (Nuremberg) =

Chain Bridge Kettensteg
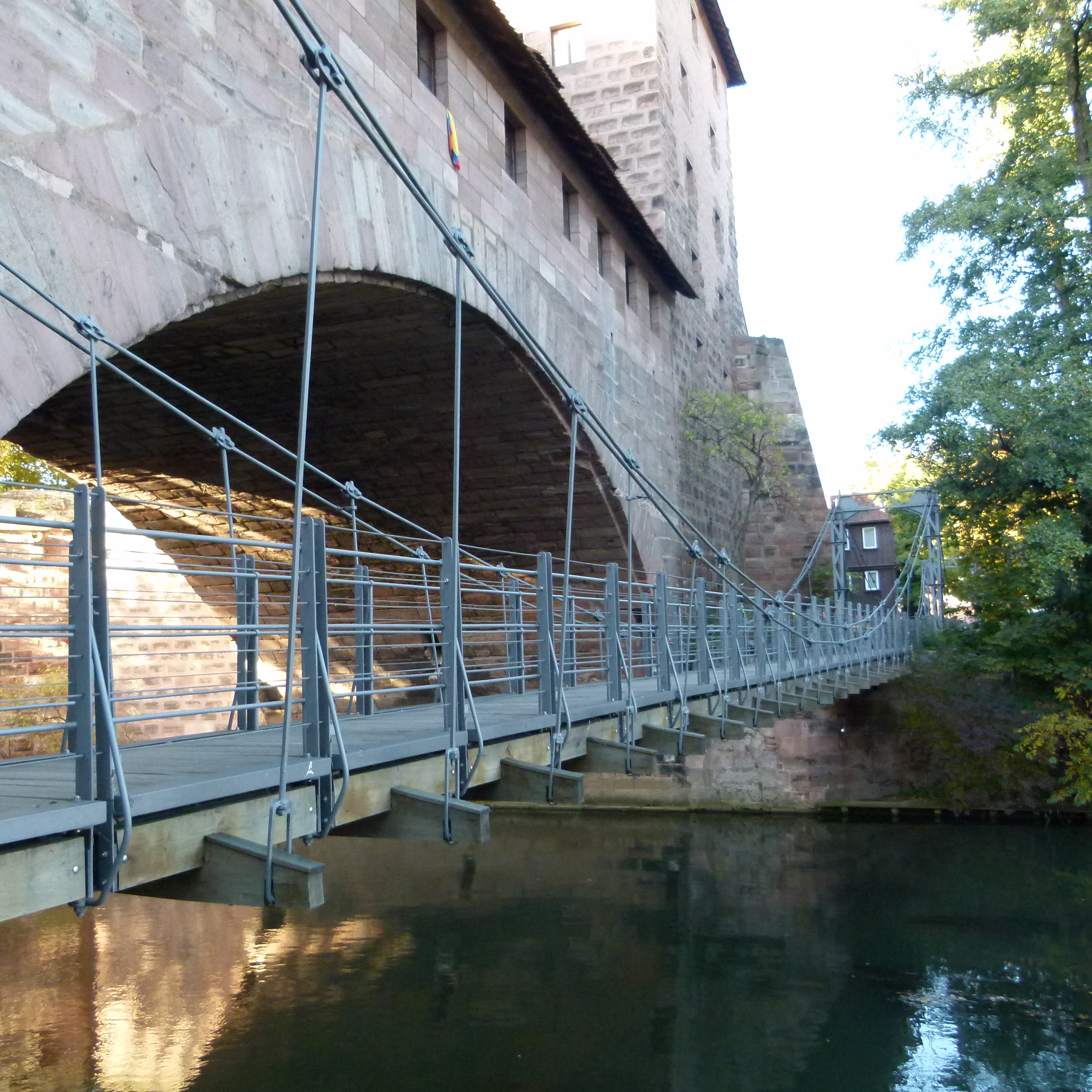
- Coordinates: 49°27′14.8″N 11°04′14.83″E
- Carries: pedestrians
- Crosses: Pegnitz
- Locale: Nuremberg, Germany

Characteristics
- Design: Chain bridge
- Material: Wrought iron
- Total length: 68 m
- Longest span: 33 m
- No. of spans: two

History
- Designer: Conrad Georg Kuppler
- Construction start: 1824
- Construction end: 1824
- Inaugurated: December 30, 1824

Location
- Interactive map of Chain Bridge

The Chain Bridge (German: Kettensteg) is a pedestrian chain bridge in Nuremberg, Germany. The bridge crosses the river Pegnitz just a few meters upriver of Fronveste and Schlayerturm, fortifications in the course of the medieval city wall guarding the river's exit from the town. It connects Maxplatz in Sebalder Altstadt (the old quarter north of the river) with Untere Kreuzgasse in Lorenz, the quarter on the south side of the river.

The Chain Bridge was built in 1824 and is thus the oldest surviving chain bridge on the European continent. It was not given any specific name, but the public used to call it by what it appeared to be: a narrow pedestrian bridge (German: Steg) with chains (German: Ketten).

The bridge has two spans of 33 m each and a total length of 68 m. On either side, there are two strands of wrought iron eyebars, originally supported by three wooden towers standing on the banks of the river and on the small island, and anchored in solid masonry blocks on either side. The wooden deck was suspended from the chains by hangers, also of wrought iron.

The wooden towers were damaged by the very high floods of 1909 and, thereafter, replaced by towers of iron trusses still in existence.

As in most early suspension bridges, its bridge deck was not stiff and easily developed swaying motions under the steps of the pedestrians—and some youths enjoyed provoking the swaying on purpose. Eventually, in 1927 a police ordinance was issued in order to stop such dangerous actions. In 1930, the bridge deck was stiffened by steel girders and wooden piles were placed in the river supporting the deck. In the Nazi era, the official opinion was to remove it altogether, which was only prevented by the outbreak of war in 1939.

In 2009, the wooden piles were not safe any more and the bridge had to be closed. Substantial donations of citizens and local companies allowed a complete reconstruction, using as much as possible of the original structure and reinstating the suspension bridge structure without any other supports. The renewed wooden deck was stiffened by integrating a flat steel box girder into it, which is hardly visible. On 22 December 2010 the bridge was reopened to pedestrian use.
