= Goldbach (Pegnitz) =

River in Germany

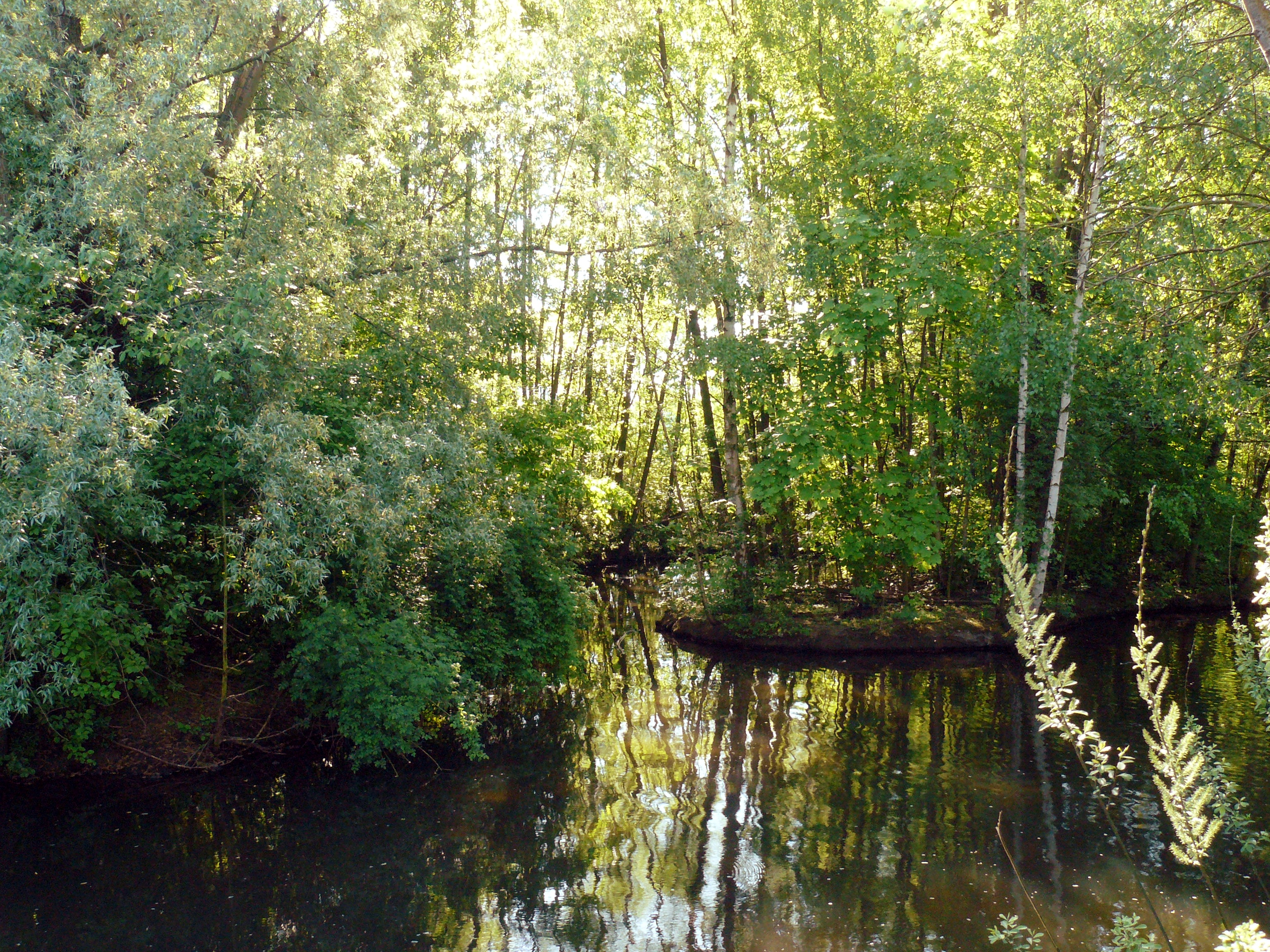
- The Goldbach shortly before its mouth

Location
- Country: Germany
- States: Bavaria

Physical characteristics
- Mouth
  - location: Pegnitz
  - coordinates: 49.4519°N 11.0866°E

Basin features
- Progression: Pegnitz→ Regnitz→ Main→ Rhine→ North Sea

Goldbach (German pronunciation: [ˈɡɔltbax]) is a small river of Bavaria, Germany. It is a tributary of the Pegnitz in Nuremberg.

== See also ==
- List of rivers of Bavaria
