= Hersbruck =

- Town
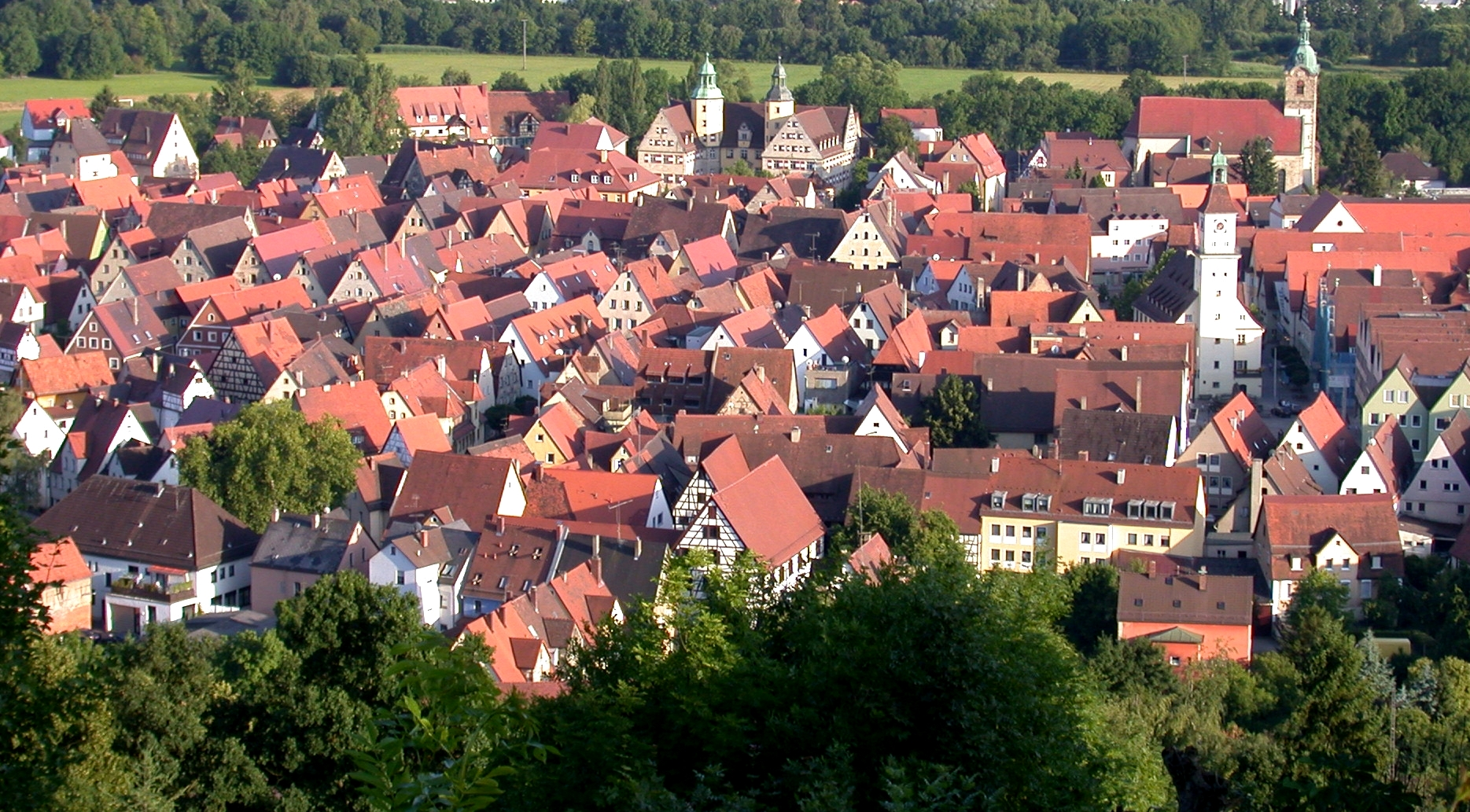
- Historical centre of Hersbruck

- Coat of arms

- Location of Hersbruck within Nürnberger Land district
- Interactive map of Hersbruck
- Location within Germany Location within Bavaria
- Coordinates: 49°30′29″N 11°25′58″E
- Country: Germany
- State: Bavaria
- Admin. region: Mittelfranken
- District: Nürnberger Land

Government
  - Mayor (2020–26): Robert Ilg

Area
  - Total: 22.91 km^{2} (8.85 sq mi)
- Elevation: 336 m (1,102 ft)

Population (2025-12-31)
  - Total: 12,261
  - Density: 535.2/km^{2} (1,386/sq mi)
- Time zone: UTC+01:00 (CET)
  - Summer (DST): UTC+02:00 (CEST)
- Postal codes: 91217
- Dialling codes: 09151
- Vehicle registration: LAU, ESB, HEB, N, PEG
- Website: www.hersbruck.de

Hersbruck (German pronunciation: [hɛʁsˈbʁʊk]) is a small town in Middle Franconia, Bavaria, Germany, belonging to the district Nürnberger Land. It is best known for the late-gothic artwork of the Hersbruck altar, the "Hirtenmuseum" and the landscape of Hersbruck Switzerland.

== History ==
Hersbruck was founded in 976 when a castle was built there near a bridge. The name probably comes from Haderihesprucga, the bridge of Haderich.

In the Middle Ages the Golden Route from Nuremberg to Prague passed through the town, which brought prosperity. In 1297 Hersbruck was given municipal rights, after 1504 the town belonged to the area of the free imperial town Nuremberg and in 1806 became Bavarian. Hersbruck was the birthplace, in 1673, of Jacob Paul von Gundling, the famous and unfortunate historian at the court of Brandenburg-Prussia.

During the Nazi regime, Hersbruck contained a subsidiary camp of Flossenbürg concentration camp. The camp had about 10,000 prisoners, about 4,000 of them died in Hersbruck.

After World War II, that camp, on the outskirts of town, was converted for housing Latvian Displaced Persons and renamed as Camp Kathann. It was first operated by United Nations Relief and Rehabilitation Administration and later by International Refugee Organization.

Today, the whole area where the camp used to be has been completely redeveloped. In 2007 the monument Ohne Namen (Without names) by Vittore Bocchetta has been erected in the Rosengarten close to the camp site. The artist, one of the Italian political deportees, had managed to escape in April 1945 during one of the death marches from Hersbruck to Dachau, when the camp was evacuated by the Nazis with the approach of U.S. forces.

== Suburbs ==
- Altensittenbach
- Kühnhofen
- Ellenbach
- Weiher
- Leutenbach
- Großviehberg

== Partner community ==
- (United Kingdom) Lossiemouth (Moray, UK), since 1972
- (Italy) San Daniele del Friuli, since 2008
- Hilterfingen (Switzerland), since 2012

== Culture ==
The Deutsches Hirtenmuseum, the only museum in Germany which shows the working and living conditions of herdsmen, is in Hersbruck.

== Recreation ==
In 2004 the Frankenalb-Therme (http://www.frankenalbtherme.de) was opened. It offers a thermal bath and a recreational bathing area with a waterslide (length 82 m), plus a large sauna area including several outdoor saunas.

== Notable people ==
- Nikolaus Selnecker (1530−1592), German musician and theologian
- Walter Schultze (1894–1979), German physician and Nazi Party official
- Günther Beckstein (born 1943), German politician
- Melanie Skotnik (born 1982), French-German high jumper
