= Schnaittach (Pegnitz) =

River in Germany

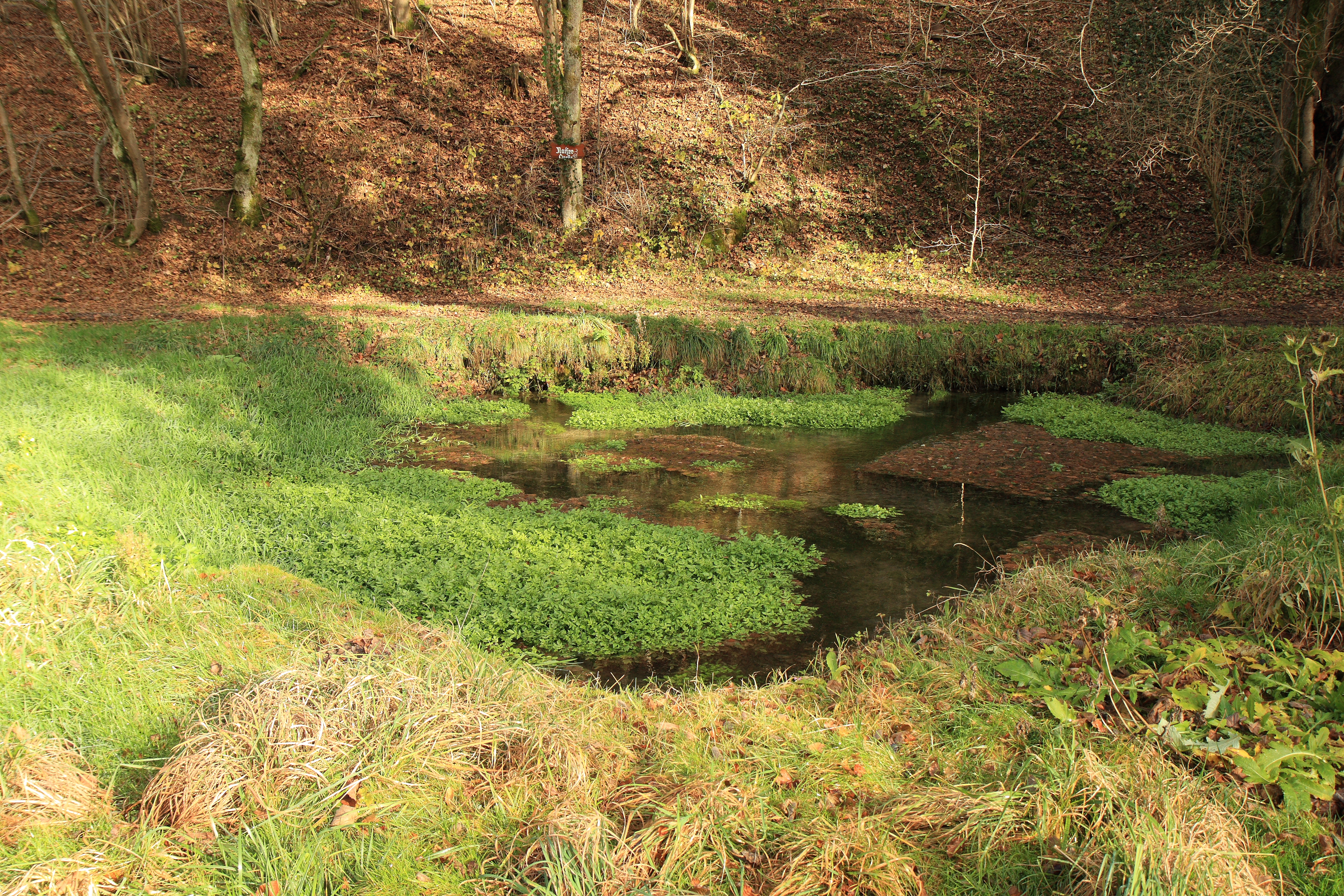
- Source of the Naifer Bach

Location
- Country: Germany
- State: Bavaria

Physical characteristics
- Mouth
  - location: Pegnitz
  - coordinates: 49.5142°N 11.3222°E
- Length: 17.4 km (10.8 mi)

Basin features
- Progression: Pegnitz→ Regnitz→ Main→ Rhine→ North Sea

Schnaittach (German pronunciation: [ˈʃnaɪtax]; in its upper course before the confluence with the Ittlinger Bach: Naifer Bach) is a river of Bavaria, Germany. It is a right tributary of the Pegnitz near Neunkirchen am Sand. It passes through the town Schnaittach.

== See also ==
- List of rivers of Bavaria
