= Fichtenohe =

River in Germany

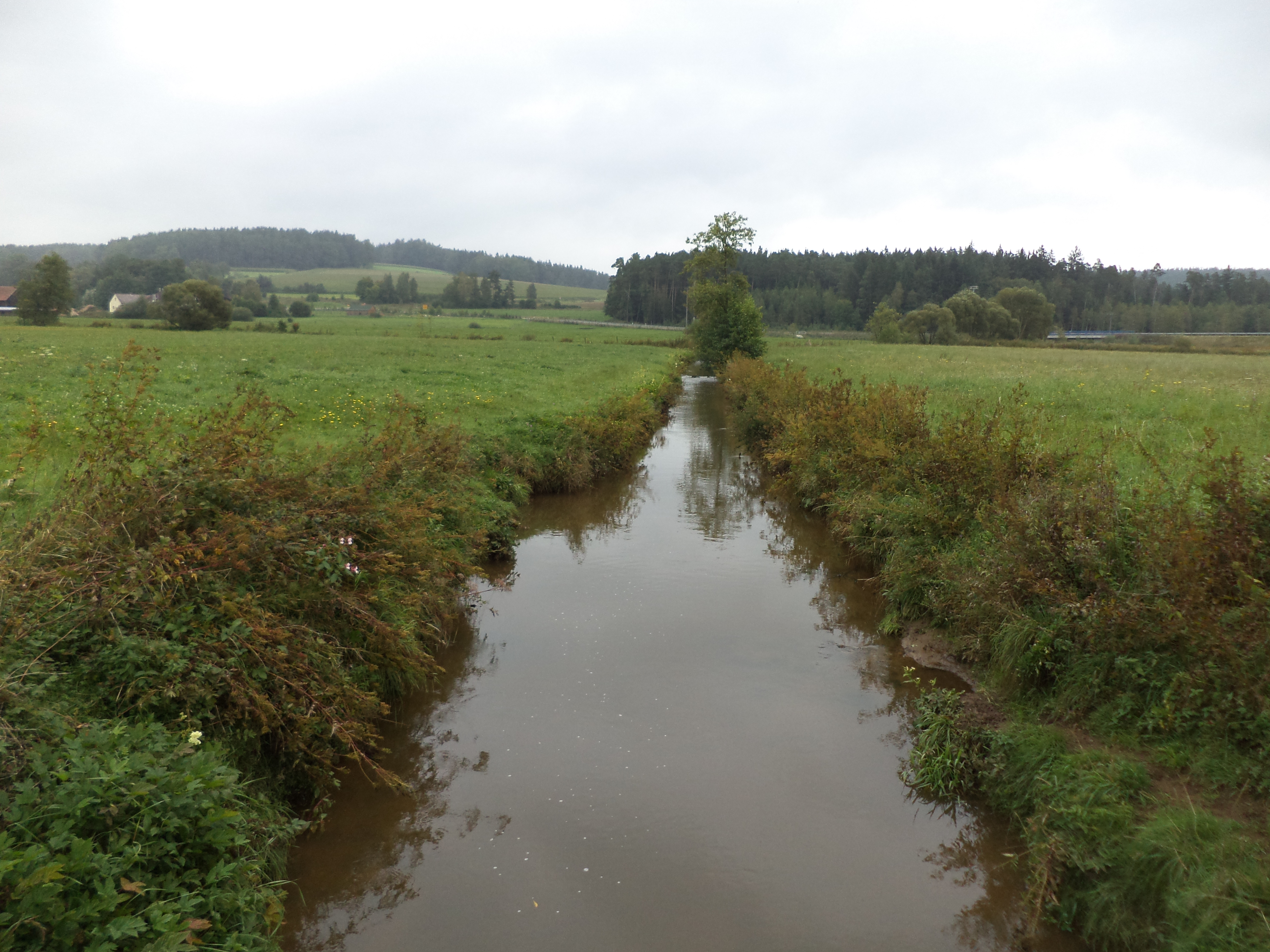
- The Fichtenohe north of the town Pegnitz

Location
- Country: Germany
- State: Bavaria

Physical characteristics
- Mouth
  - location: Pegnitz
  - coordinates: 49.7573°N 11.5382°E
- Length: 14.7 km (9.1 mi)

Basin features
- Progression: Pegnitz→ Regnitz→ Main→ Rhine→ North Sea
- Tributaries
  - left: Zipser Mühlbach

The Fichtenohe is a river of Bavaria, Germany. It flows into the Pegnitz in the town Pegnitz. It is also considered the upper course of the Pegnitz.

== See also ==
- List of rivers of Bavaria
