= Weihergraben (Altmühl) =

River in Germany

Location
- Country: Germany
- State: Bavaria

Physical characteristics
- Mouth
  - location: Altmühl
  - coordinates: 49.0327°N 10.8532°E

Basin features
- Progression: Altmühl→ Danube→ Black Sea

The Weihergraben is a small river of Bavaria, Germany. It is a left tributary of the Altmühl near Alesheim.

== See also ==
- List of rivers of Bavaria
