= Rothenberg Fortress =

Coordinates: 49°33′16″N 11°21′36″E

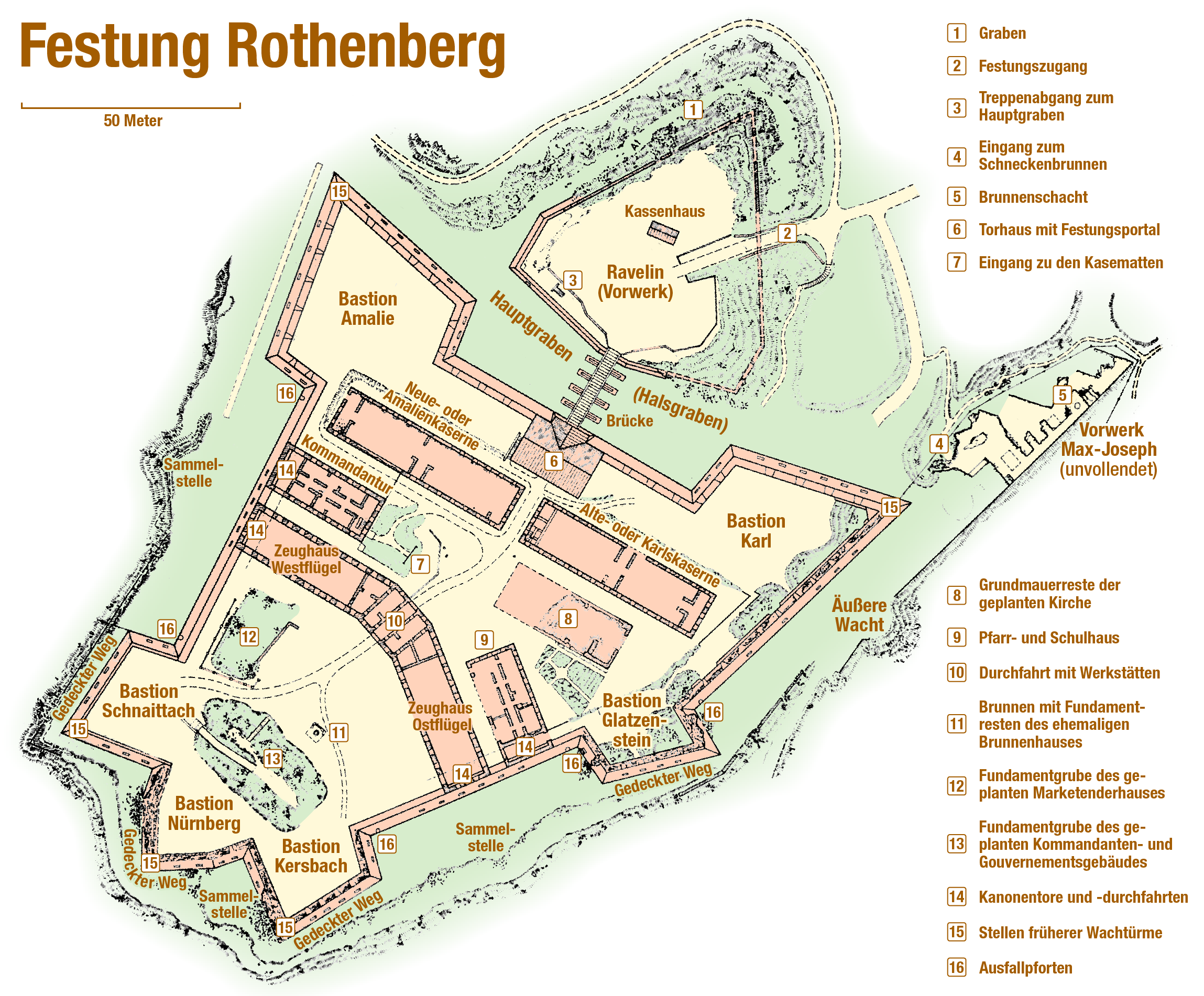
Plan of the fortress

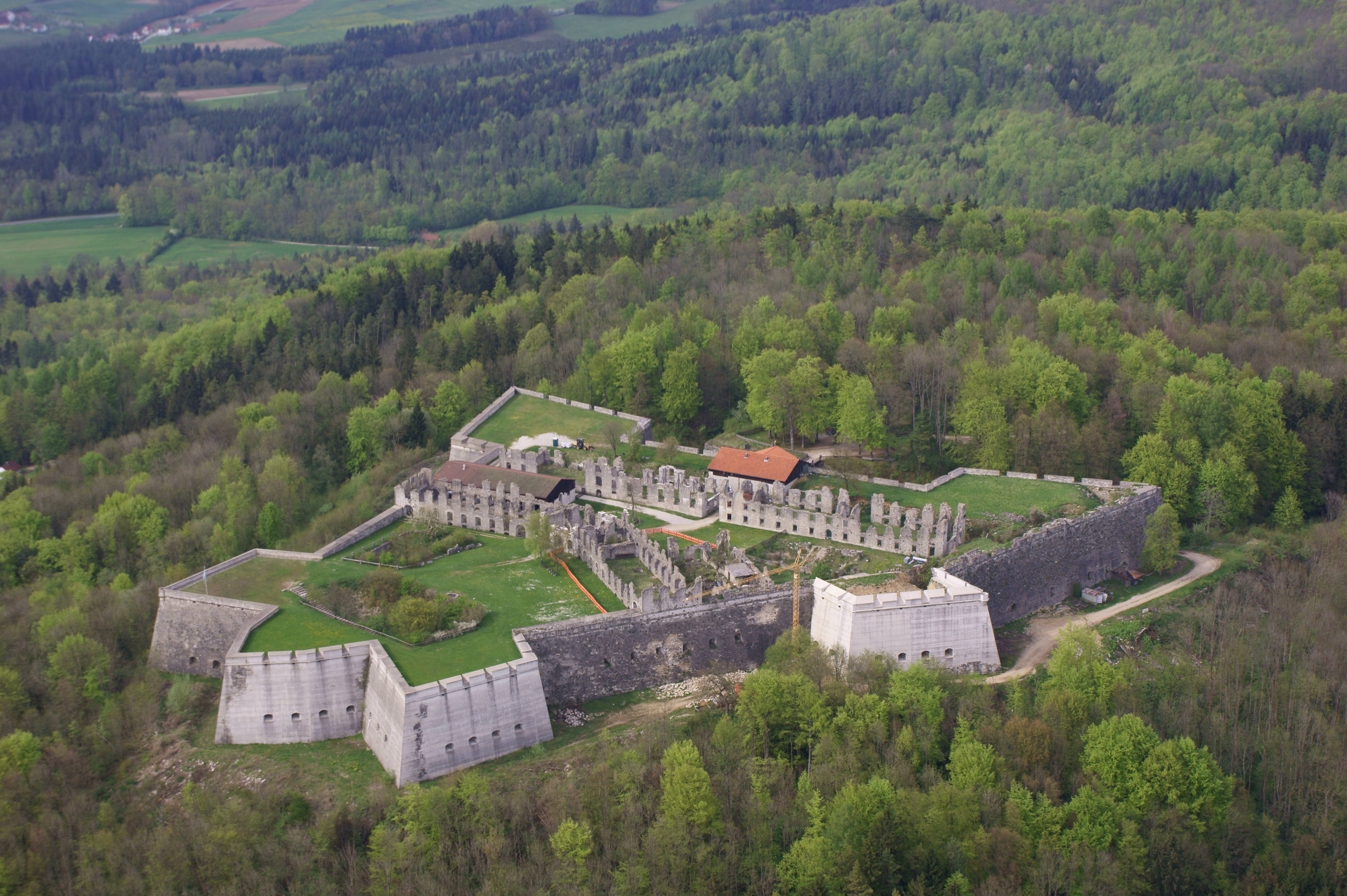
Rothenberg Fortress from the west

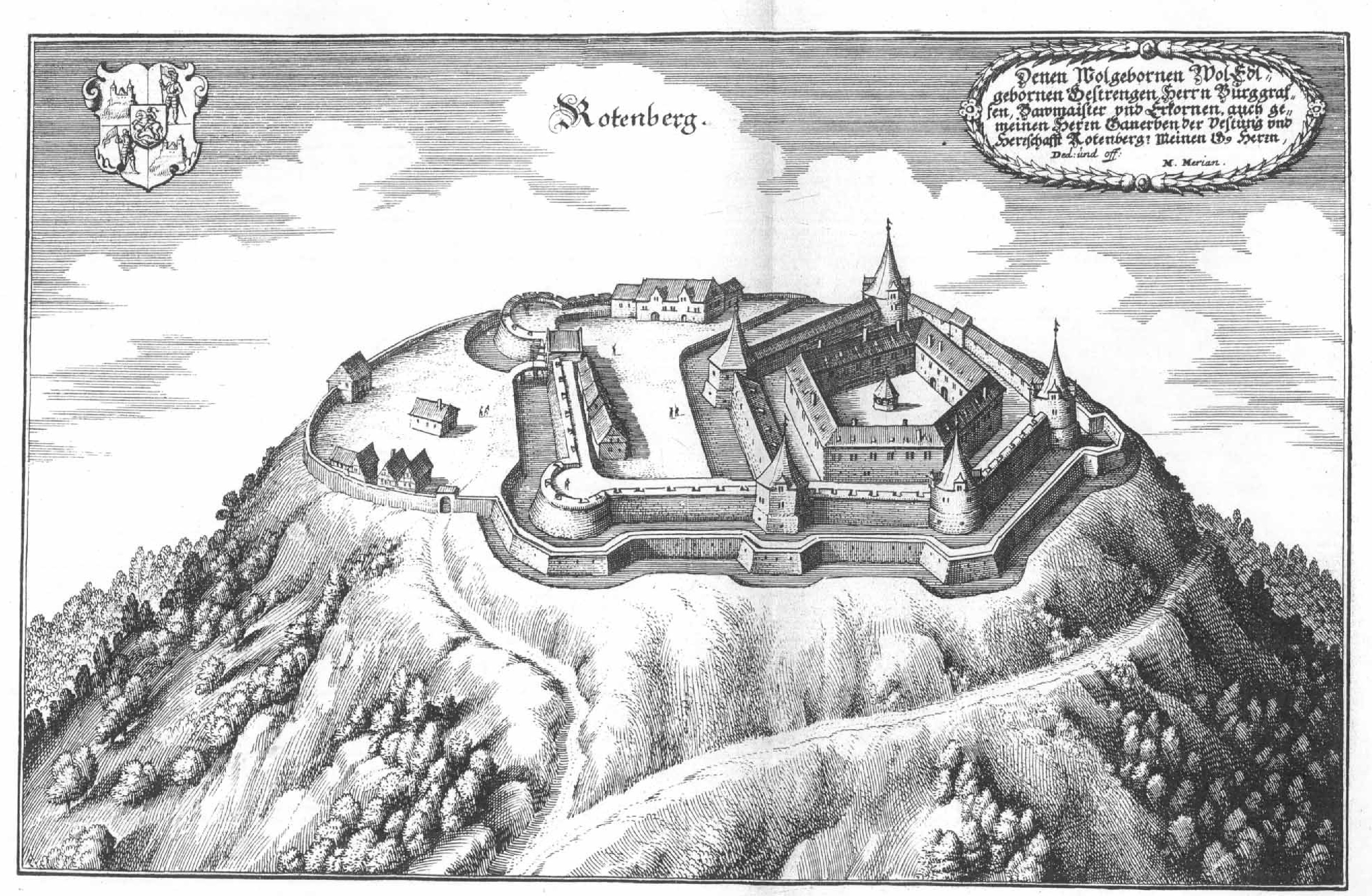
The earlier castle on the Rothenberg (Matthäus Merian: Topographia Franconiae, 1648)

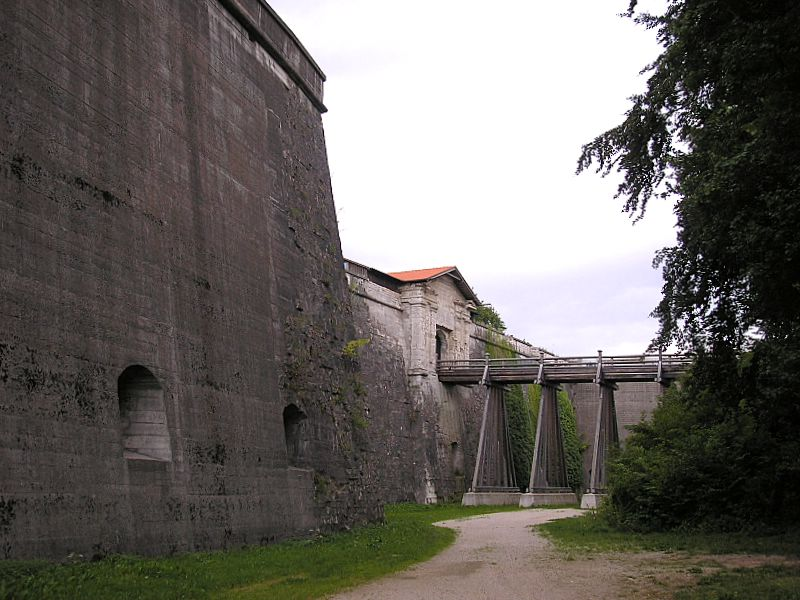
Moat, bridge and gate

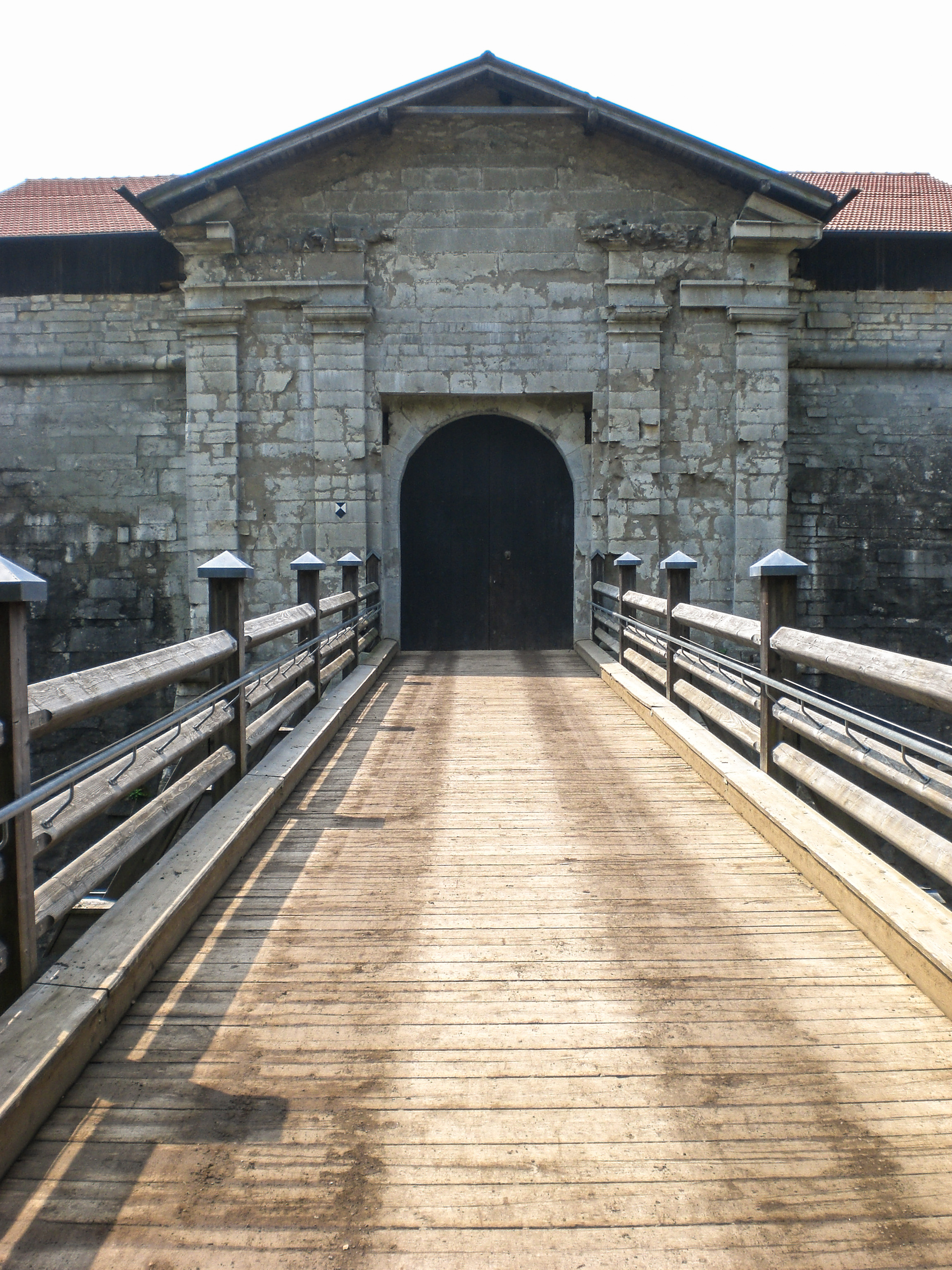
Gate

Rothenberg Fortress (German: Festung Rothenberg) is a fortress on the eponymous hill, 588 m, near Schnaittach in the Franconian Jura.

== Beginnings ==
The first fortifications were probably built between 1300 and 1330 by Dietrich von Wildenstein. He sold it in 1360 to the emperor and Bohemian king, Charles IV, who had the fort upgraded into a border castle in order to protect his Bohemian allodial estate.

== Ganerbenburg ==
In 1478, Count Palatine Otto II set the condition for Rothenberg Castle to become a joint-fief or Ganerbenburg. 44 co-vassals who, together with the town of Rothenberg and market town of Schnaittach, acquired the castle as a so-called mesne fief or Afterlehen, were given relatively little property and few rights, but the community of co-vassals formed a strong alliance to which other members of noble families in the area could be attached. The castle also had several rights of patronage in the Nuremberg area. The community of co-vassals had the characteristics of a type of union called an Einung. At the time of Silvester von Schaumberg, the castle was a "wasp's nest" with which even princes feared to fall out.

The community of co-heirs nominated a burgrave.

- Heinz von Guttenberg, 1483
- Lamprecht von Seckendorff, called Rinhofen, 1487
- Hans Zollner von Rottenstein, 1487
- Dietz von Heßberg, 1488
- Jacob Stiebar zum Regensberg, 1494
- Konrad Schott von Schottenstein, 1497
- Albrecht Stiebar, 1499
- Christoff von Sparneck, 1502
- Albrecht Gotsmann, 1505
- Hans von der Thann, 1508
- Sixt von Seckendorff, 1509
- Sebastian Stiebar, 1512
- Hans Stiebar, 1537
- Wolf Adolf von Waldenfels, 1546
- Sigmund von Failtsch (Feilitzsch?), 1549
- Sebastian Erlbeck, 1553
- Hans Ludwig von Eyb, 1553
- Hans Ludwig von Schaumburg, 1569
- Balthasar von Seckendorff, 1580
- Hans von Steinau, 1585
- Georg Sebastian Stiebar, 1604
- Joachim Christoff von Seckendorff, 1610
- Wolff Endres Stiebar, 1617
- Sebastian von Rotenhan, 1618

In 1703, the free imperial city of Nürnberg melted a golden ducat commemorating the conquest of Rothenberg Castle.

== Fortress ==
In the 18th century an important Rococo fortress, based on a French prototype, was built on the site by the Elector of Bavaria and German Emperor, Charles VII. Construction lasted from about 1729 to 1750. Two bastions were named after him and his wife, Maria Amalia. From time to time up to 400 soldiers were garrisoned here. It was built on an older and smaller fortification that was slighted, which in turn had been built on the remains of an even older ruined castle.

The site was built to geometric principles. Because they wanted to avoid blind spots, bastions were built to a star-shaped design. The overall plan was a polygon with a bastioned tower at each corner. The crest of the embankment was kept low in order to minimise the target area. The outer defences on the north side began with a gently rising glacis, followed by a covered way and a moat. Behind that, and scarcely higher than the glacis, rose the main rampart. This was designed to be difficult to shell because the wall was protected by the glacis. The site of the fortress on a hill ridge resembled that of medieval castles, that were often built on high points that were very difficult to access. In this case, the hillside thus protected the fortress to the south, east and west from being stormed, but not from the powerful siege guns of that time.

The fortress was built entirely of brickwork. This was sixteen metres high on all sides and had vaulting on the inside, ten metres high.

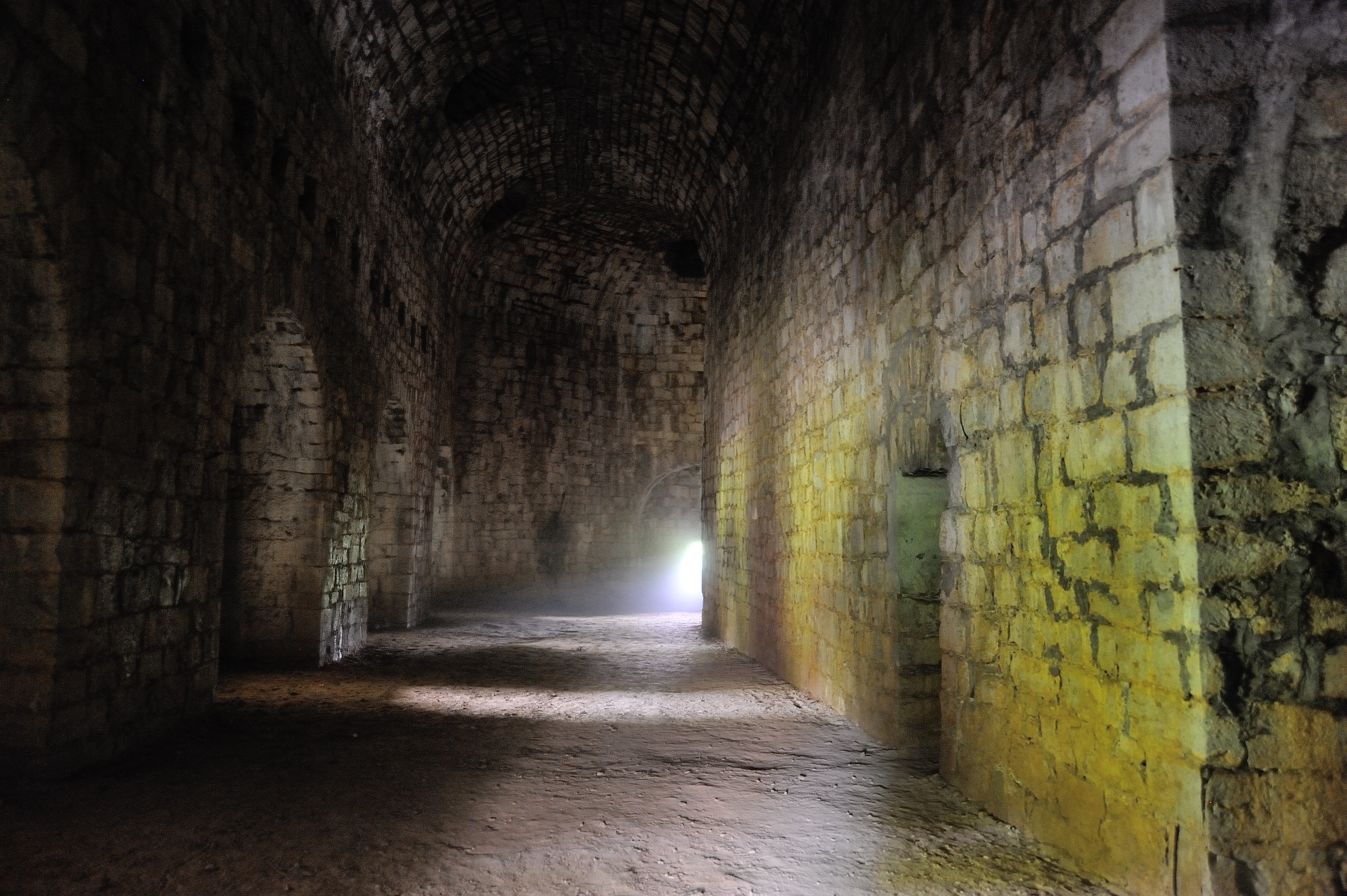
Inside the vaulted interior of Rothenberg Fortress

There were two, two-storey barrack buildings inside the fortress, an armoury, the garrison headquarters and a church. The garrison lived in the fortress with their families. Protected water supplies came from a fortress well and, later, by the Schneckenbrunnen well, built in 1759–67, in the counterguard outside the fortress. Built to counter the imperial city of Nuremberg only 25 kilometres away, the fortress was intended to guard the Bavarian border and the Electoral Bavarian enclave near Schnaittach from the city.

In 1806 Napoleon annexed Franconia to the Kingdom of Bavaria and Rothenberg then became superfluous to the Bavarian Army as a border fortress. It continued to be used, however, as a fortress prison.

In 1838 the Bavarian Minister of War sold the entire inventory, including doors, beams and everything that could be removed. The fortress was abandoned and fell into ruins. It was used as a quarry for the construction of Nuremberg Central Station. In 1876 explosive demolition testing was carried out on the ravelin.

The site may be visited as part of a guided tour. The underground casemates are out of bounds from November to April in order protect bats.

Southward of the ruins you can find a cemetery. 1083 people were buried on this place.

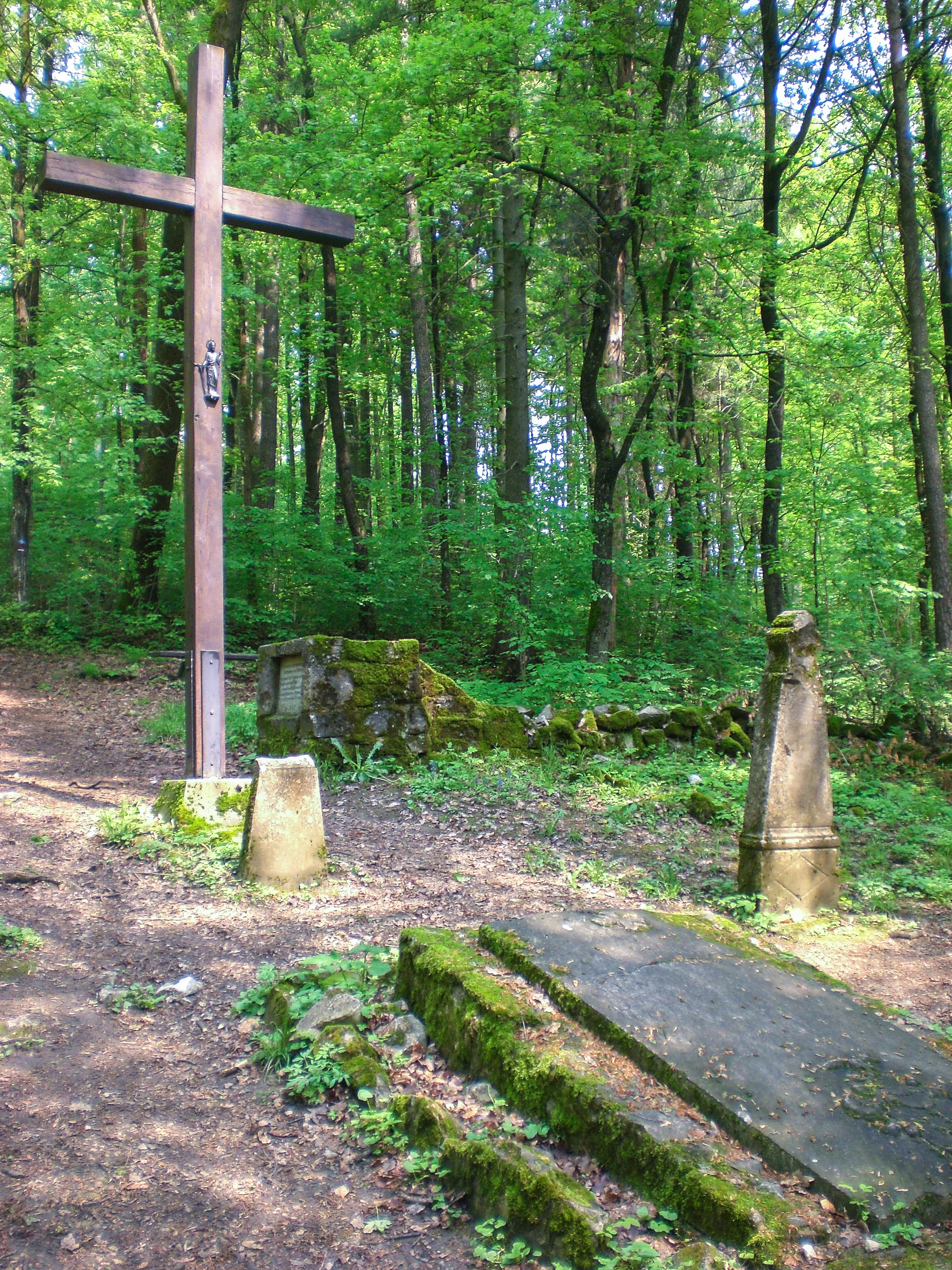
Cemetery

== Literature ==
- Johannes Müllner: Die Annalen der Reichsstadt Nürnberg von 1623, Teil II: Von 1351–1469. Nuremberg, 1972. pp. 30–35.
- Martin Schütz: Die Ganerbschaft Rothenberg. Nuremberg, 1924.
- Sven Thole: Die Festung Rothenberg - Der Festungsbau im 18. Jahrhundert, Maßnahmen der Erhaltung und Möglichkeiten der Konservierung. Dissertation, University of Bamberg, 2007 (full text)
- August Wörler: Veste und Festung Rothenberg. Heimat- und Geschichtsverein Neunkirchen am Sand, Neunkirchen am Sand, 2008 ISBN 978-3-00-025554-0
