= Middle Franconia =

Middle Franconia Mittelfranken (German)
- Regierungsbezirk
- Flag Coat of arms

- Map of Bavaria highlighting Middle Franconia (district)
- Country: Germany
- State: Bavaria
- Region seat: Ansbach

Government
  - District President: Peter Daniel Forster (CSU)

Area
  - Total: 7,245.70 km^{2} (2,797.58 sq mi)

Population (31 December 2025)
  - Total: 1,795,514
  - Density: 247.804/km^{2} (641.810/sq mi)

GDP
  - Total: €101.079 billion (2024)
  - Per capita: €56,311 (2024)
- Website: regierung.mittelfranken.bayern.de

Middle Franconia (German: Mittelfranken, pronounced [ˈmɪtl̩ˌfʁaŋkŋ̍]) is one of the three administrative regions of Franconia, Germany, in the west of Bavaria bordering the state of Baden-Württemberg. The administrative seat is Ansbach; the most populous and largest city is Nuremberg.

== Subdivisions ==
The region is divided into seven districts ('Landkreise') and five independent cities ('Kreisfreie Städte'). The lowest level is divided into 210 municipalities (including five cities).

=== Independent cities ===
- Ansbach
- Erlangen
- Fürth
- Nuremberg
- Schwabach

=== Districts ===
- Ansbach
- Erlangen-Höchstadt
- Fürth
- Neustadt (Aisch)-Bad Windsheim
- Nürnberger Land
- Roth
- Weißenburg-Gunzenhausen

== History ==
After the founding of the Kingdom of Bavaria the state was totally reorganised and, in 1808, divided into 15 administrative government regions (German: Regierungsbezirke (singular Regierungsbezirk)), in Bavaria called Kreise (singular: Kreis). They were created in the fashion of the French departements, quite even in size and population, and named after their main rivers.

In the following years, due to territorial changes (e. g. loss of Tyrol, addition of the Palatinate), the number of Kreise was reduced to eight. One of these was the Rezatkreis (Rezat District). In 1837 king Ludwig I of Bavaria renamed the Kreise after historical territorial names and tribes of the area. This also involved some border changes or territorial swaps. Thus the district name of Rezatkreis changed to Middle Franconia.

== Main sights ==
Next to the major city Nuremberg, the capital Ansbach and the former residence city Erlangen, the towns of the Romantic Road Rothenburg ob der Tauber and Dinkelsbühl are major tourist attractions. The Lichtenau Fortress, Rothenberg Fortress, Hohenstein and Cadolzburg are the most important castles of Middle Franconia. The Franconian Jura and the northern valley of the River Altmühl are among the scenic attractions.

== Coat of arms ==
For the German Imperial Eagle, see Reichsadler

The coat of arms displays:
- the black and white pattern of the Hohenzollern family in the upper dexter quarter (the first quarter)
- the Arms of Franconia in the lower dexter quarter (the 3rd quarter)
- the sinister half of the German Imperial Eagle (similar to that displayed by the Imperial Banner of the Holy Roman Empire).

== Population ==
Year	Inhabitants
1900	815,895
1910	930,868
1939	1,065,122
1950	1,273,030
1961	1,371,144
1970	1,486,389
1987	1,521,484
2002	1,703,869
2005	1,712,275
2006	1,712,622
2008	1,714,453
2010	1,710,876
2015	1,738,686
2019	1,775,169

== Economy ==
The Gross domestic product (GDP) of the region was 78.6 billion € in 2018, accounting for 2.4% of German economic output. GDP per capita adjusted for purchasing power was 40,900 € or 136% of the EU27 average in the same year. The GDP per employee was 105% of the EU average.

== See also ==
Other Franconian Districts:

- Upper Franconia (Oberfranken)
- Lower Franconia (Unterfranken)

Political party that is in Franconia:

- Party for Franconia (Frankenpartei)
