= Pegnitz (river) =

River in Germany

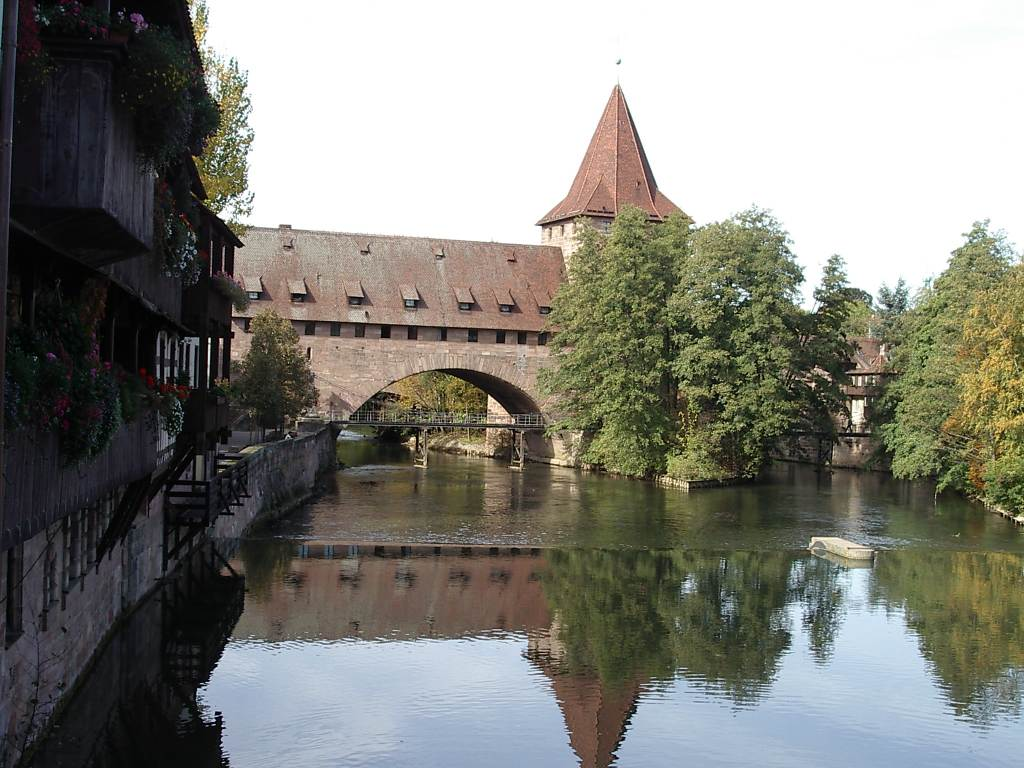
- The Pegnitz in Nuremberg

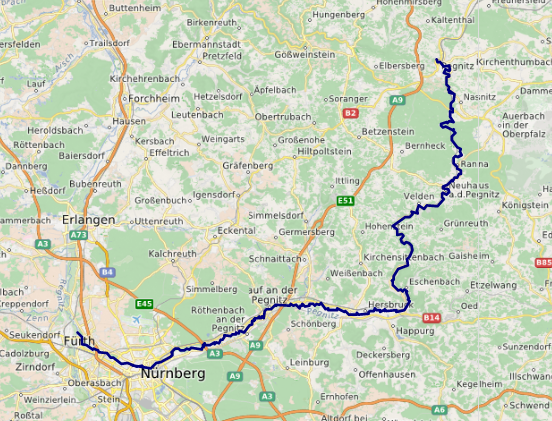

Location
- Country: Germany

Physical characteristics
- Source
  - location: Franconia
  - elevation: 425 m (1,394 ft)
- Mouth
  - location: Regnitz
  - coordinates: 49°29′11″N 10°59′12″E
  - elevation: 283 m (928 ft)
- Length: 112.6 km (70.0 mi), with Fichtenohe 127.3 km (79.1 mi)
- Basin size: 1,230 km^{2} (470 sq mi)

Basin features
- Progression: Regnitz→ Main→ Rhine→ North Sea

The Pegnitz (German: [ˈpeːɡnɪts]) is a river in Franconia in the German state of Bavaria.

The Pegnitz has its source in the town of the same name at an altitude of 425 m (1,394 ft) and meets the Rednitz at 283 m (928 ft) in Fürth to form the Regnitz river. Shortly after the source, the Pegnitz unites with the 15 km (9.3 mi) long Fichtenohe while keeping the name of the shorter tributary. Some therefore consider the Fichtenohe as the upper course of the river Pegnitz. The source of the Fichtenohe is in Lindenhardt Forest (Landkreis Bayreuth) north of the town of Pegnitz.

The Pegnitz is about 113 km (70 mi) long, with Fichtenohe 127 km (79 mi).

The river is inhabited by numerous ducks, coots, swans, and gulls.

== Tributaries ==
- Fichtenohe (left tributary)
- Flembach (left tributary)
- Hirschbach (left tributary)
- Högenbach (left tributary from the Pommelsbrunn direction)
- Happurger Bach (left tributary)
- Sittenbach (right tributary)
- Hammerbach (left tributary)
- Sandbach (left tributary)
- Schnaittach (right tributary)
- Röttenbach (right tributary)
- Bitterbach (right tributary)
- Röthenbach (left tributary)
- Langwassergraben (right tributary)
- Tiefgraben (right tributary)
- Goldbach (left tributary)

== Cities on the Pegnitz ==
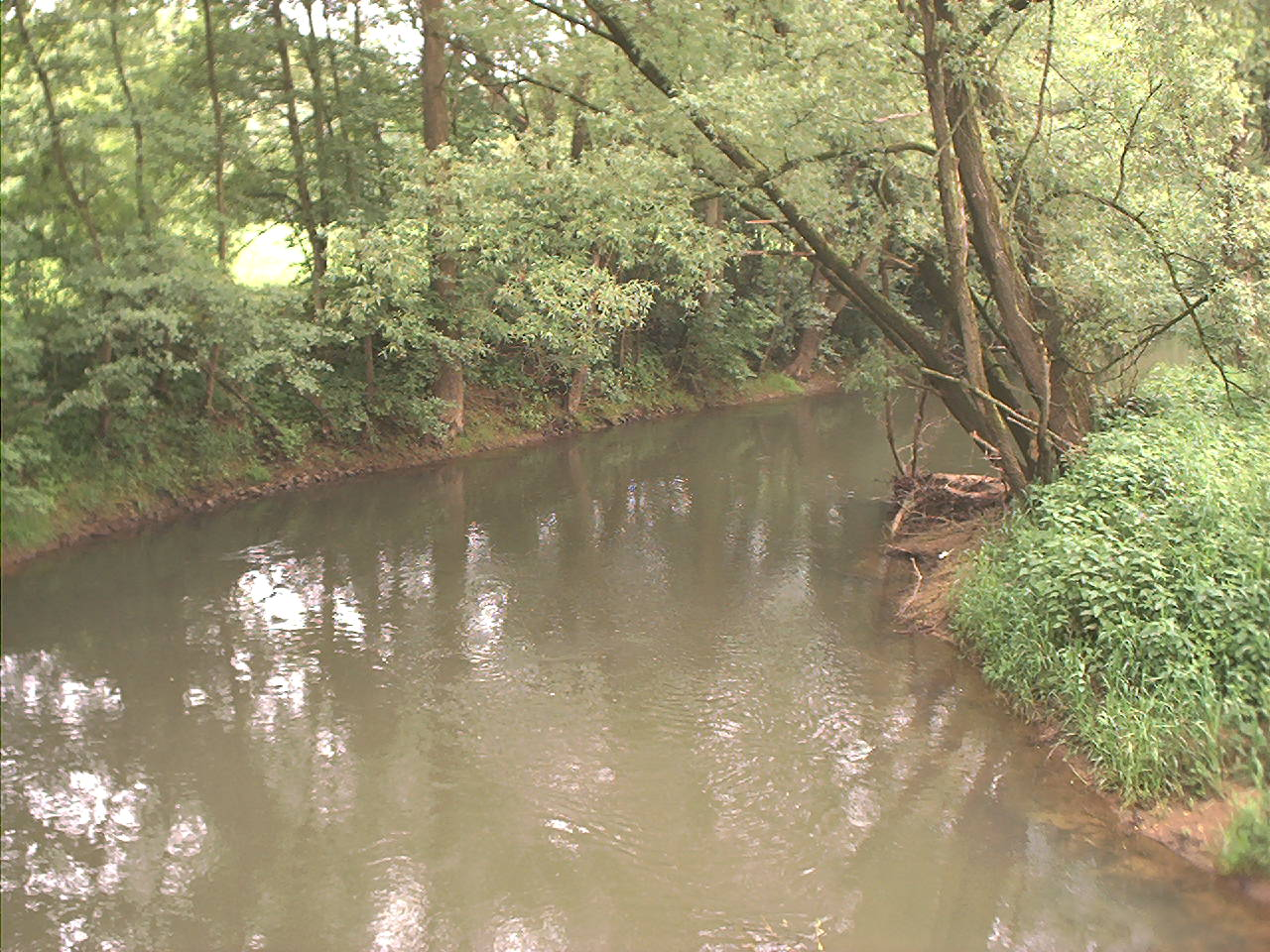
Pegnitz at Lauf an der Pegnitz

From source to mouth:

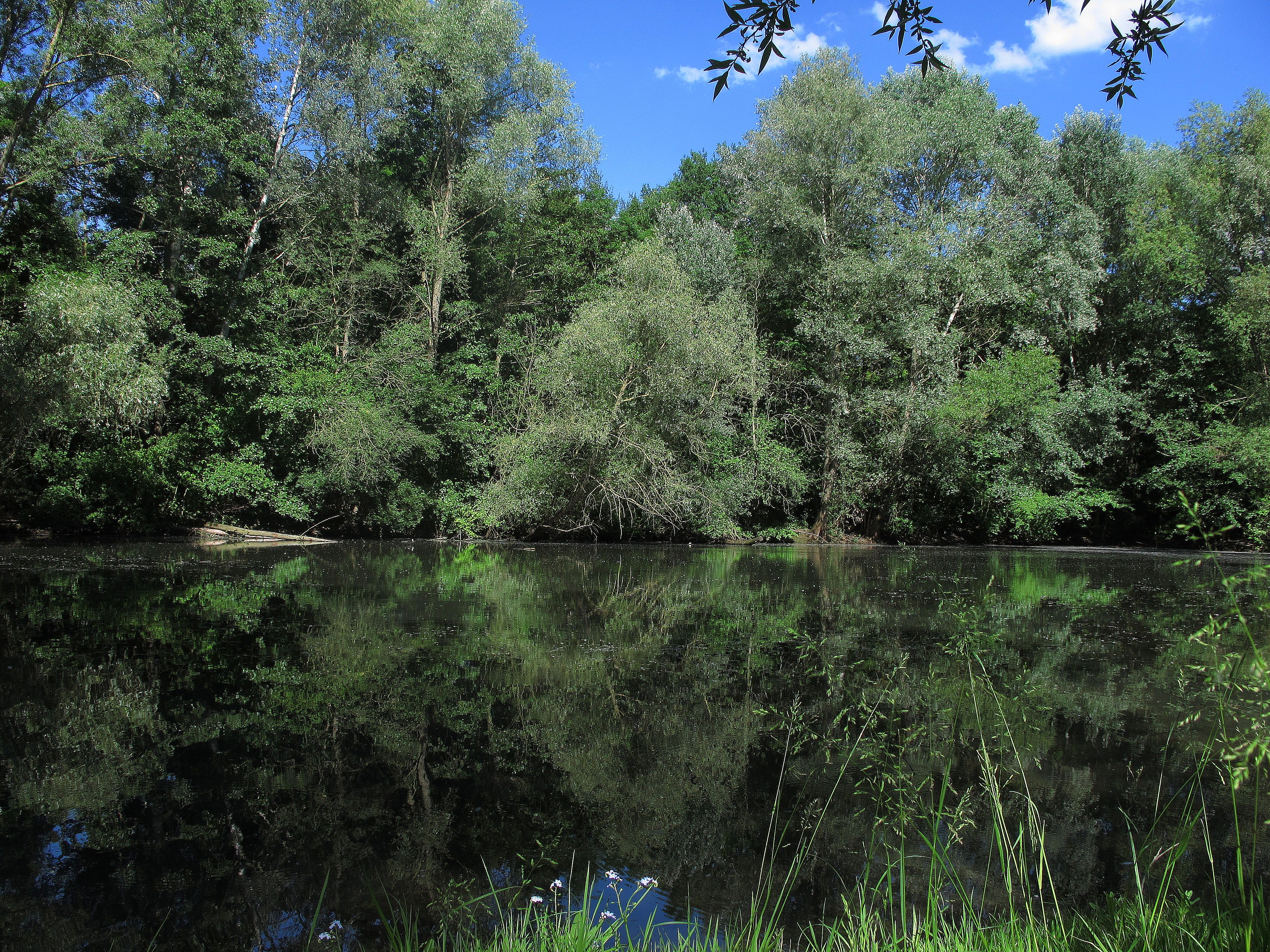
Oxbow lake of the Pegnitz in the west of Nuremberg

- Pegnitz
- Neuhaus on the Pegnitz
- Hersbruck
- Lauf an der Pegnitz
- Röthenbach an der Pegnitz
- Nuremberg: Within city limits (about 14 km), the river forms secondary arms. Numerous bridges and footbridges cross the river, such as the unchanged Renaissance bridge Fleischbrücke (1598) and the iron suspension bridge Chain Bridge (Kettensteg), dating from 1824. To the west of the Maxbrücke there is a weir. In the western part of the city, the river's ecological status was restored one section at a time from 1998 to 2001, using the historical river bed as an orientation.
- Fürth: Numerous bridges and footbridges exist. As part of project Uferstadt (riverside city), the redesign of the former Grundig site, the river bed was restored to being closer to nature in 2003. On a length of one kilometer, two new loops and shallowed banks have been created, and part of the former river bed have been kept in the form of backwaters. These activities were cofinanced by the European Union.

== History ==
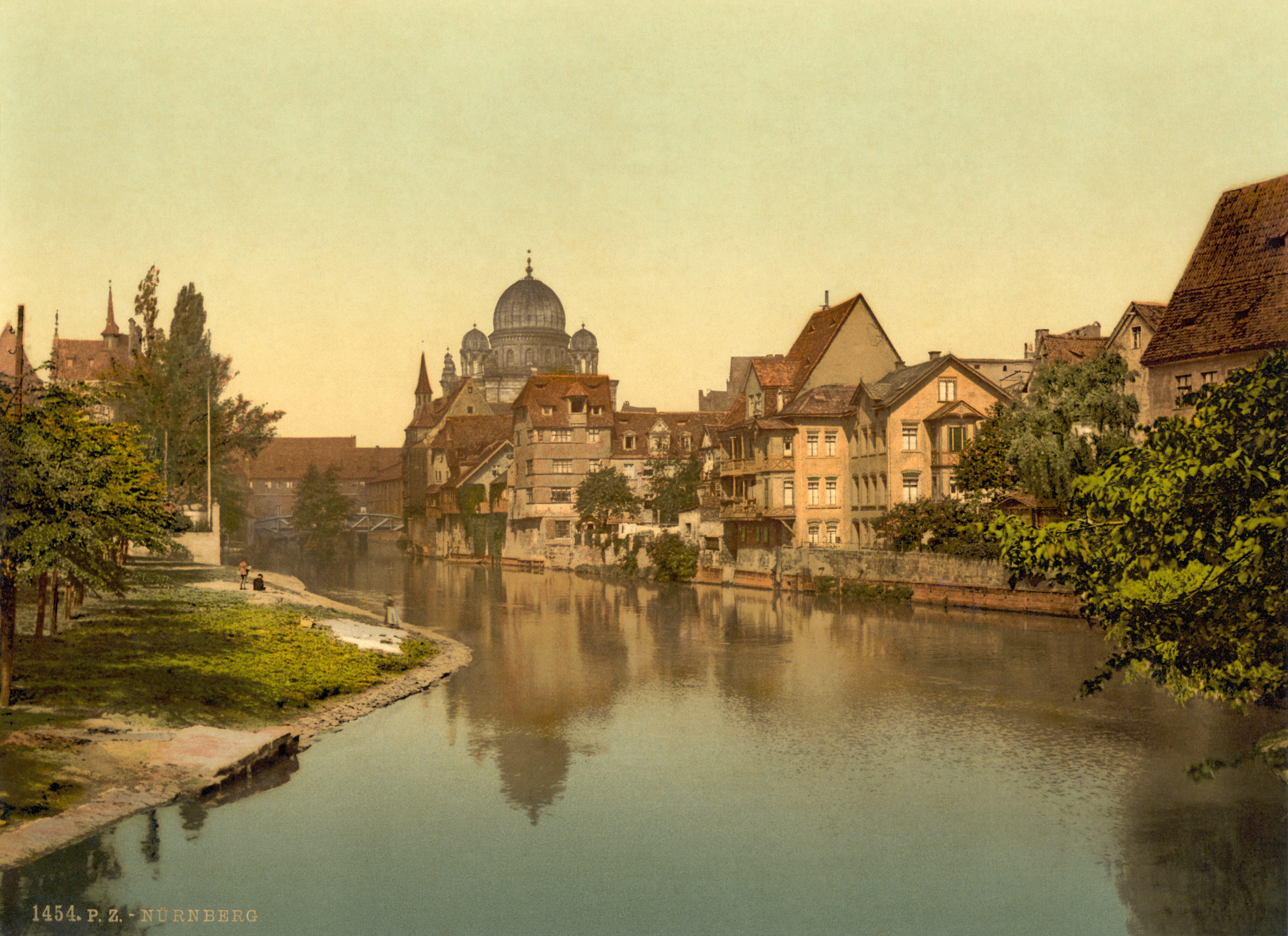
The Pegnitz River in Nuremberg, c. 1890–1900, with synagogue in the skyline

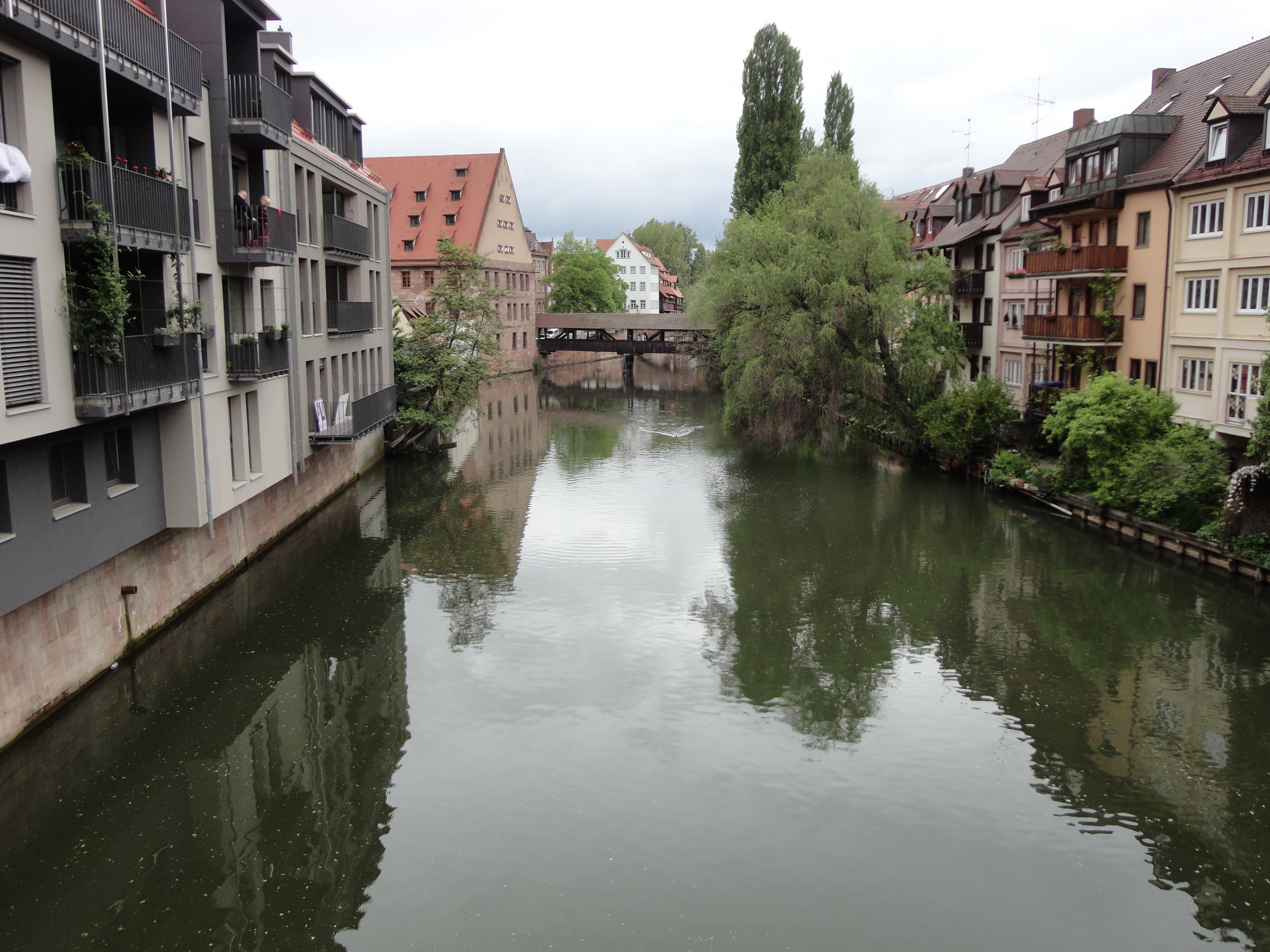
An arm of the Pegnitz in Nuremberg's old town

The river gives its name to the Pegnesischer Blumenorden (Pegnitz Flower Society) literary association.

After the big flood in February 1909, straightening has shortened the river by four kilometers within the Nuremberg city limits.

Since 1996 planning and actions are progressing trying to lengthen the course of the river between Nuremberg and Fürth again and to shape it in a nature-oriented way.

== See also ==
- List of rivers of Bavaria
