= Hermsdorfer Kreuz =

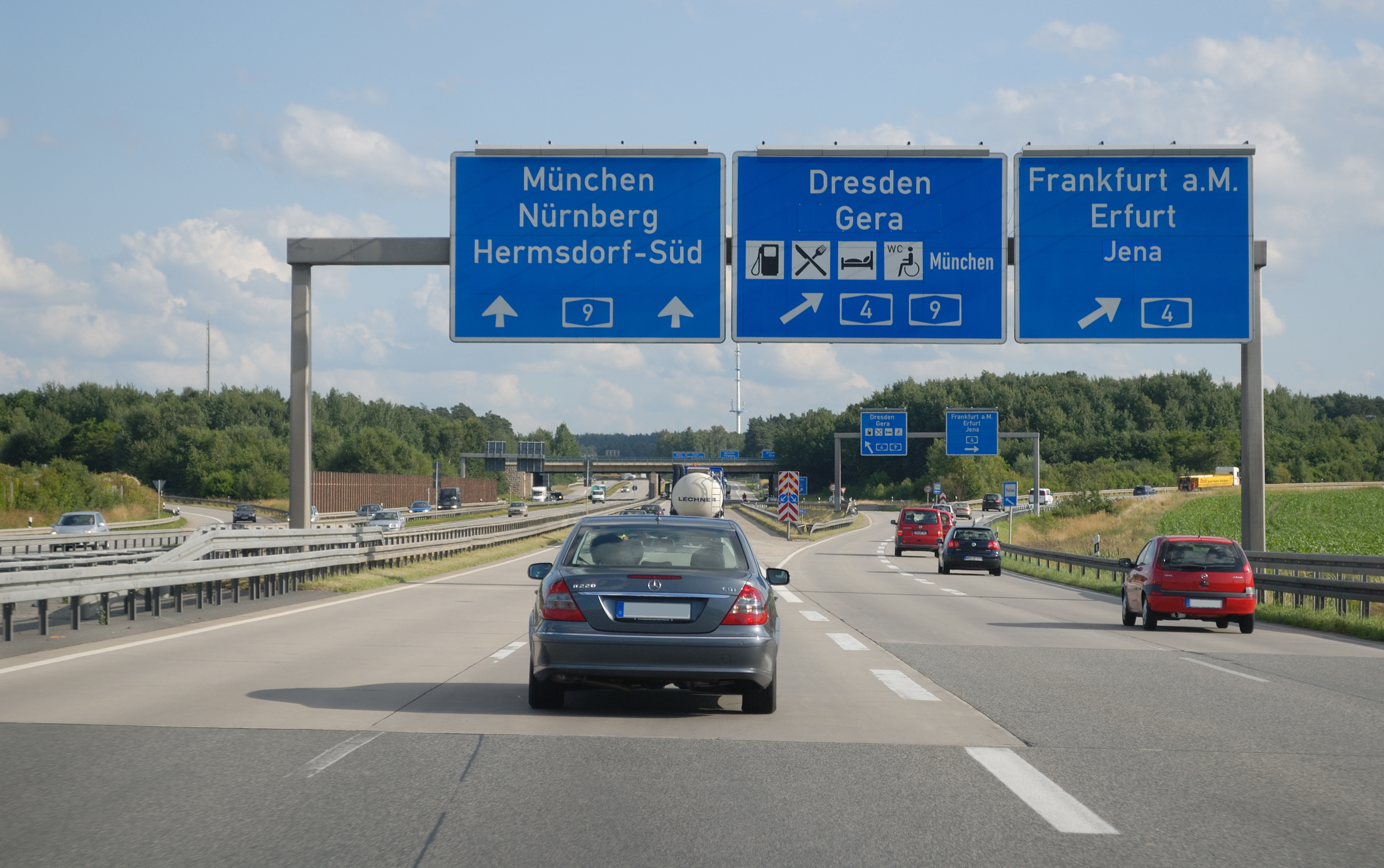
- View on the A9 coming trom the north

Location
- Hermsdorf, Germany
- Coordinates: 50°52′49.11″N 11°50′47.84″E: A 9E49/E51; A 4 E40

Construction
- Type: Cloverleaf interchange
- Lanes: 2x2/2x3
- Opened: 1936

The Hermsdorfer Kreuz is a cloverleaf interchange in the German state Thuringia.

The motorway interchange forms the connection between the A9 Dreieck Potsdam-Munich and the A4 Kirchheimer Dreieck-Polish border northeast of Görlitz.

== Geography ==
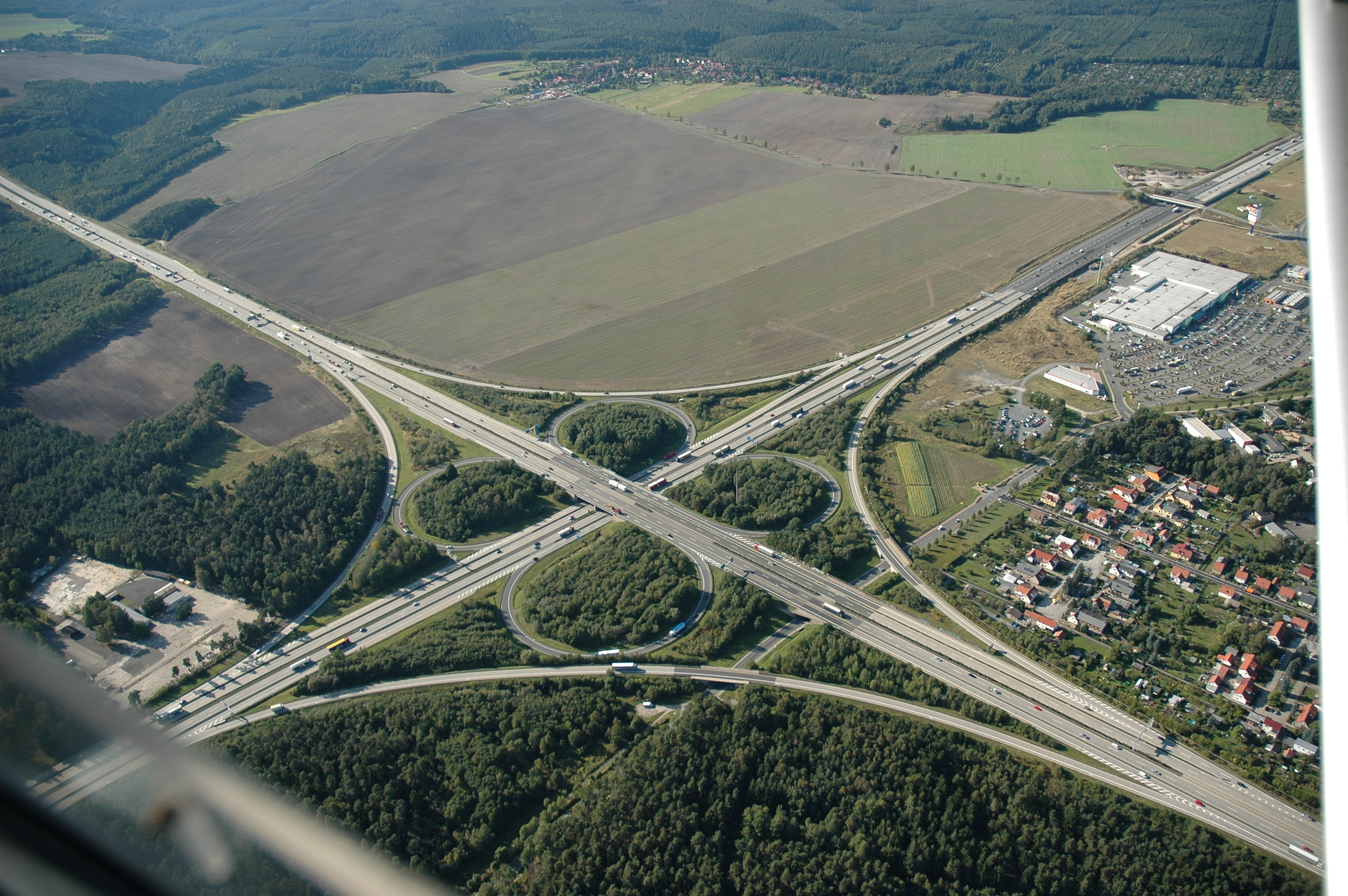
Aerial view, 2008

The motorway interchange lays in the municipal area of Schleifreisen in the Saale-Holzland-Kreis, near the towns of Hermsdorf and Reichenbach. It is a major important traffic connection between the east-west A4 connecting the Netherlands with Poland and the A9 connecting Berlin via Munich to the Austrian cities of Innsbruck and Salzburg.

== History ==
The traffic infrastructure of the Hermsdorfer Kreuz has its origins in old merchant routes that ran via Hermsdorf, Regensburg and Tyrnau (Trnava) towards Rome. The interchange proper exists since December 1936. It was built to finish the Reichsautobahn 9 as a continues link between Berlin and Munich. This makes the Hermsdorfer Kreuz the second oldest motorway interchange in Germany, after the Schkeuditzer Kreuz.

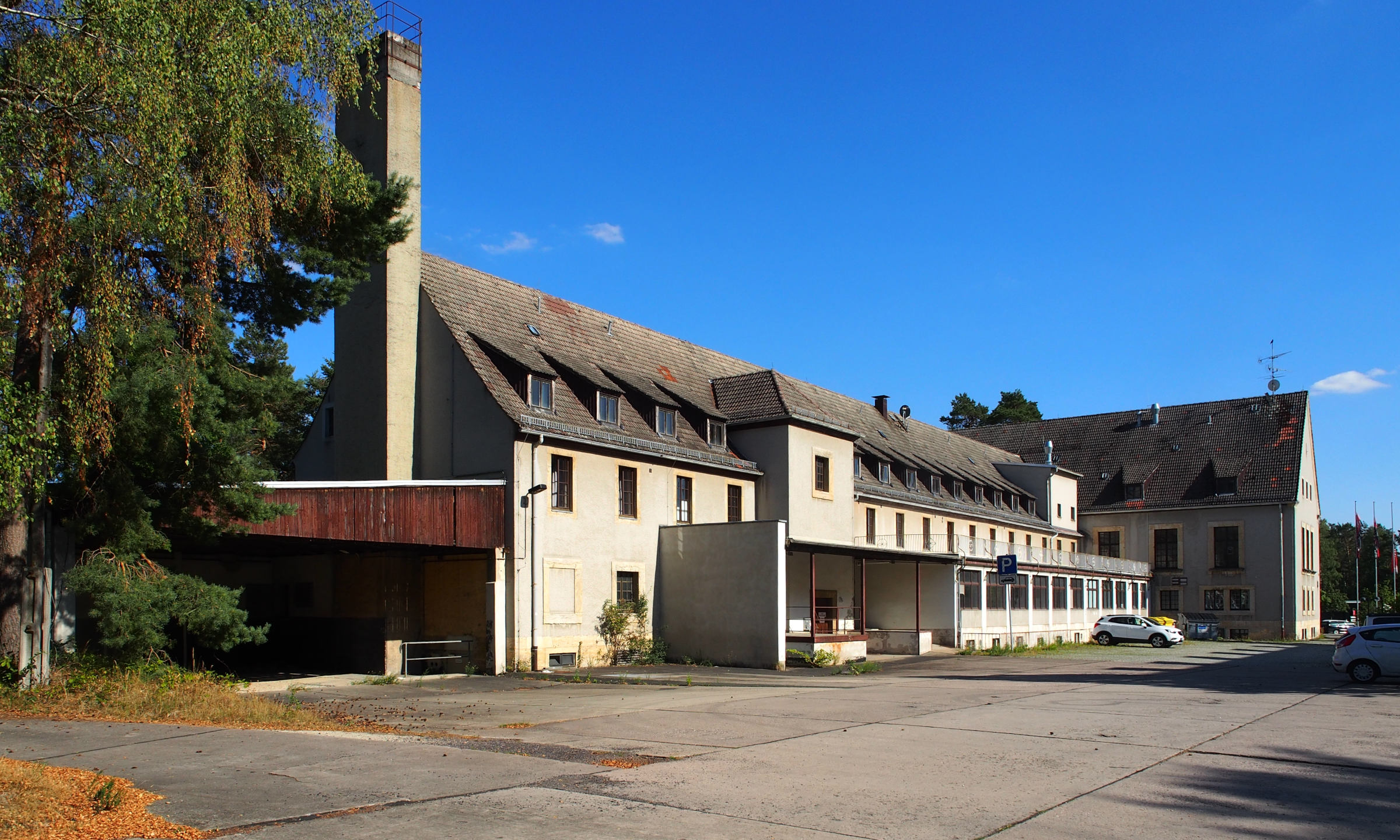
On the leg to Munich, there is the roadhouse from 1938

In 1989 approximately 15,000 vehicles passed the interchange on a daily basis. After the German reunification, traffic grew to approximately 45,000 vehicles per day.

=== Reconstruction in the 1990s ===
Between 1989 and 1992 the Hermsdorfer Kreuz was reconstructed to meet the requirements for European motorway interchanges at that time. In the process, three new motorway bridges and a 2,5 km soundbarrier were constructed and a 24 km stretch of motorway was upgraded. On 15 December 1992 the reconstructed Hermsdorfer Kreuz was opened to traffic.

== Planned reconstruction ==
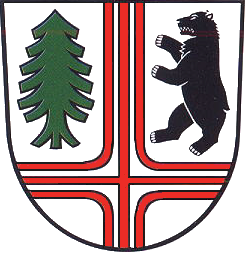
The interchange features in the coat of arms of Hermsdorf

Immediately after the reconstruction of the Hermsdorfrer Kreuz and its opening in 1992 it was stated that another reconstruction would be required starting in 2010. Further reconstructions were then intended to follow, including upgrading both motorways to a 2x3 lane layout, with the aim of providing smoother traffic flow between the A4 coming from Erfurt. Semi-direct two lane on-ramps were intended to mitigate traffic jams due to the expected rising vehicle numbers on the A4 and A9.

In December 2010, it was announced that reconstruction work would begin at the end of 2014 or the start of 2015. The stated reason for this delay were the costs for the planned pedestrian/cycle bridge over the A9. In 2012, it was announced that due to reconstruction will not start earlier than 2020, due to a pending lawsuit by the Hermsdorf municipality and ongoing protests. A total work duration of three years has been estimated.

== Traffic on the interchange ==
In 2012, approximately 110,000 vehicles passed the interchange on a daily basis.

From	To	Average daily traffic	Percentage of heavy traffic
AS Stadtroda (A 4)	Hermsdorfer Kreuz	60.600	16,7 %
Hermsdorfer Kreuz	AS Hermsdorf-Ost (A 4)	40.400	17,0 %
AS Bad Klosterlausnitz (A 9)	Hermsdorfer Kreuz	68.600	19,7 %
Hermsdorfer Kreuz	AS Hermsdorf-Süd (A 9)	49.500	21,3 %
