= Thuringian Holzland =

Coordinates: 50°55′37″N 11°49′55″E

The Thuringian Holzland (German: Thüringer Holzland, pronounced [ˈtyːʁɪŋɐ ˈhɔltsˌlant] ) is an upland region in the state of Thuringia, Germany.

== Location ==
The Thuringian Holzland lies within a triangle formed by the towns of Hermsdorf, Eisenberg and Stadtroda and between the rivers Saale, White Elster and Orlasenke. Originally it comprised the following 8 villages: Bad Klosterlausnitz, Hermsdorf, Oberndorf, Reichenbach, Schleifreisen, Sankt Gangloff, Tautenhain and Weißenborn.

== Description and history ==
The reason for the extensive forests of this landscape is its rather infertile soils, which have been formed from the sandstones of the Bunter formation that make up the area. As a result, the Holzland is of limited use for agriculture.

The rich timber industry of the area meant that once typical occupations, such as ladder maker (Leitermacher), blacksmith (Peckschmied), tubmaker (Muldenhauer), etc., were very common here. Which is why the area is also often referred to not infrequently as Leiterland ("ladder land"). In the late 19th century, the china industry (the industry was based in Hermsdorf - household porcelain was especially centred on Reichenbach. After 1989 there were a large number of spin-offs from the Hermsdorf ceramic works (KWH) (from 1990 Tridelta AG) and several start-ups of companies in the pottery, micro-electronics, micromachinery, powder metallurgy and service industries, etc.

For many years the Thuringian Holzland has also been used as the recreational area of the East Thuringian region and beyond. In warm weather, tourists walk in small and large groups by the Zeitzgrund or the Eisenberg Mill Valley. The mills were mostly converted into restaurants and footpaths have largely been improved.

The railway line between Weimar, Jena and Gera (via Stadtroda, Hermsdorf and Klosterlausnitz ) is called the Holzland Railway.
