= Bundesautobahn 9 =

Autobahn connecting Berlin and Münich

A 9
- Bundesautobahn 9
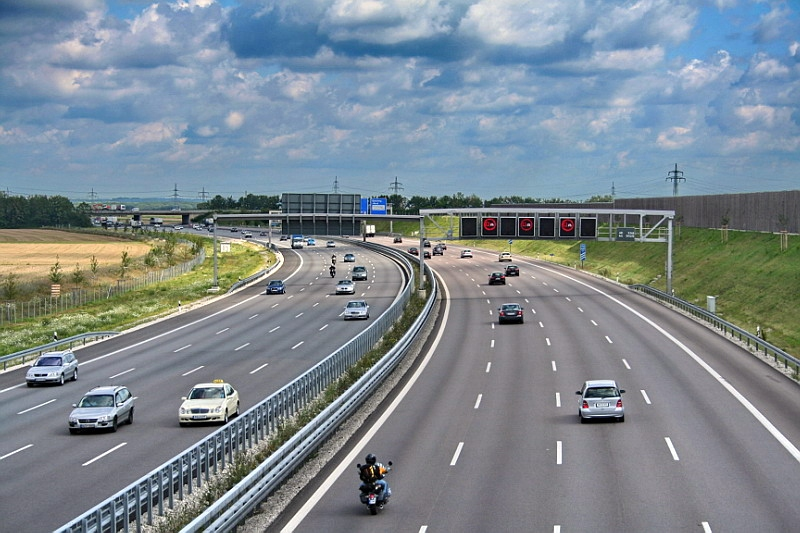

Route information
- Length: 529 km (329 mi)

Major junctions
- North end: Bundesautobahn 10 in Schwielowsee, Brandenburg
- South end: Bundesstraße 2R in Munich

Location
- Country: Germany
- States: Brandenburg, Saxony-Anhalt, Saxony, Thuringia, Bavaria

Highway system
- Roads in Germany; Autobahns; List; Federal; List; State; E-roads
← A 8	→ A 10

Bundesautobahn 9 (translates from German as Federal Motorway 9, short form Autobahn 9, abbreviated as BAB 9 or A 9) is an autobahn in Germany, connecting Berlin and Munich via Leipzig and Nuremberg. It is the fifth longest autobahn spanning 529 km (328.71 mi).

== Route ==
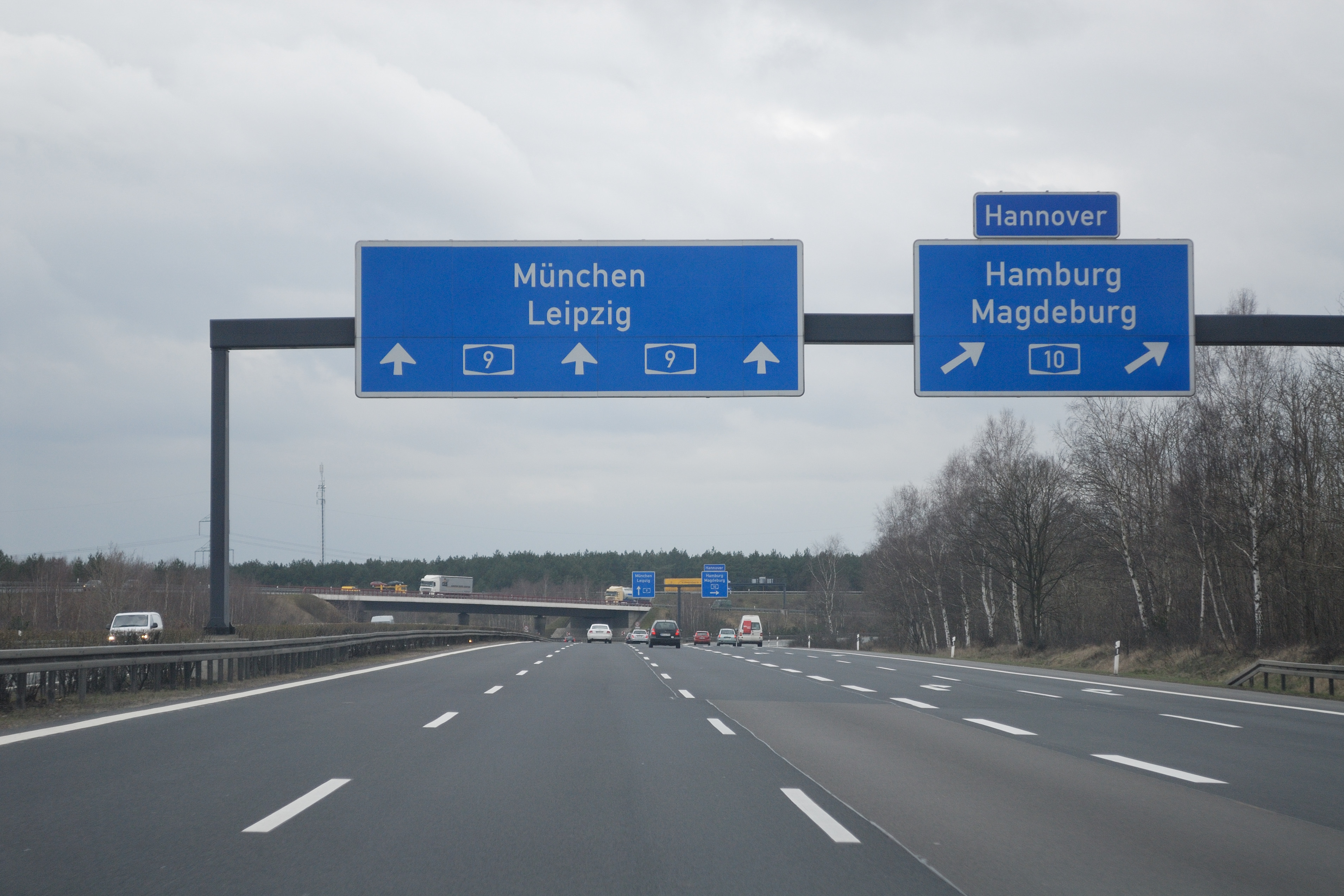
Potsdam interchange

The northern terminus of the A 9 is at the Potsdam interchange, where it merges into the A 10, also known as the "Berliner Ring", about 30 kilometres (19 mi) away from the Berlin city limits. The shortest route from there into Berlin would be the A 10 (east) and the A 115 (AVUS). The southern end is in the Munich borough of Schwabing.

On its way, the A 9 passes through the German states of Brandenburg, Saxony-Anhalt, Thuringia, and Bavaria. West of Leipzig, the border between Saxony-Anhalt and Saxony crisscrosses along the autobahn. In Bavaria, long sections of the Nuremberg–Munich high-speed railway run parallel to the autobahn.

== History ==
Plans for a European motorway connection from Berlin to Rome were already developed from 1927 by a private MüLeiBerl (Munich-Leipzig-Berlin) company. However, construction of the A 9 was not begun until the 1930s as part of the Reichsautobahn project set up by Nazi Germany.

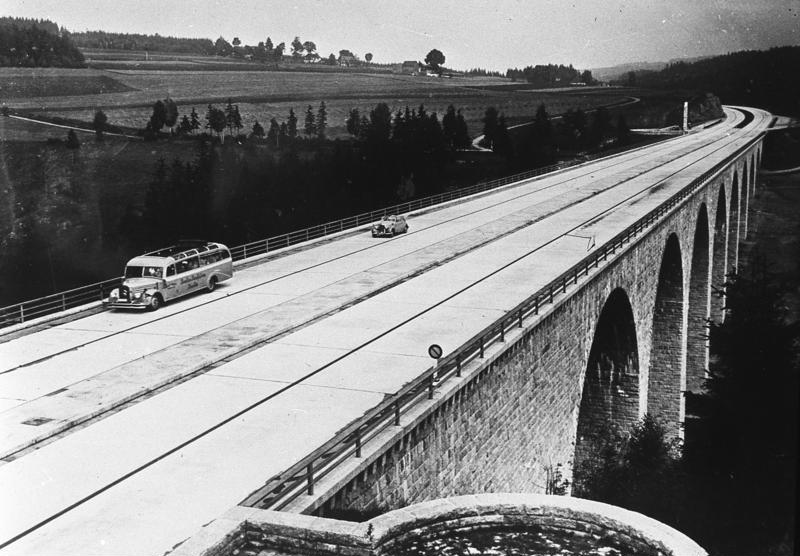
Rudolphstein Saale Bridge in the 1930s, graced by a Mercedes-Benz touring coach. The bridge was later destroyed at the end of the war but rebuilt due to West and East German cooperation in 1966. The river marked the inner German border.

It was inaugurated in sections, beginning in 1936 with the Strecke 16 between what is today's Schkeuditz interchange (present-day A 9 and A 14) near Leipzig and Bad Berneck im Fichtelgebirge, 164 kilometres (102 mi) in length. With the opening of the second lane near Schnaittach in 1941, the last gap was closed. This makes the A 9 Germany's first completed autobahn.

After World War II, the section from the inner German border to Berlin served as one of four transit access roads through East Germany (GDR) toward West Berlin during the Cold War era. The road was closed by the Soviet Military Administration during the Berlin Blockade. The U.S. Army Europe under Lucius D. Clay considered a tank offensive to forcibly reopen the route, but chose not to implement the plan since it had no guaranteed chance of success and would lead to World War III if the Group of Soviet Forces in Germany chose to resist. The route was finally reopened after the success of the Berlin Airlift.

Yellow signs with "TRANSIT" in black letters marked the allowed route. Distances were usually given towards Berlin - Hauptstadt der DDR ("Berlin - Capital of the GDR"), i.e. East Berlin. Despite funding from West Germany, road conditions were generally poor. The surface was made up of 1930s concrete slabs rather than blacktop or continuously cast concrete. A section in Thuringia between Schleiz and the Rodaborn rest area even was a cobblestone road, later paved over by the East German authorities until being replaced by concrete in the 1980s. Until the introduction of a new numbering system in 1974, the southern part was known as the West German A 3.

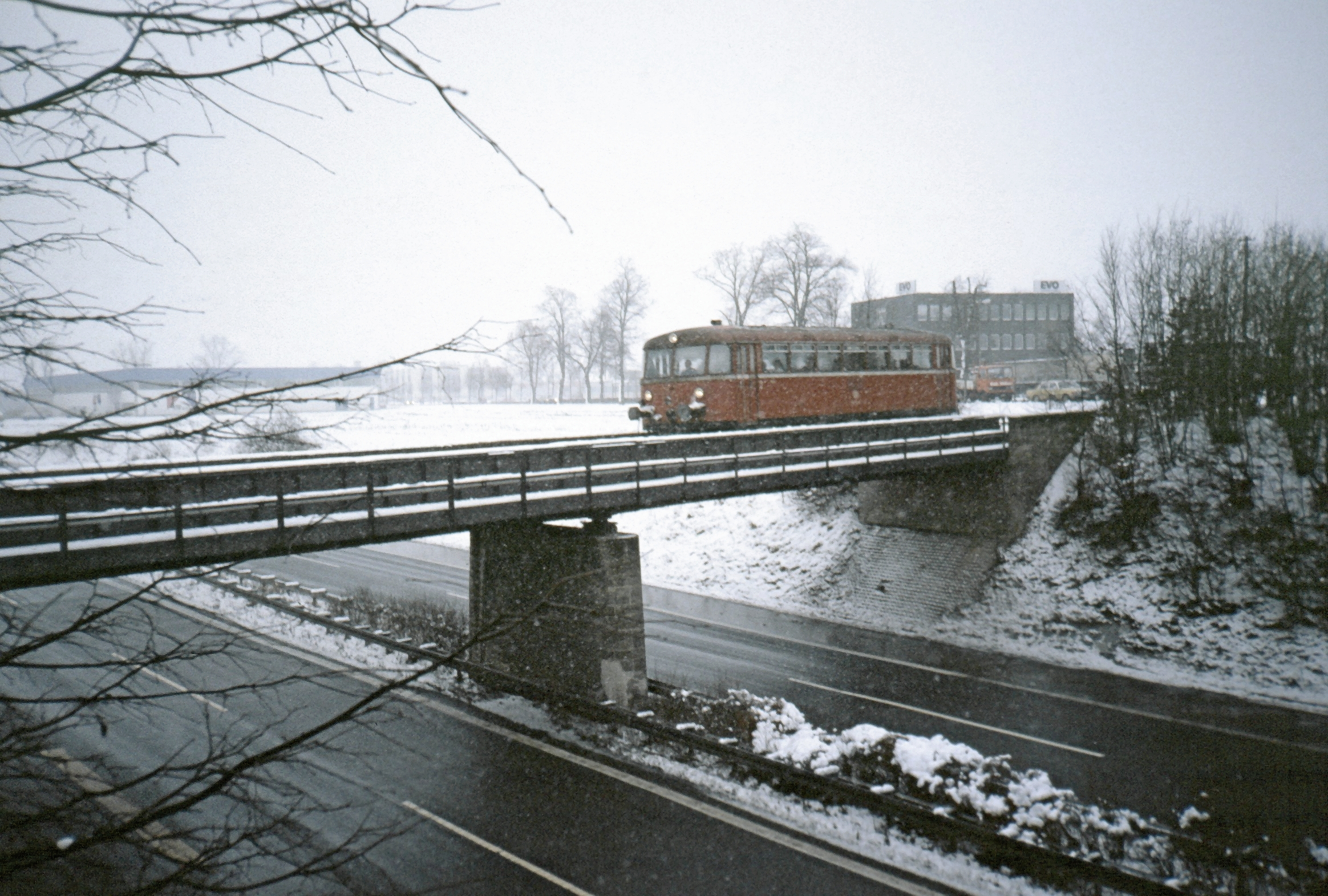
Railbus crossing the A 9 near Bayreuth, 1986

After reunification, the continuous six-lane expansion of the A 9 from the Potsdam junction to the Nuremberg interchange was tackled as an important transport project German unit No. 12. With a traffic load of up to 50,000 vehicles per day near Bayreuth in 1990, the four-lane route was close to the capacity limit.

As part of the six-lane expansion, the new route was relocated in some sections, as the old road has gradients of sometimes over seven percent and tight curve radii. For example, in the area of Münchberg south of Hof a viaduct was built to avoid the guidance of the highway through a fog valley, especially because in this section on 19 October 1990 a heavy pile-up with ten dead and numerous seriously injured had occurred. West of Bad Berneck in the Fichtelgebirge led the old carriageway on a bridge in the middle of the village Lanzendorf. This very stressful condition for the residents was eliminated with the new track construction; Today, the highway runs east of the village. Even before the expansion, the motorway church Himmelkron was built directly on the old carriageway and consecrated on 6 October 1996. The church building is therefore today a bit off the new route. The course was also changed at the connection point Trockau (43). The new route runs slightly east of the old one. The formerly very steep and extremely winding Trockauer Berg was defused by the laying of the route. At Hienberg between the junctions Hormersdorf (47) and Schnaittach (48), there are always different routes for the two lanes. The separation of the lanes was maintained in the six lane expansion, but the course changed. The rest stop Hienberg, which lay on the mountain of the same name, does not exist anymore.

In 2001, the six-lane expansion, with the exception of three sections, was completed. The 120 million DM expensive conversion between the junctions Bayreuth-North and -Süd, which included a 320 -meter-long enclosure and noise barriers, dragged itself into the year 2006. After its completion, there were only in Thuringia track sections of the A 9 with four lanes without hard shoulder. These were on the one hand to the Hermsdorfer cross and on the other to 19 kilometers south of the junction Triptis at operating kilometer 205 and north of the junction Schleiz at operating kilometer 224. Another reason for the delay was that in terms of financing new Tried ways and private investors were searched by tender, which should refinance on the truck toll (so-called A-model). It promises a higher quality of the road and a faster completion. According to the announcement of 4 August 2011, the consortium A9SixLanes from the companies VINCI Concessions (47.5%), BAM PPP (47.5%) and Reinhold Meister GmbH (5%) was awarded the contract for the expansion. The construction work was carried out by a construction consortium led by Eurovia, Wayss & Freytag (daughter of Royal BAM) and Reinhold Meister and started in 2012. The section was released on 5 September 2014. In November 2014, the remaining work was completed. The expansion of the A 9 took about 25 years.

Despite the six-lane expansion still some structures of the original route have been preserved, such. B. the bridge in the Holledau at the rest area Holledau, the Saale bridge in the direction of Munich between Bad Lobenstein (29) and Rudolphstein (30) and the Tautendorfer bridge in direction Berlin between Hermsdorf-South (25a) and Lederhose (25b). Between the cross Rippachtal (19) and the exit Naumburg (21a) still lead three original bridges over the highway.

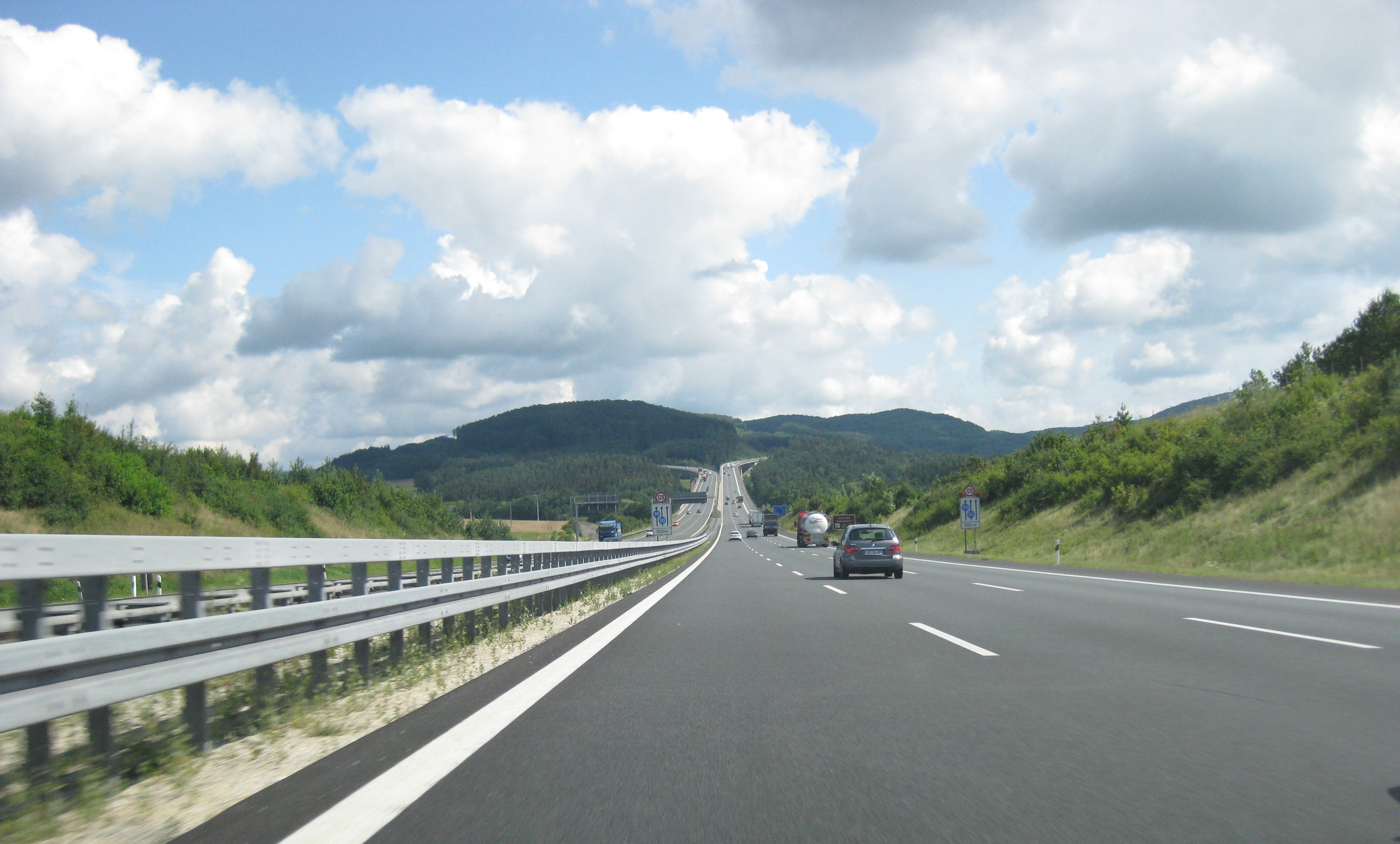
The expressway along Hienberg

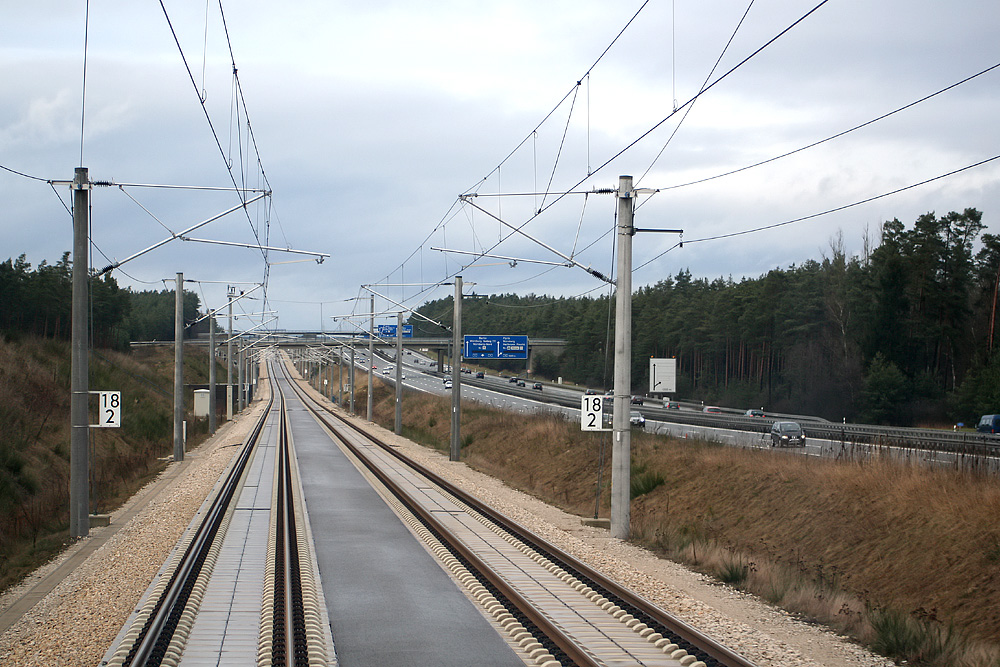
ICE tracks along the expressway

Furthermore, some service areas were closed and replaced during the expansion. Thus, on 30 June 2004, the rest area Rodaborn near Triptis was closed. It had been opened in 1928 as a tourist restaurant for the citizens of Triptis and was in 1936 with the completion of the Reichsautobahn to the first motorway service area in Germany. In GDR times, it was closed in the 1970s and reopened in 1986 only for transit travelers by the hospitality company Mitropa. At the same place an uncultivated parking lot was built after the closure. Also two resting places in Bavaria had to give way to the six-lane extension; on the one hand Sophienberg south of Bayreuth and Hienberg north of Nuremberg on the same mountain. In place of the former, an uncultivated parking facility was built, as a replacement for both facilities was built in 1999 at Pegnitz the service area Franconian Switzerland / Pegnitz.

== Current condition and future plans ==
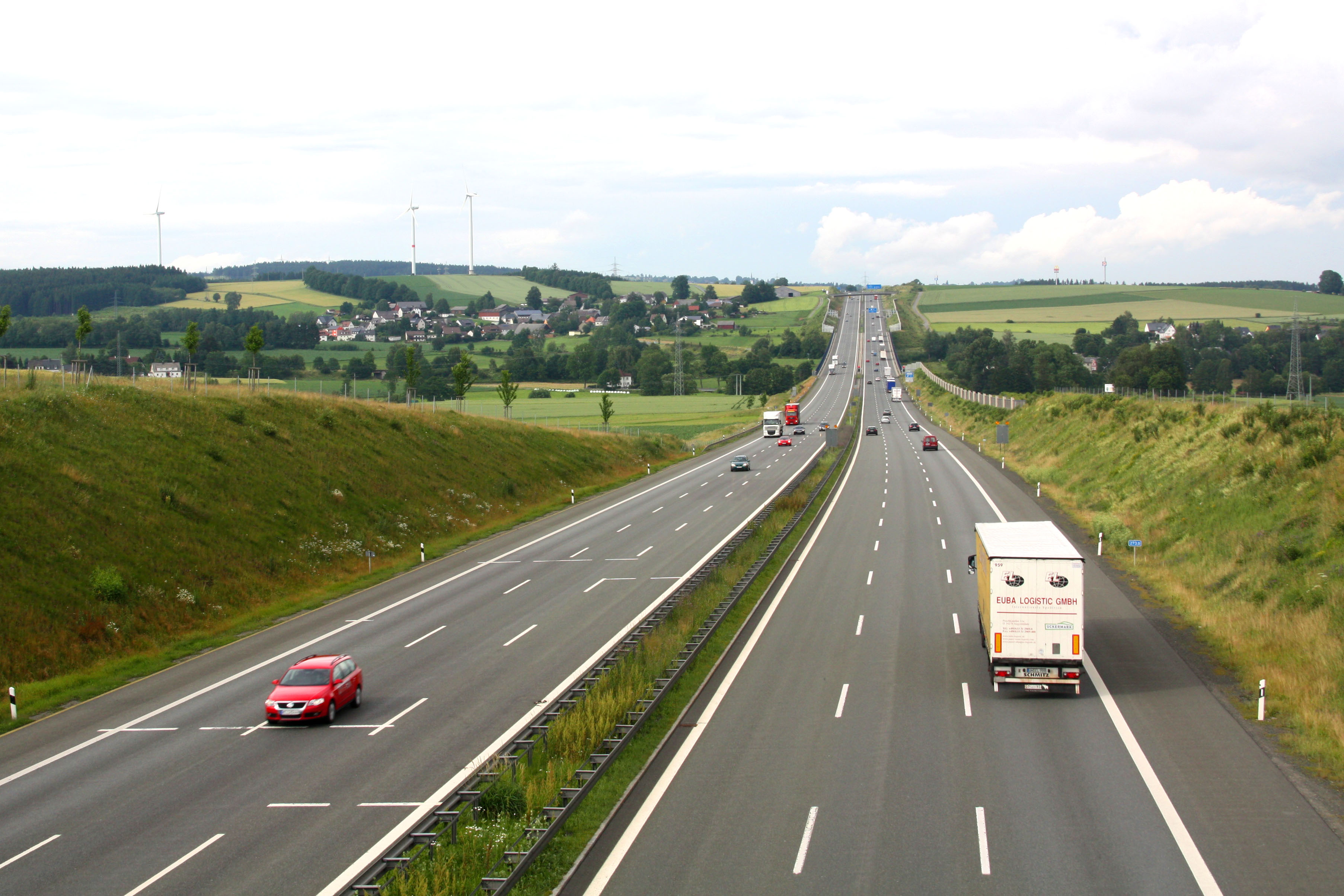
A 9 near Münchberg, Bavaria

With one exception, Hermsdorf interchange, the A 9 has a profile of at least three lanes and one emergency lane per direction. The section between Neufahrn and the München-Nord interchange north of Munich was upgraded between 2004 and 2006 to four lanes each way. A survey of this section conducted in 2008 recorded an average number of 143,000 vehicles per day and a maximum of 184,000.

Since 2006 talks have been underway about turning the three-way interchange Holledau into a four-way, and extending the A 93 into the Pfaffenhofen area. Further plans and visions include widening the Hermsdorfer Kreuz to six lanes, and widening the sections Nuremberg – Nuremberg-East and Holledau – Neufahrn to eight lanes.

On 26 January 2015 German transport minister Alexander Dobrindt announced plans to outfit an as yet undesignated section of the A9 in Bavaria as a test track for autonomous cars.

== Along the route ==
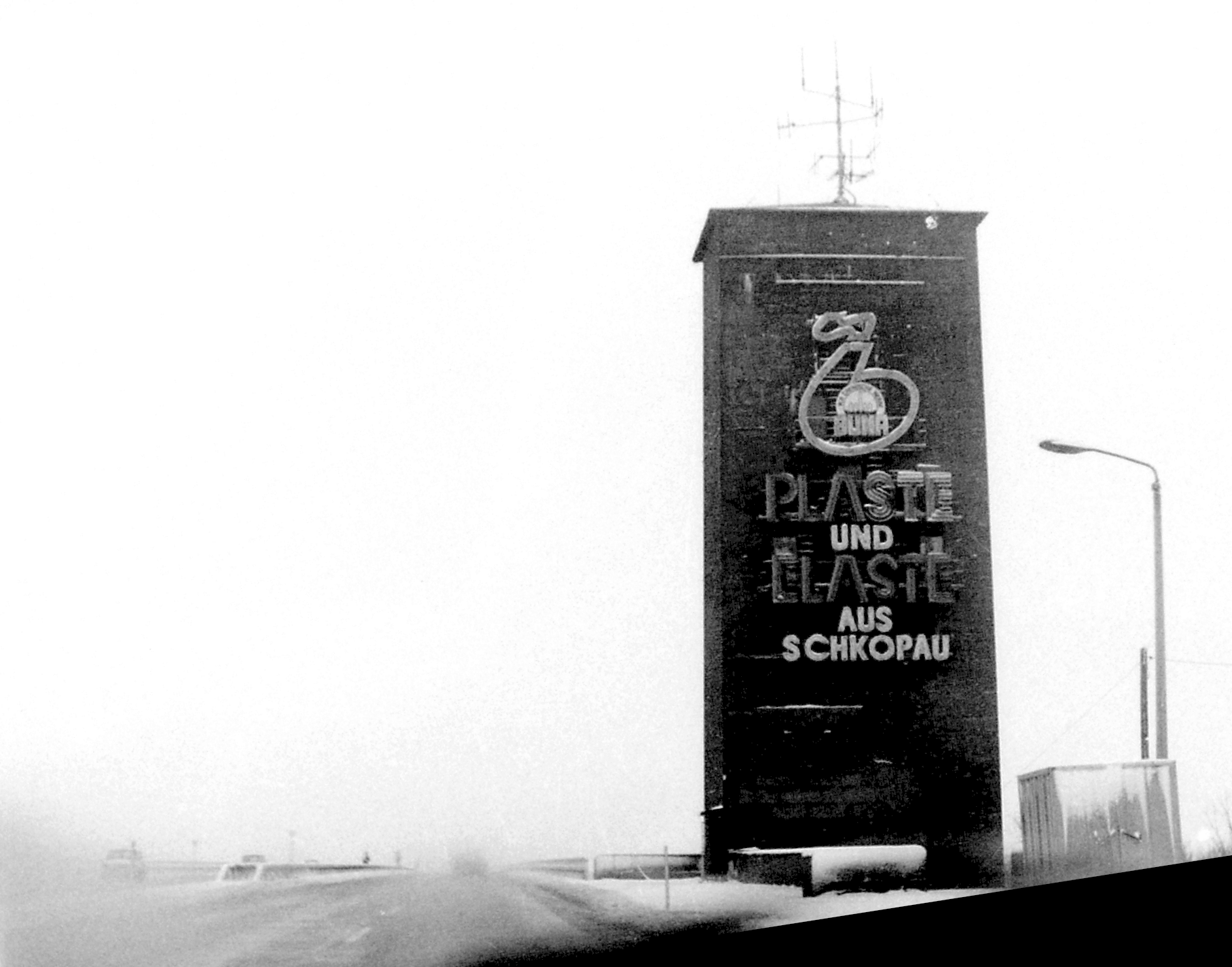
Vockerode Elbe Bridge tower, c. 1984

East of Dessau, the autobahn crosses the Elbe River via the 654 m (2,146 ft) long Vockerode Bridge. Built in 1938 according to plans designed by Paul Bonatz, it was replaced by a new construction in the course of the A 9 extension from 1996 to 2000. The prominent tower at the northern end is preserved, it was widely known to transit travellers for its Plaste und Elaste aus Schkopau ("plastic and elastomer from Schkopau") neon sign, now on display at the German Historical Museum in Berlin.

Close to exit 10, Dessau-East, a gravel pit had provided material for the construction of the autobahn. After 1939 the pit was renaturated and became the "Reichsautobahnbad Mildensee", with cabins to change, and eateries. It is still in use today as a beach, but not under the old name.

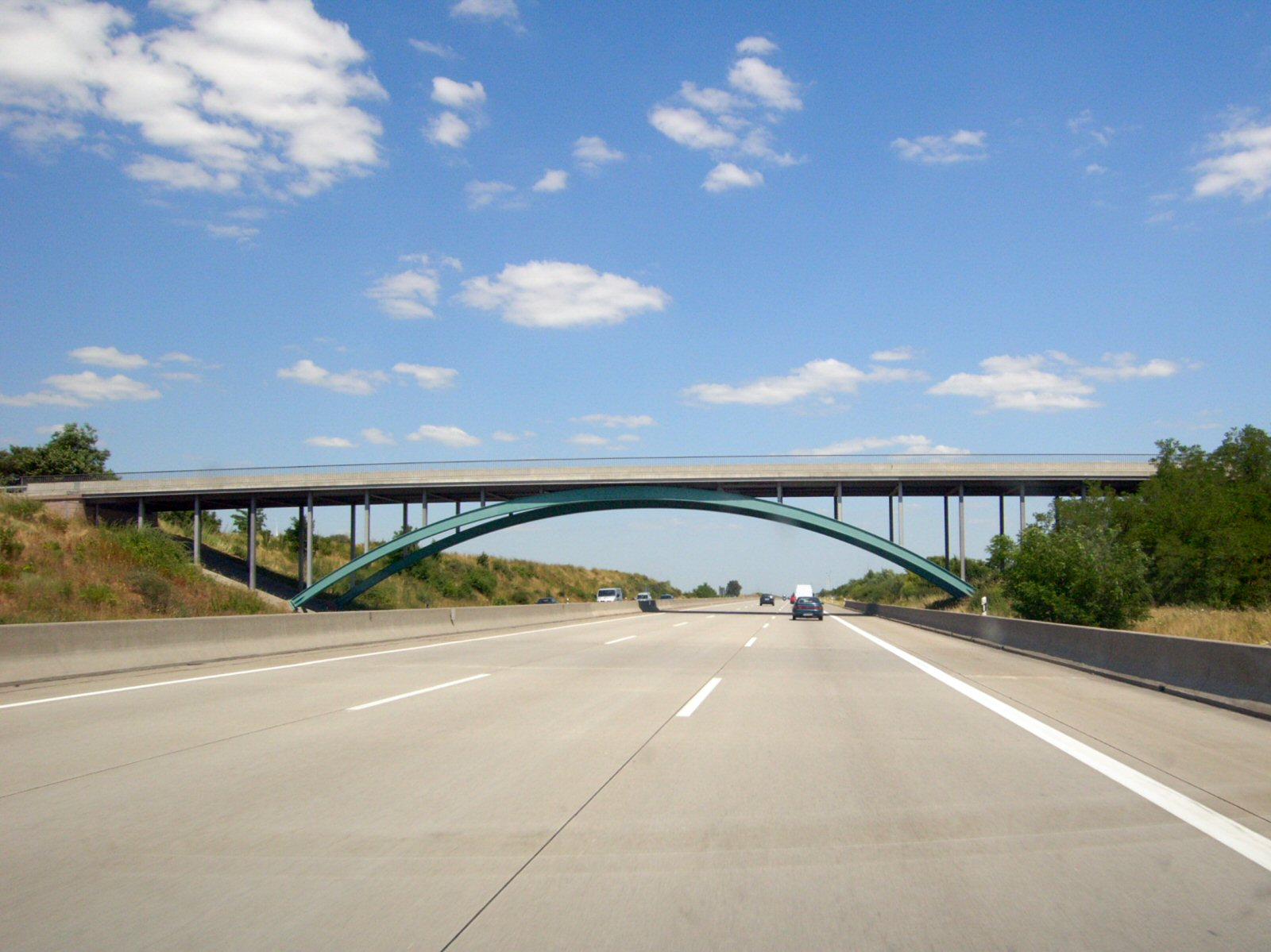
Dessau Racetrack with modern jersey barrier median

=== The Dessauer Rennstrecke ===
South of exit 11, Dessau-South, nearly ten kilometers of the roadbed — roughly from Thurland southwards to just north of the B 183 (ex-B 186) interchange (exit 12 for Bitterfeld/Wolfen of the modern A9 roadbed) — were upgraded with a paved-over median to become the "Dessauer Rennstrecke" (Dessau Racetrack), a 25-meter (82 ft) wide high-speed track intended for races and record attempts, such as by Rudolf Caracciola in 1938/39, Goldie Gardner in 1939 or those by Hans Stuck with the Mercedes-Benz T80 land speed record car, intended to start in January 1940 - the Rennstrecke segment itself had even been marked out on road maps as early as 1938. With its pillarless bridges and no interchange exits before 1945, but especially with the straight alignment and the broad concrete surface without a distinct median, it was also intended to function as an auxiliary airfield in World War II. After the war, annual races were resumed from 1949 to 1956. The East German driver Paul Greifzu was killed in a training accident on 10 May 1952.

The four-way interchange at Schkeuditz was the first cloverleaf interchange in Germany, as well as the first autobahn interchange in Europe. It was opened in 1936, two years before construction was finished.

On 30 June 2004 Germany's oldest autobahn inn, Rodaborn near Triptis, was closed due to the upgrading of the old two-lane to the modern three-lane profile. Located near the source of the Roda River, the restaurant was opened in 1928 as a country inn for the local population and turned into a rest area on 20 December 1936 when the Reichsautobahn was opened. During the days of the GDR, it was run by the state-owned Handelsorganisation (HO) company, later by Mitropa. The rest area was open only for transit travellers, not for East German citizens. In 2009, in a loop of history, it was rented by a local couple to re-open it as an inn for local daytrippers. Though the connection to the adjacent autobahn parking lot is cut off by a fence, Rodaborn still is a popular stop for motorway travellers.

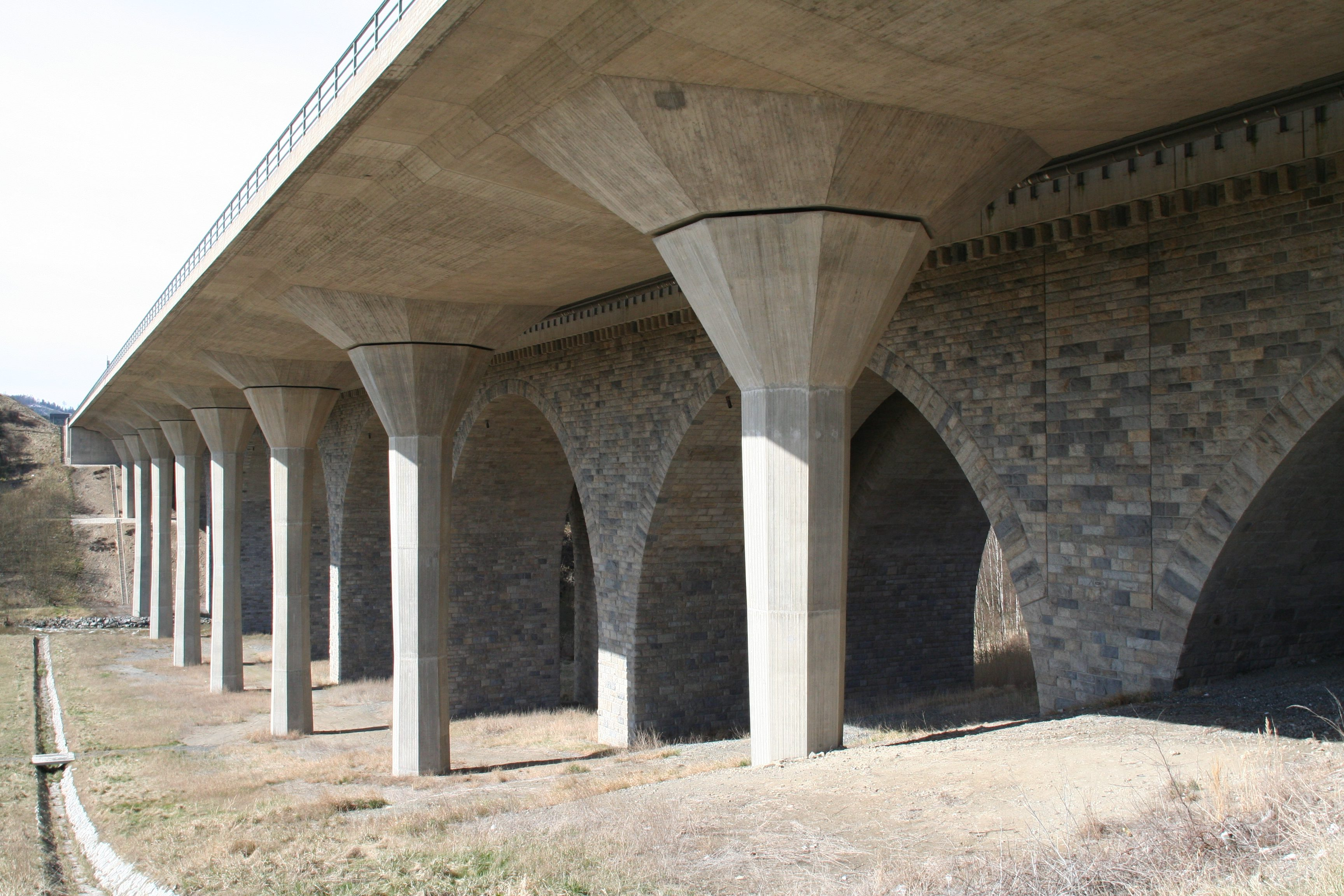
Old and new Saale Bridge

The Rudolphstein Saale Bridge south of Bad Lobenstein, an arch bridge designed by Paul Bonatz, was opened on 27 September 1936 and soon became an icon of the Reichsautobahn development program. Between 1945 and 1966 the A 9 was interrupted at the inner German border between Bavaria and Thuringia since an arch of the bridge had been blown up by retiring Wehrmacht forces near the end of the war. Traffic to and from West Berlin was diverted via A 72 until 1951 and from then until 1966 via B 2. Not until then the bridge could be rebuilt in a complicated joint venture of West and East German authorities. In the course of the autobahn extension, a second bridge was erected parallel to the original construction.

The Frankenwald rest area near exit Rudolphstein is one of two rest areas in Germany with a restaurant bridging the road.

In Lanzendorf near Bad Berneck, the autobahn passed right through the village on a bridge. The route was realigned during the construction after 1990. Right next to the old route, the autobahn church Lanzendorf was built. Sanctification took place 6 October 1996.

Exit 40b, Bindlacher Berg, was until after reunification no public exit, but used exclusively by the US Forces stationed on the Bindlacher Berg.

Until the upgrade to six lanes, from Bayreuth-Nord to Bindlach existed the last autobahn alley of trees in Germany. It has been replanted since.

Near Trockau, the former steep and curvy section also was realigned after 1990.

Exit 45, Weidensees, was called "Veldensteiner Forst" until the 1970s and was probably built on behalf of Hermann Göring, who had a hunt nearby. Weidensees itself did not merit its own exit.

Interchange 51, Nuremberg, was originally a cloverleaf. It had been improved by adding a long, sweeping bridge from the northern lane of the A9 coming from Munich towards the A3 in the direction of Würzburg and Frankfurt, since the traffic in that direction was much heavier than the traffic heading north. The old, small curve in the former south-east quadrant still shows what is probably the original 1930's cobblestone.

Despite the upgrade to six lanes total, some original bridges have been retained, but carry just one direction, like the bridge crossing the Saale at the old border crossing between Bavaria and Thuringia.

From 2000 until construction began to upgrade to four lanes for each direction, the section between Neufahrn and Munich-Nord was among the first in Germany where it was allowed in appropriately heavy (and correspondingly slow) traffic to legally use the emergency lane as an additional traffic lane. Since further adding of two more lanes north of Neufahrn towards Holledau is not in sight, a similar regulation is considered for this section.

Near exit 73, München-Fröttmaning, there's a Berlin Bear statue placed on the median (48°12′14″N 11°37′14″E). Its equivalent is placed on the median of the A 115 (as the extension of the A 9 into Berlin) near former rest area Dreilinden, north of the former checkpoint Bravo 52°25′05″N 13°11′47″E.

At the entrance to the rest area "Köschinger Forst", direction Berlin, there's a milestone with the inscription Berlin - 500 km.
