= Thomas Sanderling =

German conductor (born 1942)

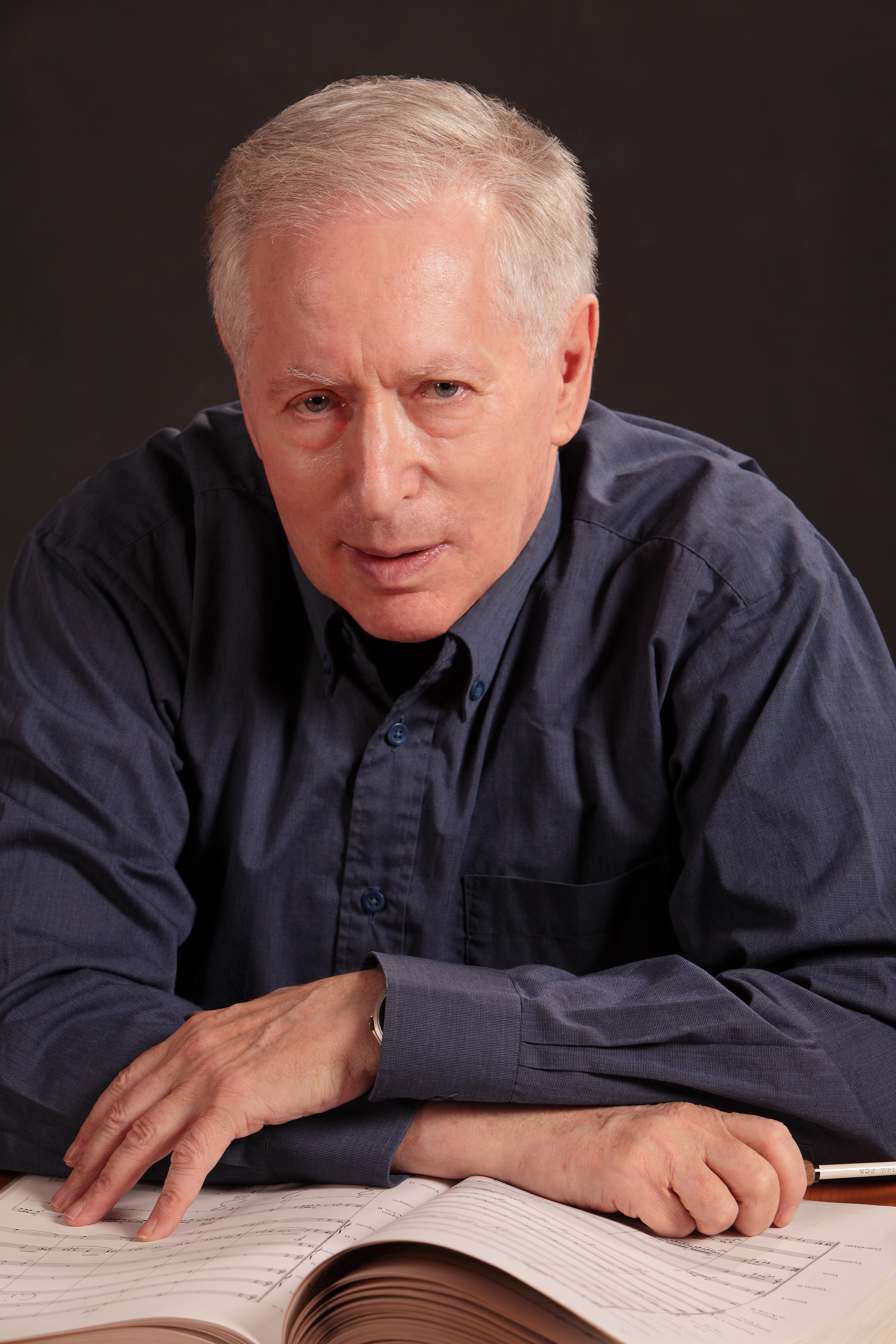
- Born: Novosibirsk, Soviet Union
- Occupation: Conductor
- Organizations: Sony BMG, Deutsche Grammophon

Thomas Sanderling (Russian: Томас Куртович Зандерлинг, romanized: Tomas Kurtovich Zanderling; born October 2, 1942) is a German conductor born in the Soviet Union.

== Life and career ==
Sanderling was born in Novosibirsk (Russian Soviet Federative Socialist Republic, Soviet Union). His father was the conductor Kurt Sanderling. His half-brothers are the conductors Stefan Sanderling and Michael Sanderling.

He began his education by studying violin at the special school of the Leningrad Conservatory. In 1960, he began his studies at the Hochschule für Musik "Hanns Eisler" in Berlin. In 1962, after winning a national conducting competition, he made his debut as a conductor, followed by further studies with Hans Swarowsky. He was assistant to Herbert von Karajan and Leonard Bernstein.

Sanderling started his career in Sondershausen and Reichenbach, before being appointed music director in Halle/Saale in 1966. In 1978, he made his debut at the Wiener Staatsoper and later at the Bayerische Staatsoper. He served as principal guest conductor at the Deutsche Staatsoper Berlin from 1978 to 1983. He moved to the Federal Republic of Germany in 1983. Between 1984 and 1986, he was principal conductor and artistic advisor of the Amsterdam Philharmonisch Orkest.

Sanderling has served as principal guest conductor of the Philharmonic Orchestra Novosibirsk, and of the National Philharmonic Orchestra of Russia. In 1992, he became music director of the Osaka Symphony Orchestra. He twice won the Grand Prix of Osaka critics' prize. The orchestra awarded him the title of lifetime music director laureate. In May 2013, Sanderling conducted the world premiere of the last opera by Mieczysław Weinberg, Der Idiot after the novel by Dostoyevsky, at the Nationaltheater Mannheim. In July 2017, the Novosibirsk Philharmonic Orchestra announced the appointment of Sanderling as its next chief conductor and music director, effective August 2017.

Sanderling has a particular relationship with the music of Dmitri Shostakovich, and to Shostakovich himself. Shostakovich attended Sanderling's Moscow debut, and subsequently asked him to conduct the German first performances of his Symphonies No. 13 and 14. Sanderling also made the first German translation of both symphonies' texts, with the composer's authorisation. Sandering has recorded commercially Shostakovich's Michelangelo Suite, and song cycles for orchestra on Deutsche Grammophon.
