= Gasthof Herold =

Brewery in Büchenbach, Bavaria, Germany

Brauerei-Gasthof Herold
- Interactive map of Brauerei-Gasthof Herold
- Location: Marktstraße 29, Pegnitz-Büchenbach, Germany
- Opened: 1568
- Key people: 49°47′39.5″N 11°30′34″E
- Annual production volume: 1,200 hectolitres (1,000 US bbl)
- Website: beckn-bier.de

Gasthof Herold is one of the oldest breweries in Büchenbach, Bavaria, Germany, founded in 1568.

Since the foundation it is a family business today managed by Johann und Matthias Herold and the annual production is about 1200 hl.

The part of the business is a bakery, restaurant and a beer garden.

== See also ==
- List of oldest companies
