= Pegnitz =

Pegnitz may refer to:

- Pegnitz (river) in Germany
- Pegnitz (town), a town in Germany
