= Holzland (disambiguation) =

Holzland (Palatinate) is a region in the Palatine Forest, Rhineland-Palatinate, Germany.

Holzland may also refer to:

- Holzland Railway, also known as Weimar–Gera railway, in Thuringia, Germany
- Thuringian Holzland, an upland region in the state of Thuringia, Germany
- Saale-Holzland-Kreis, a district in the east of Thuringia, Germany
