= Hermsdorf (Verwaltungsgemeinschaft) =

- Verwaltungsgemeinschaft
- Map of Saale-Holzland highlighting Hermsdorf
- Interactive map of Hermsdorf
- Location within Germany Location within Thuringia
- Coordinates: 50°54′N 11°51′E
- Country: Germany
- State: Thuringia
- District: Saale-Holzland
- Seat: Hermsdorf
- Subdivisions: 5 municipalities

Area
  - Total: 35.48 km^{2} (13.70 sq mi)

Population (2025-12-31)
  - Total: 11,185
  - Density: 315.2/km^{2} (816.5/sq mi)
- Time zone: UTC+01:00 (CET)
  - Summer (DST): UTC+02:00 (CEST)
- Website: www.vg-hermsdorf.de

Hermsdorf (German pronunciation: [ˈhɛʁmsˌdɔʁf]) is a Verwaltungsgemeinschaft ("collective municipality") in the district Saale-Holzland, in Thuringia, Germany. The seat of the Verwaltungsgemeinschaft is in Hermsdorf.

== Municipalities ==
The Verwaltungsgemeinschaft Hermsdorf consists of the following municipalities:

1. Hermsdorf
2. Mörsdorf
3. Reichenbach
4. Schleifreisen
5. Sankt Gangloff
