= Sankt Gangloff =

- Municipality
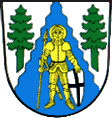
- Coat of arms

- Location of Sankt Gangloff within Saale-Holzland-Kreis district
- Interactive map of Sankt Gangloff
- Location within Germany Location within Thuringia
- Coordinates: 50°51′N 11°54′E
- Country: Germany
- State: Thuringia
- District: Saale-Holzland-Kreis
- Municipal assoc.: Hermsdorf

Government
  - Mayor (2022–28): Frank Wiedenhöft

Area
  - Total: 9.45 km^{2} (3.65 sq mi)
- Elevation: 330 m (1,080 ft)

Population (2025-12-31)
  - Total: 1,137
  - Density: 120/km^{2} (312/sq mi)
- Time zone: UTC+01:00 (CET)
  - Summer (DST): UTC+02:00 (CEST)
- Postal codes: 07629
- Dialling codes: 036606
- Vehicle registration: SHK, EIS, SRO
- Website: www.vg-hermsdorf.de

Sankt Gangloff or St. Gangloff is a municipality in the district Saale-Holzland, in Thuringia, Germany.

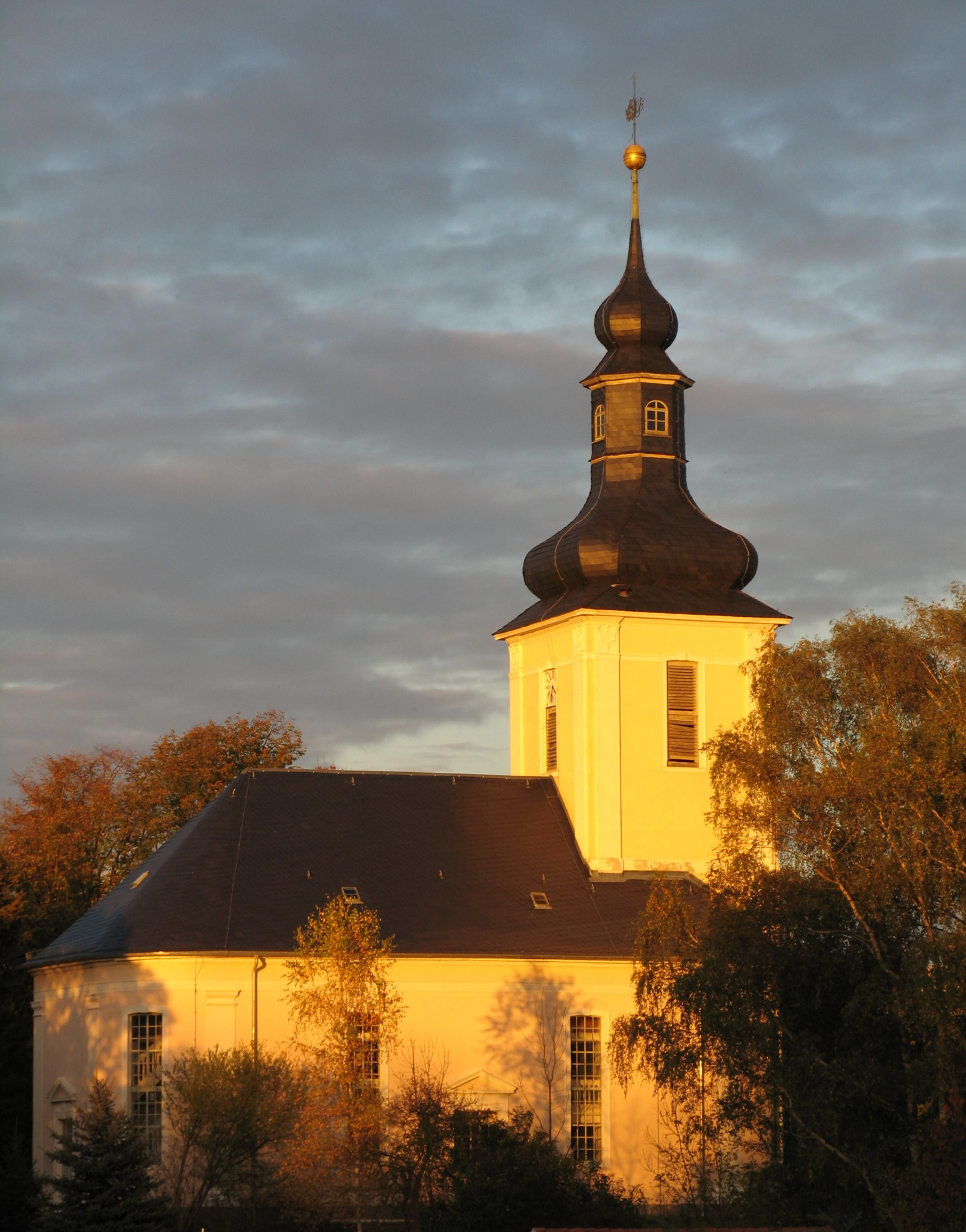
Church of St. Gangloff
