= Pegnitz (town) =

- Town
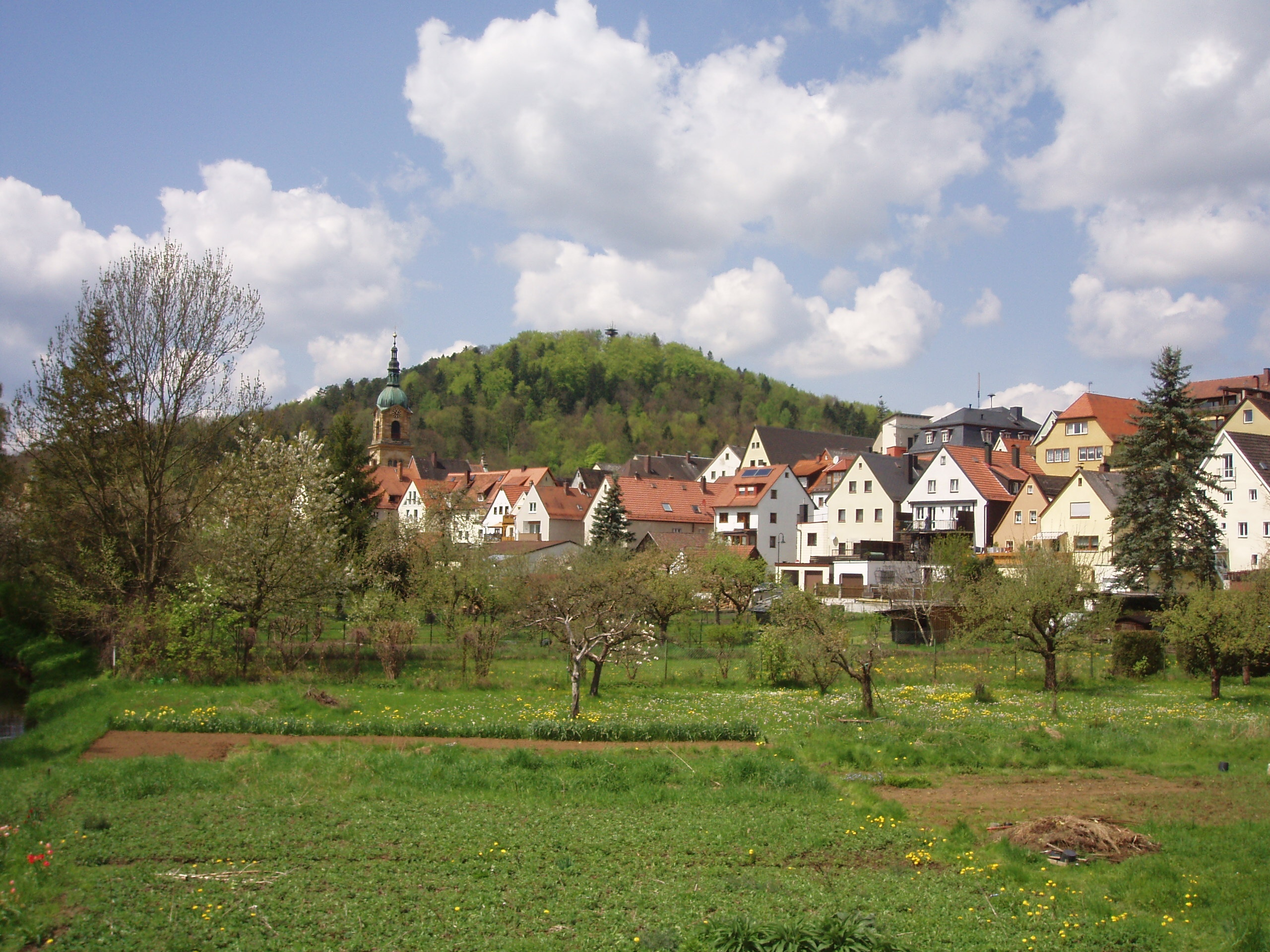
- Pegnitz with Church of Saint Bartholomew on the left and castle hill in the background

- Coat of arms

- Location of Pegnitz within Bayreuth district
- Interactive map of Pegnitz
- Location within Germany Location within Bavaria
- Coordinates: 49°45′23″N 11°32′42″E
- Country: Germany
- State: Bavaria
- Admin. region: Oberfranken
- District: Bayreuth
- Subdivisions: 36 Ortsteile

Government
  - Mayor (2020–26): Wolfgang Nierhoff

Area
  - Total: 99.98 km^{2} (38.60 sq mi)
- Elevation: 422 m (1,385 ft)

Population (2025-12-31)
  - Total: 13,614
  - Density: 136.2/km^{2} (352.7/sq mi)
- Time zone: UTC+01:00 (CET)
  - Summer (DST): UTC+02:00 (CEST)
- Postal codes: 91257
- Dialling codes: 09241
- Vehicle registration: BT, EBS, ESB, KEM, MÜB, PEG
- Website: www.pegnitz.de

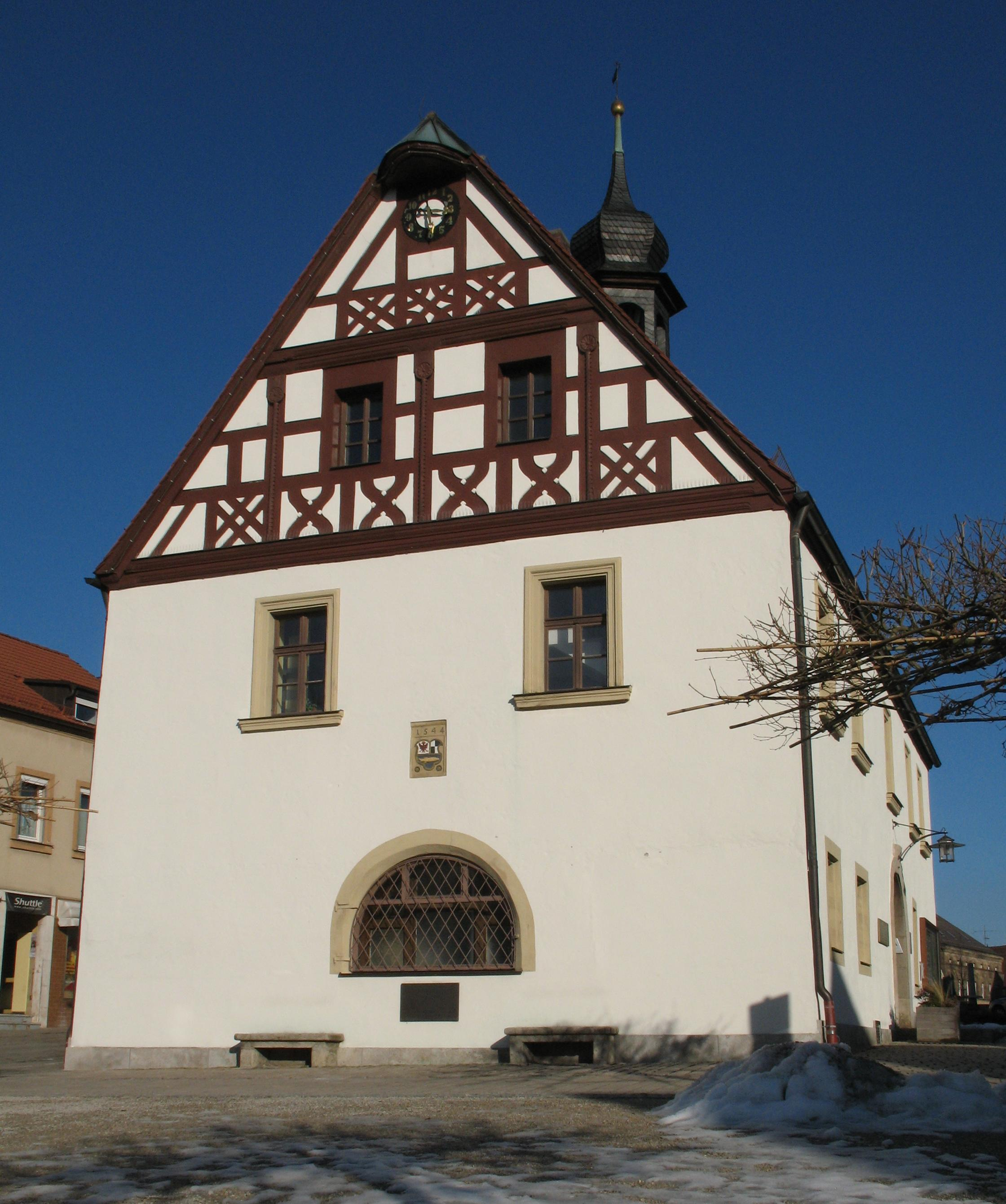
Old town hall

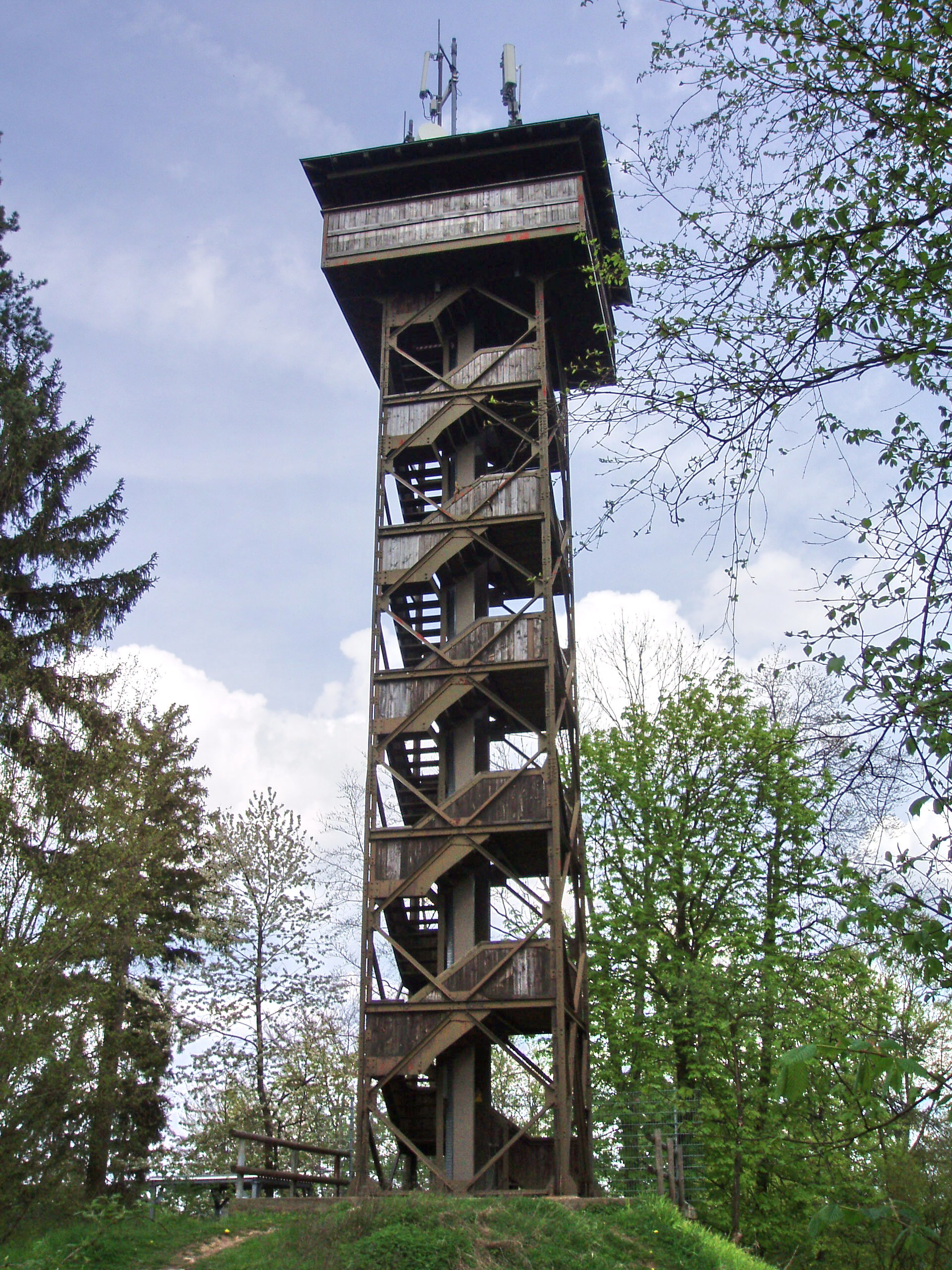
The 1923 observation tower

Pegnitz (German: [ˈpeːɡnɪts]) is a town in the Bayreuth district in Upper Franconia, Bavaria, Germany, with a population of approximately 15,000 inhabitants. It is also the source of the river Pegnitz. The city Bayreuth is about 27 km to the north.

The villages (Ortsteile) in Pegnitz are:

- Bodendorf
- Bronn
- Buchau
- Büchenbach
- Hainbronn
- Hammerbühl
- Hedelmühle
- Heroldsreuth
- Herrenmühle
- Horlach
- Hufeisen
- Kaltenthal
- Kleinkrausmühle
- Körbeldorf
- Kosbrunn
- Kotzenhammer
- Langenreuth
- Leups
- Lobensteig
- Lüglas
- Nemschenreuth
- Neudorf
- Neuhof
- Penzenreuth
- Pertenhof
- Reisach
- Stein
- Stemmenreuth
- Trockau
- Troschenreuth
- Vestenmühle
- Weidelwangermühle
- Weidmannshöhe
- Willenberg
- Willenreuth
- Zips

Annual events are the Christmas market, the Open-Air Rock Festival Waldstock, and above all, the seasonal strong-beer festival called Flinderer.
