= Berlin Milestone =

Monuments with mileage to Berlin

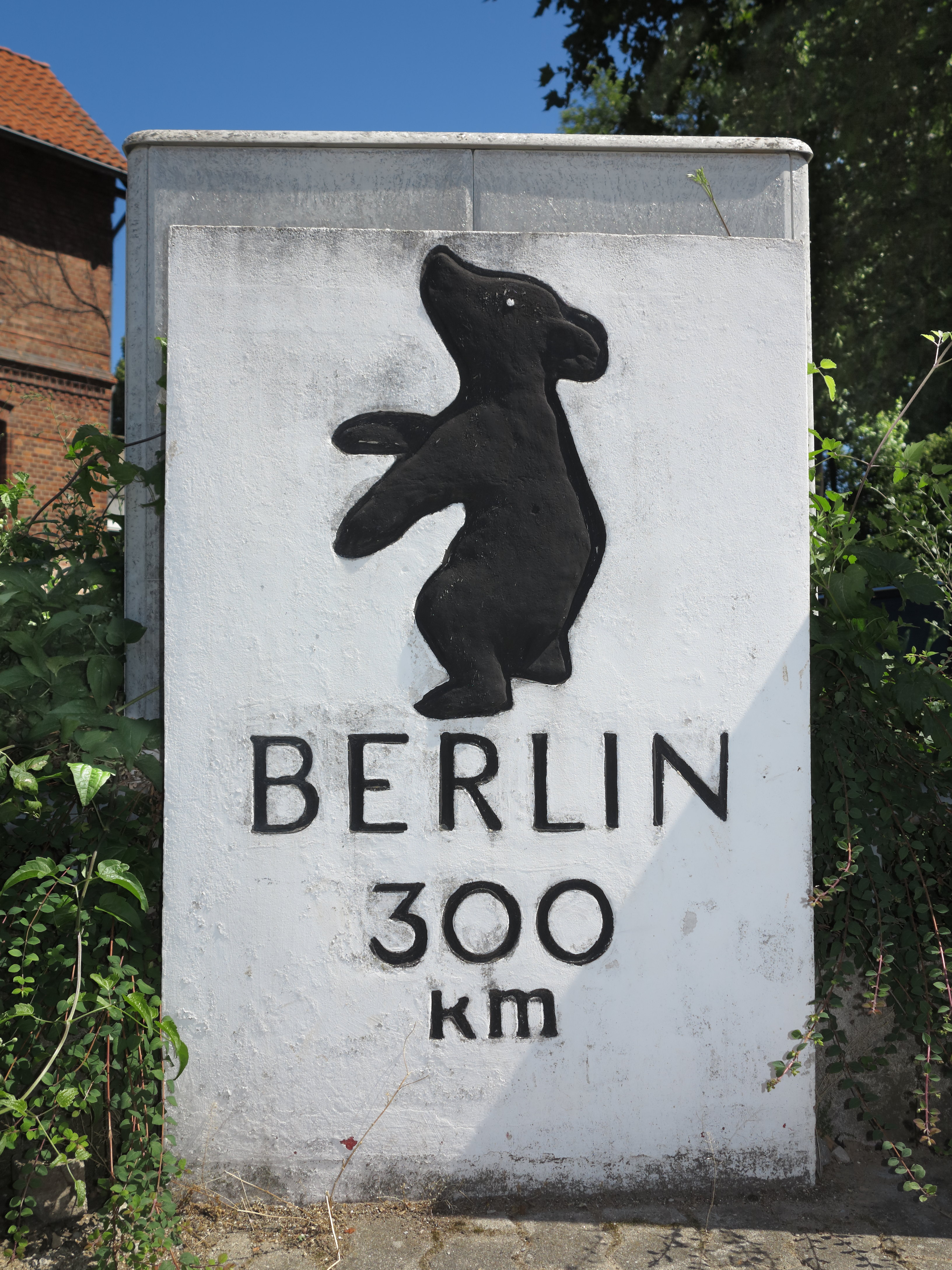
A typical Berlin Milestone

The Berlin Milestones (German: Berliner Meilensteine) are small monuments with mileage to the German capital Berlin. At the time of German division in the second half of 20th century, the milestones were furnished in numerous location in former West Germany. It has the Berlin Bear (Coat of arms of Berlin) on it. After the German Reunification it remained as a memorial of the history of German division. Many of the monuments are located on highways and federal roads.

== History ==
The Berlin Milestones go back on initiative of the politician Gerd Bucerius, who was the chairman of the parliamentary committee for Berlin. Hans-Christoph Seebohm, then federal transport minister ordered the setting up of Berlin Milestones in 1953, which should contain the Berlin Bear with numbers of mileages to Berlin on the front.

To ensure West Berlin, which was surrounded by East Germany, remained in public awareness and to promote solidarity with the cities in West Germany, memorial stones with the depiction of the Berlin Bear and an indication of the distance to Berlin should be set up on the central reservation of the federal motorways at intervals of 100 kilometers.

== Locations ==
There are about 270 Berlin milestones worldwide.

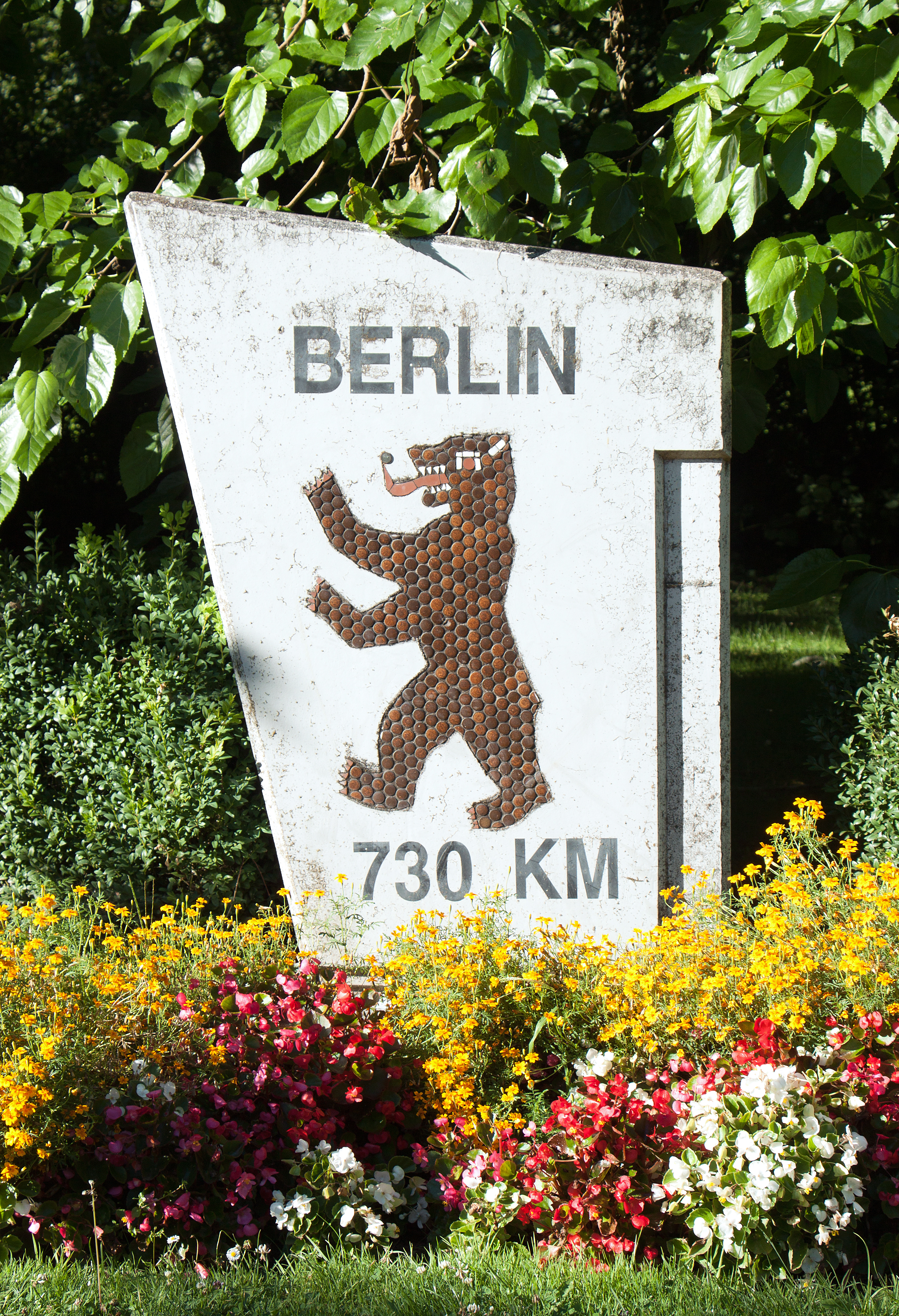
Berlin Milestone in Bad Bergzabern at Kurpark

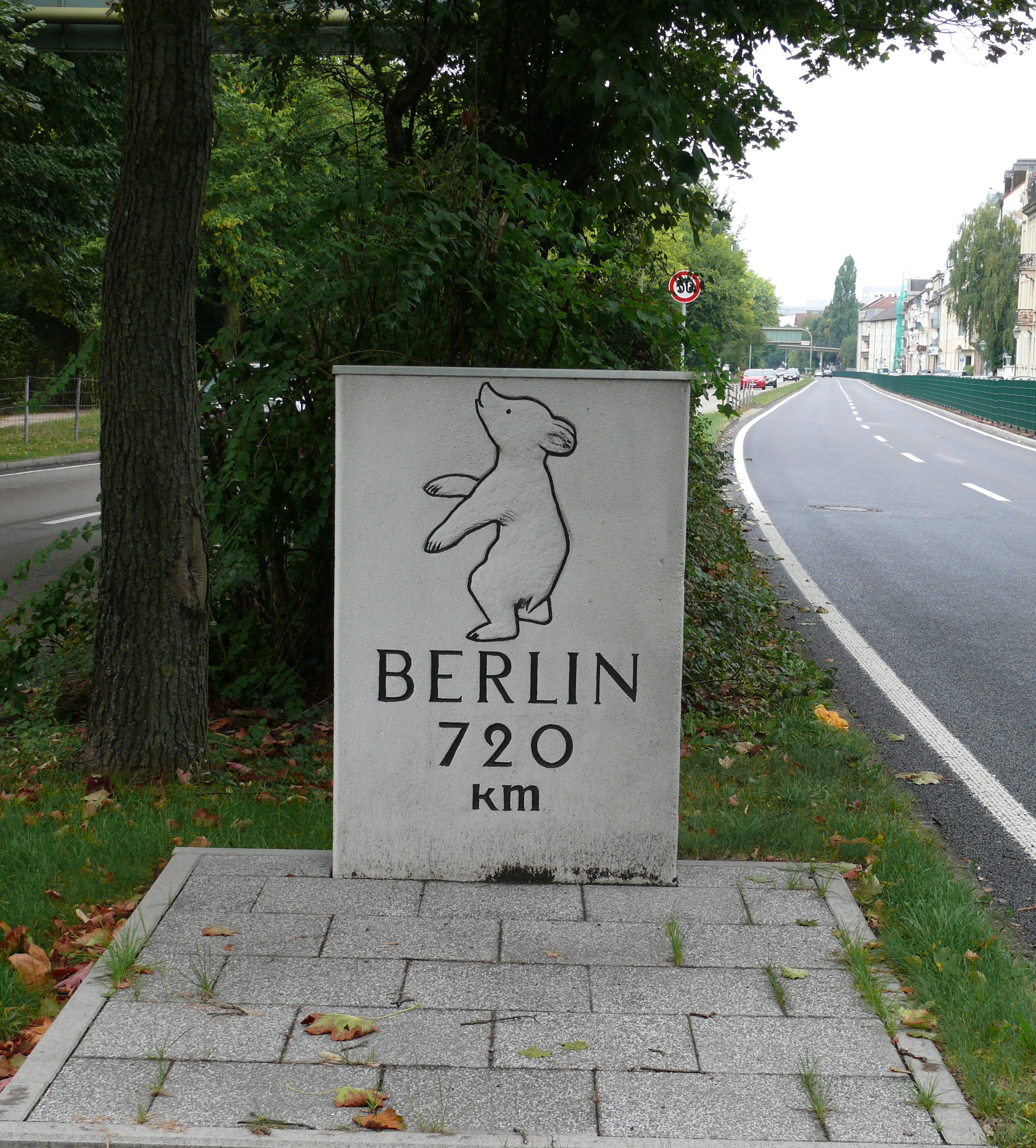
Berlin Milestone in Baden-Baden

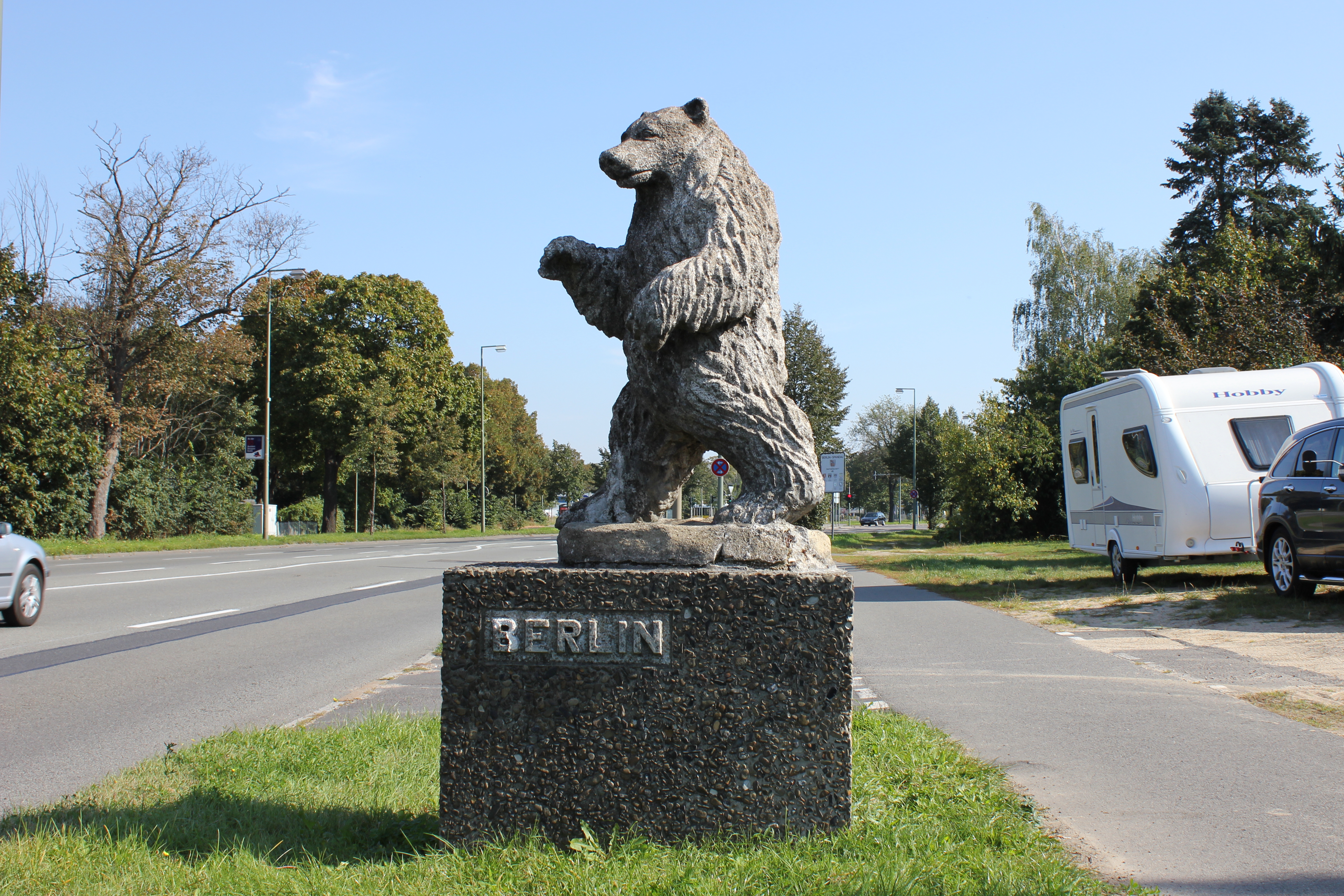
Monument of Berlin Bear in Berlin-Staaken at the city entry

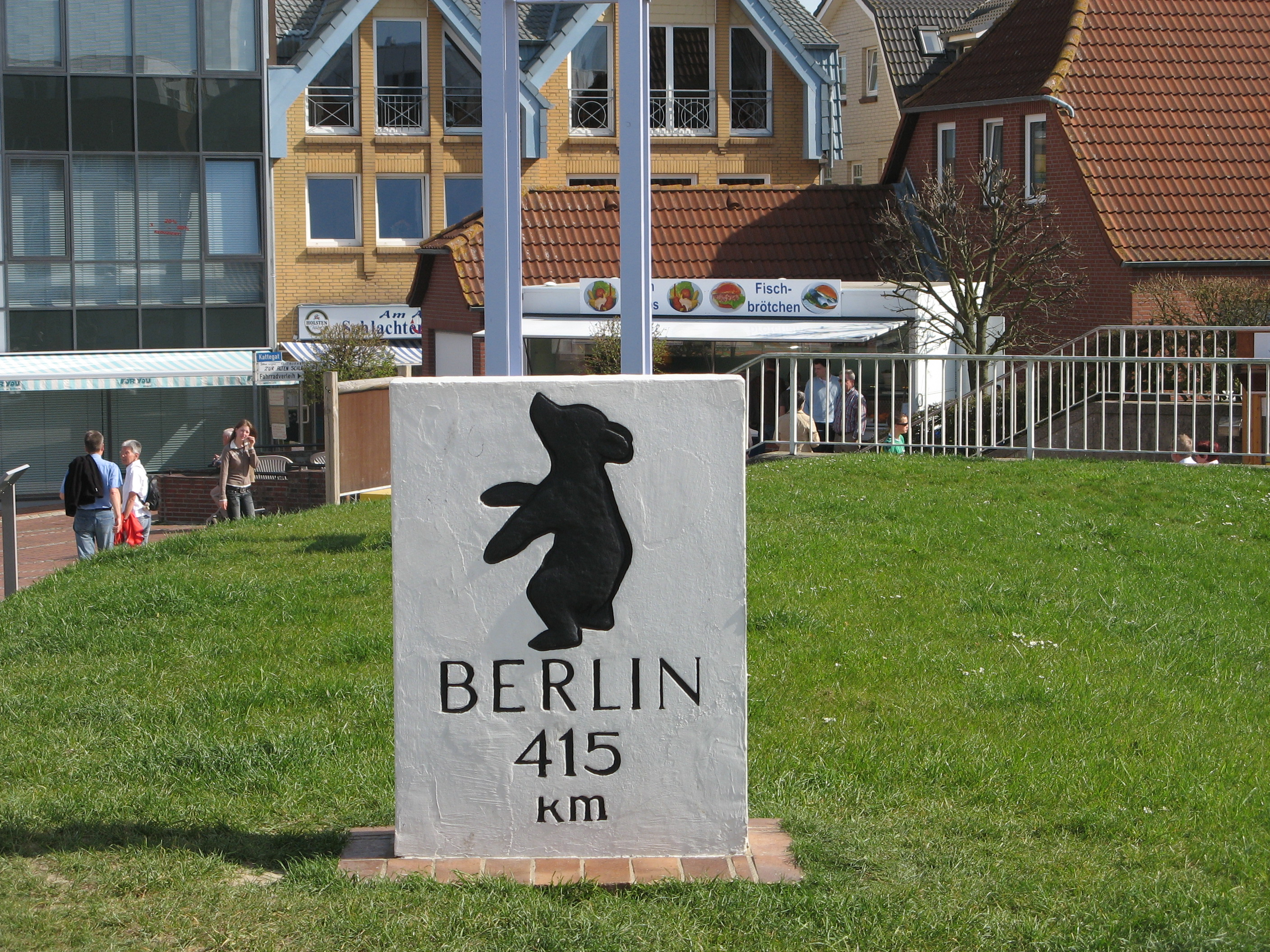
Berlin Milestone in Büsum near North Sea

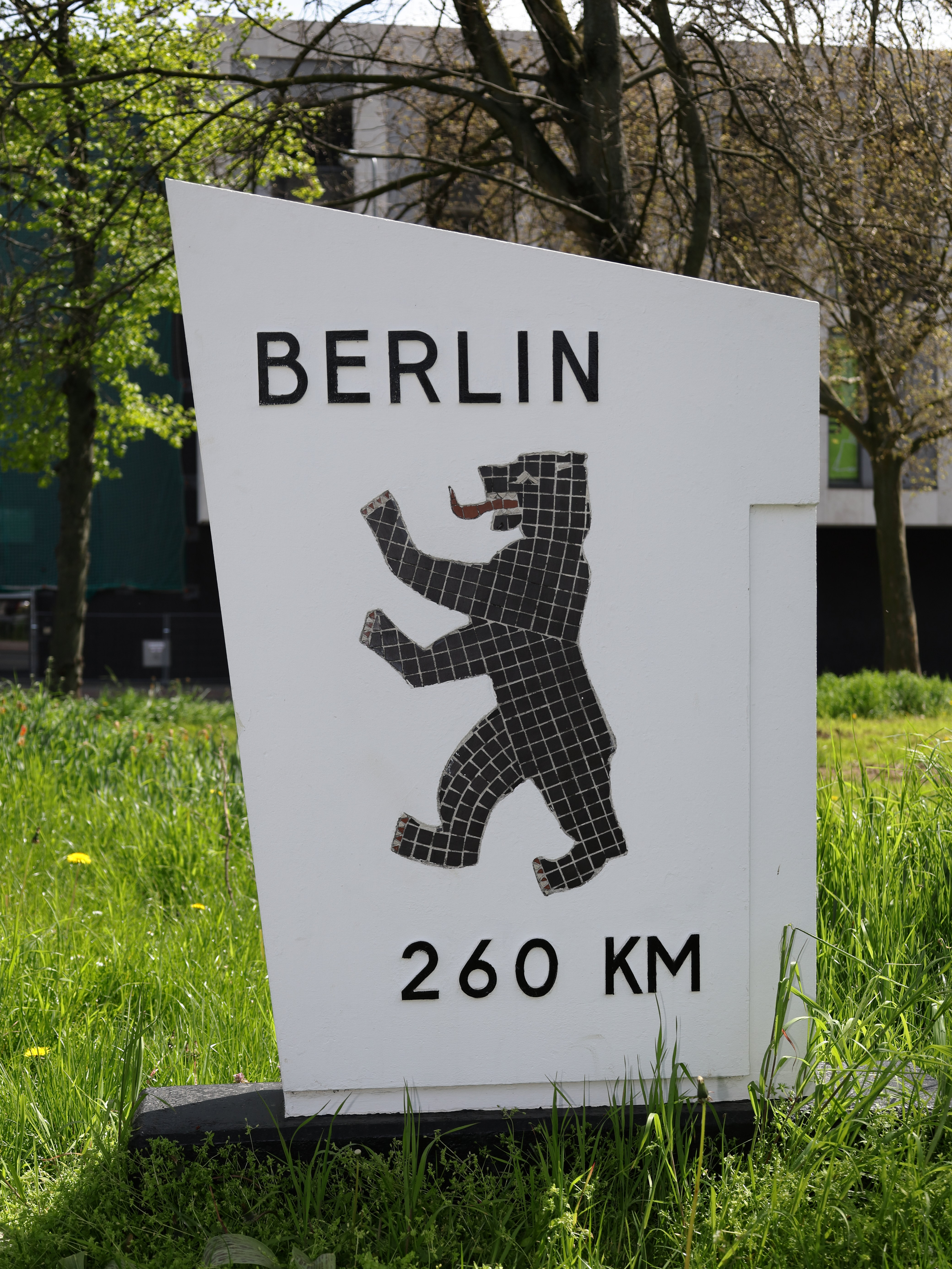
Berlin Milestone in Hildesheim

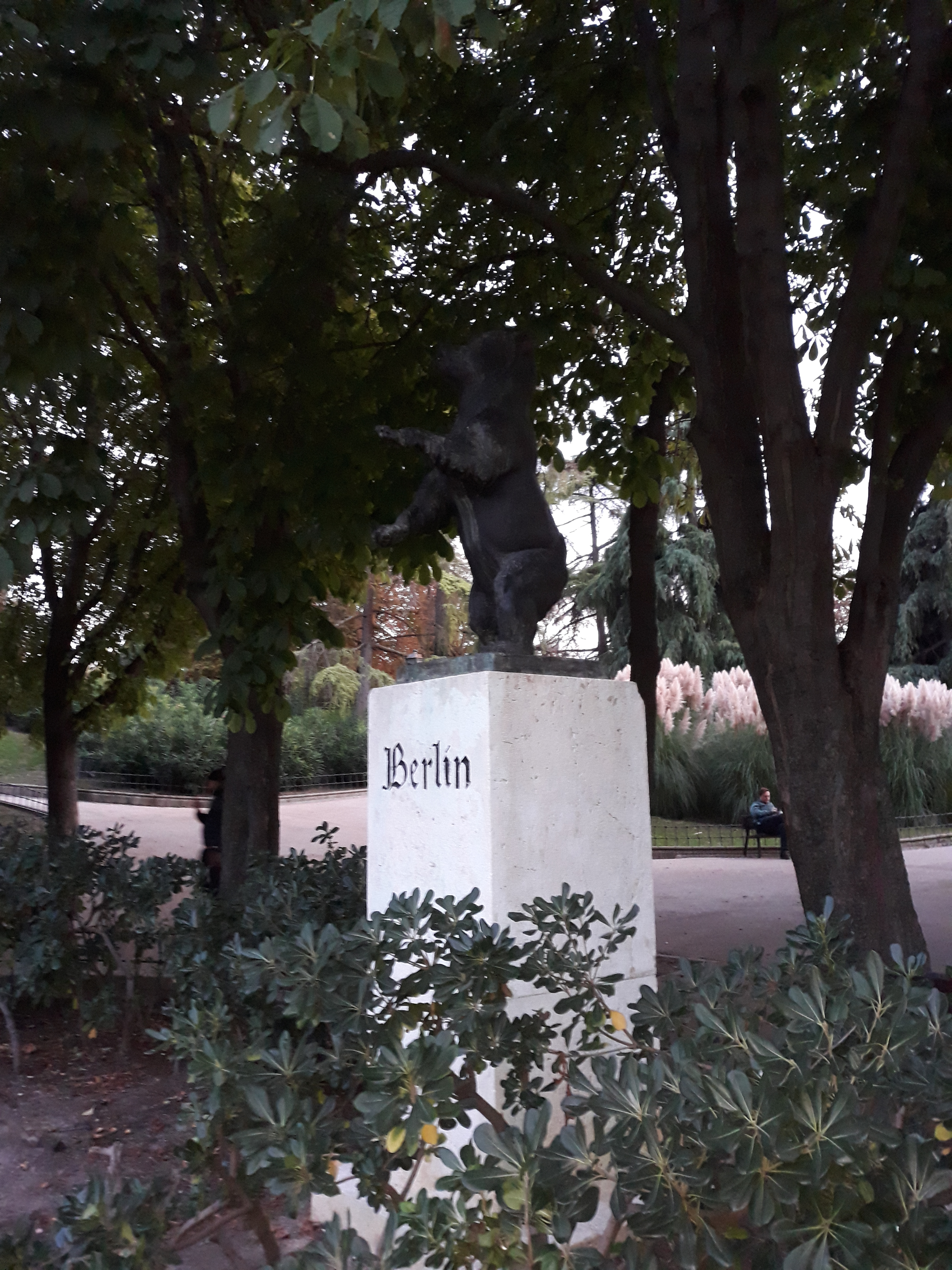
Monument of Berlin Bear in Madrid, Spain

=== Germany ===
==== Aachen ====
- Monument of Berlin Bear made in 1964 (restored in 1998) located on freeway access A544.

Location: 50.78497°N 6.12591°E

==== Bad Bergzabern ====
- Milestone of Berlin with mileage of 730 km located on Kurpark.

==== Baden-Baden ====
- Milestone of Berlin with mileage of 720 km located on federal road B500.

Location: 48.77260°N 8.22383°E

==== Berlin ====
- Monument of Berlin Bear located in the borough of Nikolassee at the highway A115 near Checkpoint Bravo.

Location: 52.41844°N 13.19647°E

- Monument of Berlin Bear located in the borough of Staaken in Spandau district located on the entry of Berlin on B5.

Location: 52.52889°N 13.11995°E

==== Bielefeld ====
- Milestone of Berlin with mileage of 397 km located on Willy-Brandt-Platz.

Location: 52.02687°N 8.53539°E

==== Bonn ====
- Milestone of Berlin with mileage of 570 km located on the "Berliner Freiheit" (Berlin freedom) avenue.

Location: 50.73768°N 7.10336°E

==== Braunschweig ====
- Milestone of Berlin with mileage of 229 km located near the central station.

Location: 52.25325°N 10.53879°E

==== Büsum ====
- Milestone of Berlin with mileage of 415 km located on the pedestrian zone on the holiday city at North Sea.

Location: 54.12823°N 8.85767°E

==== Düsseldorf ====
- Monument of Berlin Bear located on Berliner Allee.

Location: 51.21777°N 6.78227°E

==== Essen ====
- Monument of Berlin Bear with citation "Denkt an Berlin" (Think of Berlin).

Location: 51.45899°N 7.00361°E

==== Frankfurt am Main ====
- Milestone of Berlin with mileage of 550 km and a sign board near the Frankfurt Airport.

Location: 50.03369°N 8.59280°E

==== Hanover ====
- Milestone of Berlin with mileage of 280 km located on Berliner Allee.

Location: 52.37007°N 9.75310°E

==== Heide ====
- Milestone of Berlin with mileage of 408 km located near the city centre.

Location: 54.19546°N 9.09816°E

==== Helgoland ====
- Monument of Berlin Bear and the mileage of 456 km in the milestone located on the island of Helgoland at North Sea.

Location: 54.18045°N 7.88641°E

==== Hildesheim ====
- Milestone of Berlin with mileage of 260 km located near the city centre.

Location: 52.15467°N 9.94802°E

==== Kassel ====
- Milestone of Berlin with mileage of 362 km located on the square of German unity.

Location: 51.31095°N 9.51208°E

==== Lübeck ====
- Milestone of Berlin with mileage of 318 km located on Berliner Platz (Berlin square).

Location: 53.85133°N 10.68239°E

==== Mainz ====
- Milestone of Berlin with mileage of 563 km located on the access to Theodor Heuss Bridge.

Location: 50.00364°N 8.27431°E

==== Mannheim ====
- Milestone of Berlin with mileage of 618 km located on the Wilhelm Varnhort avenue.

Location: 49.47632°N 8.49537°E

==== Munich ====
- Monument of Berlin Bear with "Munich Berlin" on it located on A9 which connects Munich to Berlin.

Location: 48.20369°N 11.62061°E

==== Münster ====
- Monument of Berlin Bear located on Berliner Platz (Berlin Square).

Location: 51.95626°N 7.63323°E

==== Saarbrücken ====
- Milestone of Berlin with mileage of 755 km located on the access to Wilhelm Heinrich Bridge.

Location: 49.23392°N 6.99311°E

==== Siegen ====
- Monument of Berlin with citation "Spandau dankt Siegen" (Spandau thanks Siegen). The district of Spandau in Berlin is twin town of Siegen since 1952.

Location: 50.87435°N 8.02027°E

==== Würzburg ====
- Milestone of Berlin with mileage of 493 km located on Berliner Platz (Berlin square).

Location: 49.79879°N 9.94360°E

==== Wuppertal ====
- Monument of Berlin with "Berliner Platz" (Berlin Square) on it located on Berlin square.

Location: 51.27522°N 7.22262°E

=== Outside Germany ===
==== Madrid ====
- Monument of Berlin Bear located in "Parque de Berlín" (Berlin Park).

Location: 40.45143°N 3.67499°E

== See also ==
- United Buddy Bears
- Coat of arms of Berlin
- West and East Germany
- History of Berlin
