= Trockau =

Coordinates: 49°49′24″N 11°29′34″E

Trockau is a village in the district of Bayreuth, in Bavaria, Germany, with about 550 inhabitants.

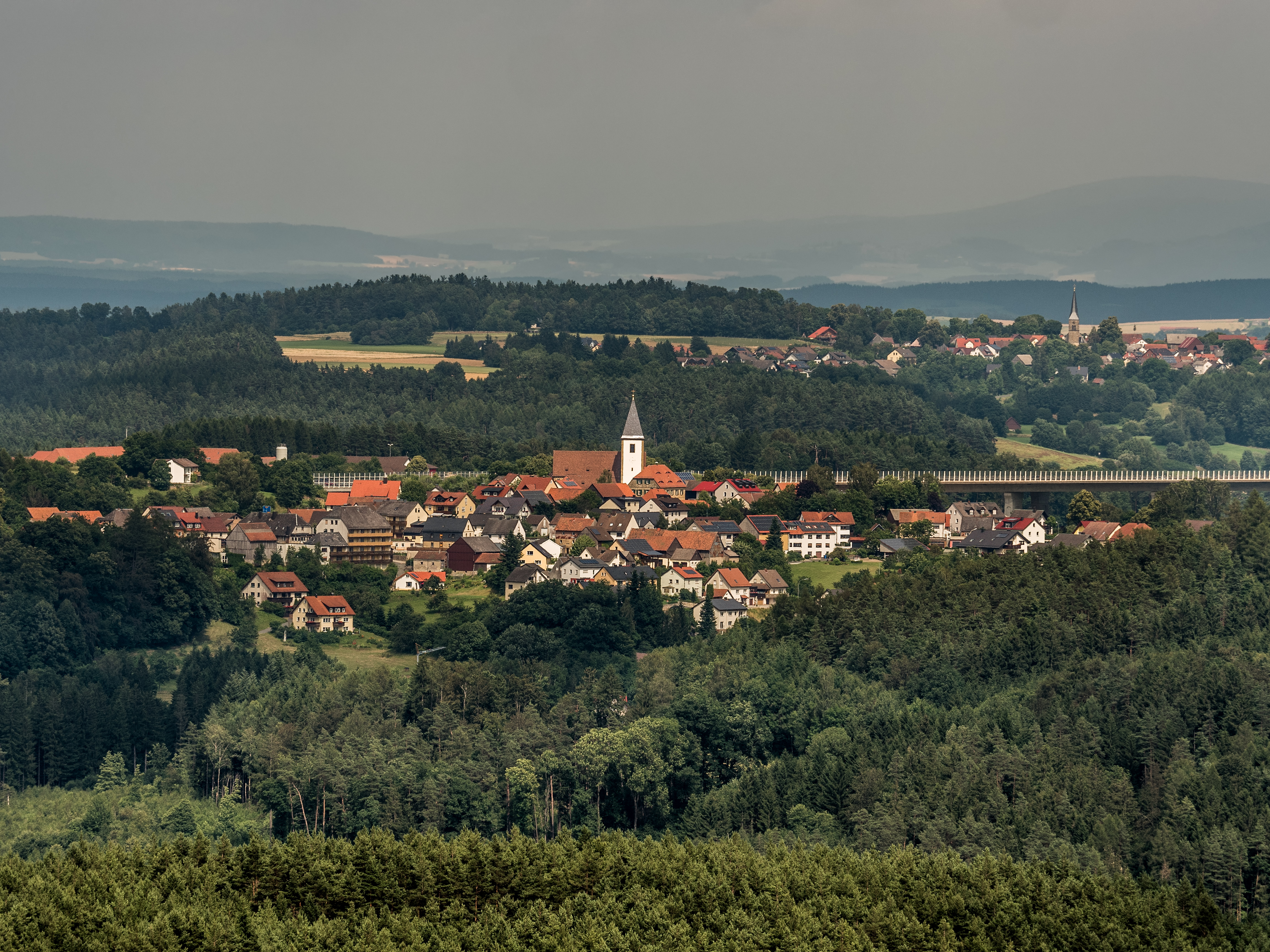
