= Schleifreisen =

- Municipality
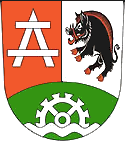
- Coat of arms

- Location of Schleifreisen within Saale-Holzland-Kreis district
- Interactive map of Schleifreisen
- Location within Germany Location within Thuringia
- Coordinates: 50°53′26″N 11°49′27″E
- Country: Germany
- State: Thuringia
- District: Saale-Holzland-Kreis
- Municipal assoc.: Hermsdorf

Government
  - Mayor (2022–28): Karsten Teller

Area
  - Total: 7.02 km^{2} (2.71 sq mi)
- Elevation: 330 m (1,080 ft)

Population (2025-12-31)
  - Total: 420
  - Density: 60/km^{2} (150/sq mi)
- Time zone: UTC+01:00 (CET)
  - Summer (DST): UTC+02:00 (CEST)
- Postal codes: 07629
- Dialling codes: 036601
- Vehicle registration: SHK, EIS, SRO
- Website: www.vg-hermsdorf.de

Schleifreisen is a municipality in the district Saale-Holzland, in Thuringia, Germany.
