= Hermsdorf, Thuringia =

Hermsdorf
- Town
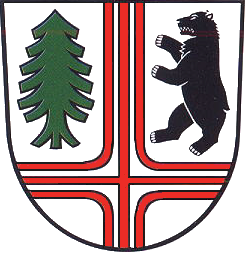
- Coat of arms

- Location of Hermsdorf within Saale-Holzland-Kreis district
- Interactive map of Hermsdorf
- Location within Germany Location within Thuringia
- Coordinates: 50°53′53″N 11°51′24″E
- Country: Germany
- State: Thuringia
- District: Saale-Holzland-Kreis
- Municipal assoc.: Hermsdorf

Government
  - Mayor (2024–30): Benny Hofmann (Ind.)

Area
  - Total: 7.49 km^{2} (2.89 sq mi)
- Elevation: 330 m (1,080 ft)

Population (2025-12-31)
  - Total: 8,210
  - Density: 1,100/km^{2} (2,840/sq mi)
- Time zone: UTC+01:00 (CET)
  - Summer (DST): UTC+02:00 (CEST)
- Postal codes: 07629
- Dialling codes: 036601
- Vehicle registration: SHK, EIS, SRO
- Website: www.hermsdorf-thueringen.de

Hermsdorf (German pronunciation: [ˈhɛʁmsˌdɔʁf]) is a town in the Saale-Holzland district of the state of Thuringia in eastern Germany. It is especially known for the motorway junction "Hermsdorfer Kreuz" where the two German autobahns A 4 (Frankfurt - Dresden) and A 9 (Berlin - Munich) meet.

Hermsdorf-Klosterlausnitz station is on the Weimar–Gera railway.

== Personalities ==
- Petra Lux (born 1956), civil rights activist and tai chi teacher
- Doreen Meier (born 1968), former East Germany international footballer
