= Nuremberg =

City in Bavaria, Germany

Nuremberg Nürnberg (German) Nämberch (Mainfränkisch)
- City
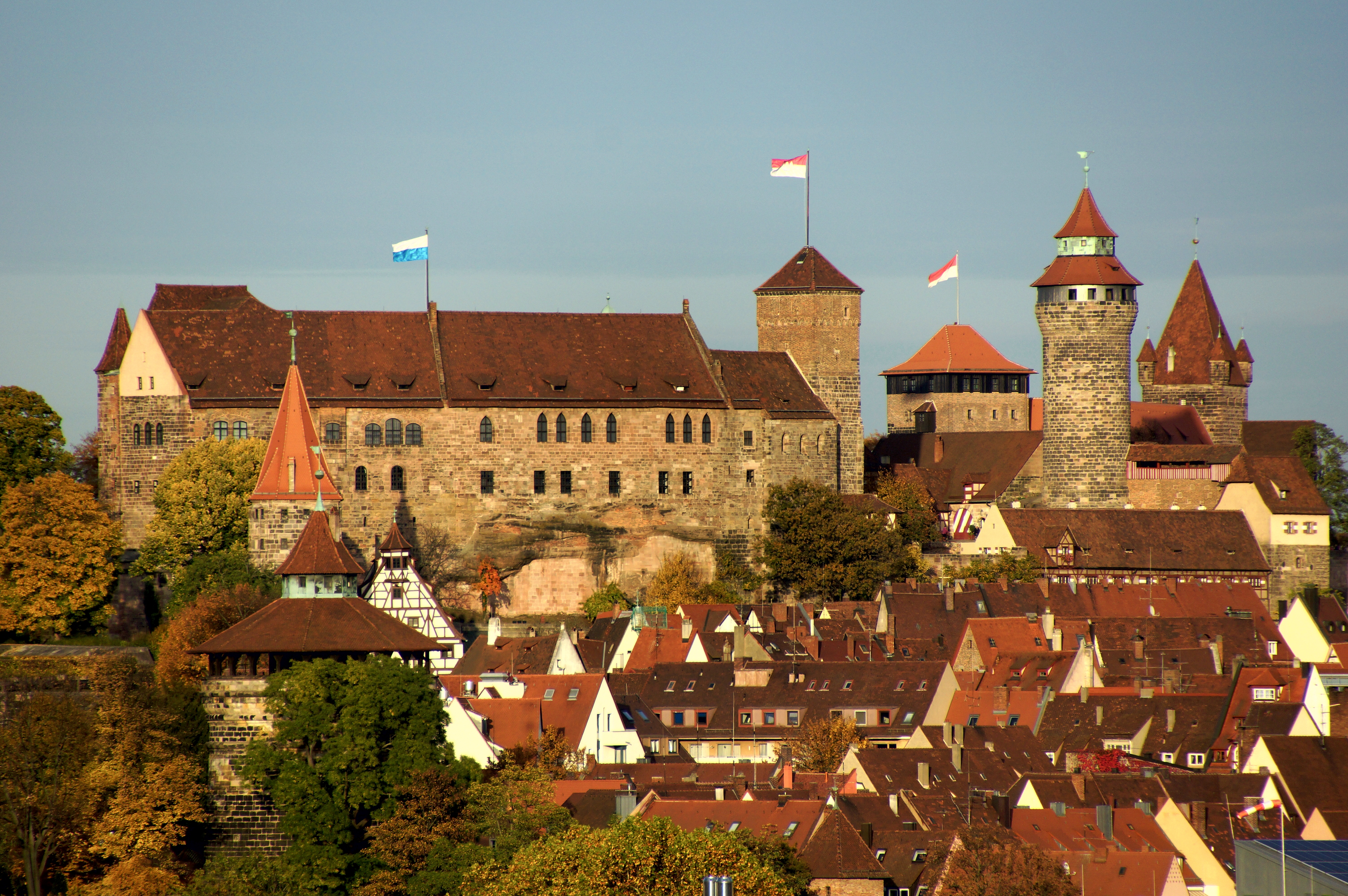
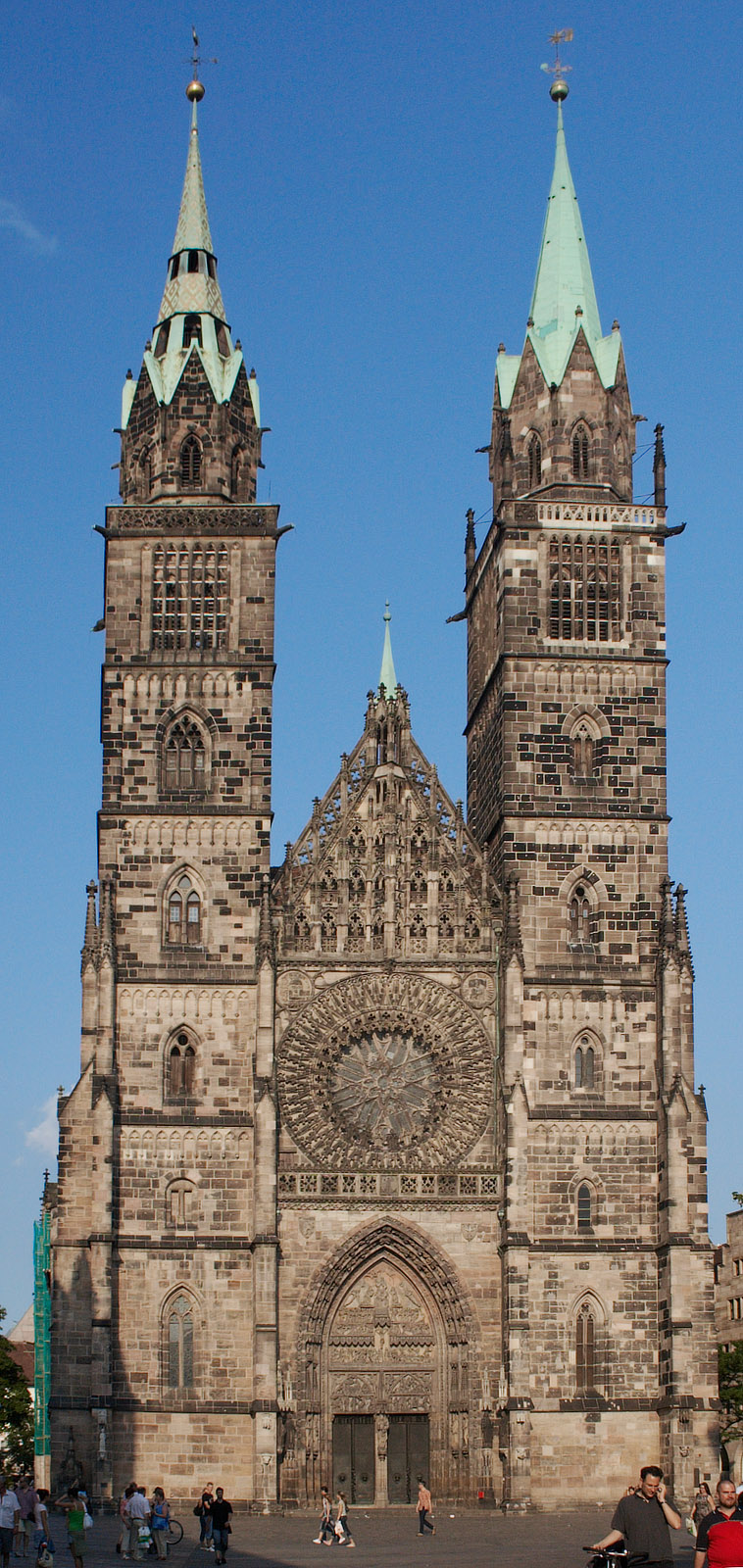
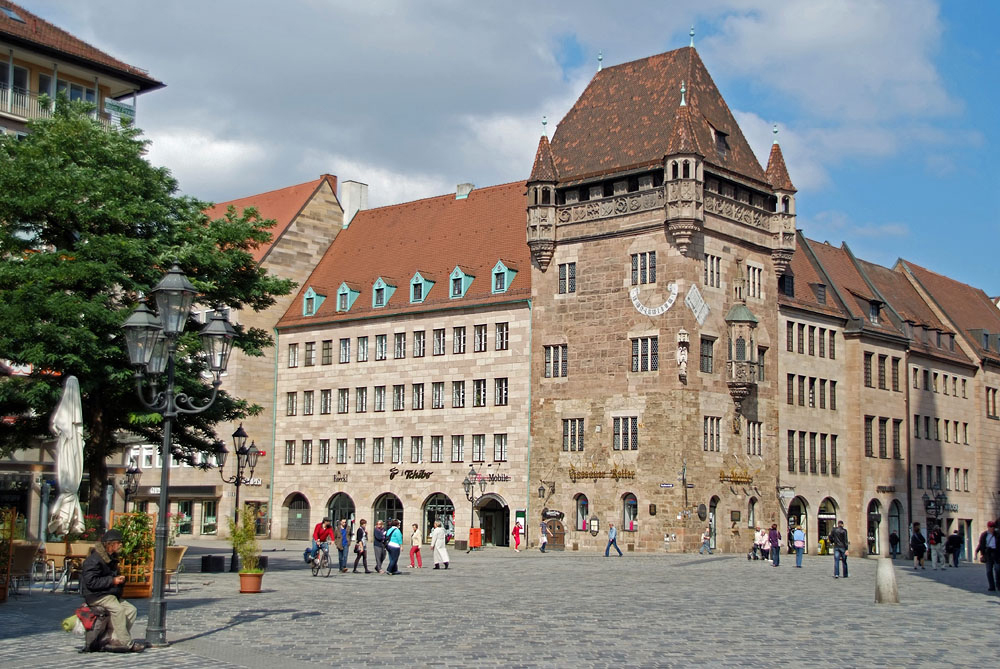
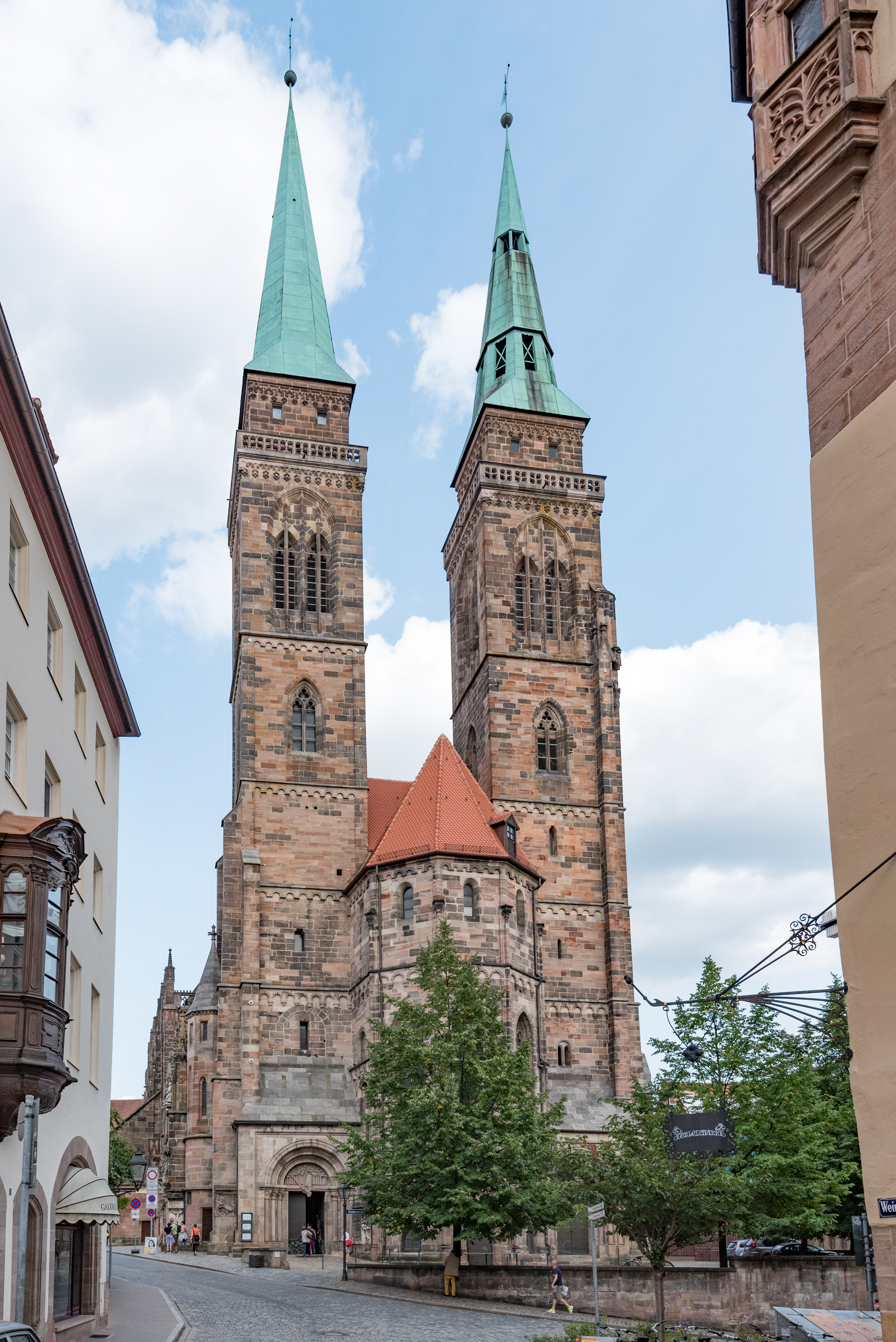
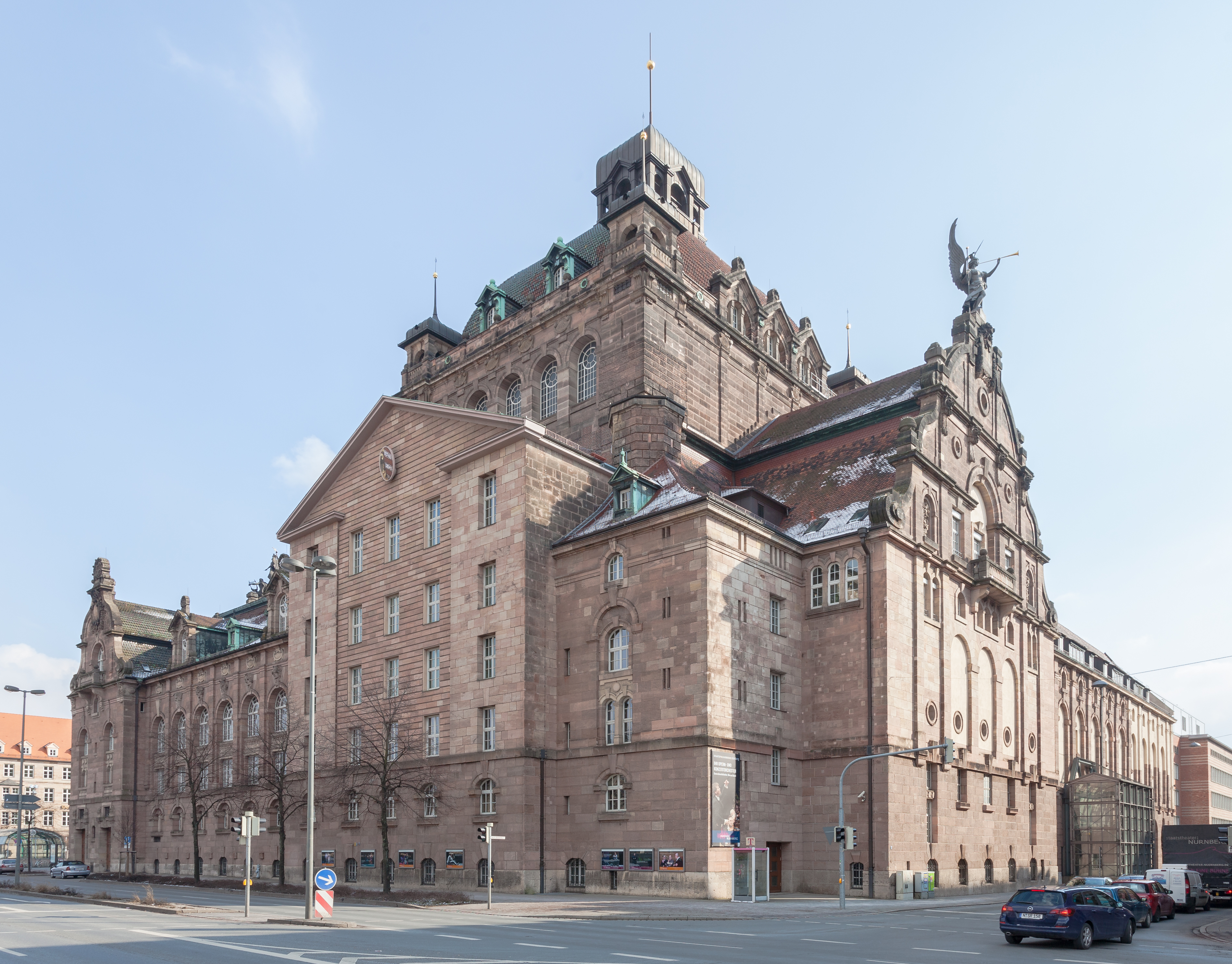
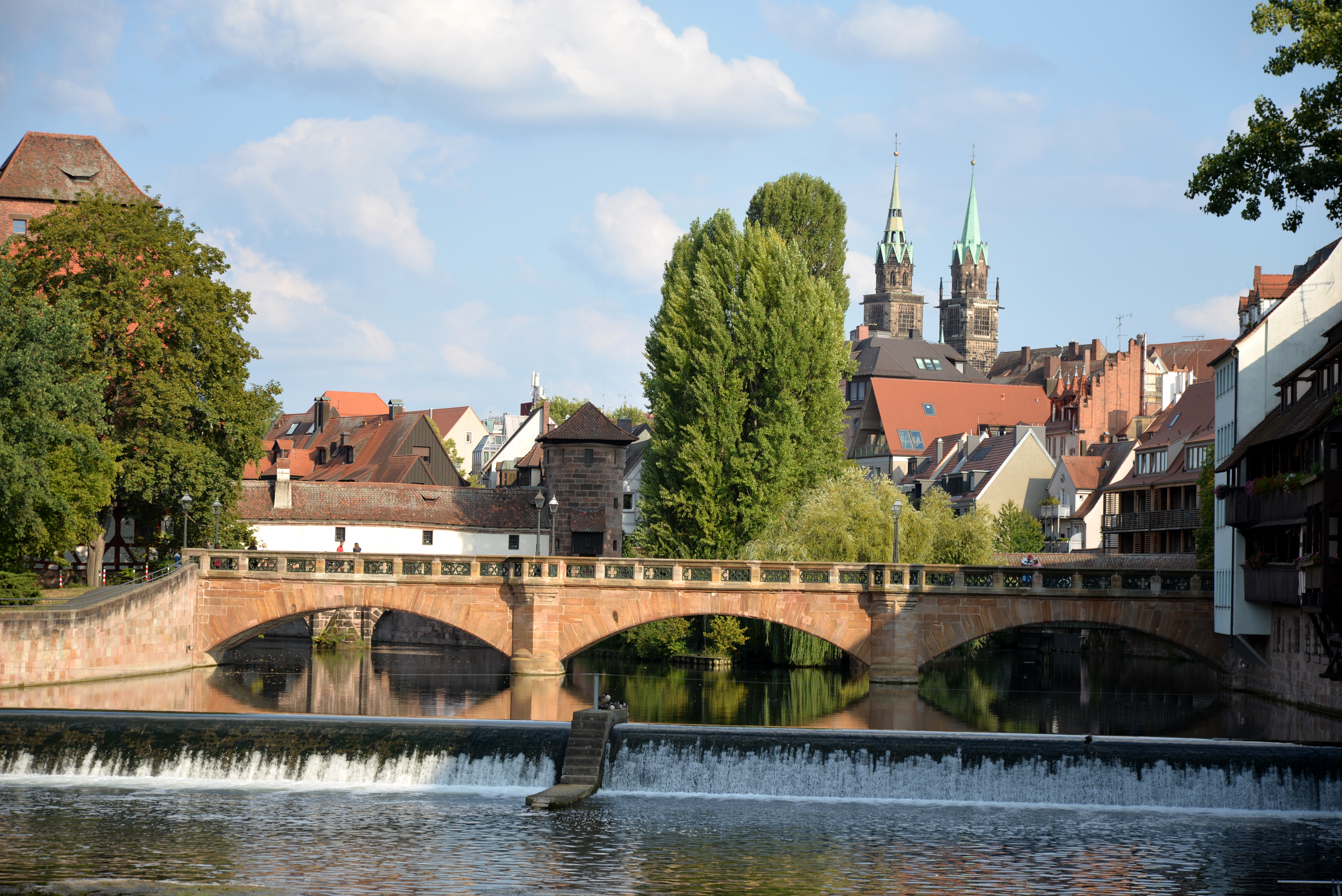
- Nuremberg Castle St. Lorenz Nassauer Haus St. Sebaldus Opera House Pegnitz River

- Flag Coat of arms
- Interactive map of Nuremberg
- Location within Germany Location within Bavaria
- Coordinates: 49°27′14″N 11°04′39″E
- Country: Germany
- State: Bavaria
- Admin. region: Middle Franconia
- District: Urban district
- Subdivisions: 10 districts

Government
  - Mayor (2026–32): Marcus König (CSU)

Area
  - City: 186.46 km^{2} (71.99 sq mi)
- Elevation: 302 m (991 ft)

Population (2025-12-31)
  - City: 531,159
  - Density: 2,848.6/km^{2} (7,378.0/sq mi)
  - Urban: 1,374,524
  - Metro: 3,610,543
- Time zone: UTC+01:00 (CET)
  - Summer (DST): UTC+02:00 (CEST)
- Postal codes: 90000-90491
- Dialling codes: 0911, 09122, 09129
- Vehicle registration: N
- Website: nuernberg.de

Nuremberg (/ˈnjʊərəmbɜːrɡ/ NURE-əm-burg; German: Nürnberg [ˈnʏʁnbɛʁk]; Mainfränkisch: Nämberch [ˈnɛmbɛrç]) is the second-largest city in the German state of Bavaria and the largest city in the cultural region of Franconia. Its 546,397 (2024) inhabitants make it the 13th-largest city in Germany. Situated on the Pegnitz, the city forms a continuous conurbation with the neighbouring cities of Fürth, Erlangen and Schwabach, with the built-up area comprising around 1.4 million inhabitants, while the larger Nuremberg Metropolitan Region has a population of approximately 3.6 million.

First mentioned in 1050, Nuremberg developed around an imperial castle into one of the most important cities of the Holy Roman Empire. It became a Free Imperial City in the 13th century. Owing to its political significance, imperial diets were frequently held there, and the Imperial Regalia were kept in the city from 1424 until the end of the empire. During the Late Middle Ages and the Renaissance, Nuremberg was also a centre of art, publishing, and scientific innovation, and was associated with figures such as Albrecht Dürer, Martin Behaim, Johann Pachelbel, and Hans Sachs. In the 20th century, it became known as the site of the Nuremberg rallies and, after the Second World War, the Nuremberg trials.

Nuremberg is a major centre of transport, education, and commerce in northern Bavaria. It is served by Nuremberg Airport, the second-busiest airport in Bavaria. Institutions of higher education in Nuremberg include the University of Erlangen-Nuremberg, Germany's 11th-largest university, Technische Hochschule Nürnberg, Hochschule für Musik Nürnberg, and the newly founded University of Technology Nuremberg. Nürnberg Messe ranks among Germany's largest trade-fair and convention organisers.

Nuremberg is known for its well-preserved medieval heritage, including Nuremberg Castle, the Old Town, and the city walls. It is an important cultural centre, with institutions such as the Staatstheater Nürnberg and the Staatsphilharmonie Nürnberg. 1. FC Nürnberg is among Germany's most successful football clubs. Nuremberg was one of the host cities of the 2006 FIFA World Cup.

== History ==
=== Middle Ages ===
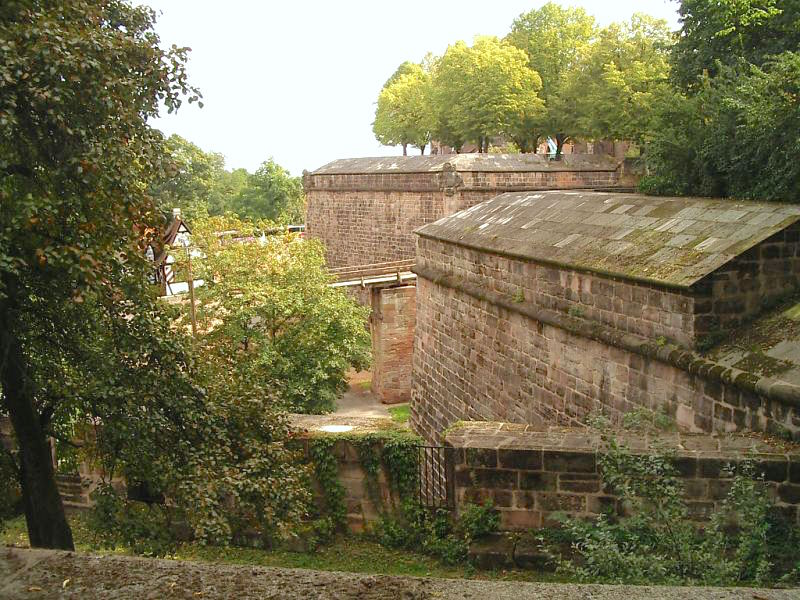
Old fortifications of Nuremberg

The first documentary mention of the city, in 1050, mentions Nuremberg as the location of an imperial castle between eastern Franconia and the Margraviate of the Nordgau of Bavaria. From 1050 to 1572 the city expanded and rose dramatically in importance due to its location on key trade-routes. King Conrad III, reigning as King of Germany from 1137 to 1152, established the Burgraviate of Nuremberg, with the first burgraves coming from the Austrian House of Raabs. With the extinction of their male line around 1189, the last Raabs count's son-in-law, Frederick I of the House of Hohenzollern, inherited the burgraviate in 1193.

From the late 12th century to the Interregnum (1254–1273), however, the power of the burgraves diminished as the Hohenstaufen emperors transferred most non-military powers to a castellan, with the city administration and the municipal courts handed over to an Imperial mayor (German: Reichsschultheiß) from 1173/74. The strained relations between the burgraves and the castellans, with gradual transferral of powers to the latter in the late 14th and early 15th centuries, finally broke out into open enmity, which greatly influenced the history of the city.

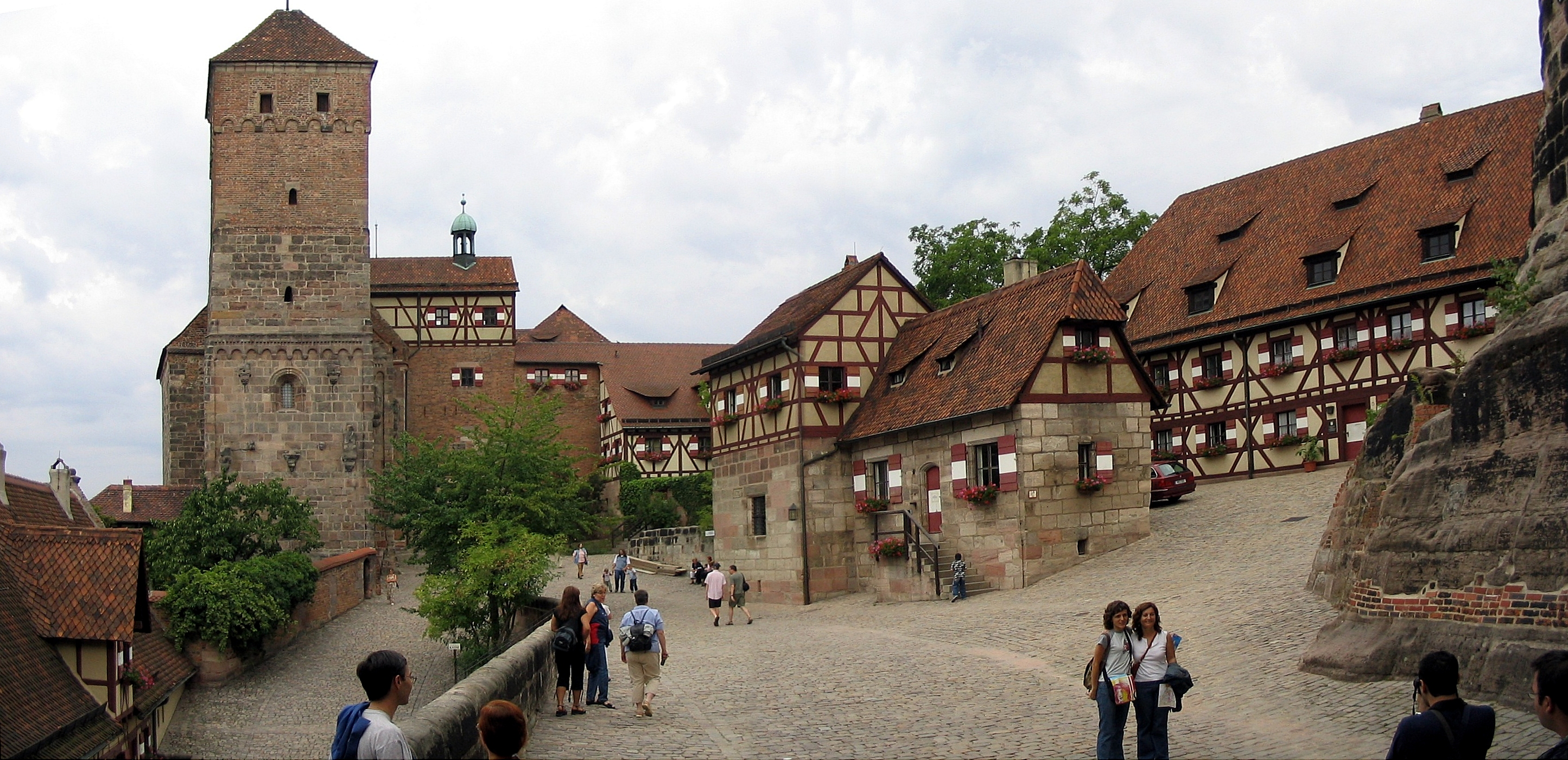
The Imperial Castle

The city and particularly Nuremberg Castle would become one of the most frequent sites of the Imperial Diet (after Regensburg and Frankfurt), the Diets of Nuremberg from 1211 to 1543, after the first Nuremberg diet elected Frederick II as emperor. Because of the many Diets of Nuremberg, the city became an important routine place of the administration of the Holy Roman Empire during this time and a somewhat 'unofficial capital' of the Empire. In 1219 Emperor Frederick II granted the Großen Freiheitsbrief ('Great Charter of Freedom'), including town rights, Imperial immediacy (Reichsfreiheit), the privilege to mint coins, and an independent customs policy – almost wholly removing the city from the purview of the burgraves. Nuremberg soon became, with Augsburg, one of the two great trade-centers on the route from Italy to Northern Europe.

In 1298, the Jews of the town were accused of host desecration and 698 of them were killed in one of the many Rintfleisch massacres. Behind the massacre of 1298 was also the desire to combine the northern and southern parts of the city, which were divided by the Pegnitz. The Jews of the German lands suffered many massacres during the plague pandemic of the mid-14th century.

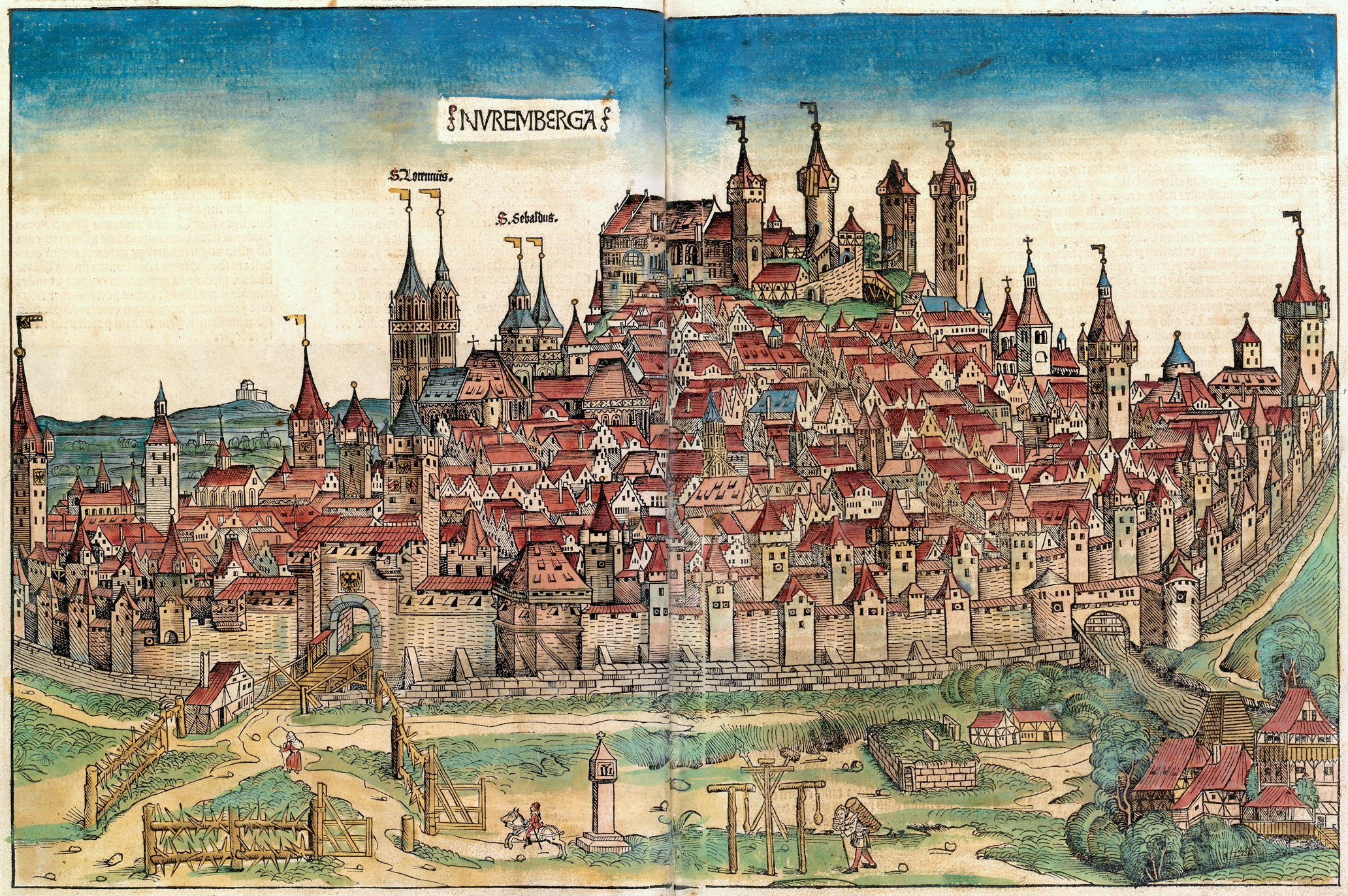
Nuremberg in 1493 (from the Nuremberg Chronicle)

In 1349, Nuremberg's Jews suffered a pogrom. They were burned at the stake or expelled, and a marketplace was built over the former Jewish quarter. The plague returned to the city in 1405, 1435, 1437, 1482, 1494, 1520, and 1534.

The largest growth of Nuremberg occurred in the 14th century. Charles IV's Golden Bull of 1356, naming Nuremberg as the city where newly elected kings of Germany must hold their first Imperial Diet, made Nuremberg one of the three most important cities of the Empire. Charles was the patron of the Frauenkirche, built between 1352 and 1362 (the architect was likely Peter Parler), where the Imperial court worshipped during its stays in Nuremberg. The royal and Imperial connection grew stronger in 1423 when the Holy Roman Emperor Sigismund of Luxembourg granted the Imperial regalia to be kept permanently in Nuremberg, where they remained until 1796, when the advance of French troops required their removal to Regensburg and thence to Vienna.

In 1349 the members of the guilds unsuccessfully rebelled against the patricians in a Handwerkeraufstand ('Craftsmen's Uprising'), supported by merchants and some by councillors, leading to a ban on any self-organisation of the artisans in the city, abolishing the guilds that were customary elsewhere in Europe; the unions were then dissolved, and the oligarchs remained in power while Nuremberg was a free city (until the early-19th century). Charles IV conferred upon the city the right to conclude alliances independently, thereby placing it upon a politically equal footing with the princes of the Empire. Frequent fights took place with the burgraves without, however, inflicting lasting damage upon the city. After fire destroyed the castle in 1420 during a feud between Frederick IV (from 1417, Margrave of Brandenburg) and the duke of Bavaria-Ingolstadt, the city purchased the ruins and the forest belonging to the castle (1427), resulting in the city's total sovereignty within its borders.

Through these and other acquisitions the city accumulated considerable territory. The Hussite Wars (1419–1434), the second Black Death pandemic in 1437, and the First Margrave War (1449–1450) led to a severe fall in population in the mid-15th century. Siding with Albert IV, Duke of Bavaria-Munich, in the War of the Succession of Landshut of 1503–1505, led the city to gain substantial territory, resulting in lands of 25 sq mi (64.7 km^{2}), making it one of the largest imperial cities.

During the Middle Ages, Nuremberg fostered a rich, varied, and influential literary culture.

=== Early modern age ===
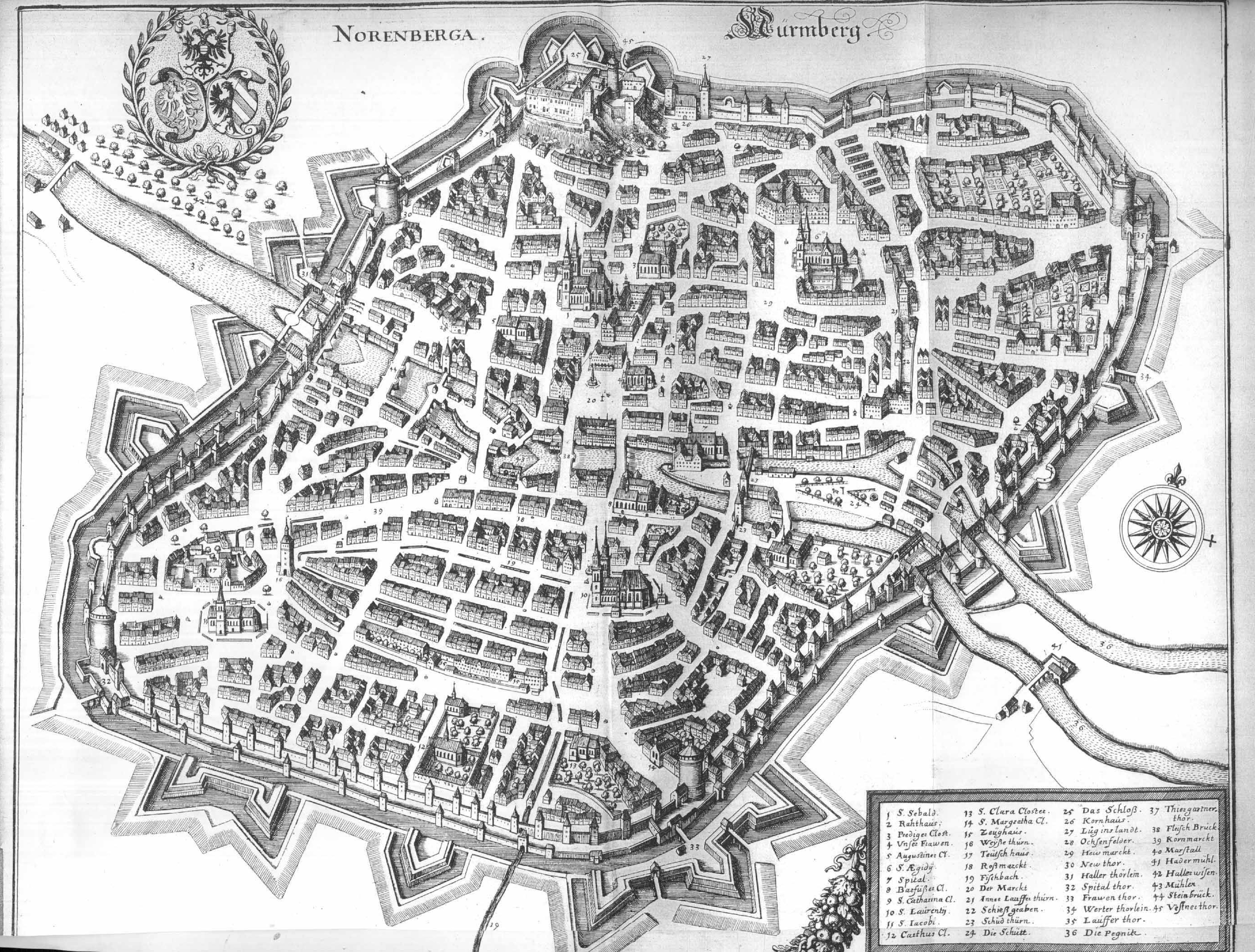
Map of Nuremberg, 1648

The cultural flowering of Nuremberg in the 15th and 16th centuries made it the centre of the German Renaissance. In 1525 Nuremberg accepted the Protestant Reformation, and in 1532 the Nuremberg Religious Peace was signed there, preventing war between Lutherans and Catholics for 15 years. During the Princes' 1552 revolution against Charles V, Nuremberg tried to purchase its neutrality, but Margrave Albert Alcibiades, one of the leaders of the revolt, attacked the city without a declaration of war and dictated a disadvantageous peace. At the 1555 Peace of Augsburg, the possessions of the Protestants were confirmed by the Emperor, their religious privileges extended and their independence from the Bishop of Bamberg affirmed, while the 1520s' secularisation of the monasteries was also approved. Families like the Tucher, Imhoff or Haller ran trading businesses across Europe, similar to the Fugger and Welser families from Augsburg, although on a slightly smaller scale.

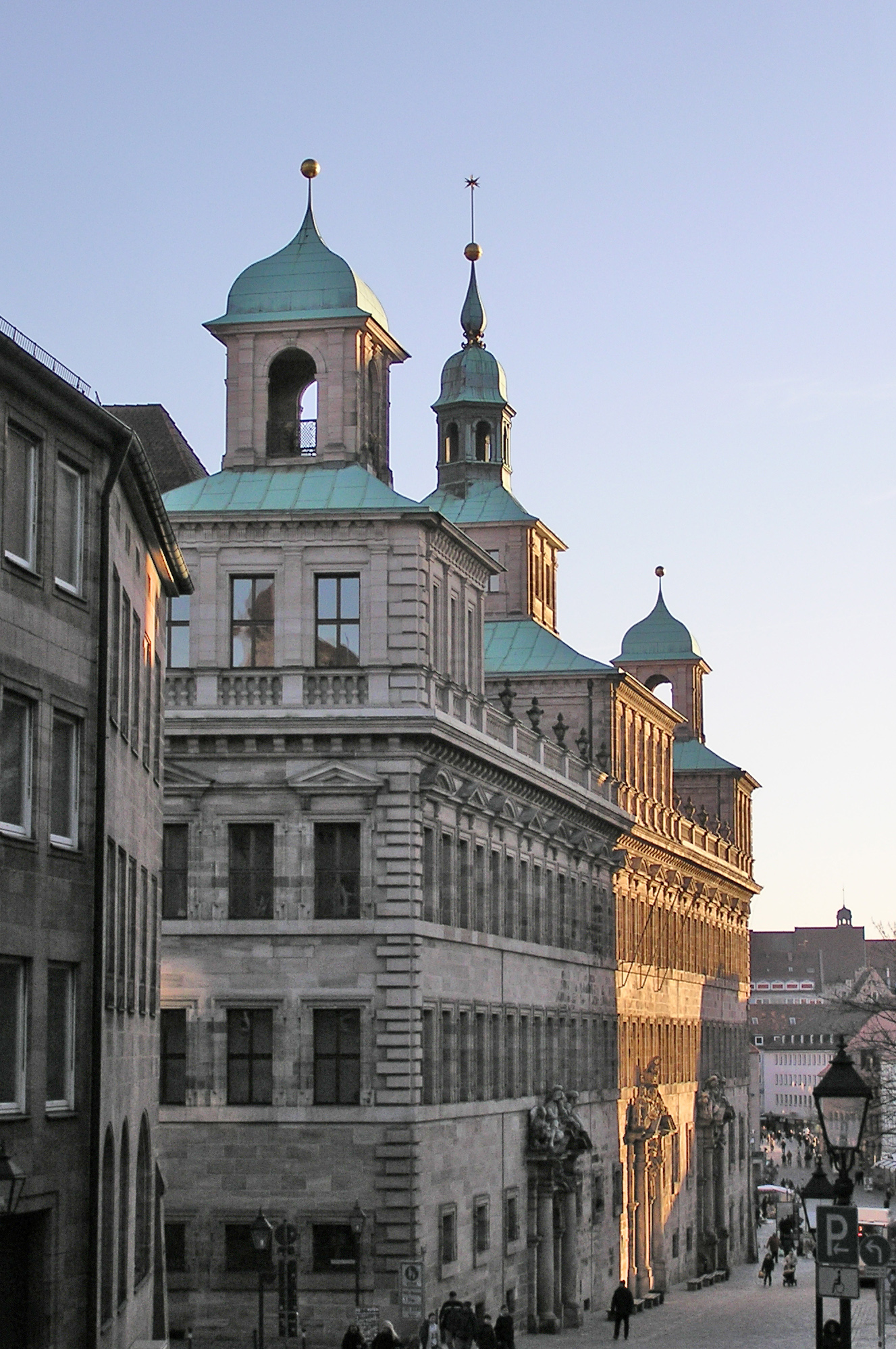
Wolffscher Bau of the old city hall

The state of affairs in the early 16th century, increased trade routes elsewhere and the ossification of the social hierarchy and legal structures contributed to the decline in trade. During the Thirty Years' War, frequent quartering of Imperial, Swedish and League soldiers, the financial costs of the war and the cessation of trade caused irreparable damage to the city and a near-halving of the population. In 1632, the city, occupied by the forces of Gustavus Adolphus of Sweden, was besieged by the army of Imperial general Albrecht von Wallenstein. The city declined after the war and recovered its importance only in the 19th century, when it grew as an industrial centre. Even after the Thirty Years' War, however, there was a late flowering of architecture and culture; secular Baroque architecture is exemplified in the layout of the civic gardens built outside the city walls, and in the Protestant city's rebuilding of St. Egidien church, destroyed by fire at the beginning of the 18th century, considered a significant contribution to the baroque church architecture of Middle Franconia.

After the Thirty Years' War, Nuremberg attempted to remain detached from external affairs, but contributions were demanded for the War of the Austrian Succession and the Seven Years' War and restrictions of imports and exports deprived the city of many markets for its manufactures. The Bavarian elector, Charles Theodore, appropriated part of the land obtained by the city during the Landshut War of Succession, to which Bavaria had maintained its claim; Prussia also claimed part of the territory. Realising its weakness, the city asked to be incorporated into Prussia but Frederick William II refused, fearing to offend Austria, Russia and France. At the Imperial diet in 1803, the independence of Nuremberg was affirmed, but on the signing of the Confederation of the Rhine on 12 July 1806, it was agreed to hand the city over to Bavaria from 8 September, with Bavaria guaranteeing the amortisation of the city's 12.5 million guilder public debt.

=== After the Napoleonic Wars ===
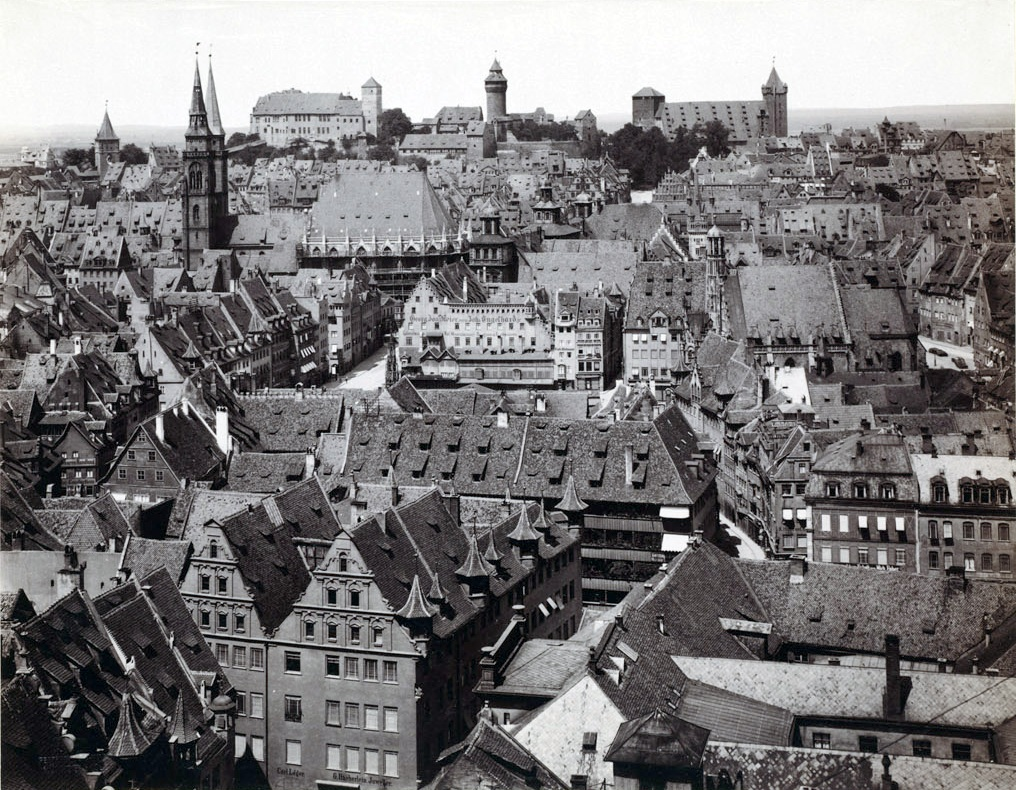
Old town of Nuremberg in the 19th century

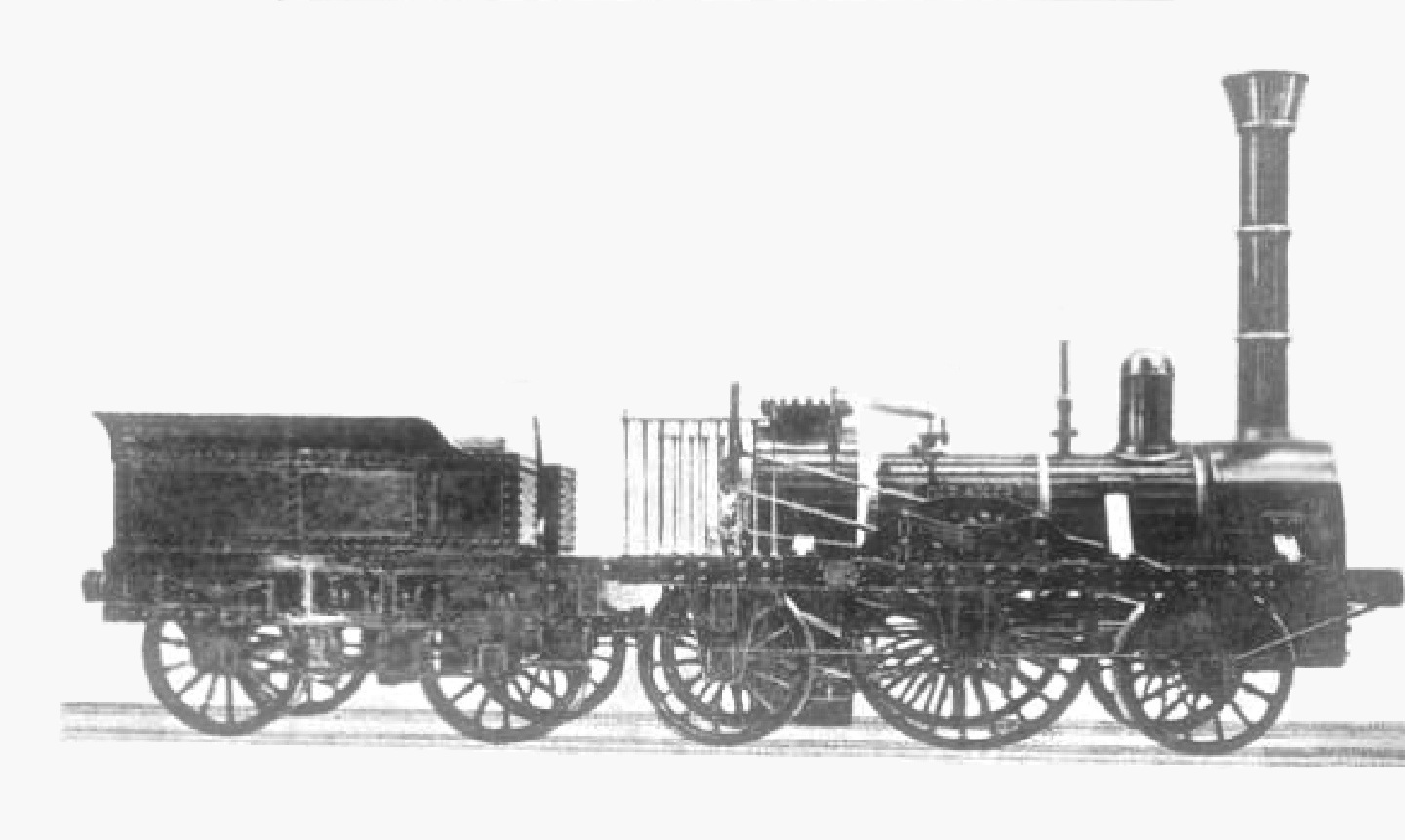
The British-built Adler was the locomotive of the first German Railway between Nuremberg and Fürth.

After the fall of Napoleon, the city's trade and commerce revived; the skill of its inhabitants together with its favourable situation soon made the city prosperous, particularly after its public debt had been acknowledged as a part of the Bavarian national debt. Having been incorporated into a Catholic country, the city was compelled to refrain from further discrimination against Catholics, who had been excluded from the rights of citizenship. Catholic services had been celebrated in the city by the priests of the Teutonic Order, often under great difficulties. After their possessions had been confiscated by the Bavarian government in 1806, they were given the Frauenkirche on the Market in 1809; in 1810 the first Catholic parish was established, which in 1818 numbered 1,010 people.

In 1817, the city was incorporated into the district of Rezatkreis (named for the river Franconian Rezat), which was renamed to Middle Franconia (German: Mittelfranken) on 1 January 1838. The first German railway, the Bavarian Ludwigsbahn, from Nuremberg to nearby Fürth, was opened in 1835. The establishment of railways and the incorporation of Bavaria into Zollverein (the 19th-century German Customs Union), commerce and industry opened the way to greater prosperity. In 1852, there were 53,638 inhabitants: 46,441 Protestants and 6,616 Catholics. It subsequently grew to become the more important industrial city of Southern Germany, one of the most prosperous towns of southern Germany, but after the Austro-Prussian War it was given to Prussia as part of their telegraph stations they had to give up. In 1905, its population, including several incorporated suburbs, was 291,351: 86,943 Catholics, 196,913 Protestants, 3,738 Jews and 3,766 members of other religions. The Fränkischer Kurier was published as a local newspaper in Nuremberg.

=== Nazi era ===
Nuremberg held great significance during the Nazi German era. Because of the city's relevance to the Holy Roman Empire and its position in the centre of Germany, the Nazi Party chose the city to be the site of huge Nazi Party conventions: the Nuremberg rallies. The rallies were held in 1927, 1929 and annually from 1933 through 1938. A number of buildings and large gathering areas known collectively as the Nazi Party Rally Grounds, some of which were not finished, were designed by Albert Speer and were constructed solely for these assemblies. After Adolf Hitler's rise to power in 1933 the Nuremberg rallies became huge Nazi propaganda events, a centre of Nazi ideals. The 1934 rally was filmed by Leni Riefenstahl, and made into a propaganda film called Triumph des Willens (Triumph of the Will). At the 1935 rally, Hitler specifically ordered the Reichstag to convene at Nuremberg to pass the Nuremberg Laws which revoked German citizenship for all Jews and other non-Aryans.

The Nazi Oberbürgermeister of the city, Willy Liebel, embarked upon a program of urban architectural renewal that he felt befitted one of the centers of Nazi pageantry. The aim was to restore the city center to the medieval look of centuries past by eliminating late nineteenth-century styling. Among the buildings he slated for demolition was the Grand Synagogue of Nuremberg. He felt that this "foreign" building with its Moorish revival architecture could not be reconciled with the image that he strove to create, and he succeeded in having the building completely demolished around the time of the Party rally in September 1938. Many examples of Nazi architecture can still be seen in the city.

The city was also the headquarters of the Nazi propagandist Julius Streicher, the Nazi Party Gauleiter of Franconia, a vicious antisemite and the publisher of Der Stürmer. During the anti-Jewish pogrom known as Kristallnacht on 10 November 1938, the two remaining synagogues and numerous Jewish-owned shops were burned to the ground. Of the 91 Jews in Germany who met their deaths as a result of Kristallnacht, 26 (including ten suicides) were in Nuremberg. Between 2,000 and 3,000 of Nuremberg's Jews fled from Germany. By 1941, only about 1,800 remained, over 1,600 of whom were rounded-up and transported to various extermination camps where they were killed. At the end of the war in 1945, there were no Jews left in Nuremberg. There are many Stolpersteine installed in the streets of the city; these commemorate Jews who were persecuted by the Nazi regime.

During the Second World War, Nuremberg was the headquarters of Wehrkreis (military district) XIII, and an important site for military production, including aircraft, submarines, and tank engines. A subcamp of Flossenbürg concentration camp was located here, and extensively used slave labour.

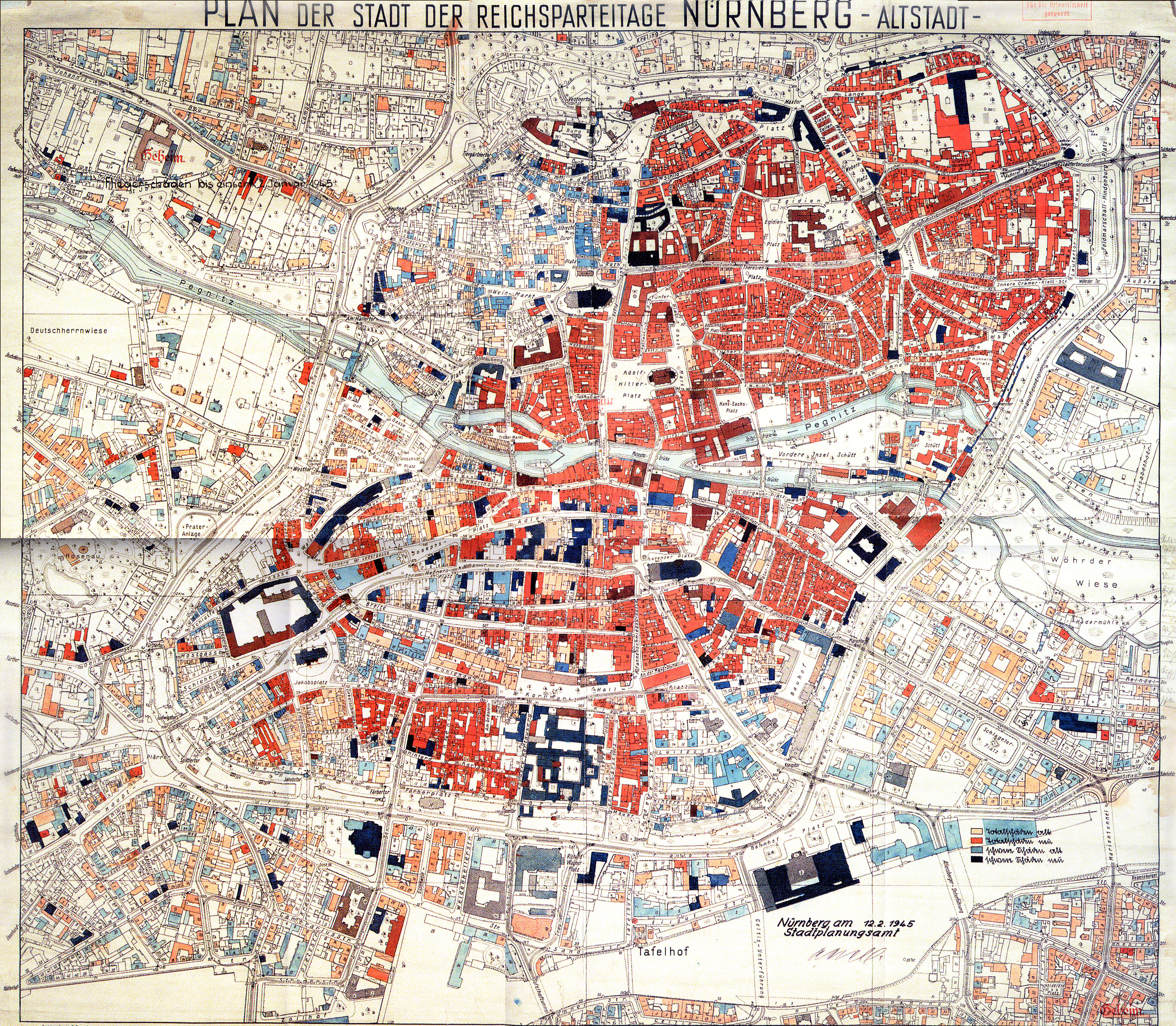
Map of city centre with air raid destruction

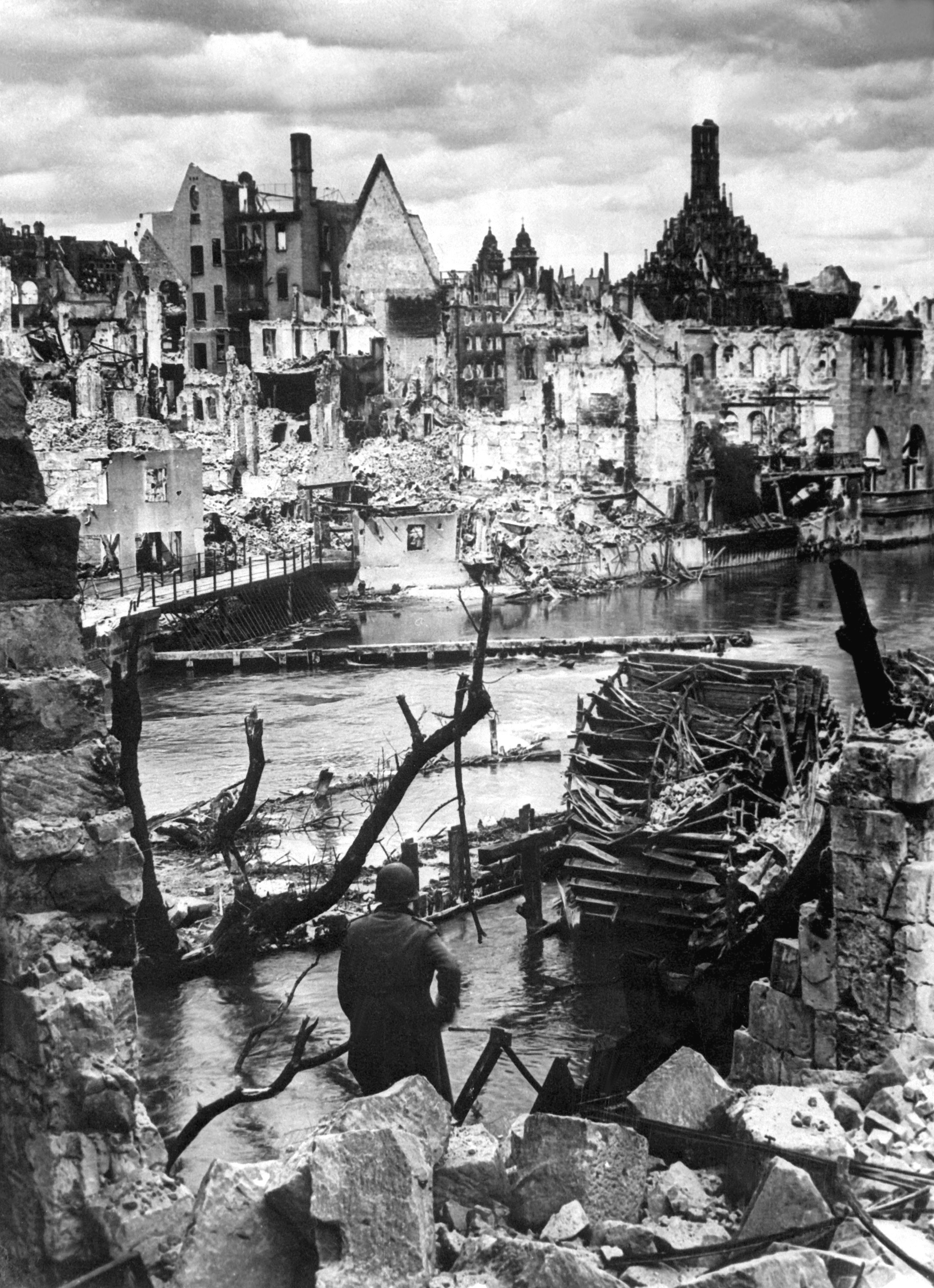
Bombed-out Nuremberg, 1945

On 2 January 1945, the medieval city centre was systematically bombed by the Royal Air Force and the U.S. Army Air Forces and about eighty percent of it was destroyed in only one hour, with 1,800 residents killed and roughly 100,000 displaced. In February 1945, additional attacks followed. In total, about 6,000 Nuremberg residents are estimated to have been killed in air raids.

Nuremberg was a heavily fortified city that was captured in a fierce battle lasting from 17 to 20 April 1945 by the U.S. 3rd Infantry Division, 42nd Infantry Division and 45th Infantry Division, which fought house-to-house and street-by-street against determined German resistance, causing further urban devastation to the already bombed and shelled buildings. Despite this intense degree of destruction, the city was rebuilt after the war and was to some extent restored to its pre-war appearance, including the reconstruction of many of its medieval buildings. Much of this reconstructive work and conservation was done by the organisation 'Old Town Friends Nuremberg'. Today 25% of Nürnberg's buildings date to before World War II and the old town is a declared protected area, so the northeastern half of the old Imperial Free City had to be largely reconstructed.

=== Nuremberg trials ===
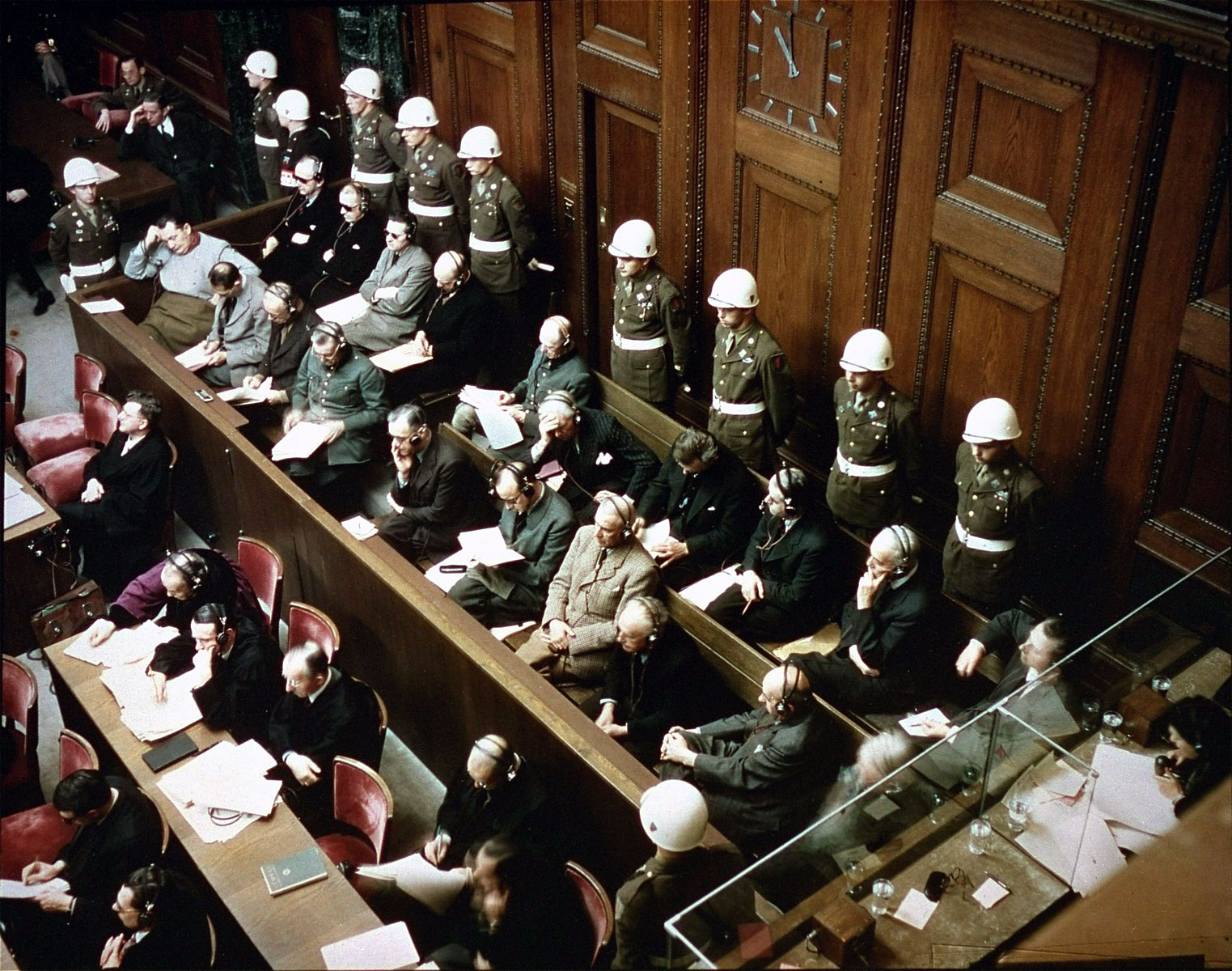
Defendants in the dock at the Nuremberg trials

Between 1945 and 1946, German officials involved in war crimes and crimes against humanity were brought before an international tribunal in the Nuremberg trials. The Soviet Union had wanted these trials to take place in Berlin. However, Nuremberg was chosen as the site for the trials for specific reasons:

- The city had been the location of the Nazi Party's Nuremberg rallies and the laws stripping Jews of their citizenship were passed there. There was symbolic value in making it the place of Nazi accountability.
- The Palace of Justice was spacious and largely undamaged (one of the few that had remained largely intact despite extensive Allied bombing of Germany). The already large courtroom was reasonably easily expanded by the removal of the wall at the end opposite the bench, thereby incorporating the adjoining room. A large prison was also part of the complex.

As a compromise, it was agreed that Berlin would become the permanent seat of the International Military Tribunal and that the first trial (several were planned) would take place in Nuremberg. Due to the Cold War, subsequent trials never took place.

Following the trials, in October 1946, many prominent German Nazi politicians and military leaders were executed in Nuremberg.

The same courtroom in Nuremberg was the venue of the Nuremberg Military Tribunals, organized by the United States as occupying power in the area.

In order to come to terms with the role Nuremberg played during the Third Reich, the city established the Nuremberg International Human Rights Award in 1995, awarded every two years to individuals or groups defending human rights worldwide.

== Geography ==
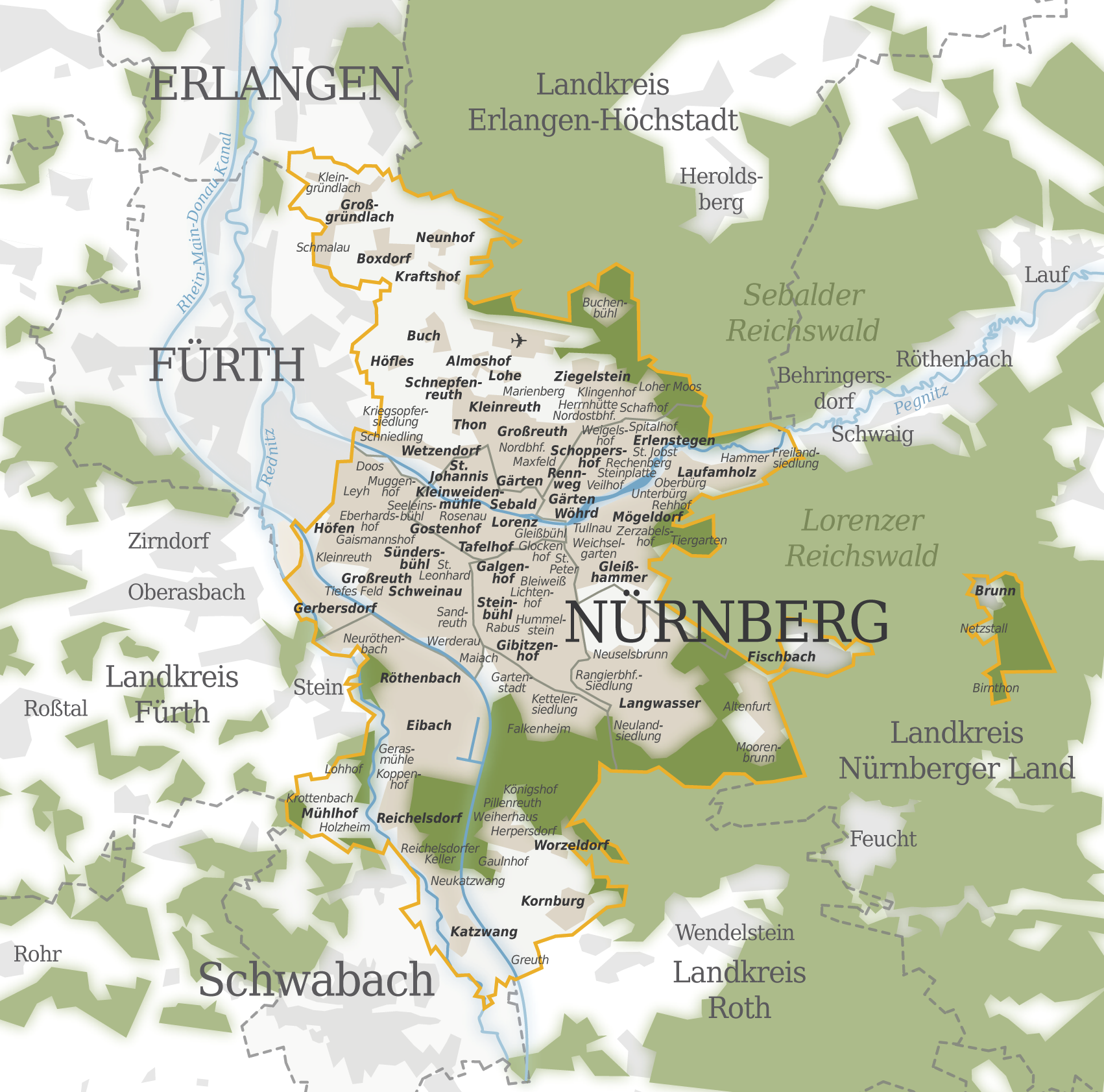
Map of Nuremberg

Several old villages now belong to the city, for example Grossgründlach, Kraftshof, Thon, and Neunhof in the north-west; Ziegelstein in the northeast, Altenfurt and Fischbach in the south-east; and Katzwang, Kornburg in the south. Langwasser is a modern suburb.

=== Climate ===
Nuremberg has an oceanic climate (Köppen Cfb) with a certain humid continental influence (Dfb), categorized in the latter by the 0 °C isotherm. The city's climate is influenced by its inland position and higher altitude. Winters are changeable, with either mild or cold weather: the average temperature is around −3 °C (27 °F) to 4 °C (39 °F), while summers are generally warm, mostly around 13 °C (55 °F) at night to 25 °C (77 °F) in the afternoon. Precipitation is evenly spread throughout the year, although February and April tend to be a bit drier whereas July tends to have more rainfall.

Climate data for Nuremberg (1991–2020 normals, extremes since 1955)
Month	Jan	Feb	Mar	Apr	May	Jun	Jul	Aug	Sep	Oct	Nov	Dec	Year
Record high °C (°F)	15.0 (59.0)	19.3 (66.7)	24.4 (75.9)	31.0 (87.8)	32.7 (90.9)	36.2 (97.2)	38.6 (101.5)	37.6 (99.7)	32.3 (90.1)	29.6 (85.3)	20.4 (68.7)	16.5 (61.7)	38.6 (101.5)
Mean maximum °C (°F)	11.0 (51.8)	13.2 (55.8)	18.9 (66.0)	24.3 (75.7)	28.5 (83.3)	32.1 (89.8)	33.3 (91.9)	32.8 (91.0)	27.6 (81.7)	22.7 (72.9)	16.2 (61.2)	11.5 (52.7)	34.7 (94.5)
Mean daily maximum °C (°F)	3.5 (38.3)	5.3 (41.5)	10.0 (50.0)	15.4 (59.7)	19.7 (67.5)	23.2 (73.8)	25.1 (77.2)	24.9 (76.8)	19.9 (67.8)	14.1 (57.4)	7.8 (46.0)	4.1 (39.4)	14.4 (57.9)
Daily mean °C (°F)	0.7 (33.3)	1.5 (34.7)	5.1 (41.2)	9.7 (49.5)	14.1 (57.4)	17.5 (63.5)	19.4 (66.9)	18.9 (66.0)	14.2 (57.6)	9.4 (48.9)	4.7 (40.5)	1.5 (34.7)	9.7 (49.5)
Mean daily minimum °C (°F)	−2.5 (27.5)	−2.3 (27.9)	0.4 (32.7)	3.5 (38.3)	7.8 (46.0)	11.4 (52.5)	13.3 (55.9)	12.8 (55.0)	8.8 (47.8)	5.1 (41.2)	1.5 (34.7)	−1.3 (29.7)	4.9 (40.8)
Mean minimum °C (°F)	−11.6 (11.1)	−10.2 (13.6)	−6.3 (20.7)	−3.3 (26.1)	0.8 (33.4)	5.3 (41.5)	7.0 (44.6)	6.7 (44.1)	2.6 (36.7)	−1.6 (29.1)	−5.8 (21.6)	−10.2 (13.6)	−14.5 (5.9)
Record low °C (°F)	−25.4 (−13.7)	−30.2 (−22.4)	−18.3 (−0.9)	−9.2 (15.4)	−4.3 (24.3)	0.0 (32.0)	3.1 (37.6)	0.6 (33.1)	−2.7 (27.1)	−7.3 (18.9)	−12.7 (9.1)	−23.0 (−9.4)	−30.2 (−22.4)
Average precipitation mm (inches)	40.0 (1.57)	32.8 (1.29)	39.1 (1.54)	32.9 (1.30)	61.3 (2.41)	64.0 (2.52)	76.7 (3.02)	59.5 (2.34)	48.9 (1.93)	49.4 (1.94)	47.1 (1.85)	48.8 (1.92)	600.5 (23.64)
Average precipitation days (≥ 1.0 mm)	15.0	13.4	13.6	12.2	13.6	13.2	14.7	12.4	11.7	13.8	14.4	17.1	165.2
Average snowy days (≥ 1.0 cm)	4.6	2.7	0.7	0	0	0	0	0	0	0	0.2	2.4	10.6
Average relative humidity (%)	83.9	79.8	74.0	66.7	67.4	67.4	66.9	69.3	76.3	82.8	86.3	86.6	75.6
Mean monthly sunshine hours	58.6	85.4	129.7	186.7	218.6	228.6	239.2	225.5	165.2	113.7	57.9	44.0	1,753.1
Source 1: World Meteorological Organization
Source 2: DWD Météo Climat Infoclimat

== Culture ==
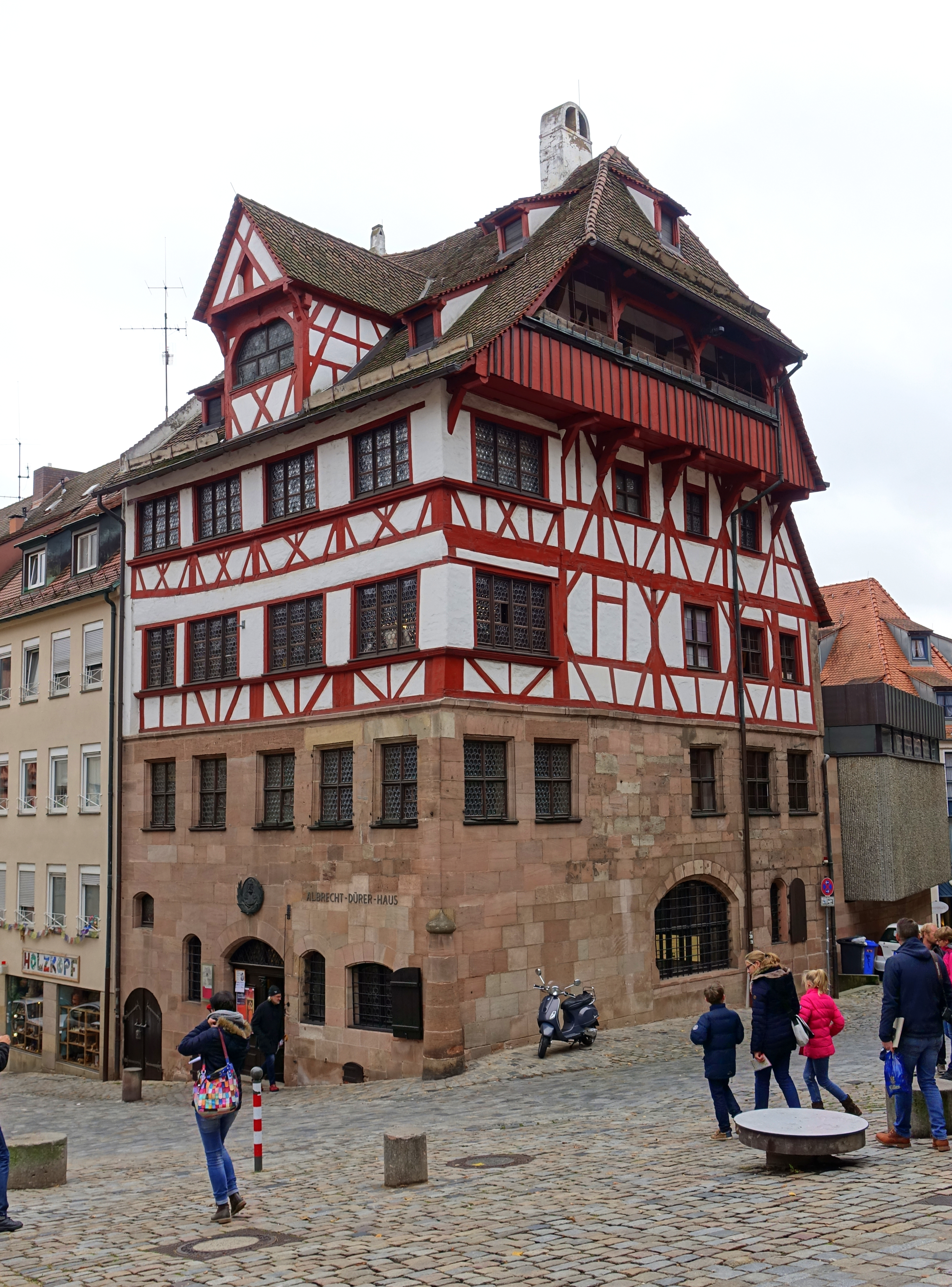
Albrecht Dürer's House

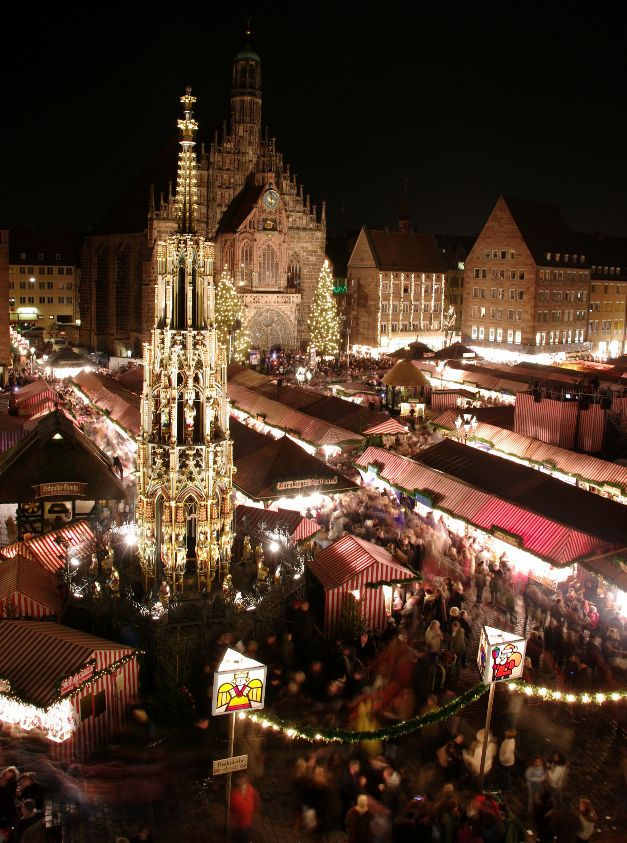
Christkindlesmarkt with Schöner Brunnen

Nuremberg was an early centre of humanism, science, printing, and mechanical invention. The city contributed much to the science of astronomy. In 1471 Johannes Mueller of Königsberg (Bavaria), later called Regiomontanus, built an astronomical observatory in Nuremberg and published many important astronomical charts.

In 1515, Albrecht Dürer, a native of Nuremberg, created woodcuts of the first maps of the stars of the northern and southern hemispheres, producing the first printed star charts, which had been ordered by Johannes Stabius. Around 1515 Dürer also published the "Stabiussche Weltkarte", the first perspective drawing of the terrestrial globe.

Printers and publishers have a long history in Nuremberg. Many of these publishers worked with well-known artists of the day to produce books that could also be considered works of art. In 1470 Anton Koberger opened Europe's first print shop in Nuremberg. In 1493, he published the Nuremberg Chronicles, also known as the World Chronicles (Schedelsche Weltchronik), an illustrated history of the world from the creation to the present day. It was written in the local Franconian dialect by Hartmann Schedel and had illustrations by Michael Wohlgemuth, Wilhelm Pleydenwurff, and Albrecht Dürer. Others furthered geographical knowledge and travel by map making. Notable among these was navigator and geographer Martin Behaim, who made the first world globe.

Sculptors such as Veit Stoss, Adam Kraft and Peter Vischer are also associated with Nuremberg.

Composed of prosperous artisans, the guilds of the Meistersingers flourished here. Richard Wagner made their most famous member, Hans Sachs, the hero of his opera Die Meistersinger von Nürnberg. Baroque composer Johann Pachelbel was born here and was organist of St. Sebaldus Church.

The academy of fine arts situated in Nuremberg is the oldest art academy in central Europe and looks back to a tradition of 350 years of artistic education.

Nuremberg is also famous for its Christkindlesmarkt (Christmas market), which draws well over a million shoppers each year. The market is famous for its handmade ornaments and delicacies.

=== Museums ===
There are 54 different museums for arts and culture, history, science and technology, family and children, and more niche categories, including:

- Germanisches Nationalmuseum
- House of Albrecht Dürer
- Kunsthalle Nürnberg
- Kunstverein Nürnberg
- Neues Museum Nürnberg (Modern Art Museum)
- Nuremberg Toy Museum
- Nuremberg Transport Museum

=== Performing arts ===
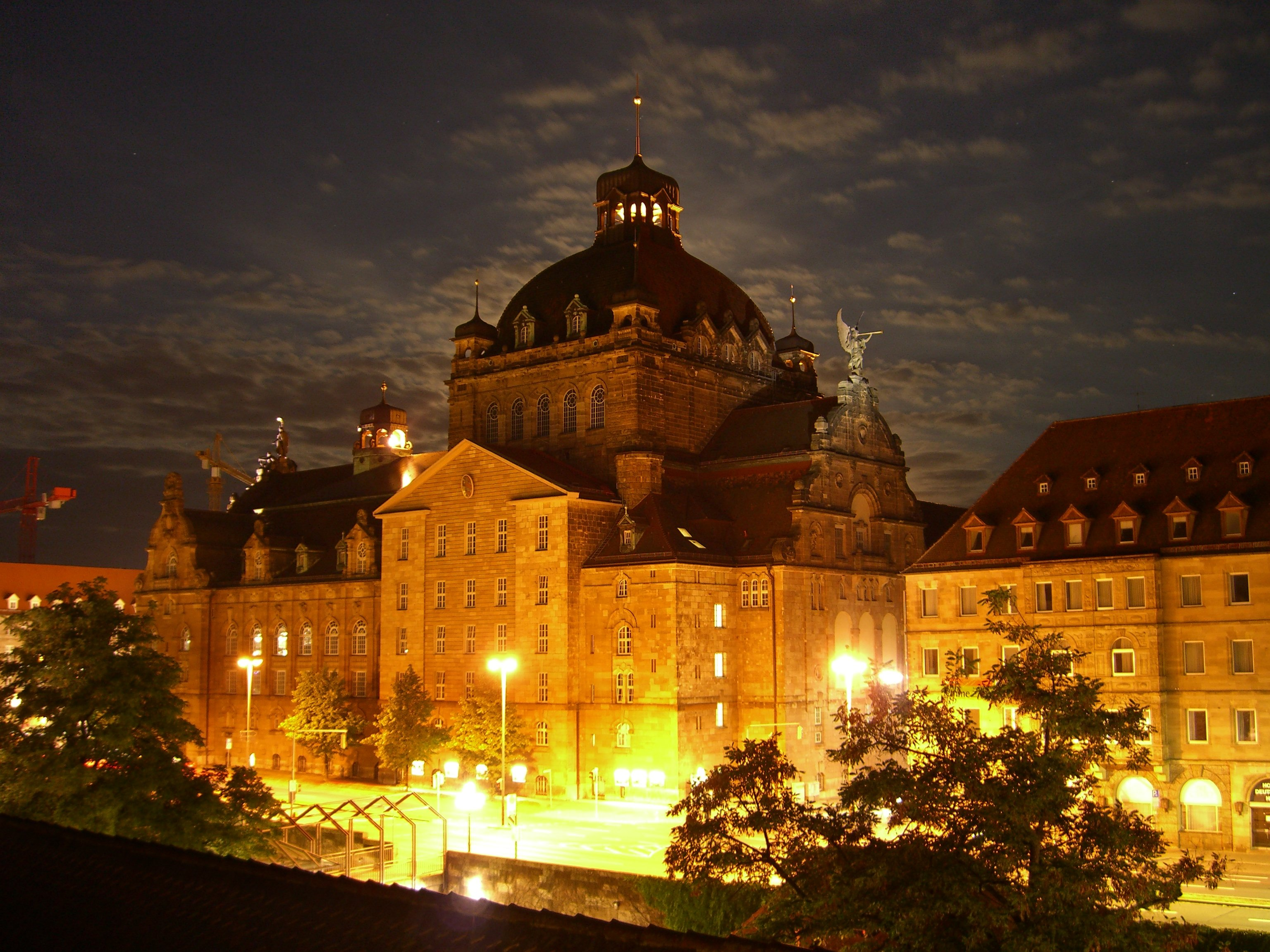
The Nuremberg State Theatre

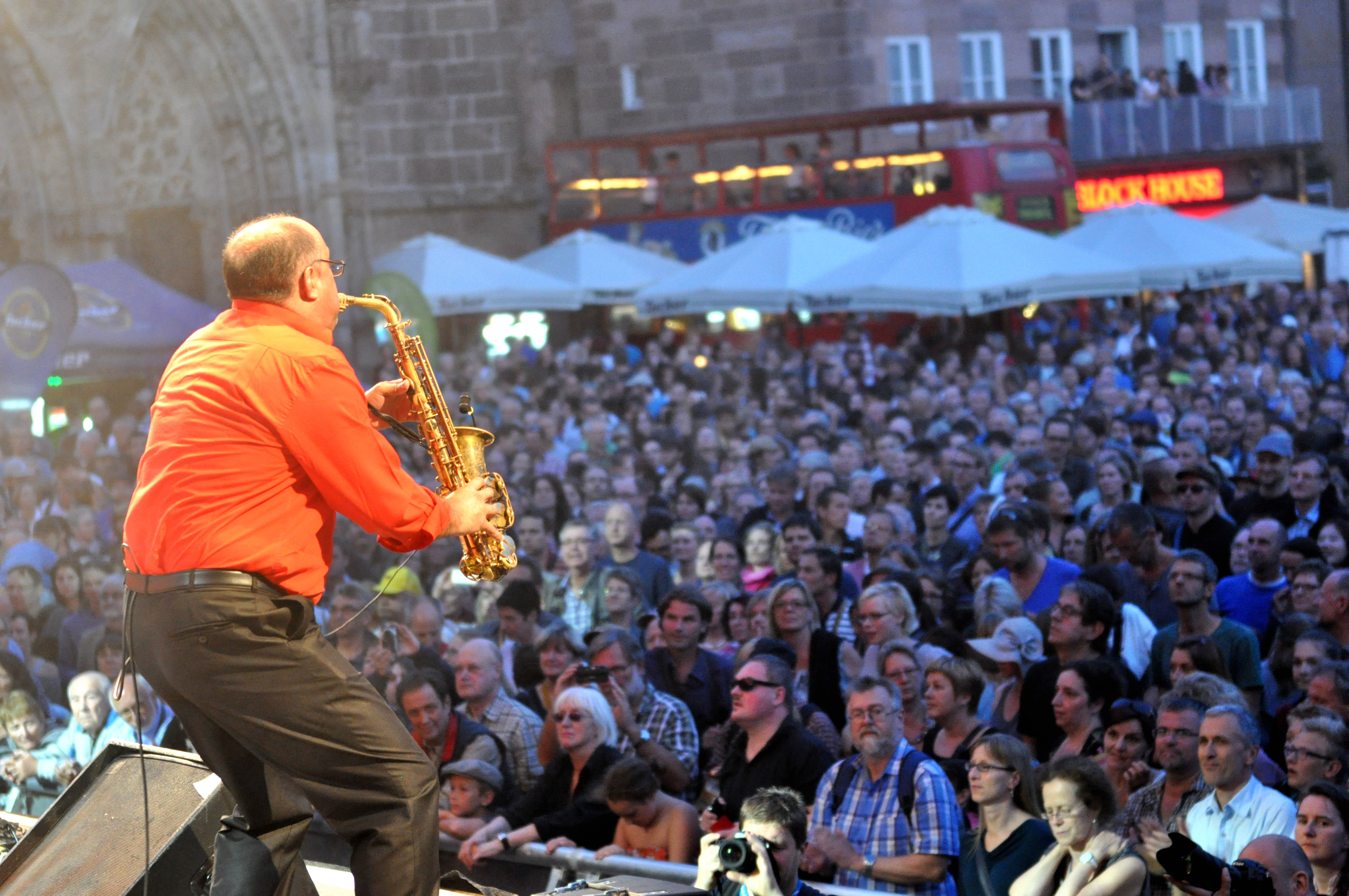
Bardentreffen 2015

The Nuremberg State Theatre, founded in 1906, is dedicated to all types of opera, ballet and stage theatre. During the season 2009/2010, the theatre presented 651 performances for an audience of 240,000 persons. The State Philharmonic Nuremberg (Staatsphilharmonie Nürnberg) is the orchestra of the State Theatre. Its name was changed in 2011 from its previous name: The Nuremberg Philharmonic (Nürnberger Philharmoniker). It is the second-largest opera orchestra in Bavaria. Besides opera performances, it also presents its own subscription concert series in the Meistersingerhalle. Christof Perick was the principal conductor of the orchestra between 2006 and 2011. Marcus Bosch heads the orchestra since September 2011.

The Nuremberg Symphony Orchestra (Nürnberger Symphoniker) performs around 100 concerts a year to a combined annual audience of more than 180,000. The regular subscription concert series are mostly performed in the Meistersingerhalle but other venues are used as well, including the new concert hall of the Kongresshalle and the Serenadenhof. Alexander Shelley has been the principal conductor of the orchestra since 2009.

The Nuremberg International Chamber Music Festival (Internationales Kammermusikfestival Nürnberg) takes place in early September each year, and in 2011 celebrated its tenth anniversary. Concerts take place around the city; opening and closing events are held in the medieval Burg. The Bardentreffen, an annual folk festival in Nuremberg, has been deemed the largest world music festival in Germany and takes place since 1976. 2014 the Bardentreffen starred 368 artists from 31 nations.

=== Cuisine ===
Nuremberg is known for Nürnberger Rostbratwurst, which is shorter and thinner than other bratwurst sausages. Another Nuremberg speciality is Nürnberger Lebkuchen, a kind of gingerbread eaten mainly around Christmas time. There are restaurants for all tastes, including traditional Franconian restaurants and beer gardens. It also has vegan, vegetarian and organic restaurants. Nuremberg boasts a two Michelin Star-rated restaurant, Essigbrätlein.

== Cityscape ==
=== Main sights ===
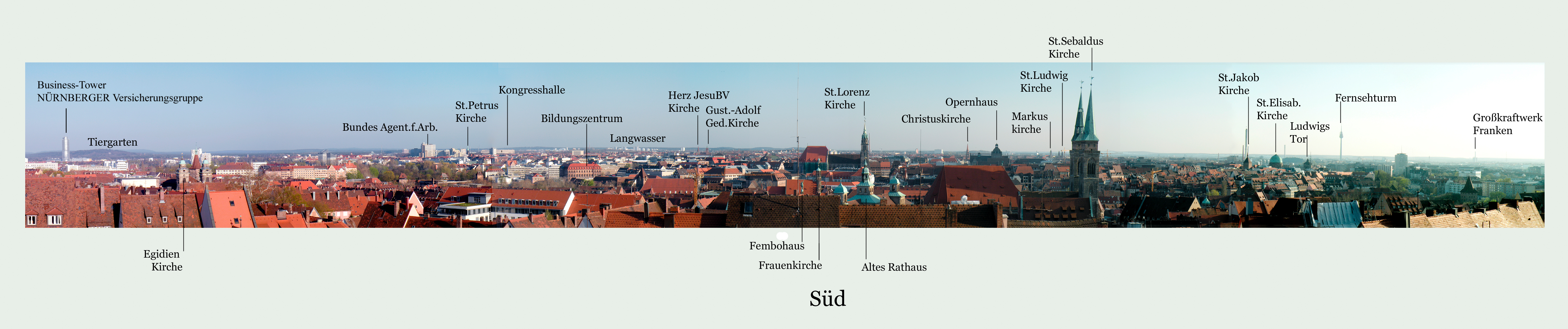
Nuremberg, seen from the castle
- Nuremberg Castle: the three castles that tower over the city including central burgraves' castle, with Free Reich's buildings to the east, the Imperial castle to the west.
- Heilig-Geist-Spital. In the centre of the city, on the bank of the river Pegnitz, stands the Hospital of the Holy Spirit. Founded in 1332, this is one of the largest hospitals of the Middle Ages. Lepers were kept here at some distance from the other patients. It now houses elderly persons and a restaurant.
- The Hauptmarkt, dominated by the front of the unique Gothic Frauenkirche (Our Lady's Church), provides a picturesque setting for the famous Christmas market. A main attraction on the square is the Gothic Schöner Brunnen (Beautiful Fountain) which was erected around 1385 but subsequently replaced with a replica (the original fountain is kept in the Germanisches Nationalmuseum). The unchanged Renaissance bridge Fleischbrücke crosses the Pegnitz nearby.
- The Gothic Lorenzkirche (St. Laurence church) dominates the southern part of the walled city and is one of the most important buildings in Nuremberg. The main body was built around 1270–1350.
- The even earlier and equally impressive Sebalduskirche is St. Lorenz's counterpart in the northern part of the old city.
- The church of the former Katharinenkloster is preserved as a ruin, the charterhouse (Kartause) is integrated into the building of the Germanisches Nationalmuseum and the choir of the former Franziskanerkirche is part of a modern building.
- Other churches located inside the city walls are: St. Laurence's, Saint Clare's, Saint Martha's, Saint James the Greater's, Saint Giles's, and Saint Elisabeth's.
- The Germanisches Nationalmuseum is Germany's largest museum of cultural history, among its exhibits are works of famous painters such as Albrecht Dürer, Rembrandt, and Ernst Ludwig Kirchner.
- The Neues Museum Nürnberg is a museum for modern and contemporary art.
- The Walburga Chapel and the Romanesque Doppelkapelle (Chapel with two floors) are part of Nuremberg Castle.
- The Johannisfriedhof is a medieval cemetery, containing many old graves (Albrecht Dürer, Willibald Pirckheimer, and others). The Rochusfriedhof or the Wöhrder Kirchhof are near the Old Town.
- The Chain Bridge (Kettensteg), the first chain bridge on the European continent.
- The Tiergarten Nürnberg is a zoo stretching over more than 60 hectares (148 acres) in the Nuremberg Reichswald (or Nürnberger Reichswald) forest.
- There is also a medieval market just inside the city walls, selling handcrafted goods.
- The German National Railways Museum (in German) (an Anchor Point of ERIH, The European Route of Industrial Heritage) is located in Nuremberg.
- The Nuremberg Ring (now welded within an iron fence of Schöner Brunnen) is said to bring good luck to those that spin it.
- The Nazi party rally grounds with the documentation-center.
Popular places in Nuremberg

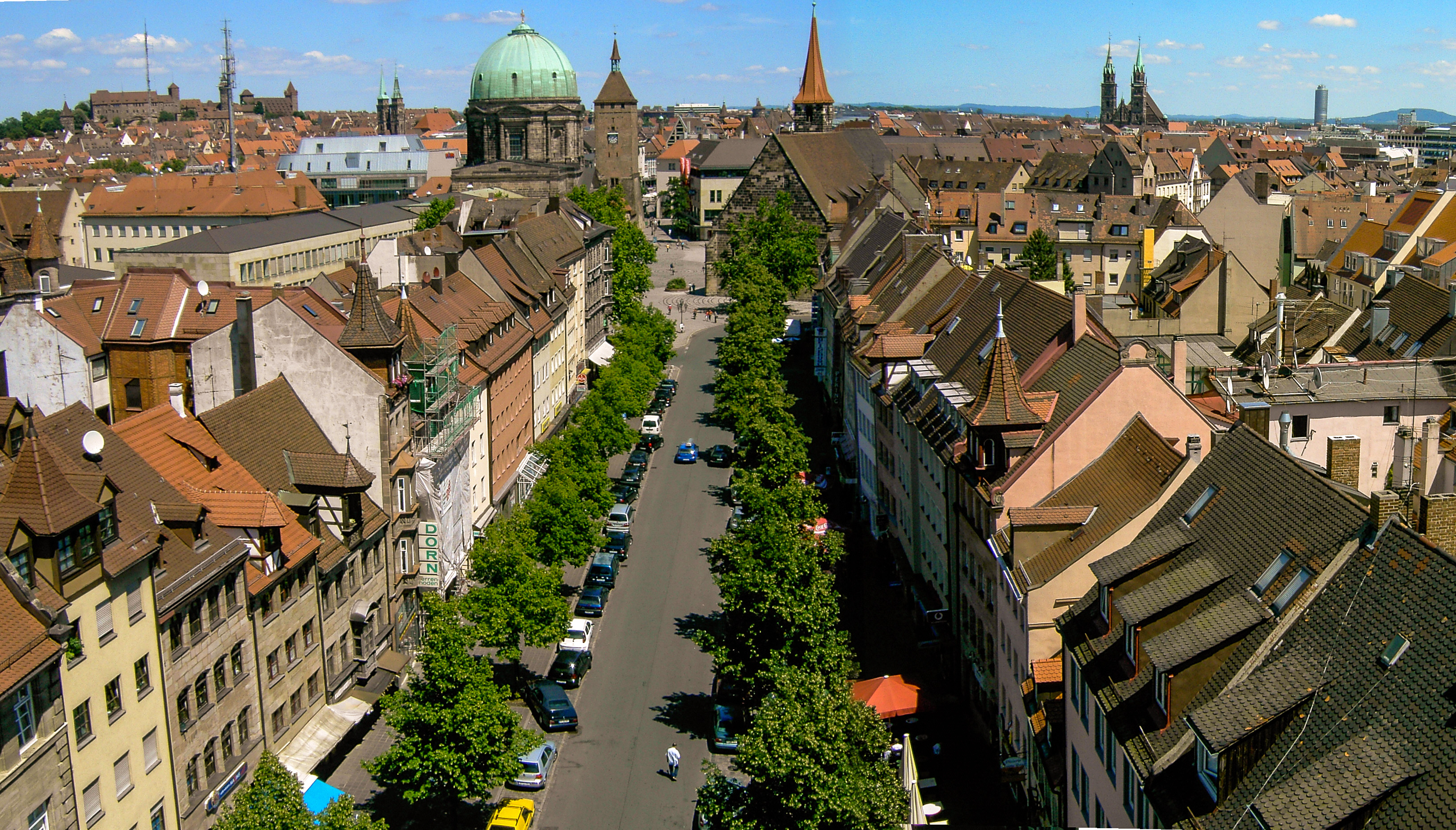
Nuremberg from Spittlertor

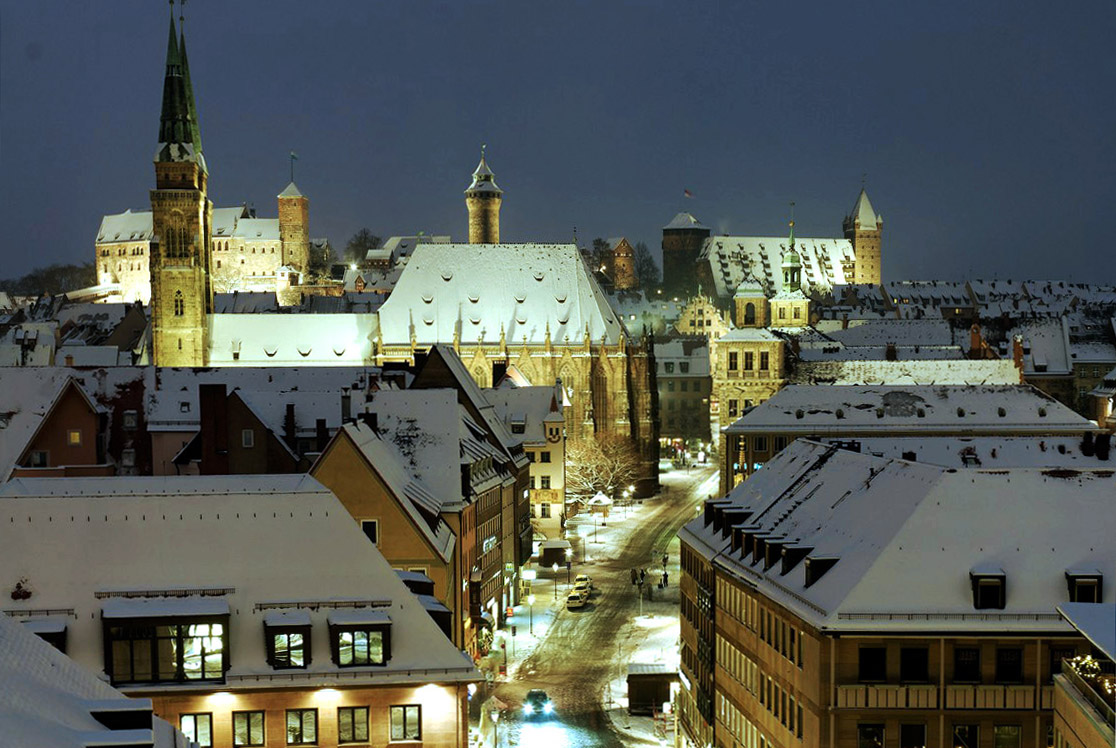
St. Sebaldus Church and Nuremberg Castle in winter

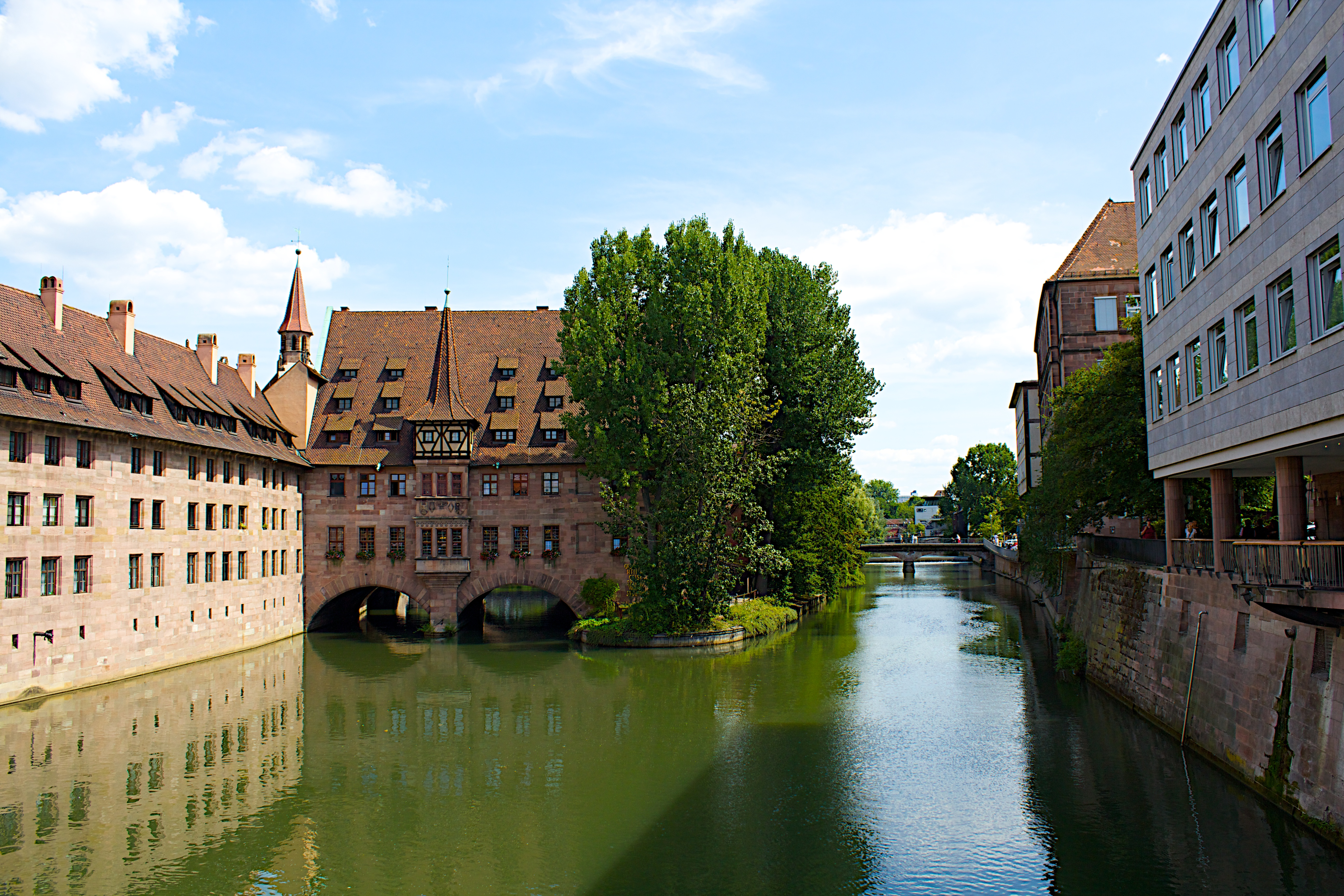
Heilig-Geist-Spital
(Hospice of the Holy Spirit)

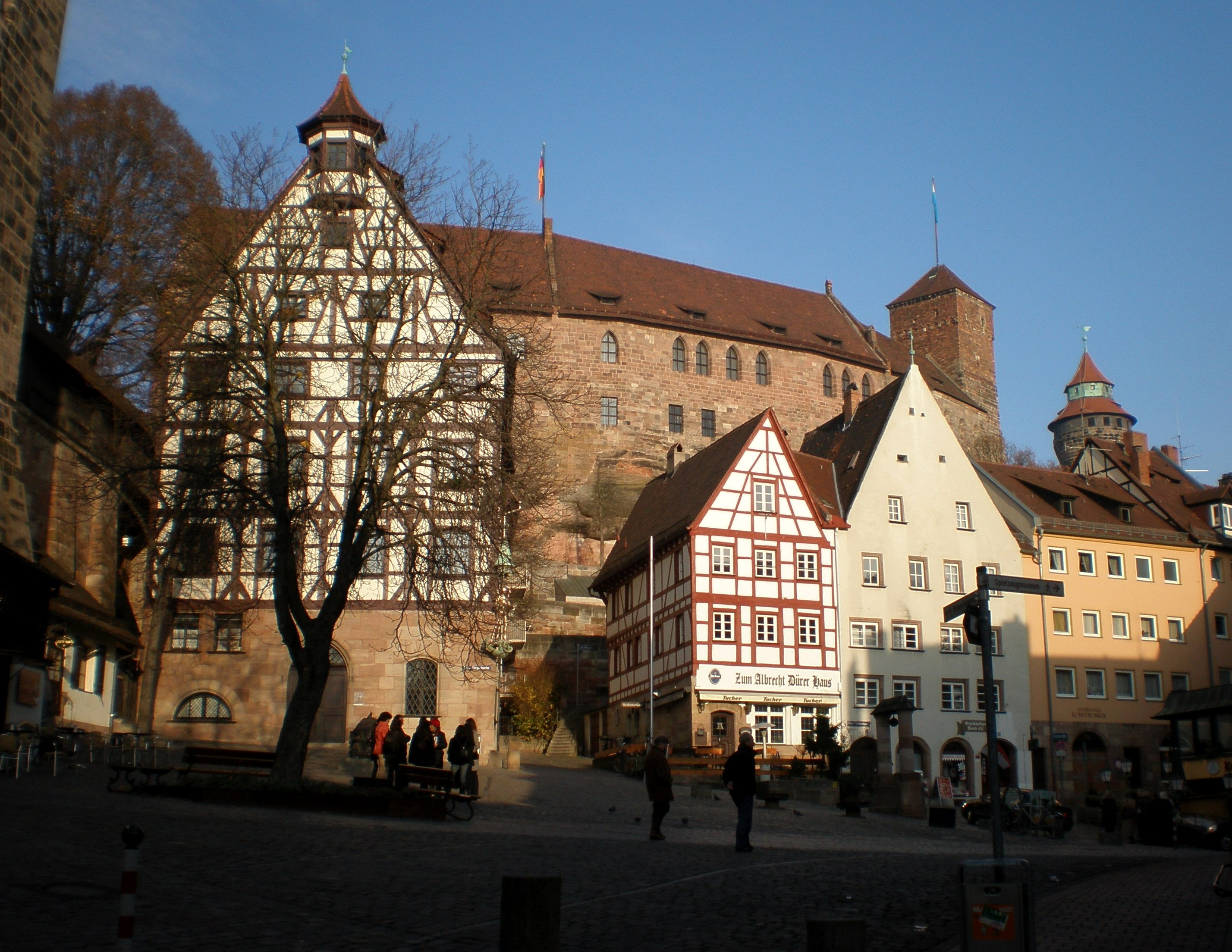
Pilatushaus and Nuremberg Castle

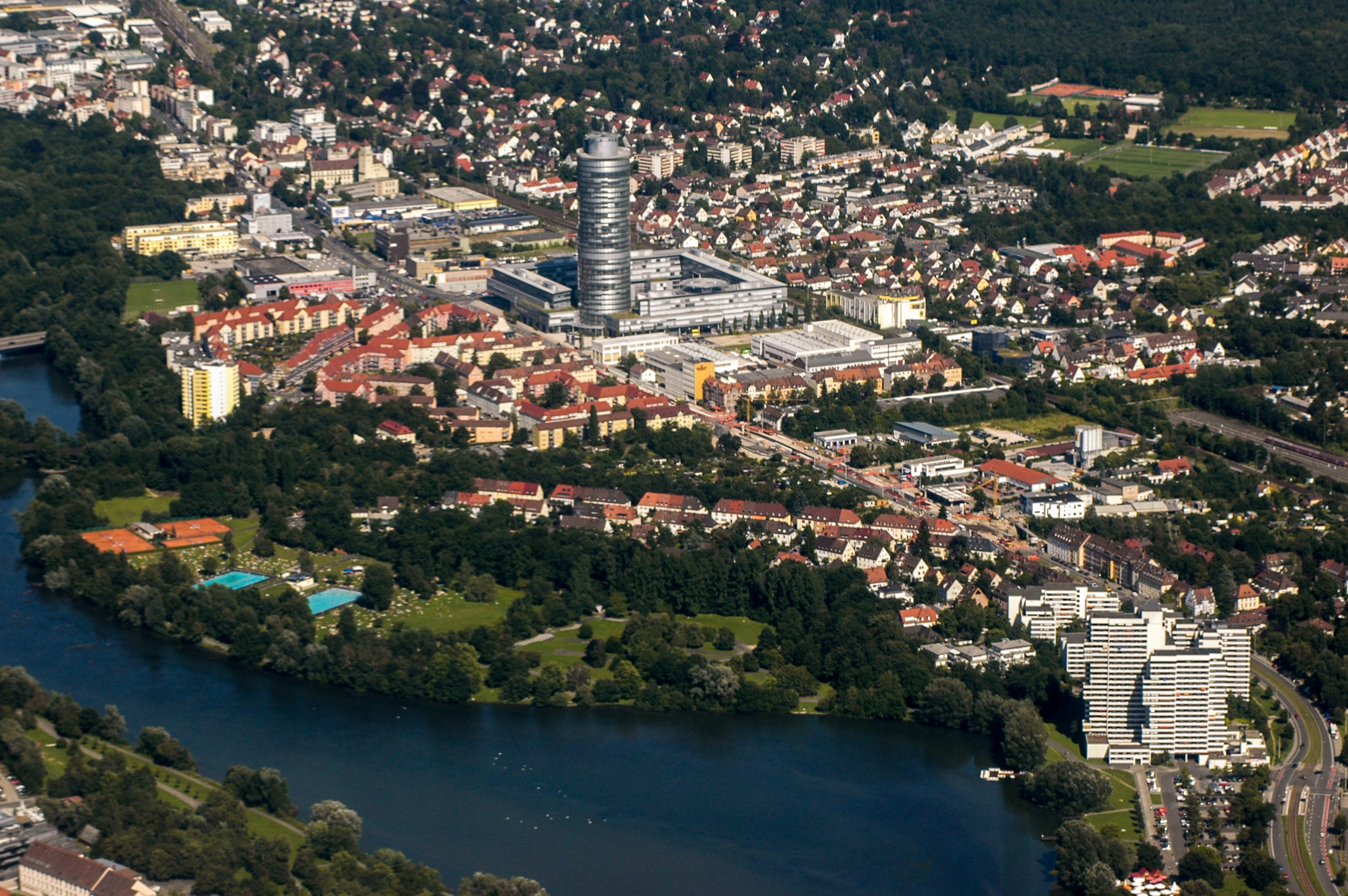
Nuremberg Business Area

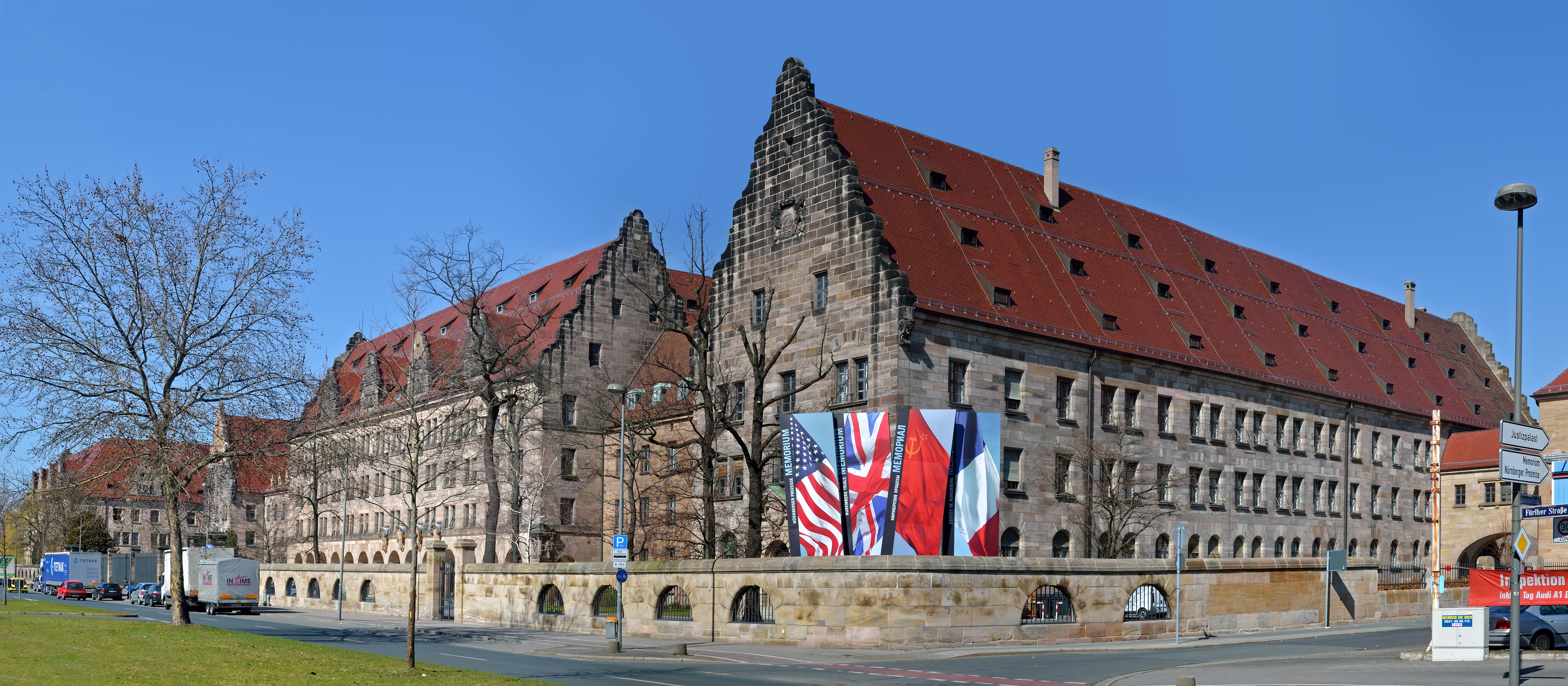
Palace of Justice, place of the Nuremberg Trials

=== Pedestrian zones ===
Like many European cities, Nuremberg offers a pedestrian-only zone covering a large portion of the old town, which is a main destination for shopping and specialty retail, including year-round Christmas stores where tourists and locals alike can purchase Christmas ornaments, gifts, decorations, and additions to their toy Christmas villages. The Craftsmen's Courtyard, or Handwerkerhof, is another tourist shopping destination in the style of a medieval village. It houses several local family-run businesses which sell handcrafted items from glass, wood, leather, pottery, and precious metals. The Handwerkerhof is also home to traditional German restaurants and beer gardens.

The Pedestrian zones of Nuremberg host festivals and markets throughout the year, the best known being Christkindlesmarkt, Germany's largest Christmas market and the gingerbread capital of the world. Visitors to the Christmas market can peruse the hundreds of stalls and purchase local wood crafts and nutcrackers while sampling Christmas sweets and traditional Glühwein.

== Politics ==
Nuremberg is represented in the Bundestag by two constituencies; Nuremberg North and Nuremberg South. Since 2002, both constituencies have been held by the CSU.

At the local level, Nuremberg has historically been left-leaning in the conservative state of Bavaria – since the end of World War II, the city has mainly elected SPD mayors with the exception of Ludwig Scholz (elected 1996, served until 2002) and Marcus König (elected 2020). From 1957 to 1987, the position of Chief Mayor (Oberbürgermeister) was continuously held by Andreas Urschlechter (SPD) for 30 years.

=== Mayor ===
Results of the second round of the 2020 mayoral election

The current mayor of Nuremberg is Marcus König of the Christian Social Union (CSU). The most recent mayoral election was held on 15 March 2020, with a runoff held on 29 March, and the results were as follows:

Candidate	Party	First round		Second round	
Candidate	Party	Votes	%	Votes	%
Marcus König	Christian Social Union	66,521	36.5	103,865	52.2
Thorsten Brehm	Social Democratic Party	63,742	34.9	95,237	47.8
Verena Osgyan	Alliance 90/The Greens	27,535	15.1		
Roland Hübscher	Alternative for Germany	7,696	4.2		
Titus Schüller	The Left	4,631	2.5		
Florian Betz	Pirate Party/Die PARTEI	2,153	1.2		
Christian Rechholz	Ecological Democratic Party	2,029	1.1		
Ümit Sormaz	Free Democratic Party	1,905	1.0		
Marion Padua	Left List Nuremberg	1,469	0.8		
Fridrich Luft	Citizens' Initiative A (BIA)	869	0.5		
Philipp Schramm	The Good Ones (Guten)	637	0.4		
Valid votes		182,493	99.6	199,102	99.2
Invalid votes		790	0.4	1,626	0.81
Total		183,283	100.0	200,728	100.0
Electorate/voter turnout		390,547	47.1	388,998	51.6
Source: City of Nuremberg (1st round, 2nd round)

=== City council ===
Results of the 2020 city council election

The Nuremberg city council governs the city alongside the Mayor. The most recent city council election was held on 15 March 2020, and the results were as follows:

Party	Votes	%	±	Seats	±
Christian Social Union (CSU)	3,584,755	31.3	▲1.9	22	▲1
Social Democratic Party (SPD)	2,943,118	25.7	▼18.4	18	▼13
Alliance 90/The Greens (Grüne)	2,283,988	20.0	▲11.0	14	▲8
Alternative for Germany (AfD)	650,369	5.7	New	4	New
The Left (Die Linke)	449,463	3.9	New	3	New
Free Voters of Bavaria (FW)	324,475	2.8	0.0	2	0
Ecological Democratic Party (ÖDP)	265,079	2.3	▲0.2	2	0
Free Democratic Party (FDP)	241,329	2.1	▲0.1	1	0
Die PARTEI/Pirate Party (PARTEI/Piraten)	194,693	1.7	New	1	0
Socio-Cultural Freedom, Participation and Sustainability (Politbande)	190,710	1.7	New	1	New
Left List Nuremberg	151,992	1.3	▼2.8	1	▼2
The Good Ones (Guten)	95,862	0.8	▼0.9	1	0
Citizens' Initiative A (BIA)	62,374	0.6	▼2.5	0	▼2
Valid votes	178,999	97.7			
Invalid votes	4,124	2.3			
Total	183,123	100.0		70	0
Electorate/voter turnout	389,547	47.0	▲2.7		
Source: City of Nuremberg

== Demographics ==
Nuremberg has been a destination for immigrants. 19.2% of the residents had an immigrant background in 2022 (counted with MigraPro).

Rank	Nationality	Population (31.12.2022)
1	Turkey	17,408
2	Romania	14,903
3	Greece	12,145
4	Italy	7,232
5	Ukraine	6,891
6	Poland	6,670
7	Croatia	5,893
8	Bulgaria	5,801
9	Iraq	4,745
10	Syria	4,710
11	Russia	3,617
12	Bosnia and Herzegovina	3,137
13	Serbia	3,027
14	Kosovo	2,456
15	Hungary	2,142

== Economy ==
=== Economic development ===
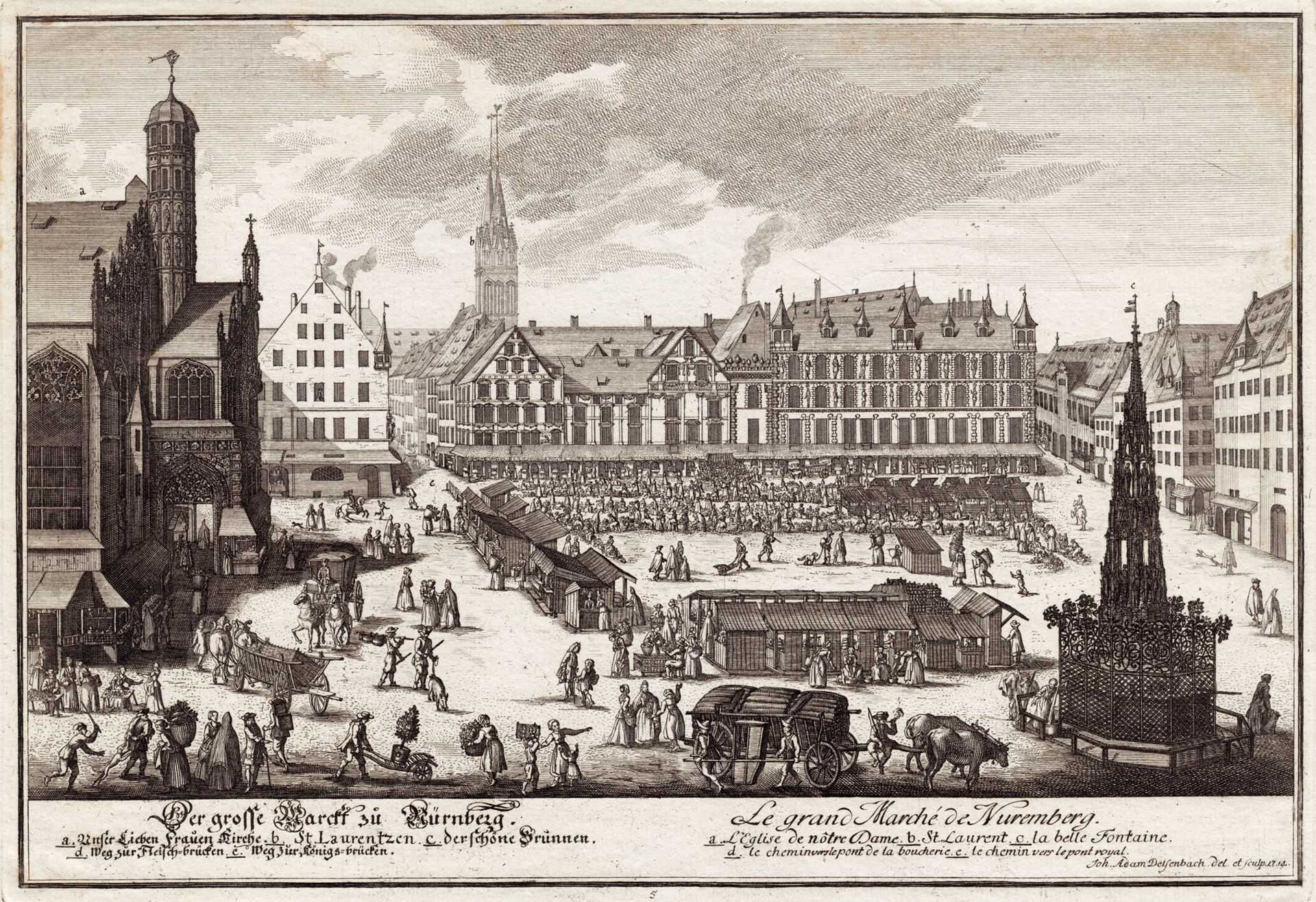
Nuremberg's main market square in 1714

In the Late Middle Ages, Nuremberg's merchants traded with Flanders, northern Italy and markets across Central Europe, exporting metal goods and textiles made by the city's craftspeople. A merchants' exchange was established in 1560, and the city's Banco Publico made it possible to settle payments by bank transfer from 1621. Merchant turnover remained below pre-war levels after the Thirty Years' War. Around 1800, Nuremberg was a distribution centre for imported goods such as coffee and tobacco, and local workshops were still producing pencils, measuring instruments and toys for export.

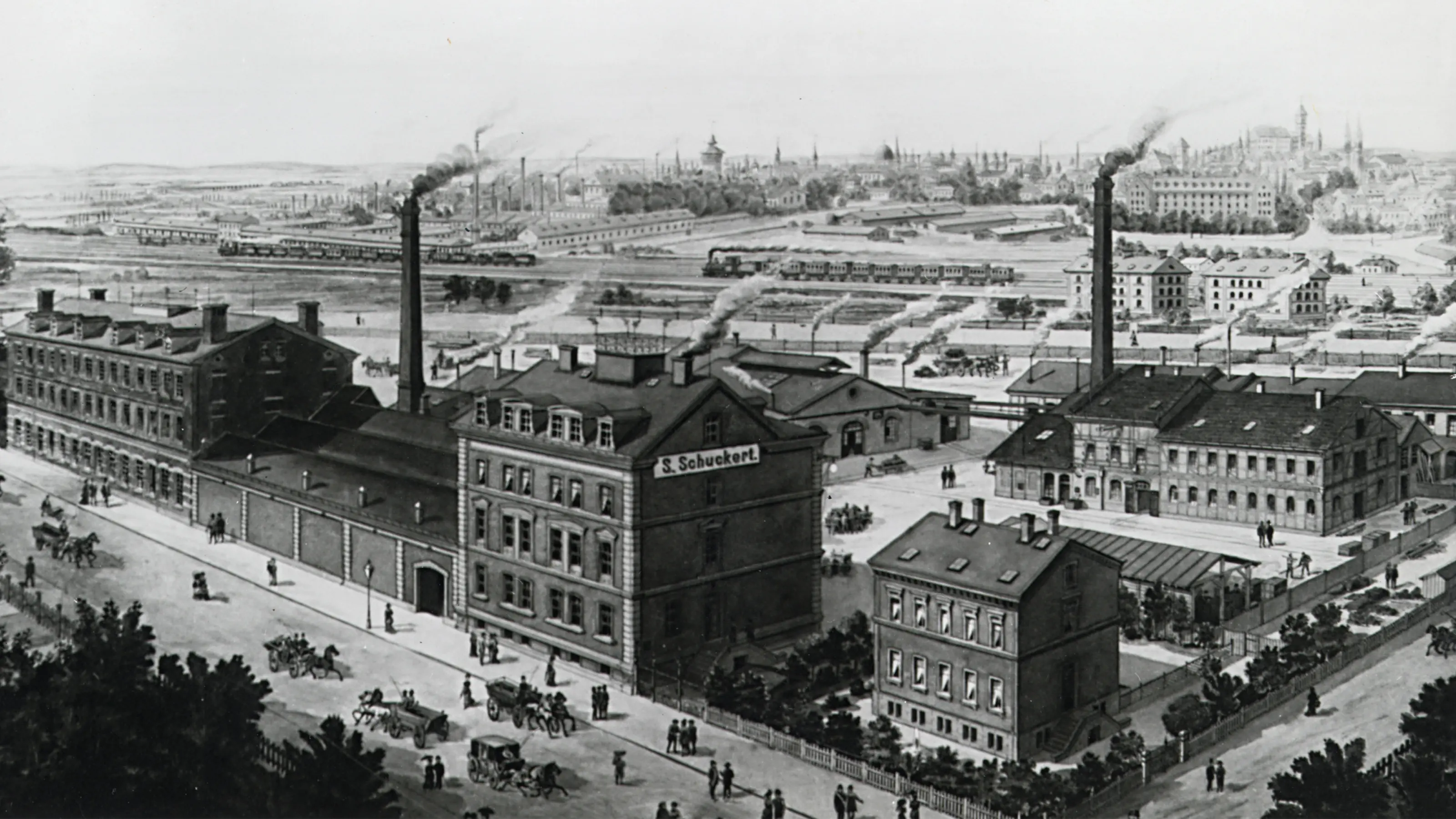
Sigmund Schuckert's electrical engineering works in 1903

Machine building and electrical engineering became major industries as Nuremberg industrialised in the 19th century. The engineering works developed by Theodor von Cramer-Klett, which made railway carriages and bridges, merged with an Augsburg firm in 1898 to form the company later known as MAN. The electrical engineering business founded by Sigmund Schuckert in Nuremberg in 1873 became part of Siemens-Schuckert in 1903. During the Second World War, MAN's Nuremberg plant built tanks and military lorries. The city's armaments industry used forced labour. After the war, Siemens rebuilt its damaged Nuremberg works, and AEG expanded its local production of household appliances in the 1950s.

Closures and job losses at large employers accompanied the shift towards a service economy. In the west of the city, AEG's appliance factory closed in 2007 and the Quelle mail-order distribution centre closed in 2009. The former AEG site was redeveloped for businesses, cultural uses and research, including the Energie Campus Nürnberg, where universities and research institutes collaborate on energy technology.

=== Economic key figures ===
In 2024, the city had a gross domestic product of €40.23 billion at current prices, about 5% of Bavaria's total. That year, services accounted for about four-fifths of the city's gross value added, and industry and construction together accounted for about one-fifth. On 30 June 2025, about 321,000 employees subject to social insurance contributions worked in Nuremberg, of whom 52% lived outside the city. The city's average unemployment rate in 2025 was 7.3%, compared with 4.4% in the wider Nuremberg labour market region.

=== Companies ===
DATEV offices in Nuremberg

Siemens Energy manufactures transformers in the city at a plant that has produced them since 1912. In 2025, MAN Truck & Bus began manufacturing battery packs for commercial vehicles at its Nuremberg works, where it also makes diesel engines. Nuremberg is the headquarters of DATEV, a co-operative founded in 1966 that supplies software and IT services to tax advisers and other professional firms. The market research firm GfK grew out of the Gesellschaft für Konsumforschung, founded in Nuremberg in 1934.

=== Trade fairs and tourism ===
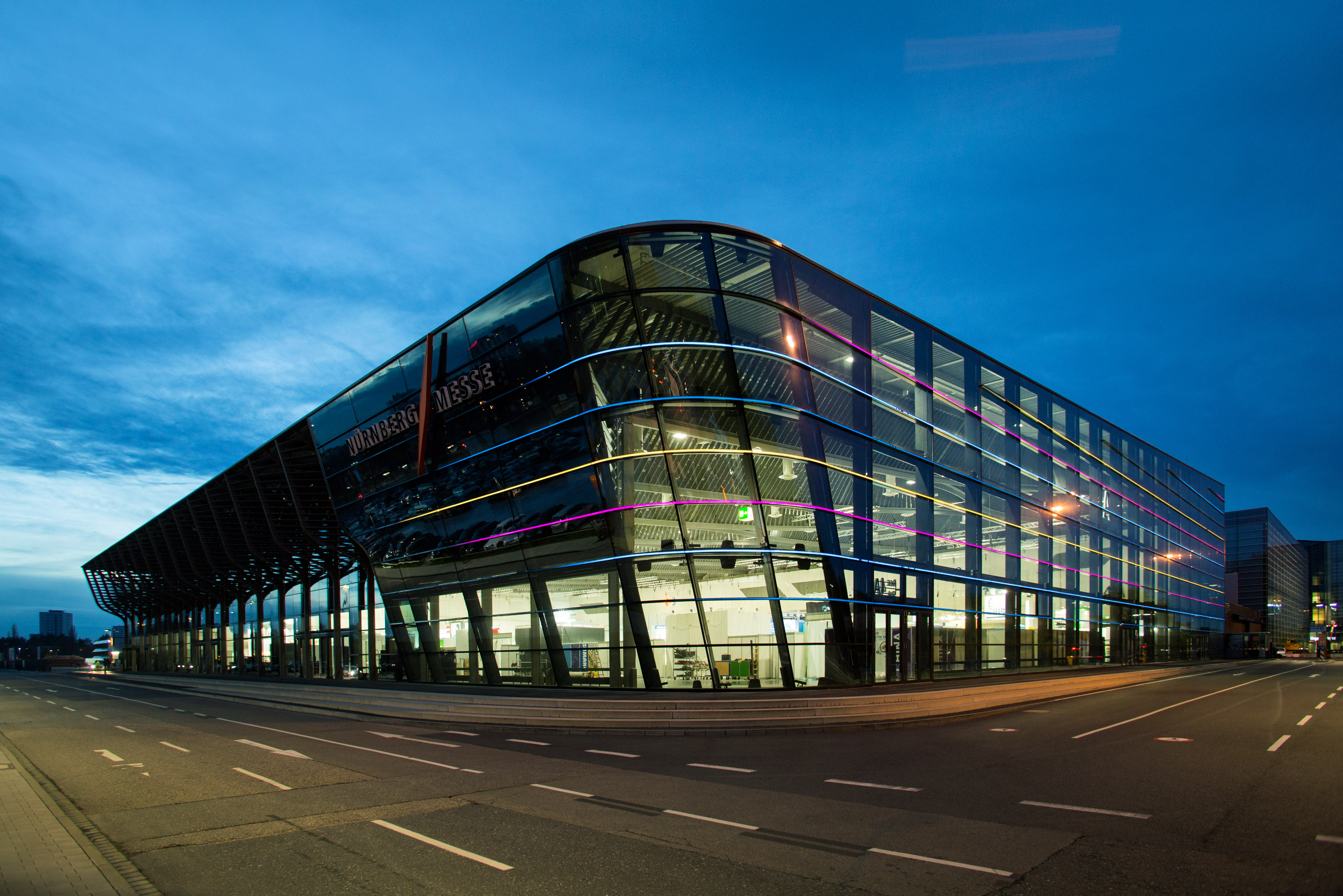
An exhibition hall at the Nuremberg Exhibition Centre

The Nuremberg International Toy Fair was first held in 1950, when the division of Germany prompted the search for a trade fair venue in the west to replace Leipzig. The fair outgrew its original site and helped drive the construction of the exhibition centre in Langwasser, which opened in 1973 and hosts trade fairs and congresses. The 2026 toy fair drew 2,313 exhibitors from 68 countries, according to the organiser. It is the largest of its kind in the world. The city also hosts BioFach, an international trade fair for organic products. A study commissioned by the city's tourism board estimated that visitors spent €2.36 billion in Nuremberg in 2023, with day trips accounting for about two-thirds of the total. There are over 175 registered places of accommodation in Nuremberg, ranging from hostels to luxury hotels, bed and breakfasts, to multi-hundred room properties.

=== Media ===
Regional television and radio is provided by BR which broadcast from Munich. However, the network has a studio in the city which broadcast the local-opt of Frankenschau aktuell (covering the city and Franconia region) on TV and Bayern 1-Franken on radio. Franken Fernsehen is a local TV channel based in the city.

Local radio is provided by Hit Radio N1, Radio F, Energy Nürnberg, AFK max, Gong 97.1, and Radio Z.

The city's local newspapers include the Nürnberger Nachrichten and the Nürnberger Zeitung.

== Transport ==
The city's location next to numerous highways, railways, and a waterway has contributed to its rising importance for trade with Eastern Europe.

=== Railways ===
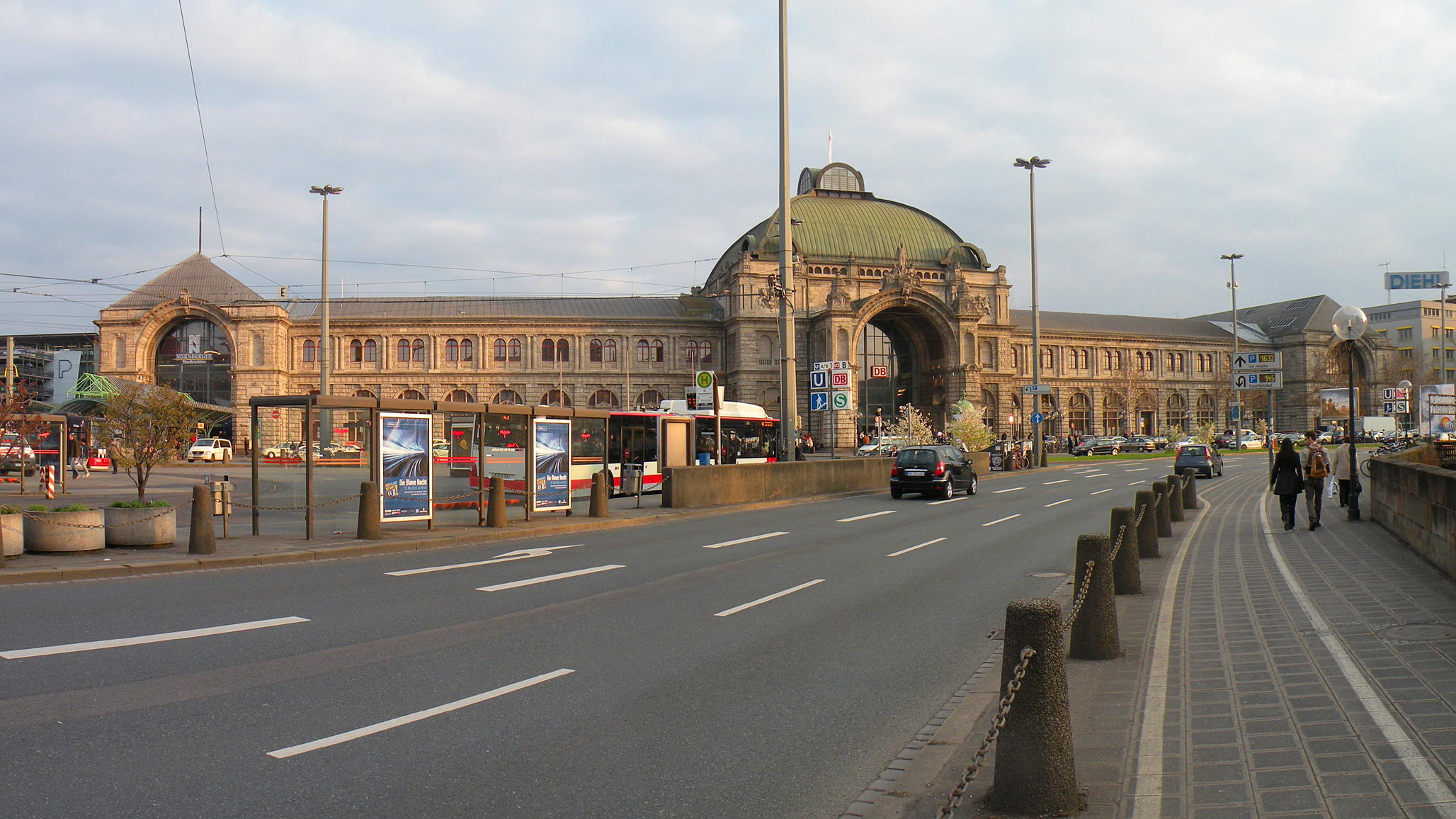
The main railway station

Nürnberg Hauptbahnhof is a stop for IC, Nightjet (NJ) and ICE trains on the German long-distance railway network. The Nuremberg–Ingolstadt–Munich high-speed line with 300 km/h (186 mph) operation opened 28 May 2006, and was fully integrated into the rail schedule on 10 December 2006. Travel times to Munich have been reduced to as little as one hour. The Nuremberg–Erfurt high-speed railway opened in December 2017.

=== City and regional transport ===
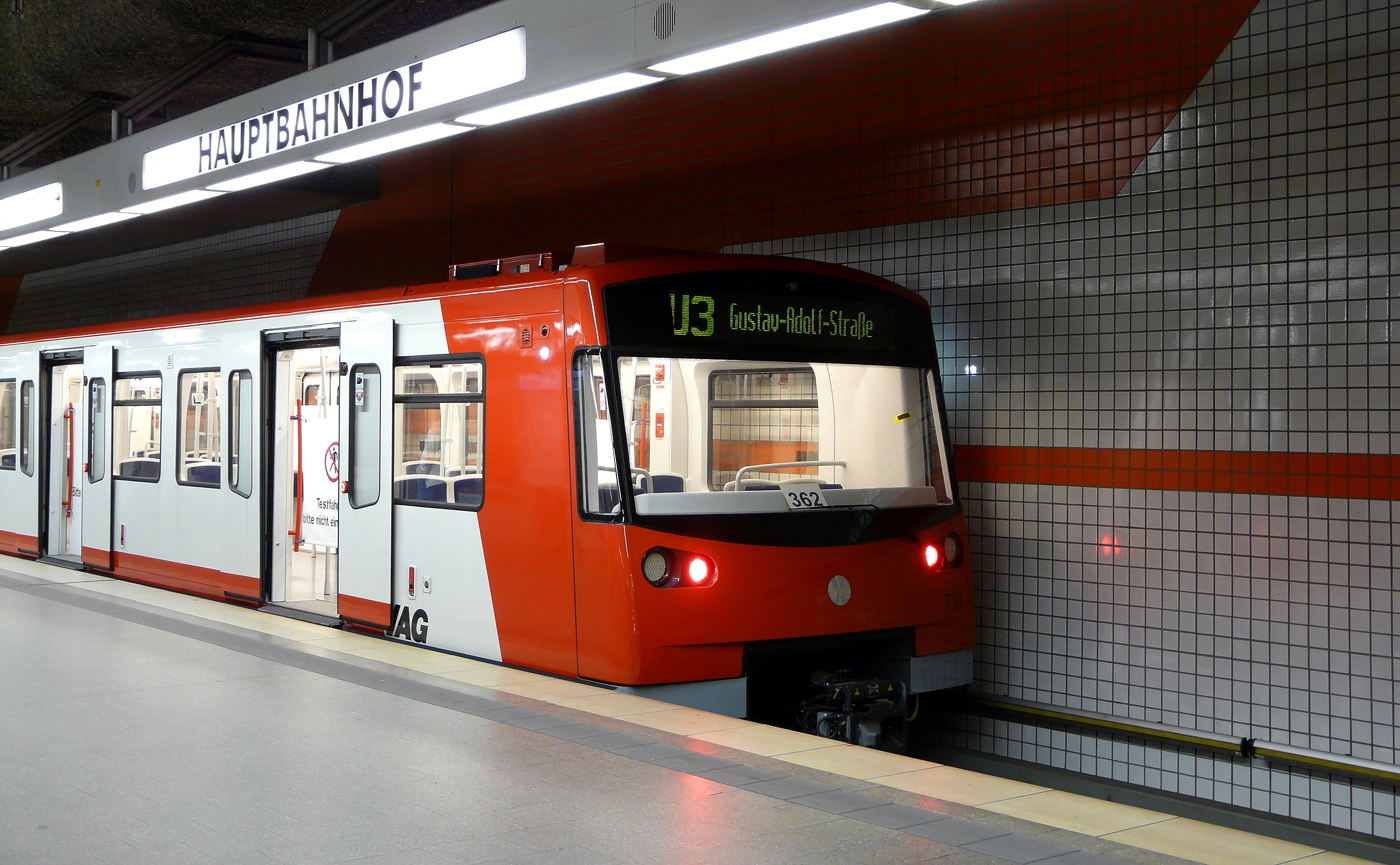
An automatic U-Bahn train on the line U3

The Nuremberg tramway network was opened in 1881. As of 2008, it extends a total length of 36 km (22 mi), has six lines, and carried 39.152 million passengers annually. The first segment of the Nuremberg U-Bahn metro system was opened in 1972. Nuremberg's trams, buses and U-Bahn are operated by the Verkehrs-Aktiengesellschaft Nürnberg (VAG; Nuremberg Transport Corporation), a member of the Verkehrsverbund Großraum Nürnberg (VGN; Greater Nuremberg Transport Network).

There is also a Nuremberg S-Bahn suburban metro railway and a regional train network, both centred on Nürnberg Hauptbahnhof. Since 2008, Nuremberg has had the first U-Bahn in Germany (U2/U21 and U3) that works without a driver. It also was the first subway system worldwide in which both driver-operated trains and computer-controlled trains shared tracks.

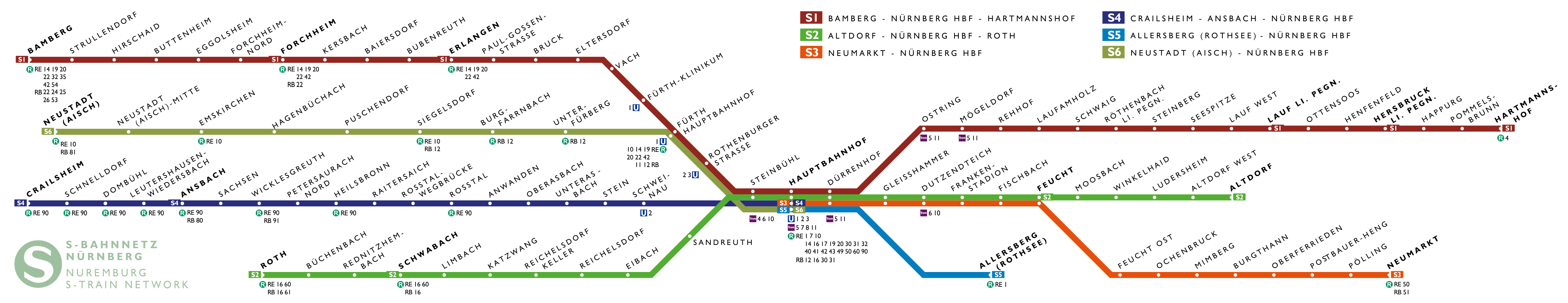
S-Bahn network

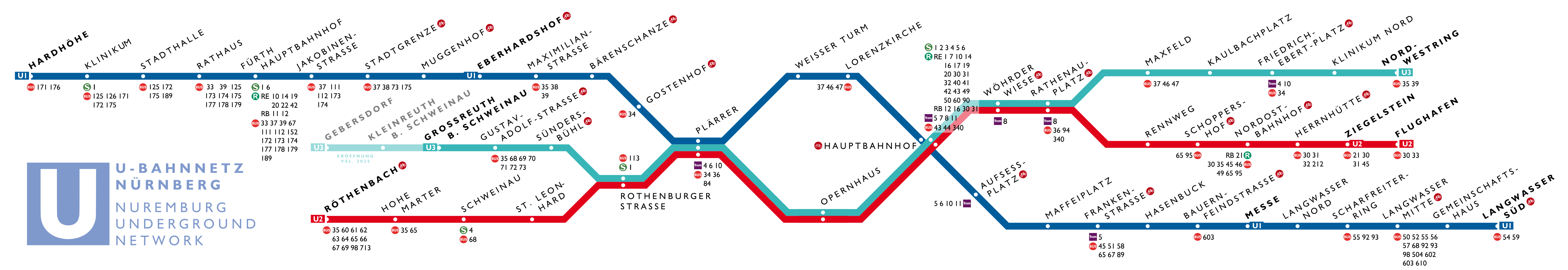
U-Bahn network

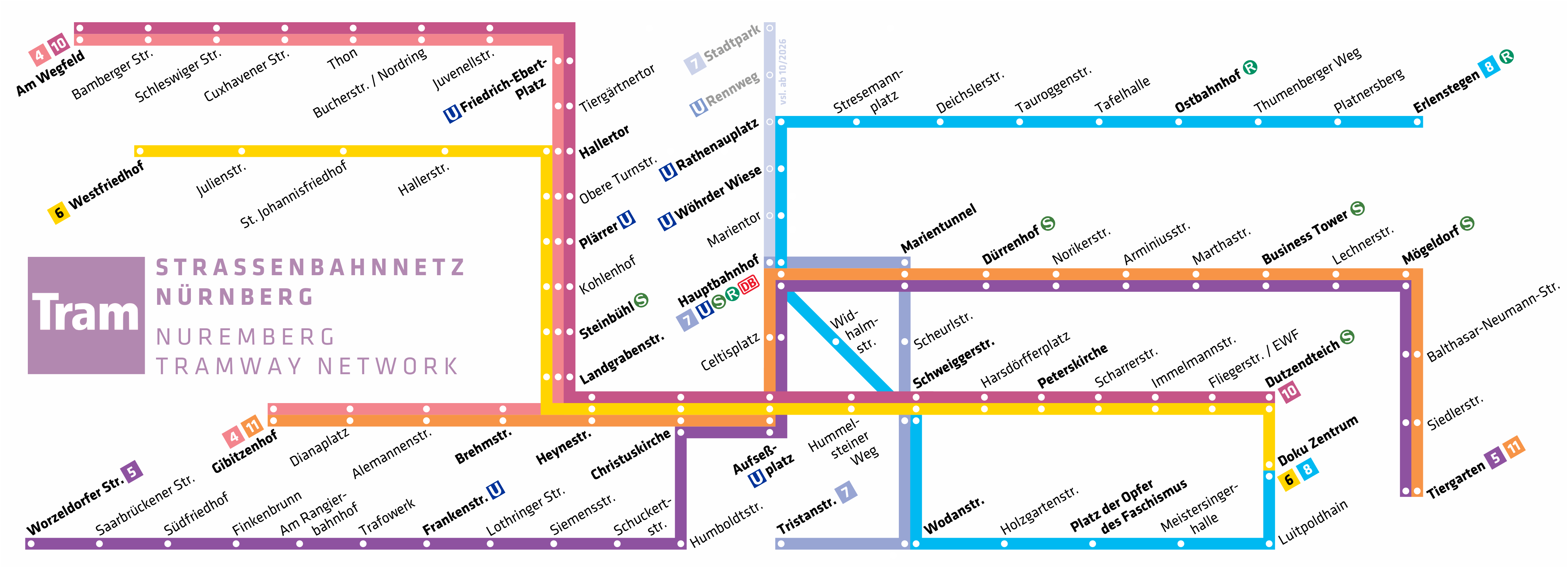
Tramway Network

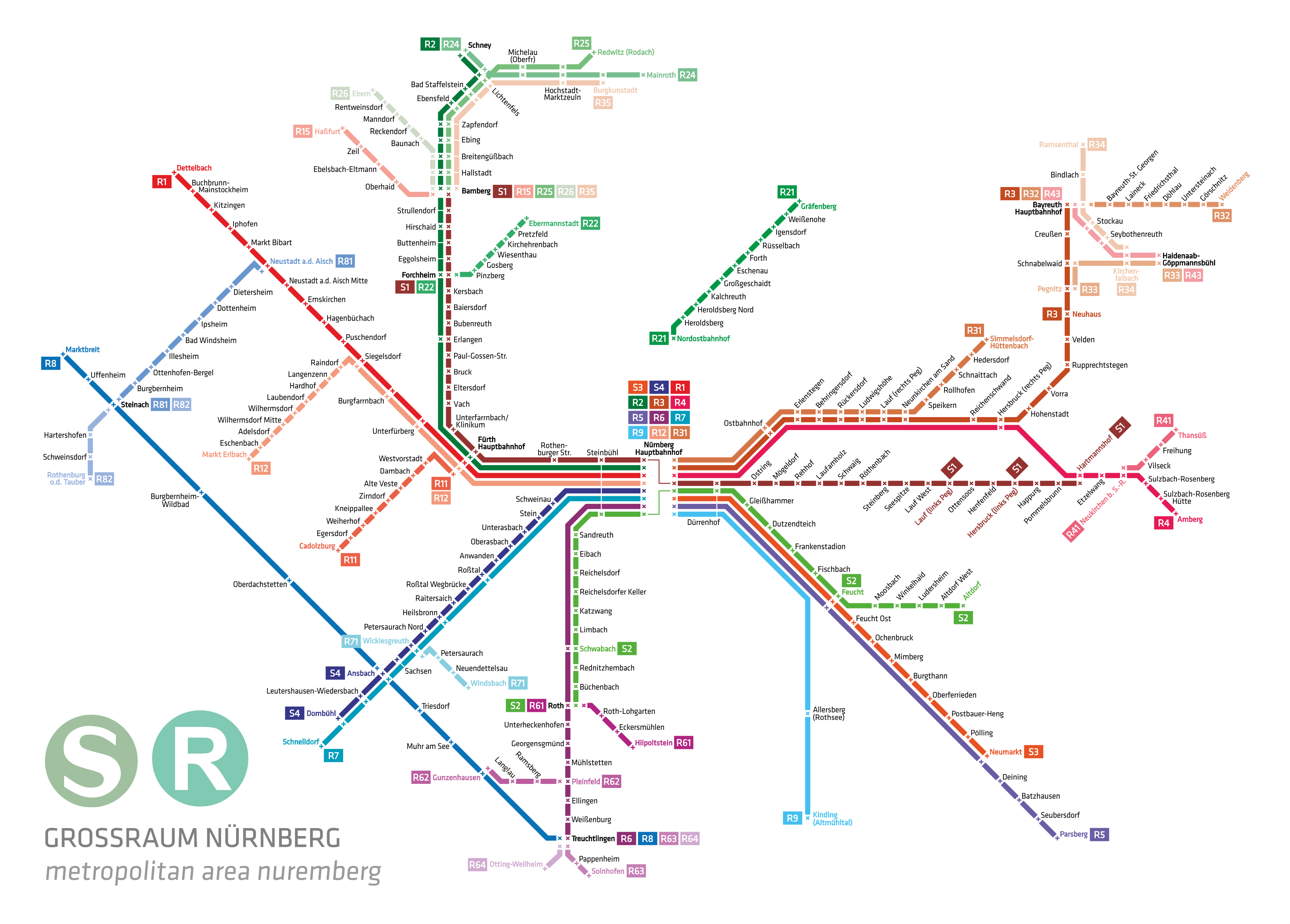
S- and R-Bahn network

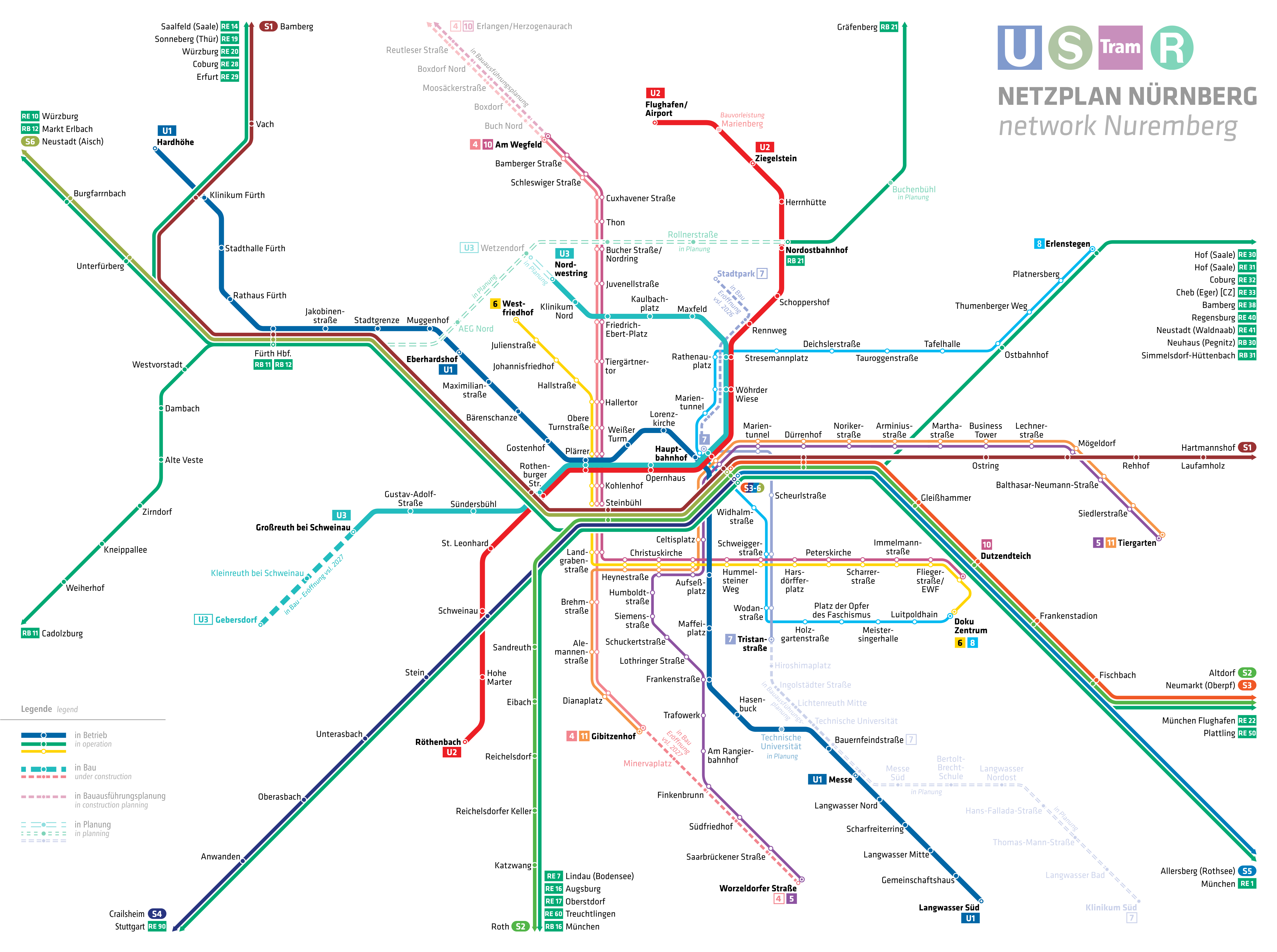
S-, U-Bahn and Tramway network

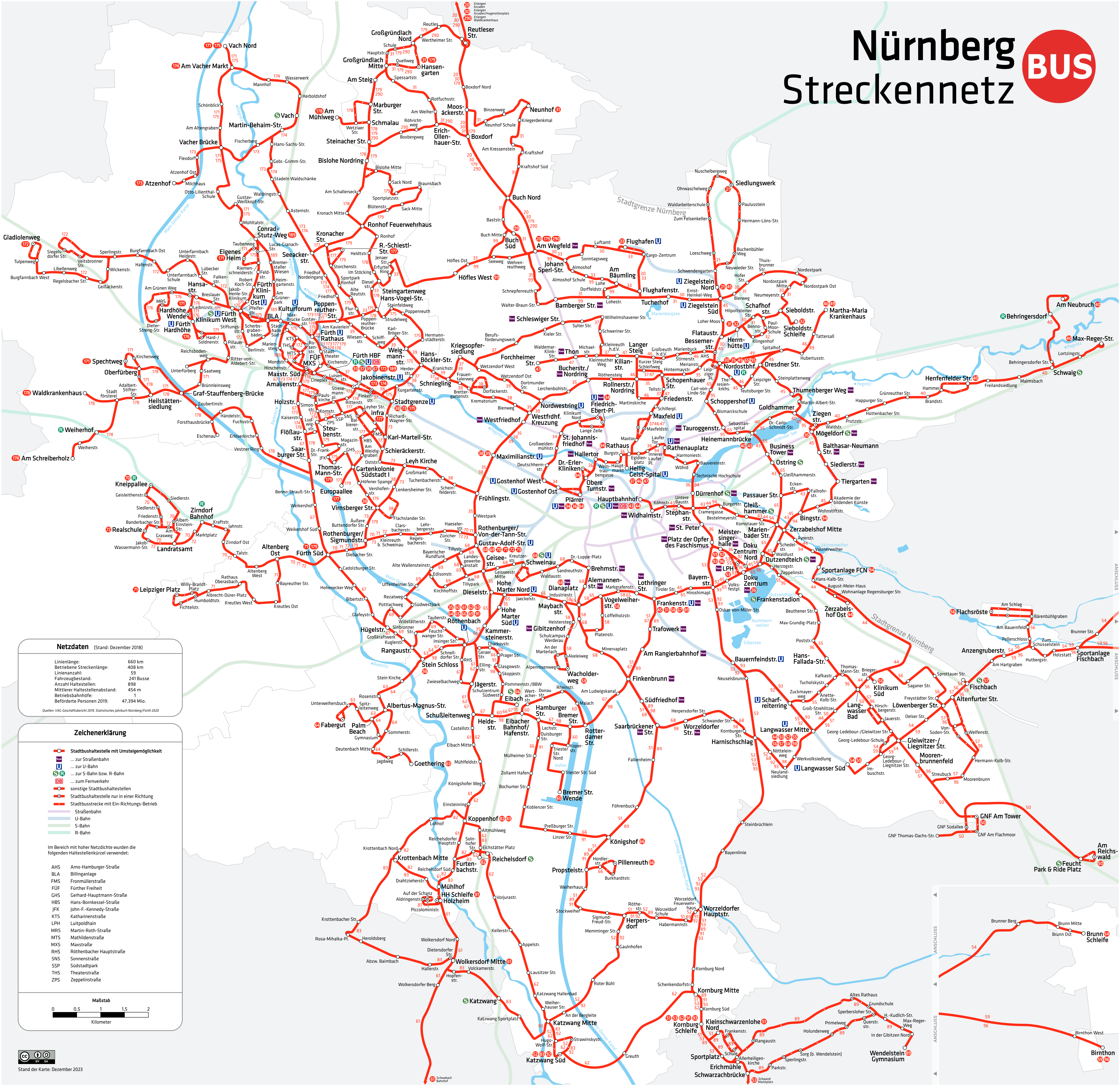
Bus map

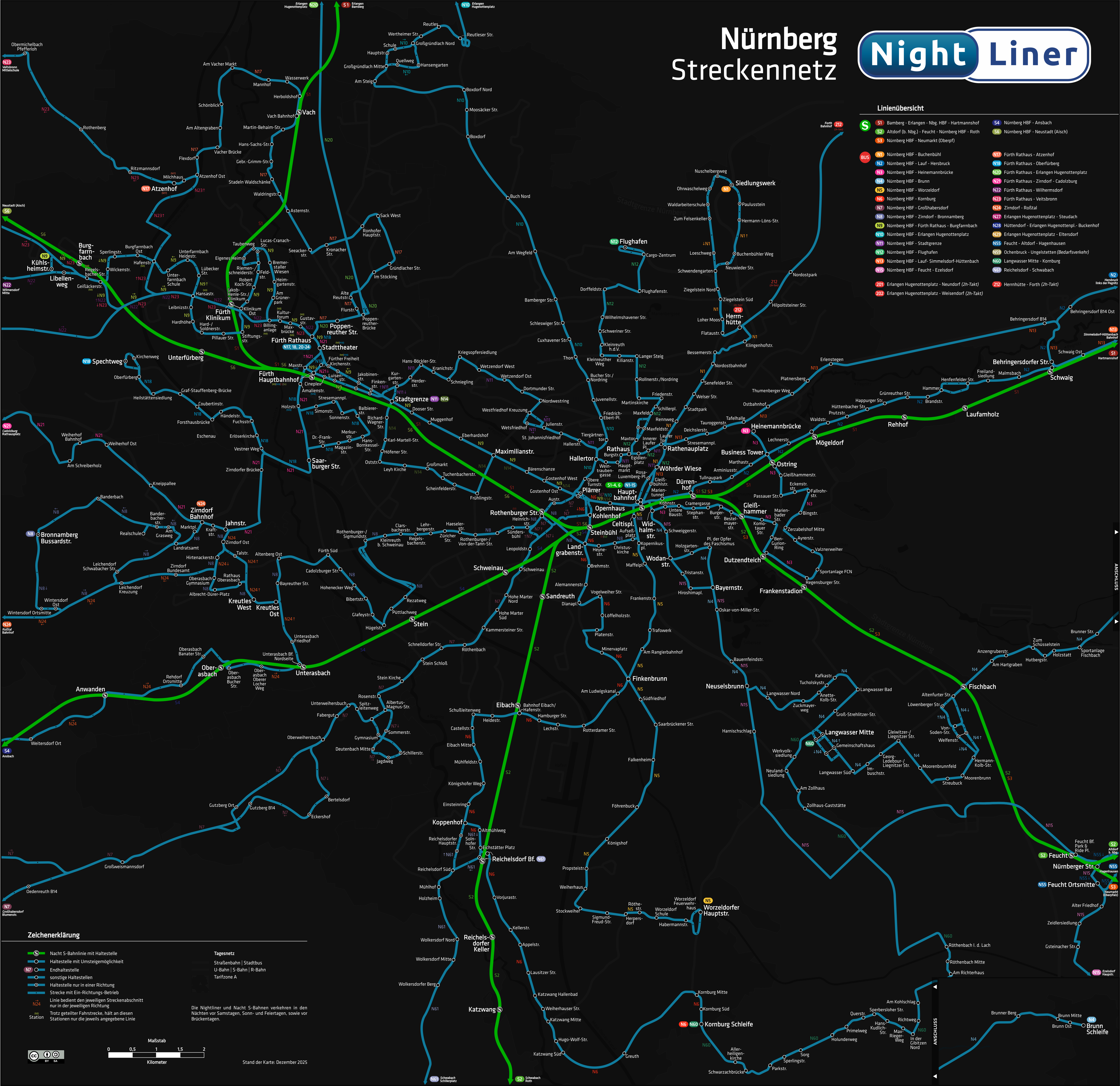
Nightbus and S-Bahn map

=== Motorways ===
Nuremberg is located at the junction of several important Autobahn routes. The A3 (Netherlands–Frankfurt–Würzburg–Vienna) passes in a south-easterly direction along the north-east of the city. The A9 (Berlin–Munich) passes in a north–south direction on the east of the city. The A6 (France–Saarbrücken–Prague) passes in an east–west direction to the south of the city. Finally, the A73 begins in the south-east of Nuremberg and travels north-west through the city before continuing towards Fürth and Bamberg.

=== Airport ===
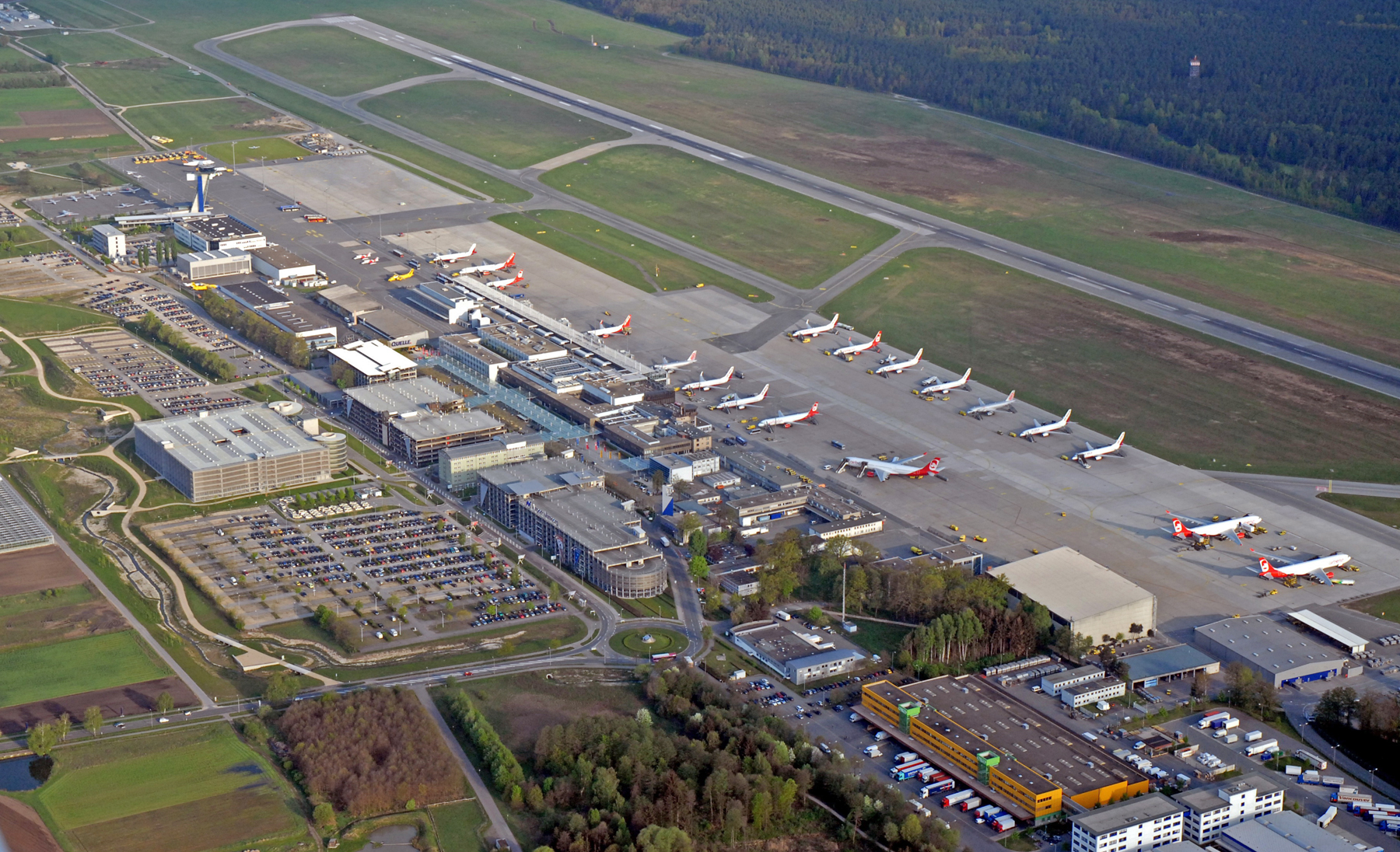
Aerial image of Nuremberg Airport

Nuremberg Airport has flights to major German cities and many European destinations. The largest operators are currently Eurowings and TUI fly Deutschland, while the low-cost Ryanair and Wizz Air companies connect the city to various European centres. A significant amount of the airport's traffic flies to and from mainly touristic destinations during the peak winter season. The airport (Flughafen) is the terminus of Nuremberg U-Bahn Line 2; until 2021, it was the only airport in Germany served by a U-Bahn subway system.

=== Canals ===
Nuremberg is an important port on the Rhine–Main–Danube Canal.

== Education ==
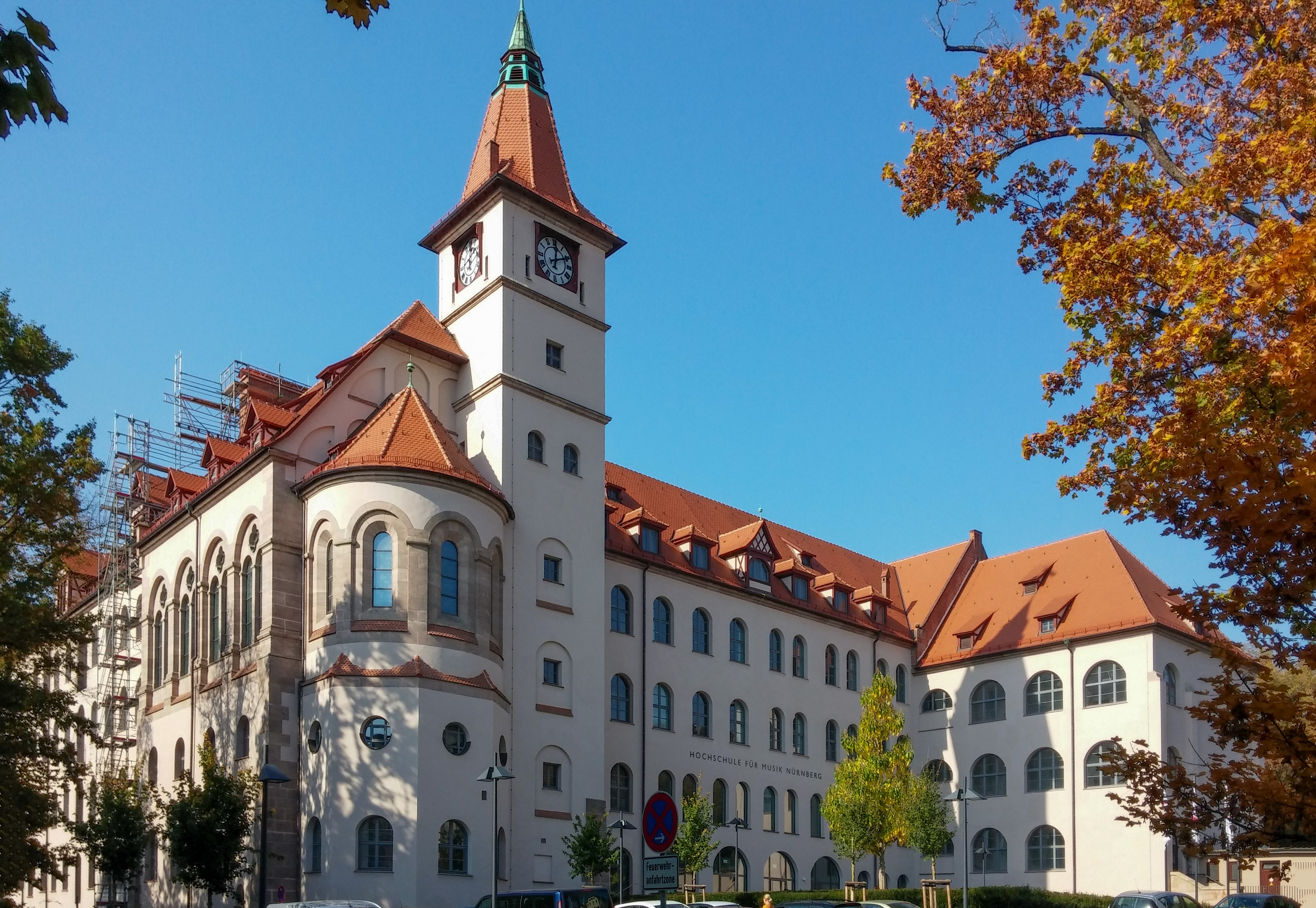
The Hochschule für Musik Nürnberg

Nuremberg has 51 public and 6 private elementary schools in nearly all of its districts. Secondary education is offered at 23 Mittelschulen, 12 Realschulen and 17 Gymnasien (state, city, church, and privately owned). There are also several other providers of secondary education such as Berufsschule, Berufsfachschule, Wirtschaftsschule etc.

=== Higher education ===
Nuremberg has the prestigious University of Technology Nuremberg (UTN), a newly founded technical university in Germany. The city also hosts the joint university Friedrich-Alexander-Universität Erlangen-Nürnberg, two Fachhochschulen (Technische Hochschule Nürnberg and Evangelische Hochschule Nürnberg), a pure art academy (Akademie der Bildenden Künste Nürnberg, the first art academy in the German-speaking world) in addition to the design faculty at the TH and a music conservatoire (Hochschule für Musik Nürnberg). There are also private schools such as the Akademie Deutsche POP Nürnberg offering higher education.

== Sport ==
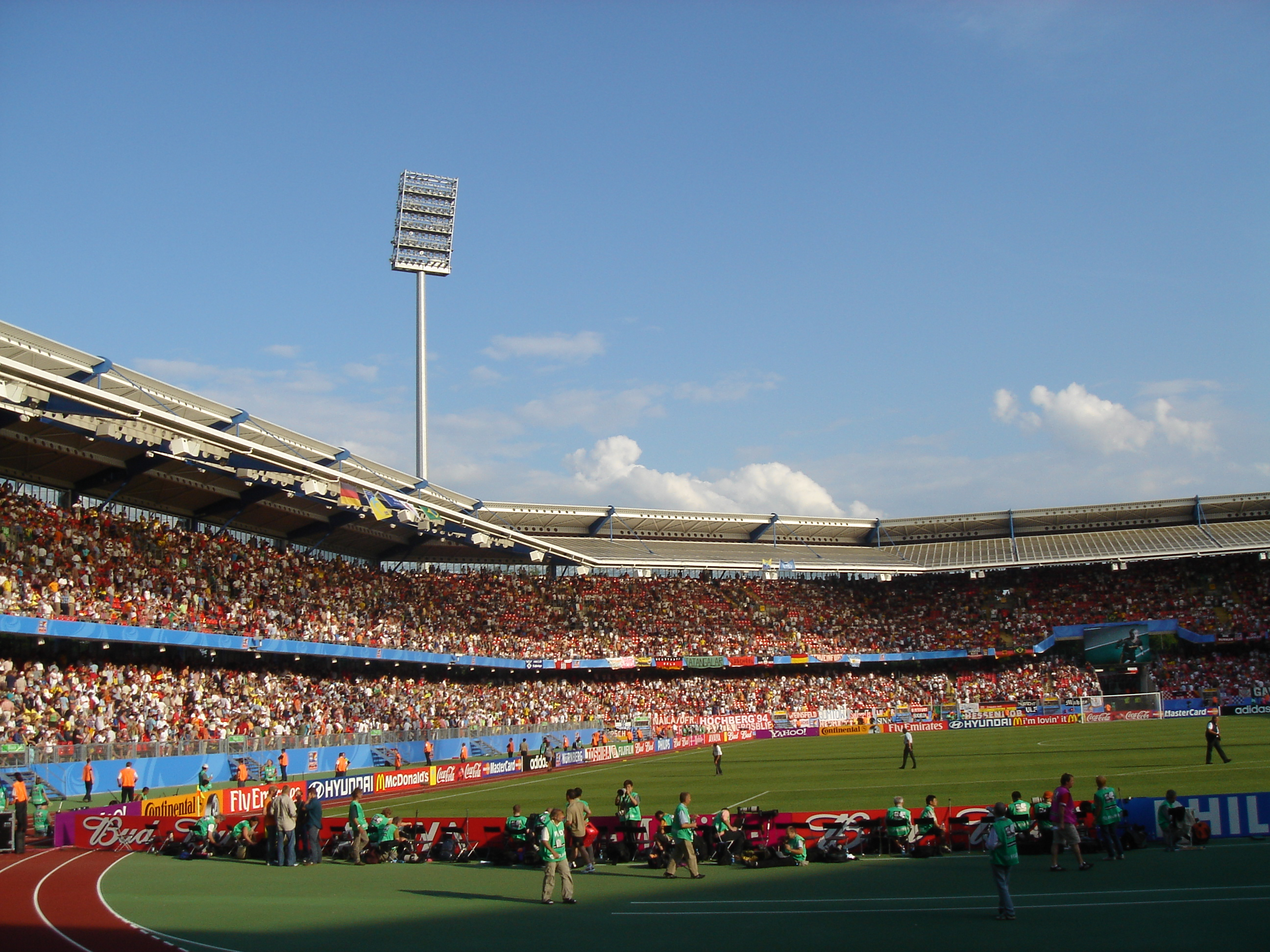
Max-Morlock-Stadion is the football stadium of Bundesliga club 1. FC Nürnberg.

=== Football ===
1. FC Nürnberg, known locally as Der Club (English: "The Club"), was founded in 1900 and currently plays in the 2.Bundesliga with its men's team and in the Frauen-Bundesliga with its women's team. The official colours of the association are red and white, but the traditional colours are red and black. They won their first regional title in the Southern German championship in 1916 closely followed by their first national title in 1920. Besides the eleven regional championships they won the German championship for a total of nine times. With this they held the record for the most German championship titles until 1986 when the current record holder FC Bayern München surpassed them. The current Chief Officers are Niels Rossow (CEO, CMO, CSO), Stefan Heim (CFO) and Joti Chatzialexiou (COO, sporting). They play in Max-Morlock-Stadion which was refurbished for the 2006 FIFA World Cup and accommodates 50,000 spectators.

- German Champion: 1920, 1921, 1924, 1925, 1927, 1936, 1948, 1961, 1968
- German Cup: 1935, 1939, 1962, 2007

TuS Bar Kochba is a league that was founded in 1913 as a social-sport club for the Jewish community in Nürnberg. Established as the "Jewish Gymnastics and Sports Club Nuremberg", the league was dissolved by the Nazi party in 1939. It was reformed in 1966. The club plays in the senior A-league of the Bavarian Football Association.

=== Motorsport ===
The Deutsche Tourenwagen Masters make an annual stop each summer to the Norisring circuit.

=== Basketball ===
The Baskets Nürnberg played in the Basketball Bundesliga from 2005 to 2007. Since then, teams from Nuremberg have attempted to return to Germany's elite league. The recently founded Nürnberg Falcons BC have already established themselves as one of the main teams in Germany's second division ProA and aim to take on the heritage of the SELLBYTEL Baskets Nürnberg. The Falcons play their home games at the KIA Metropol Arena.

=== Ice hockey ===
The Nürnberg Ice Tigers play in the country's premier league, the Deutsche Eishockey Liga. They've been runner-up in 1999 and 2007. The Ice Tigers play their home games at the Arena Nürnberger Versicherung.

== International relations ==
=== Twin towns – sister cities ===
Nuremberg is twinned with:

- Nice, France, since 1954
- Kraków, Poland, since 1979
- Skopje, North Macedonia, since 1982
- San Carlos, Nicaragua, since 1985
- Glasgow, Scotland, since 1985
- Prague, Czech Republic, since 1990
- Kharkiv, Ukraine, since 1990
- Hadera, Israel, since 1995
- Shenzhen, China, since 1997
- Antalya, Turkey, since 1997
- Atlanta, United States, since 1998
- Kavala, Greece, since 1999
- Córdoba, Spain, since 2010
- Brașov, Romania, since 2024

=== Cooperation ===
Nuremberg also cooperates with:

- Venice, Italy; since 1954 a twin town, relations renewed in 1999 as a cooperation agreement

=== Associated cities ===
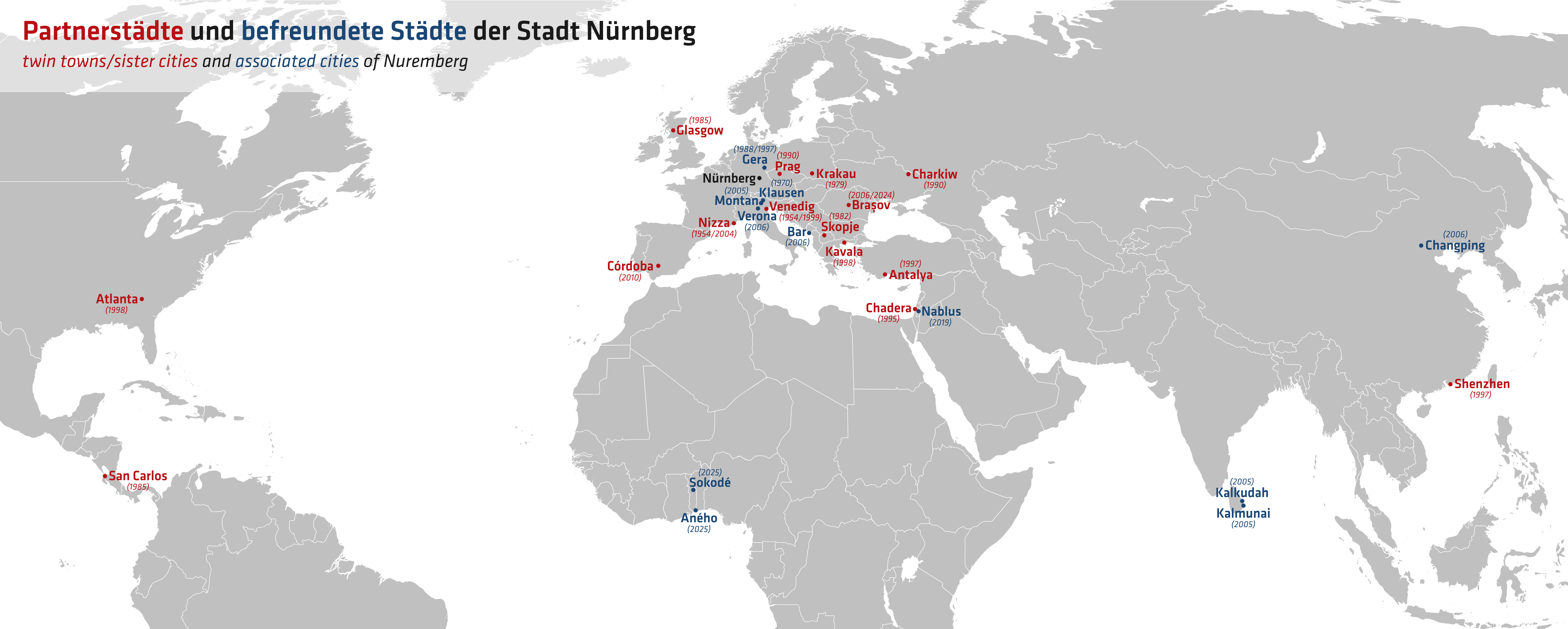
Twin towns/sister cities and associated cities of Nuremberg

Nuremberg maintains friendly relations with:

- Klausen, Italy, since 1970
- Gera, Germany, since 1988, renewed 1997
- Kalkudah, Sri Lanka, since 2005
- Bar, Montenegro, since 2006
- Changping, China, since 2006
- Montan, Italy, since 2012
- Nablus, Palestine, since 2015
- Aného, Togo, since 2025
- Sokodé, Togo, since 2025

== See also ==
- List of mayors of Nuremberg
- Norisring Racetrack, where Pedro Rodríguez died in 1971
- Nuremberg Architecture Prize
