= Old Town Friends Nuremberg =

Historical society in Nuremberg, Germany

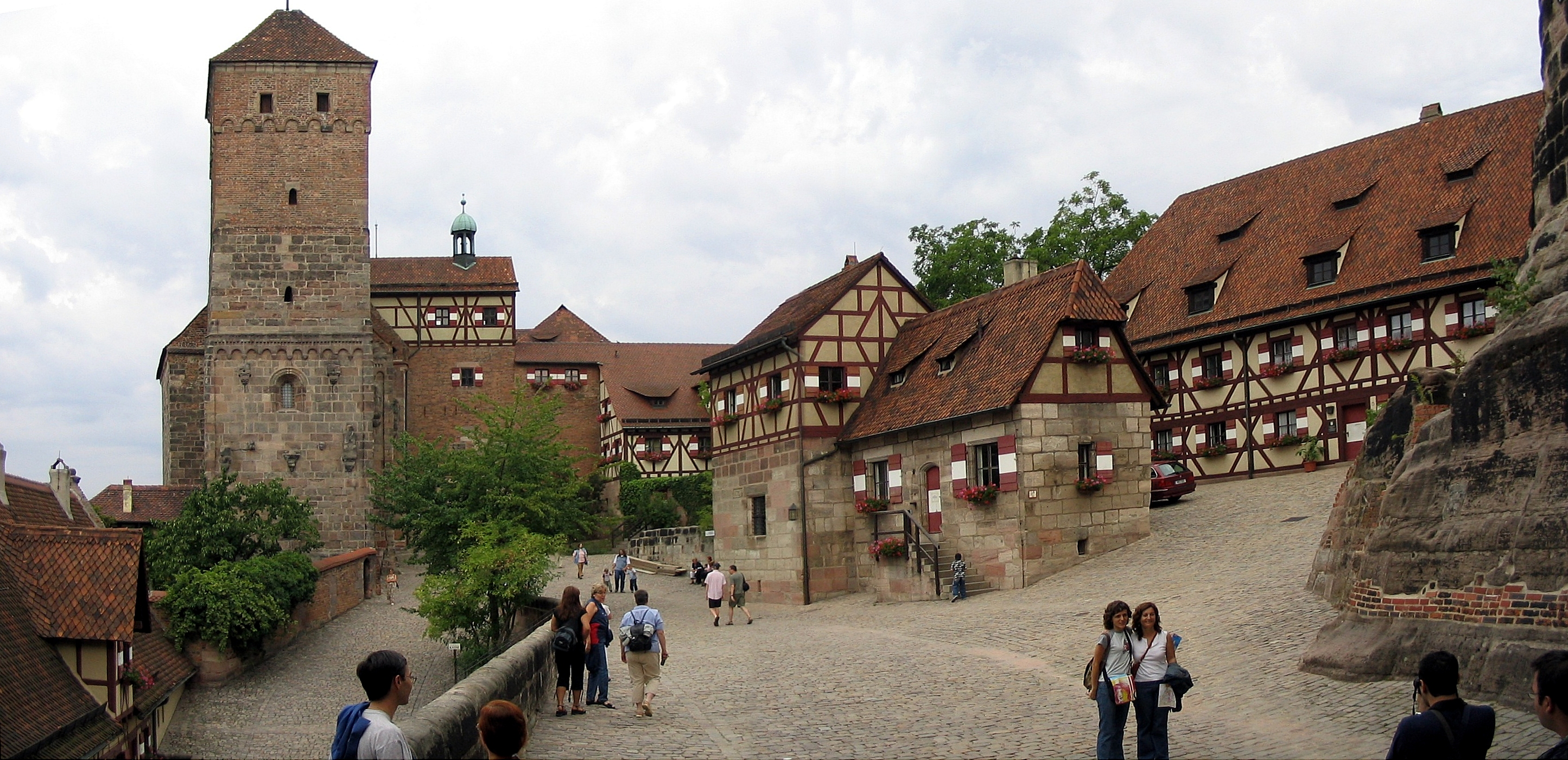
Nuremberg Imperial Castle

The Old Town Friends Nuremberg (German: Altstadtfreunde Nürnberg e. V.) are an association that supports the preservation and restoration of the existing historical old town houses and other architectural monuments in Nuremberg that are worth preserving.

== Activities ==
=== General ===
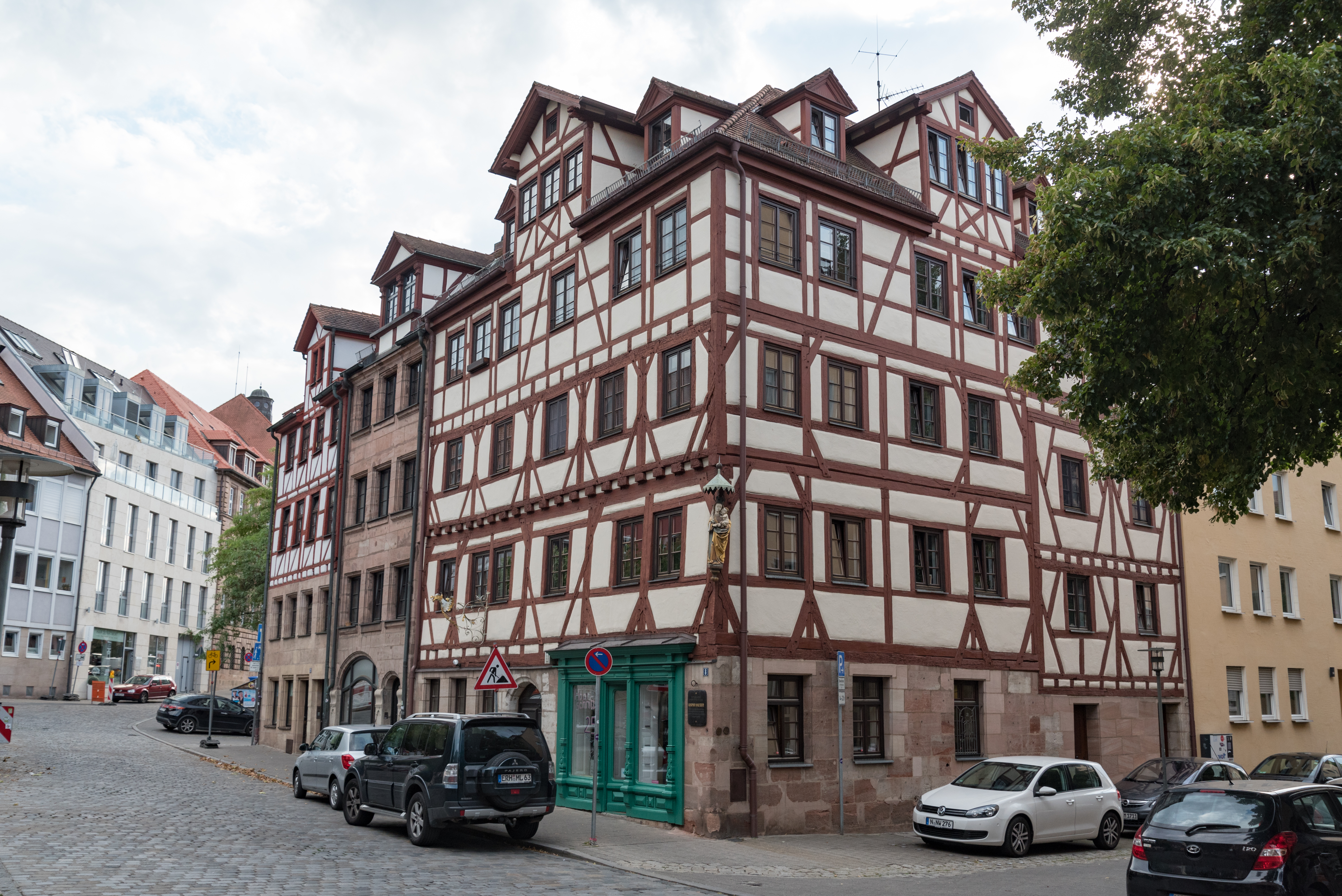
The four medieval buildings on Unschlittplatz that the organisation saved from demolition in 1973 and later restored

The association was founded on January 25, 1950 under the name "Association of Friends of the Old Town Nuremberg. It works to preserve the old town of Nuremberg, since the devastation it suffered in World War Two. It aims to ensure new building work is carried out in a way that is appropriate with the historic character of the old town. The old town friends buy old town houses in order to restore and preserve them. They do this through inheritance or donation or buying the house. Among other things, it works to try to highlight the history and importance of Nuremberg's old town to citizens and tourists. They run group tours through the old town (which since 2002 have involved more than 250,000), monthly lectures and have an annual publication of reports about the old town. Between 1972 and 1978, the association achieved a groundbreaking success with the rescue of four medieval half-timbered houses on Unschlittplatz, which had already been scheduled for demolition.

The Old Town Friends grew from a small association with 135 members to their current size with about 6,000 members (status: 2002). This makes them the largest culturally active citizens' association in Nuremberg. Since June 2010 the chairman has been Karl-Heinz Enderle. By 2002, the association had carried out 220 construction projects, including 38 half-timbered buildings, the preservation of nine houses through purchase and renovation, and eight others through resale. From 1973 to 2002, the Friends of the Old Town generated a total of over 15 million euros through these measures.

The Old Town Friends have also played an active role in influencing the development designs in the City. A notable example of this was in 1996, when the association opposed an architectural design draft for the Augustinerhof - a building in the central market area of the old town, which intended by the city planners of Nuremberg to give the city centre a "modern flair". In the opinion of the Old Town Friends, the project would not have been appropriate for the area. A referendum was held on the design, and on January 14, 1996, 67,284 voted against the new construction project and only 30,637 for it, which prevented the implementation.

Since then, the association has had much influence on designs of new buildings in the city. They have not always been successful in getting designs they have approved of, but have had much success nonetheless. For instance, in 2009 the association articulated its resistance to the new construction of the city library, which was unsuccessful.

== Projects ==
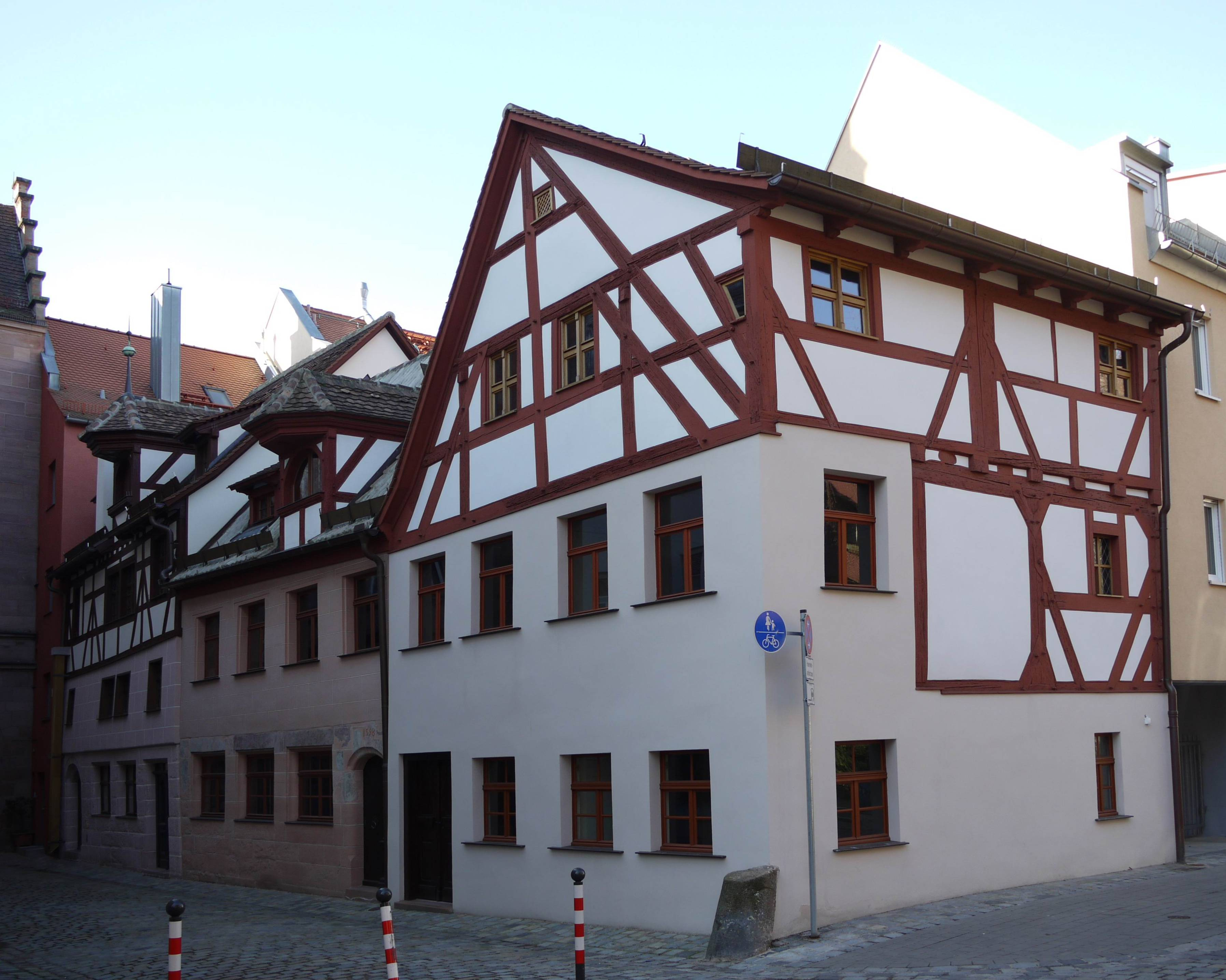
The three Kühnertsgasse Medieval Craftsmen's houses (German: Handwerkerhäuser) after their 2010 restoration by the Old Town Friends

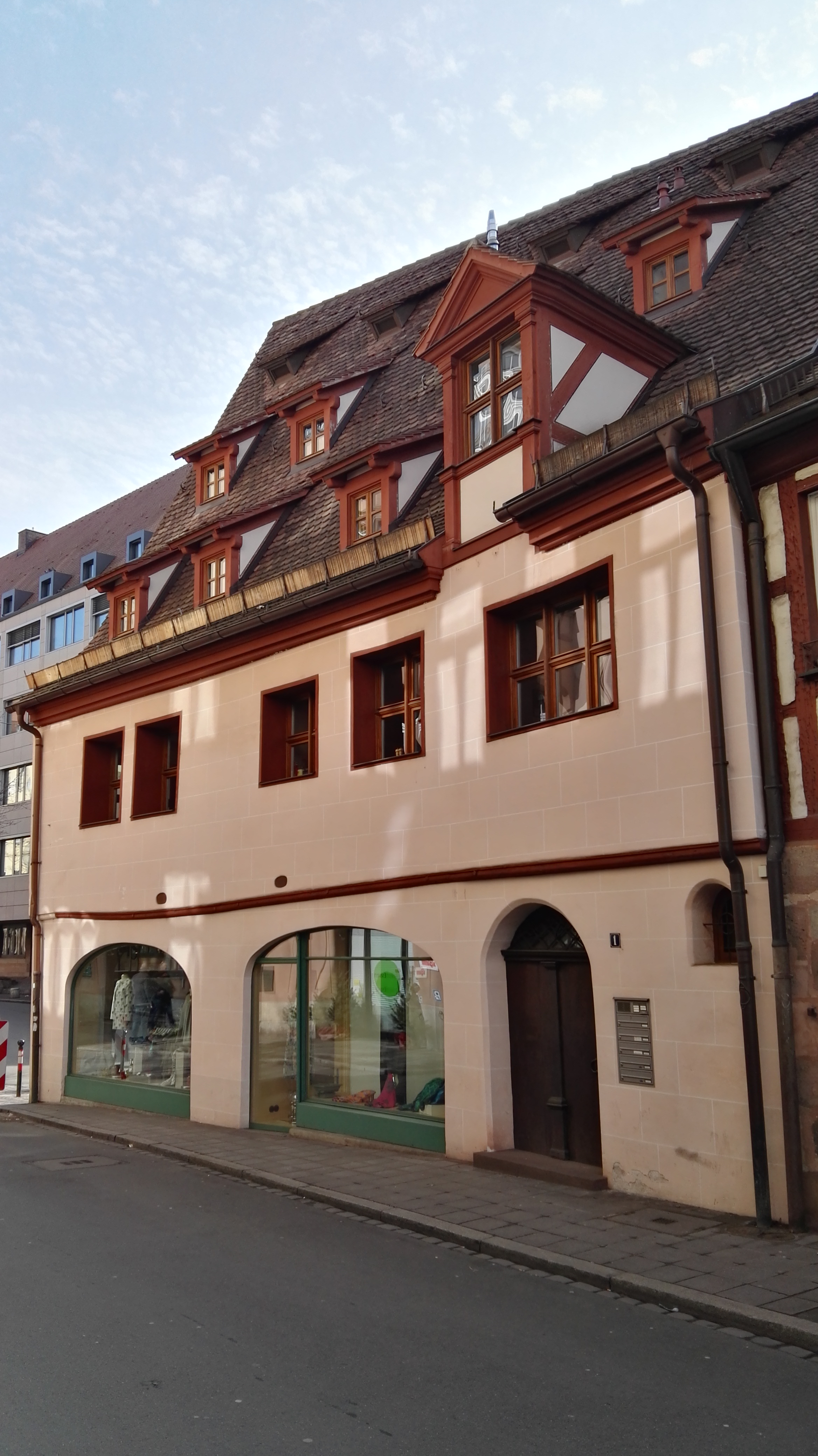
The restored former Bath house, Irrerstraße 1, Nuremberg

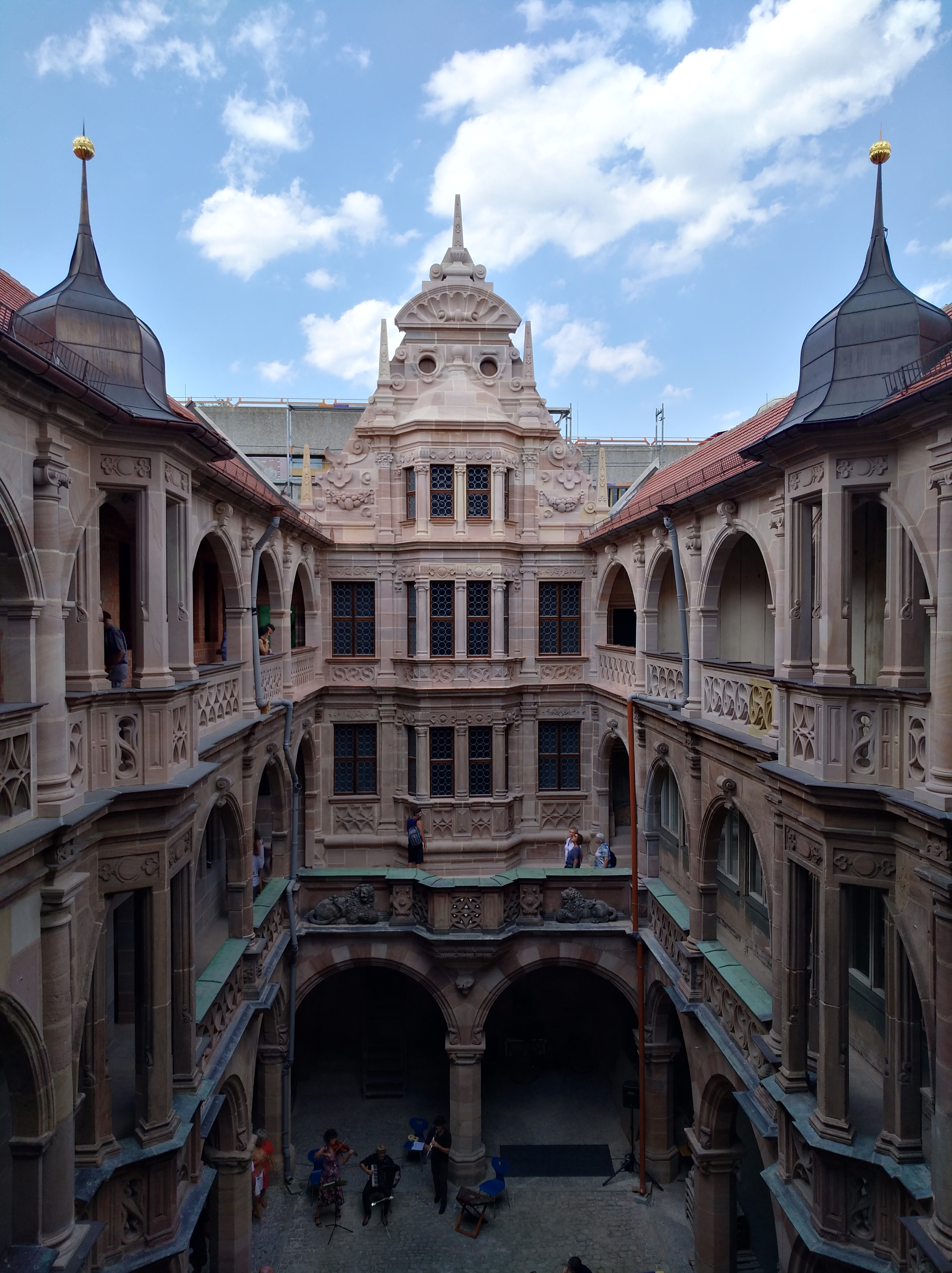
The almost finished Pellerhof Courtyard in July 2018

In 2005 the Old Town Friends renovated three medieval craftsmen's houses (German: Handwerkerhäuser) from the 15th century on Kühnertsgasse. Since autumn 2011, the Old Town Friends have operated a museum in these buildings.

The Old Town Friends have done much work in restoring houses, especially in the street 'Weißgerbergasse'. This street has around twenty medieval half-timbered houses that survived the heavy air raids on Nuremberg. The old friends have helped renovate several houses on that street.

In 1997 the Old Town Friends bought the corner house Irrerstrasse 1, a former bath house from 1509. The house forms the entrance to Weißgerbergasse. From 2004 - 2007 the Old Town Friends repaired the former bath house and restored the roof structure based on the historical model by removing its emergency post-war roof.

Likewise, the Old Town Friends bought the historic former tanner's house at Weißgerbergasse 10 in 2000 and renovated it at the cost of 1.5 million euros. They have since set up their office there. At the end of 2006 the Old Town Friends restored the roof bay on the house at Weißgerbergasse 8.

In 2002, the Old Town Friends renovated an old barn in Zirkelschmiedsgasse.

=== Current projects ===
In 2018 the association carried out the reconstruction of the inner courtyard of the renaissance era townhouse The Pellerhaus. The courtyard was completed in 2018 by raising 5 million euros through donations and with their own funds. The organisation is still pushing to reconstruct the complete building and the discussion about this is ongoing.

The old town friends are also committed to moving the Neptune Fountain back to the main market.

The association has recently reconstructed a former tanner's house from the 17th century called Hintere Ledergasse 43. The house burned in WW2 and had an emergency post war roof. It was near collapse and was scheduled for demolition in 2002, but the old town friends came as an investor and saved the house. They reconstructed much of the house and courtyard to the original 17th century designs, especially the upper floors and roof. It was completed in spring 2021.

They are organising the restoration of the late gothic Pilatushaus from 1489 on the Tiergärtnertorplatz. It is considered a top priority by the organisation because it is at risk of collapse. It stands in a prominent position below the castle and is one of the city's most important architectural monuments. The chairman of the old town friends believes the renovation will cost about five million euros. The Old Town Friends gained ownership of the house in 2022 and will restore the house.

Photographs of buildings associated with the organisation

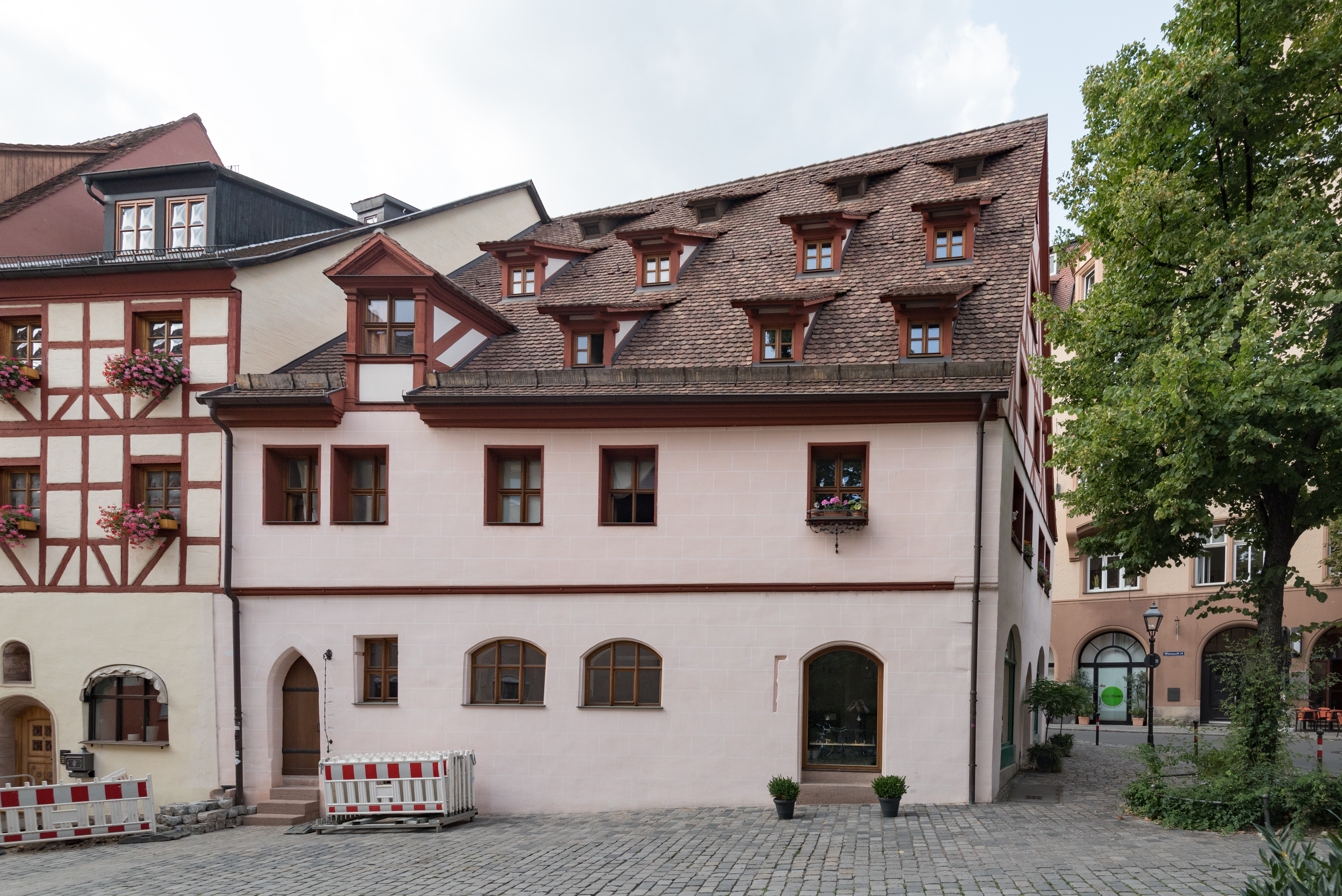
The former bathhouse on Irrerstrasse, Nuremberg

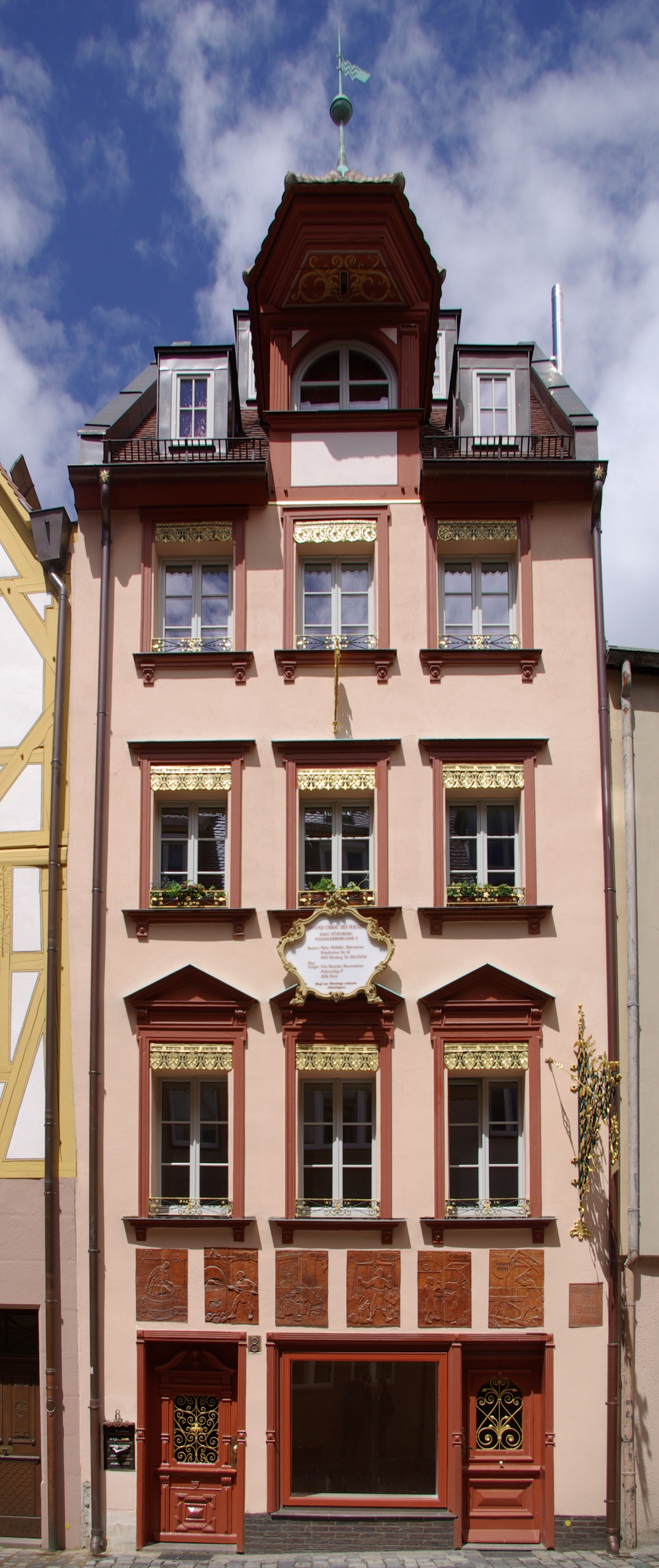
Weissgerbergasse 08, Nuremberg

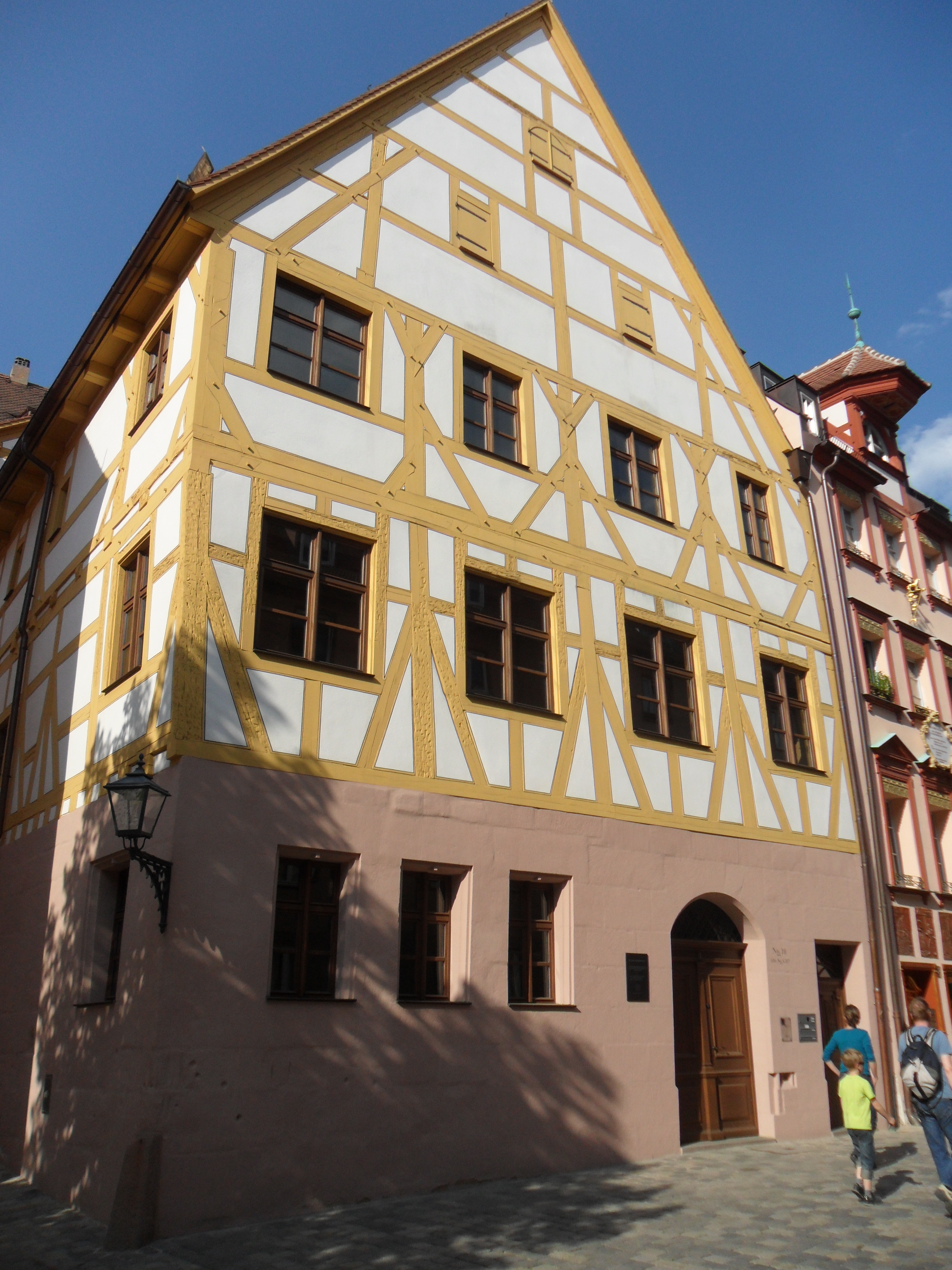
Weissgerbergasse 10, Nuremberg

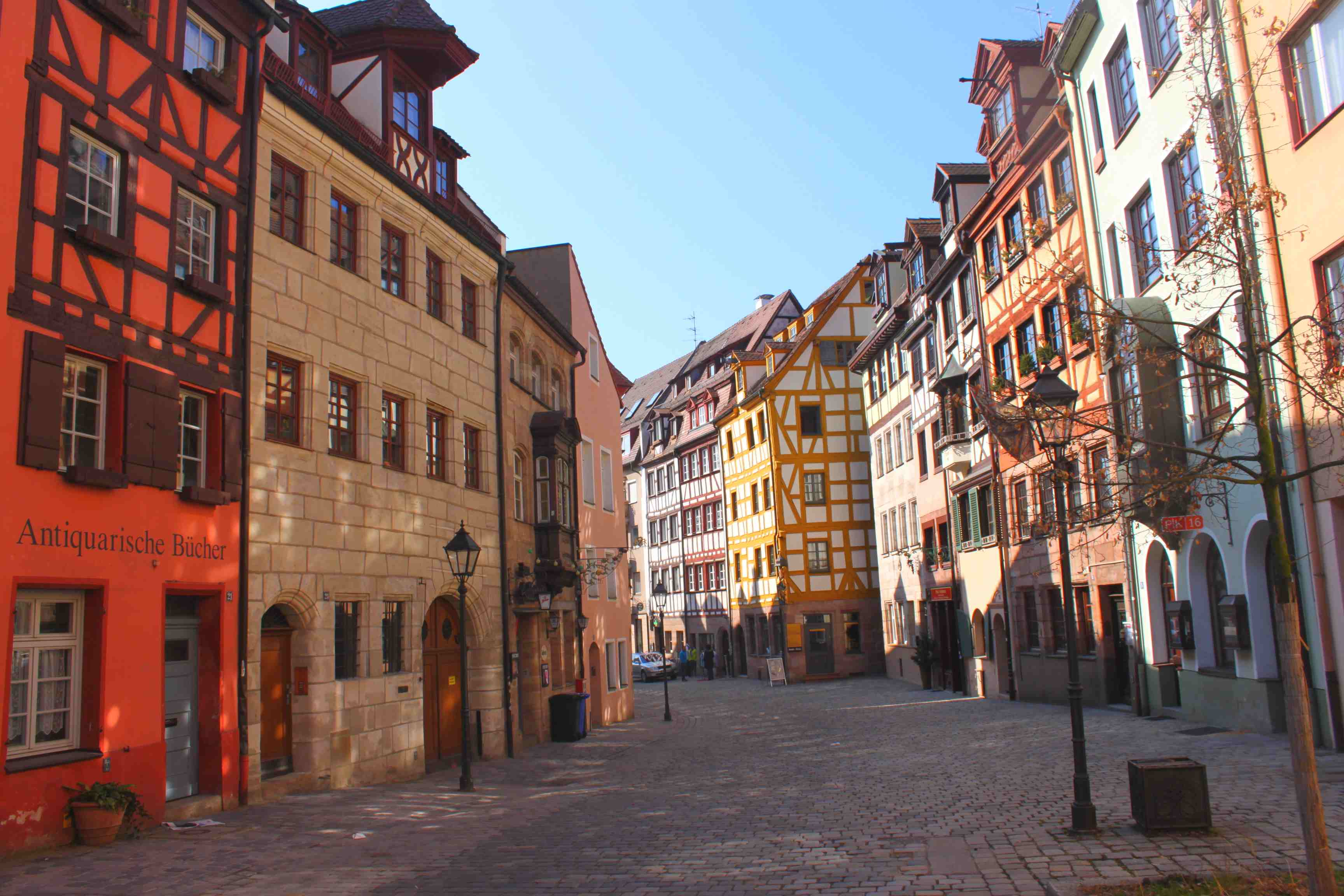
Weißgerbergasse, Nuremberg

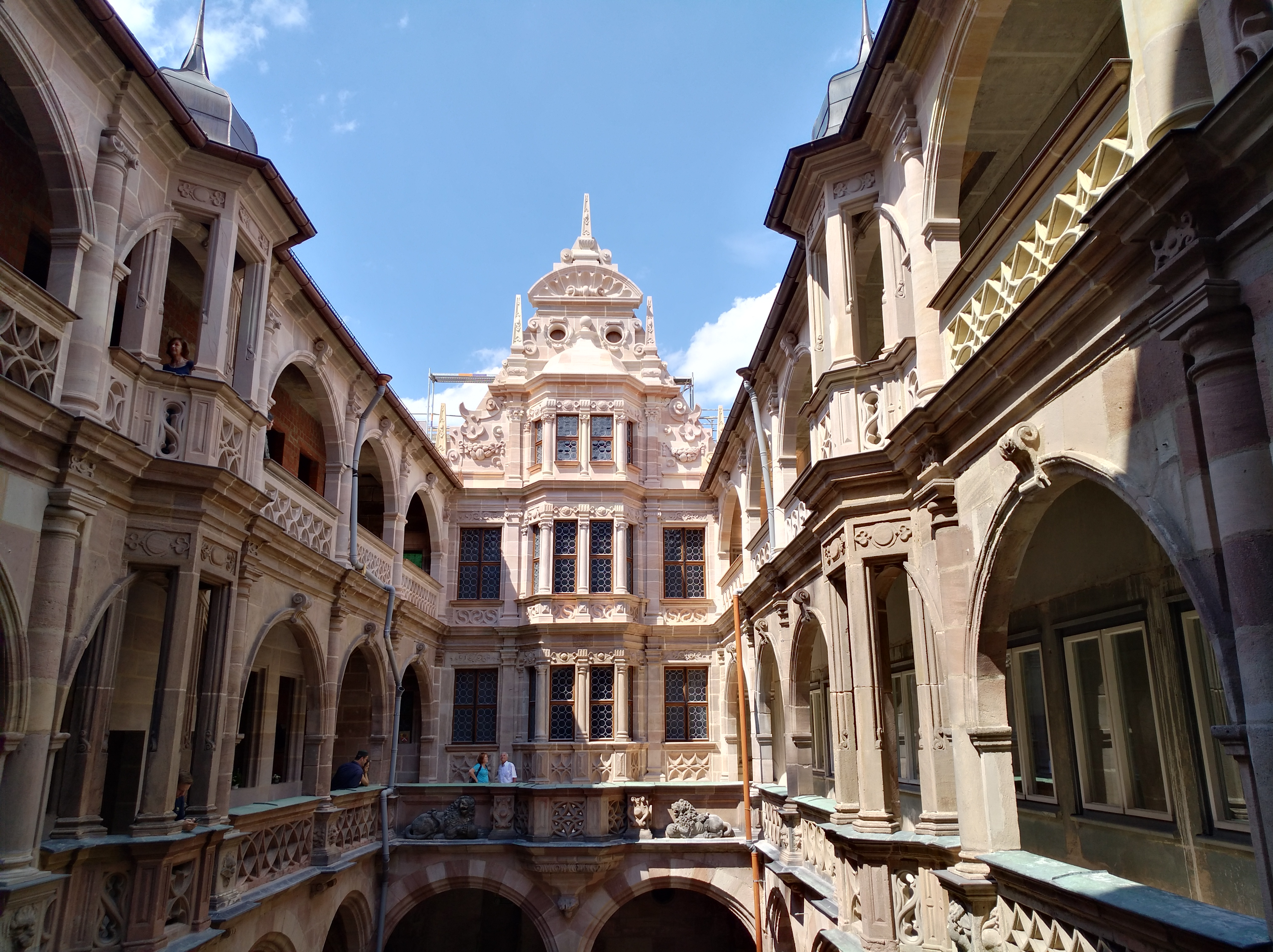
The recently reconstructed Pellerhof Courtyard

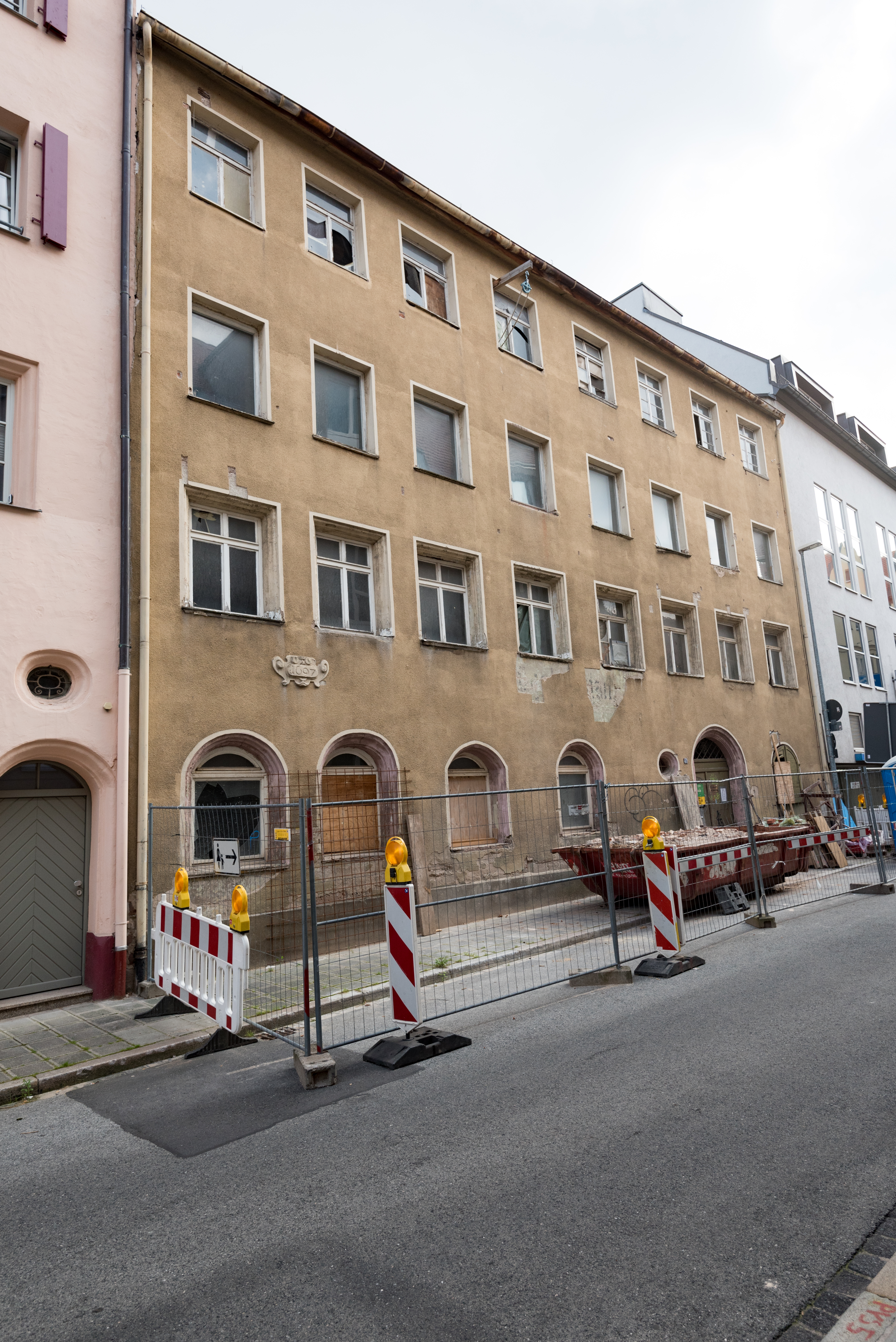
The 17th century former tanners house 'Hintere Ledergasse 43' before its restoration by the Old Town Friends

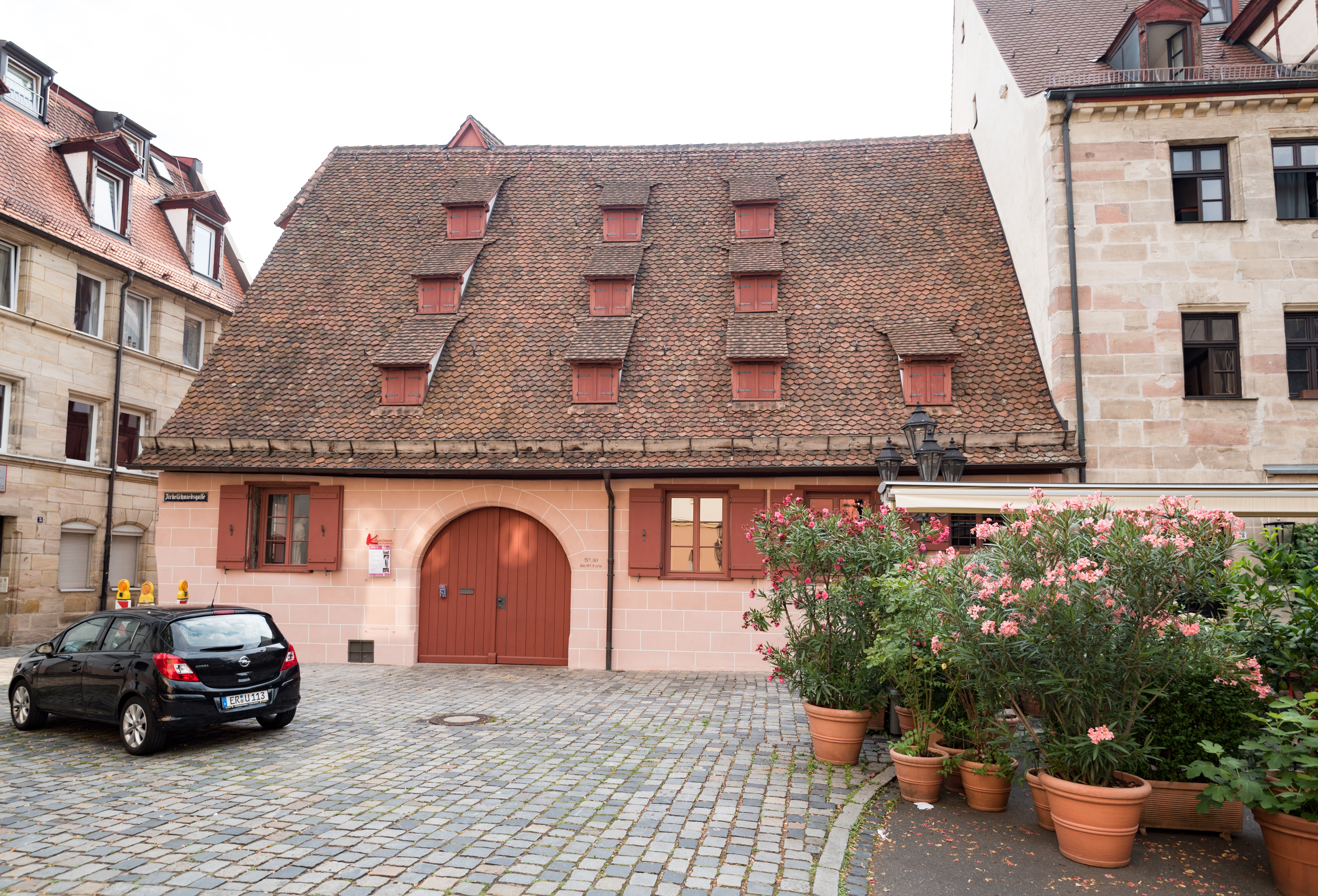
The restored barn Zirkelschmiedsgasse 30, Nuremberg

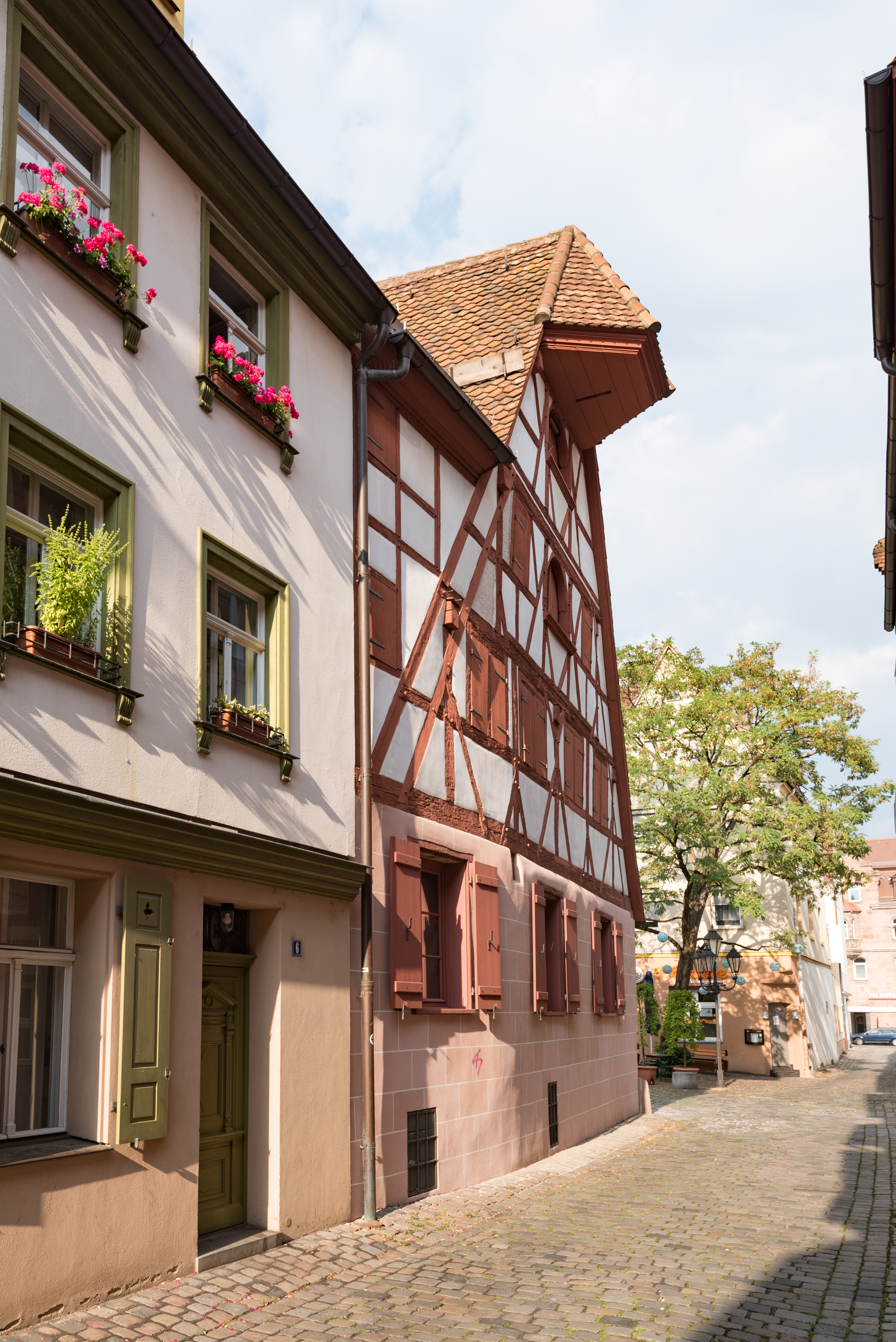
Facade of the restored barn Zirkelschmiedsgasse 30, Nuremberg

== Awards ==
- 1992 Prize of the Dr. Lorenz Tucher Foundation
- 2002 prize in the facade competition of the Sparkasse Nürnberg, second prize group (1,500 euros) for the half-timbered house Pfeifergasse 7
- 2002 Bavarian State Foundation Culture Award (25,000 euros)
- 2003 recognition (5,000 euros) for the town house Pfeifergasse 7 as part of the monument award of the Hypo-Kulturstiftung
- 2003 Award in the facade competition of the Sparkasse Nürnberg: Second place with 1,000 euros for the three-story house with gable in Mostgasse 9
- 2004 Bavarian developer award for urban renewal - vital inner city: recognition for Zirkelschmiedsgasse (Kulturscheune) and Pfeifergasse 7

== Literature ==
- Erich Mulzer (2000), Michael Diefenbacher, Rudolf Endres (ed.), Altstadtfreunde, Nuremberg City Lexicon (Stadtlexikon Nürnberg) (in German) (2nd, revised ed.), Nuremberg: W. Tümmels Verlag, pp. 66 f., ISBN 3-921590-69-8
- Altstadtfreunde Nürnberg e.V. (Ed.): Altstadtmacher - 30 years Altstadtfreunde Nürnberg, editor: Inge Lauterbach, text: Peter Fleischmann, photographs: Herbert Liedel, Bernd Telle, Günter Derleth. Nuremberg: Tümmels, 2003, 144 pp., ISBN 3-921590-06-X
- Nuremberg old town reports. Annual report and essays by Old Town Friends Nuremberg, ed. from the Altstadtfreunden Nürnberg e.V .; appears annually, No. 1 (1976), Nuremberg: Altstadtfreunde
- Wiltrud Fischer Pache: Nuremberg Old Town Reports. Ed. Von den Altstadtfreunden Nürnberg eV, No. 14 (1989) 88 pages, No. 15 (1990) 96 pages, No. 16 (1991) 96 pages, in: Mitteilungen des Verein für Geschichte der Stadt Nürnberg Volume 80, 1993, p. 273 - online
- Altstadtfreunde Nürnberg e. V. (2010), Kühnertsgasse 18-20 – A journey through the centuries (in German), Nürnberg
