= Pellerhaus =

Historic building in Nuremberg

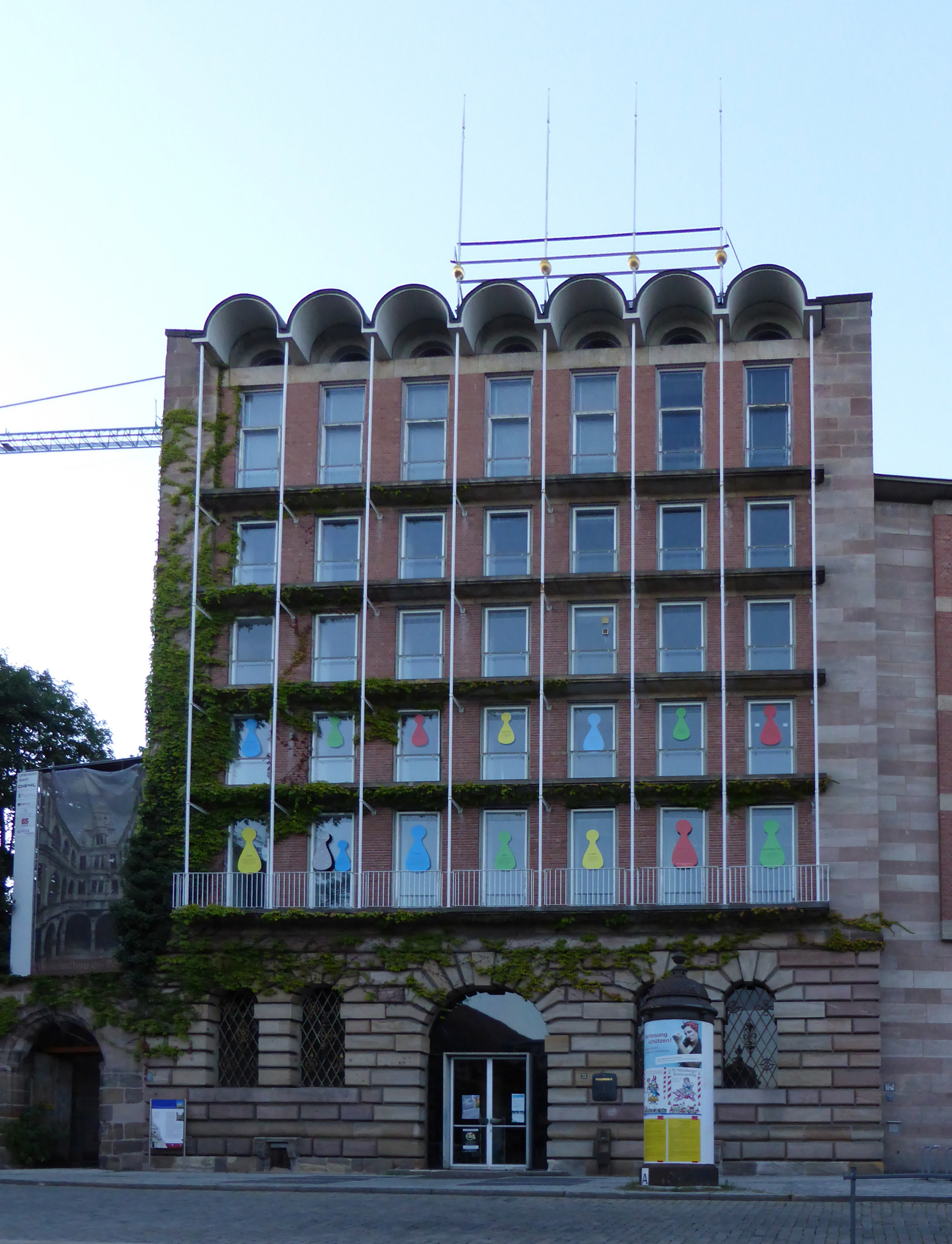
The current south facade, "Mayerhaus" from 1957 (photographed in 2013).

The Pellerhaus monument (referred to as Mayersches Pellerhaus in relation to the post-war building) is an archive and library building on Egidienplatz in Nuremberg's old city centre. It extends over the area of the historic Pellerhaus and the historic Imhoff house to the east of it, which was rebuilt after the war in the contemporary design of the late 1950s.

An important art and architectural Renaissance building stood here before its destruction in 1944 to 1945 during the bombing of Nuremberg in World War II. The ground floor and parts of the courtyard have been preserved and were integrated into the new building in 1955/1957. At that time, the funds for the complete reconstruction were lacking, but modern Mayer architects' building became an outstanding example of 1950s architecture and is part of Nuermbergs modern Cultural heritage since 1998. From 2008 to 2018, the courtyard was reconstructed through the initiative of the cultural organisation Old Town Friends Nuremberg (Altstadtfreunde Nürnberg) using donations. The Old Town Friends intend to reconstruct the entire Pellerhaus to its original design, but this is widely discussed as a controversial issue.

== Historic Pellerhaus ==
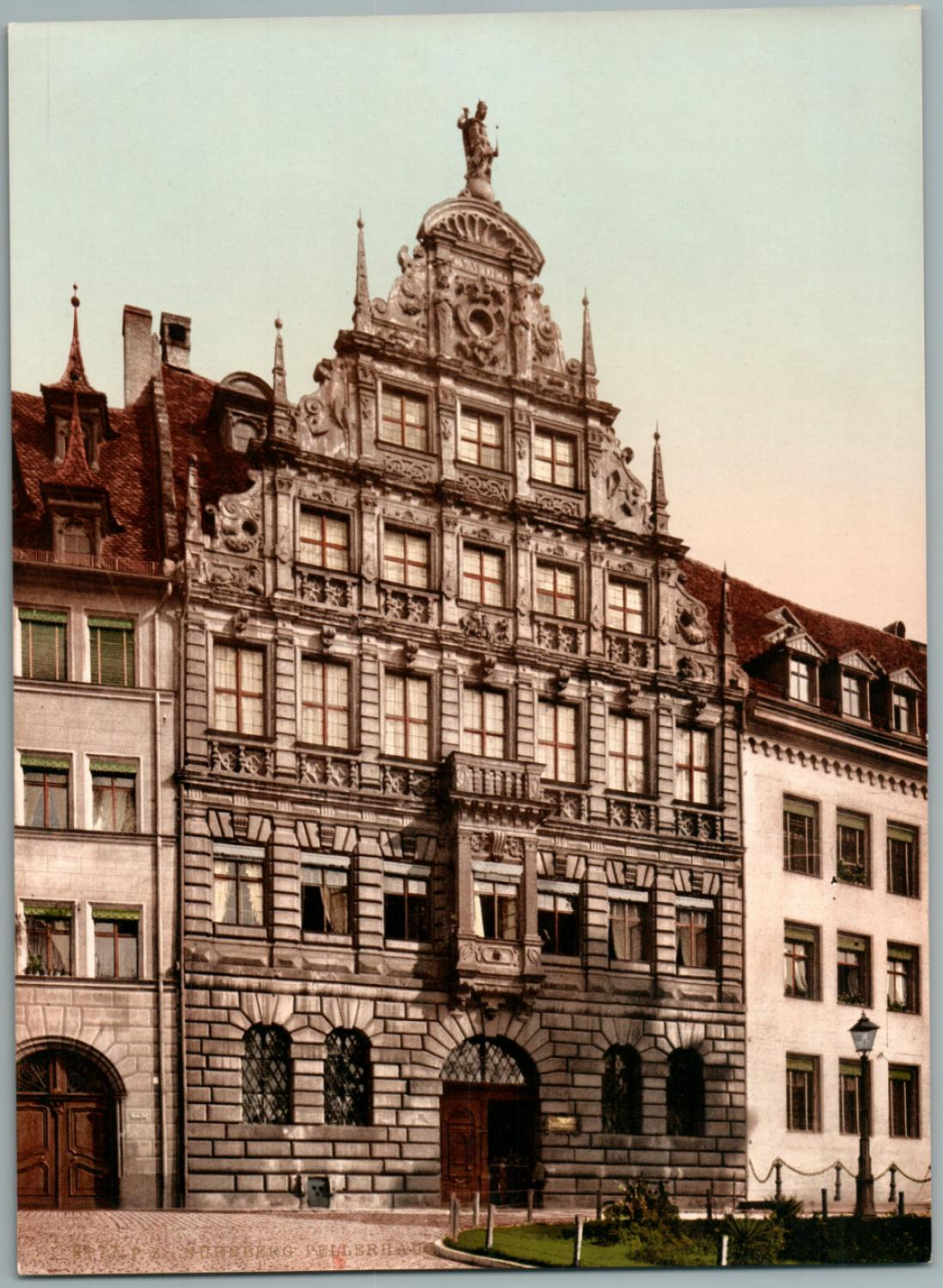
Historic Pellerhaus with its Renaissance facade, coloured photo around 1897

=== Architecture ===
The old Pellerhaus found its way into art history as an outstanding example of a town house from around 1600. Martin Peller had the house built from 1602 to 1605. Peller and his family moved into the house in 1625. He died there four years later. The Peller's family lived in the house until 1828.

The Pellerhaus was composed of a front building, courtyard and a rear building, a style typical of classic Nuremberg. However, the front building facade was an exceptionally complex form for Nuremberg. Instead of a reserved, eaves-like facade, as was customary in Nuremberg, it was more reminiscent of the trading houses of the North German or Hanseatic area.

Two stories and three attics rose above the base floor of rusticated pillow blocks. The seven window axes were flanked by pilasters that ended above the triangular gable in richly decorated obelisks. Up to the height of the eaves, the pilasters took over the rustic structure of the basement, above which they were covered with fittings. In the top of the gable, two hermen pilasters carried a shell with the chronogram "CVM Deo", which referred to the year 1605. The facade was completed with a Jupiter statue. Further accents on the central axis were a choir above the entrance portal, as well as a relief of St. Martin of Tourson the third floor, which alluded to the name of the owner Martin Peller.

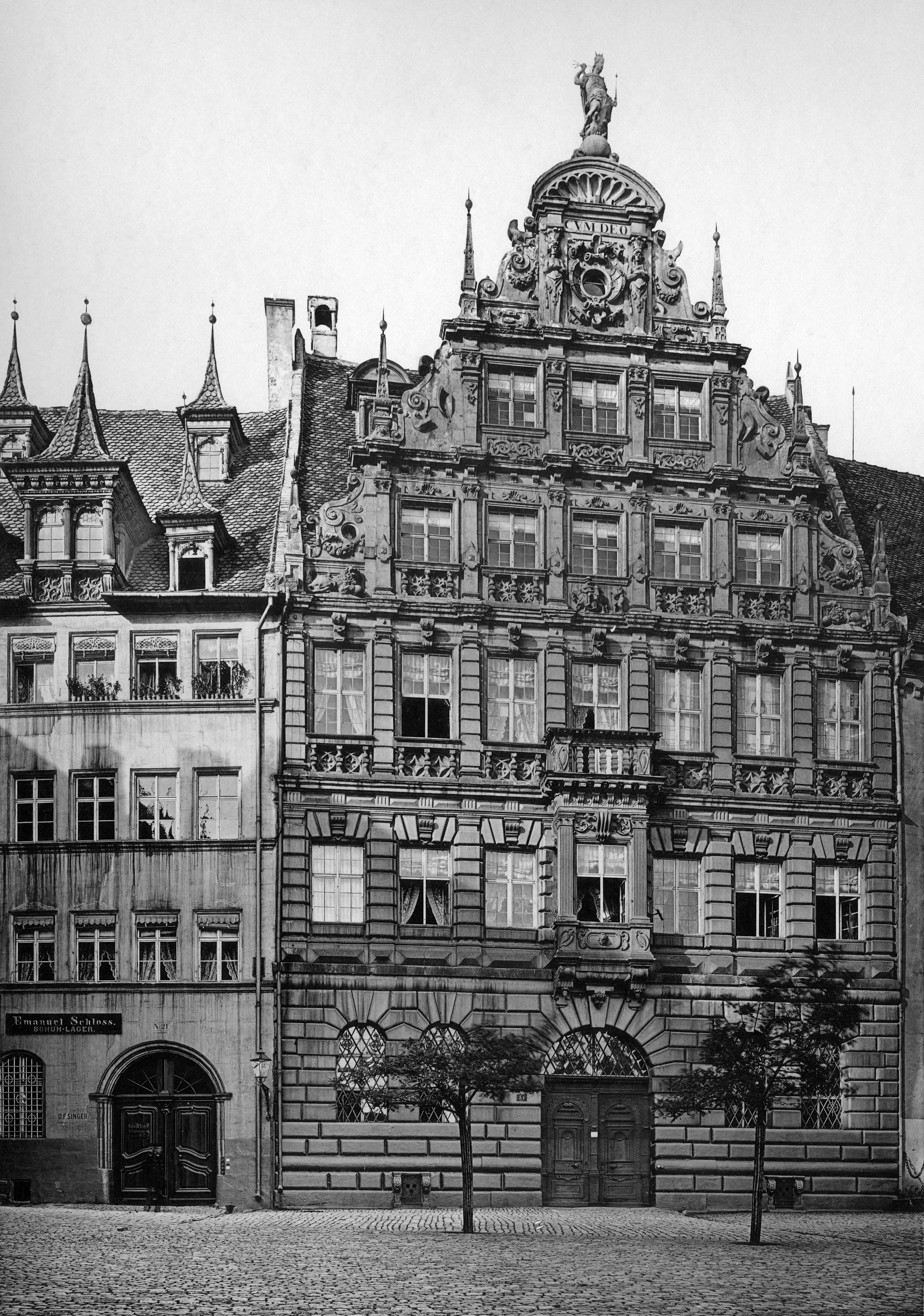
North view of the original Pellerhaus from Aegidienplatz, Nuremberg in 1891.

The courtyard had arcades that rose on octagonal pillars, with two gallery corridors above them. The rear building did not have a gallery on its facade. Instead, it had a striking bay window, which was supposed to take away the tube-like character of the narrow courtyard. The parapets were designed with Gothic-style tracery, with no repetitive ornamentation.

The interior of the Pellerhaus was also very elaborately decorated. The entrance hall is divided into nine roughly square yokes with Gothic ribbed vaults. In the so-called "beautiful room" the walls were lined with lavishly carved panelling, while the ceiling was decorated with ceiling paintings. The subject of the painting was Phaethon on the sun chariot surrounded by ancient figures of gods and allegorical figures. Another state hall also had a magnificent wall covering and a coffered ceiling.

The Pellerhaus was spared extensive conversions over the years and by the time of its destruction, was largely in its original state. In 1929, the city of Nuremberg bought the Pellerhaus from private ownership in order to use it as a city archive. In 1934, the Pellerhaus was completely restored by order of the city of Nuremberg.

== Destruction and reconstruction ==
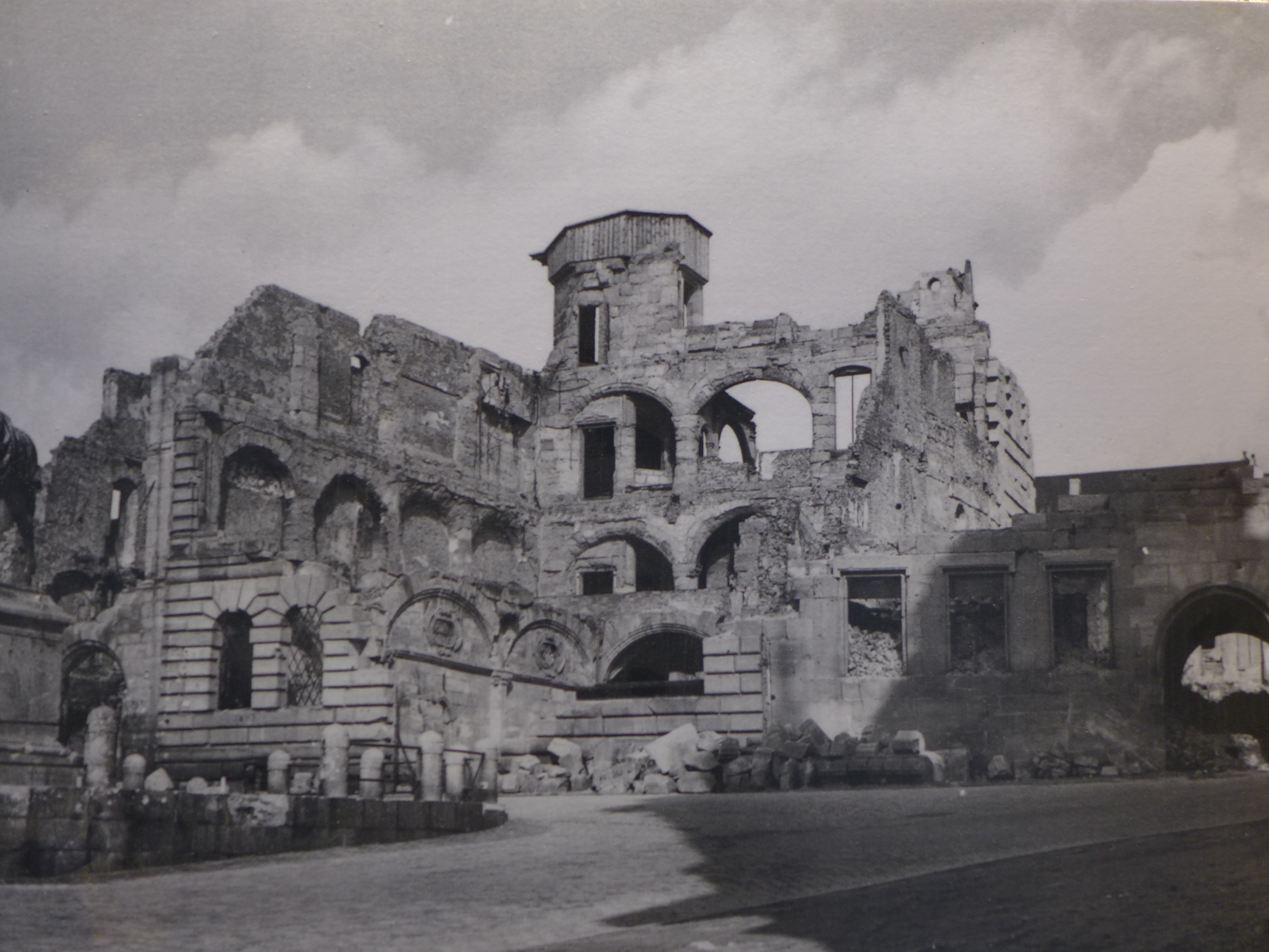
The ruins of the Pellerhaus in 1945

During an air raid on Nuremberg on October 3, 1944, the Pellerhaus was severely damaged by explosive devices and burned out completely when the Royal Air Force attacked on January 2, 1945. Large parts of the house collapsed on January 3, 1945. Part of the ground floor with the entrance hall, the stair tower, the cellar and large parts of the arcade courtyard have been preserved.

In 1952 the "Ideas Competition for the Reconstruction of Egidienplatz" was announced. The 1st prize of the competition was won by the Nuremberg architects Fritz and his son Walter Mayer. The design envisaged a complete development on the site in functional forms typical of the time. The remains of the old Pellerhaus were to be preserved and a contemporary magazine building was built on the partially reconstructed base floor, which was used to store archive materials.

After the drafts were drawn up in 1953 and various changes to the plan, the foundation stone was laid on April 7, 1956. On December 14, 1957, the building complex was inaugurated.

The reconstruction of the courtyard began in the spring of 1956, which also removed parts of the original Renaissance fabric. In 1960 the reconstruction was completed for the time being with the partial reconstruction of the courtyard arcades on the first floor. The building was put under monument protection in 1998.

Heinz Schmeißner, the Nuremberg city building council and head of the reconstruction of the city in the post-war period, later described it as a mistake that the Renaissance building of the Pellerhaus was not reconstructed. The renowned Frankfurt architecture critic Dieter Bartetzko stated: "The people of Nuremberg hated the rebuilt (1950's Mayersche) Pellerhaus, today they ignore it."

=== Historical reconstruction of the courtyard 2008–2018 ===
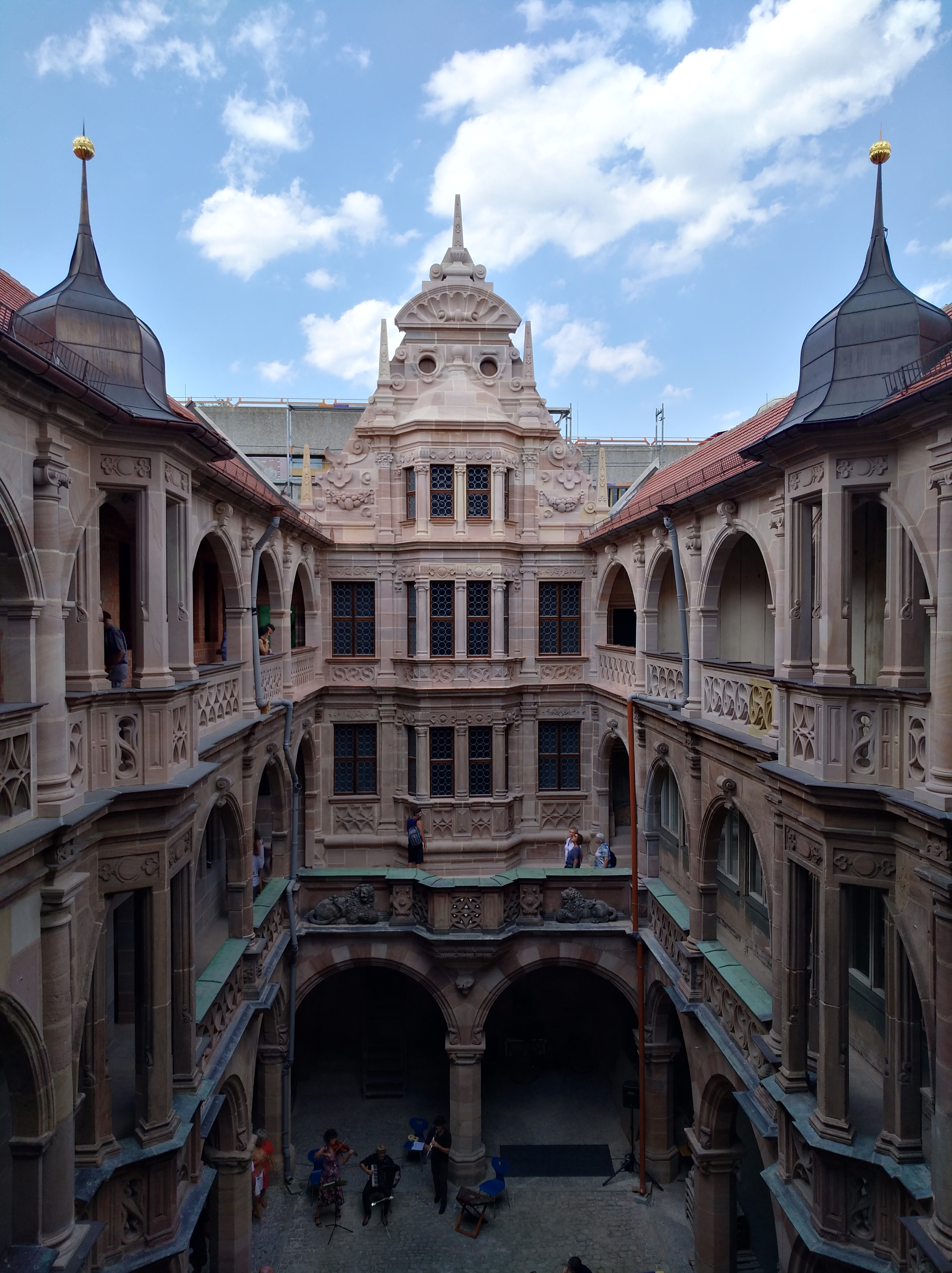
The almost finished Pellerhof Courtyard in July 2018.

In autumn 2005 an initiative was developed by the stonemason Harald Pollmann to rebuild the Pellerhaus courtyard. The 'Old Town Friends of Nuremberg' joined the project and founded the Pellerhaus working group. The monument protection authority was opposed to a reconstruction, since the existing historical substance would be endangered.

In May 2006, the city council fundamentally spoke in favour of a reconstruction, contrary to the monument protection office; but excluding financial participation in the reconstruction. The initiative then developed a fundraising concept.

In October 2008, the reconstruction of the courtyard was started. In mid-2013, the surrounding walls were completely rebuilt up to the second floor, and the reconstruction of the eastern arcades began. It was finished in 2018.

The 'Old Town Friends of Nuremberg' raised a total of 4.5 million euros by February 2018. The opening ceremony for the reconstructed interior courtyard was held on 14 July 2018. It has been open to the public since then.

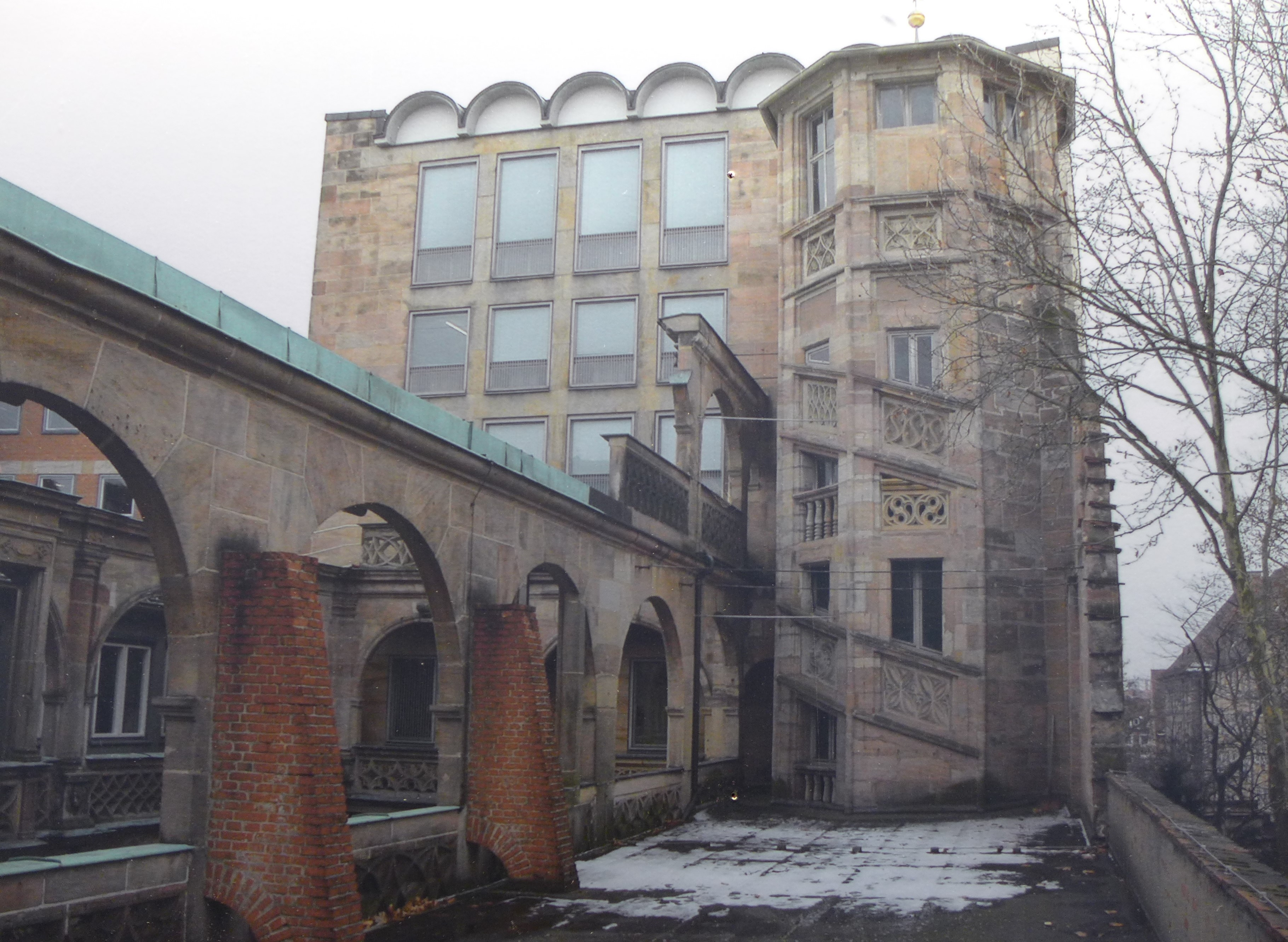
Rear view of the Mayer facade with the arcades in the courtyard before reconstruction

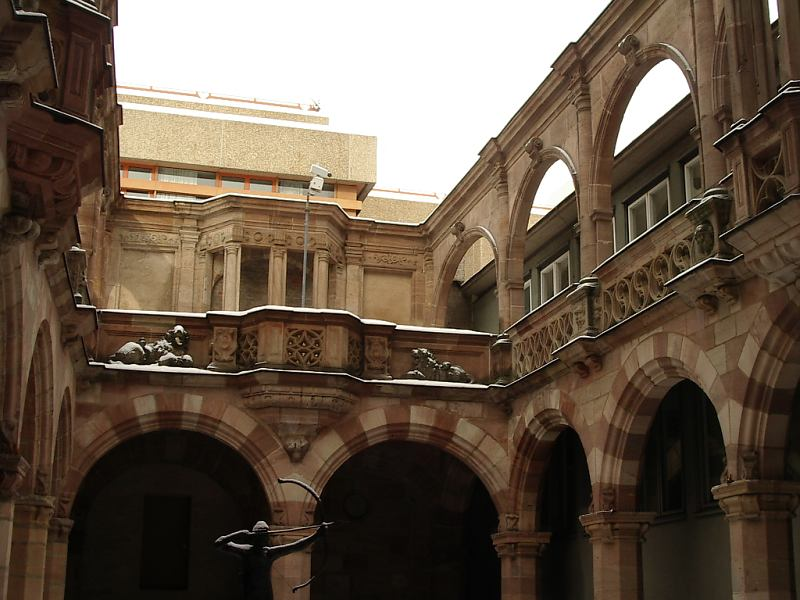
North view of the courtyard, 2004

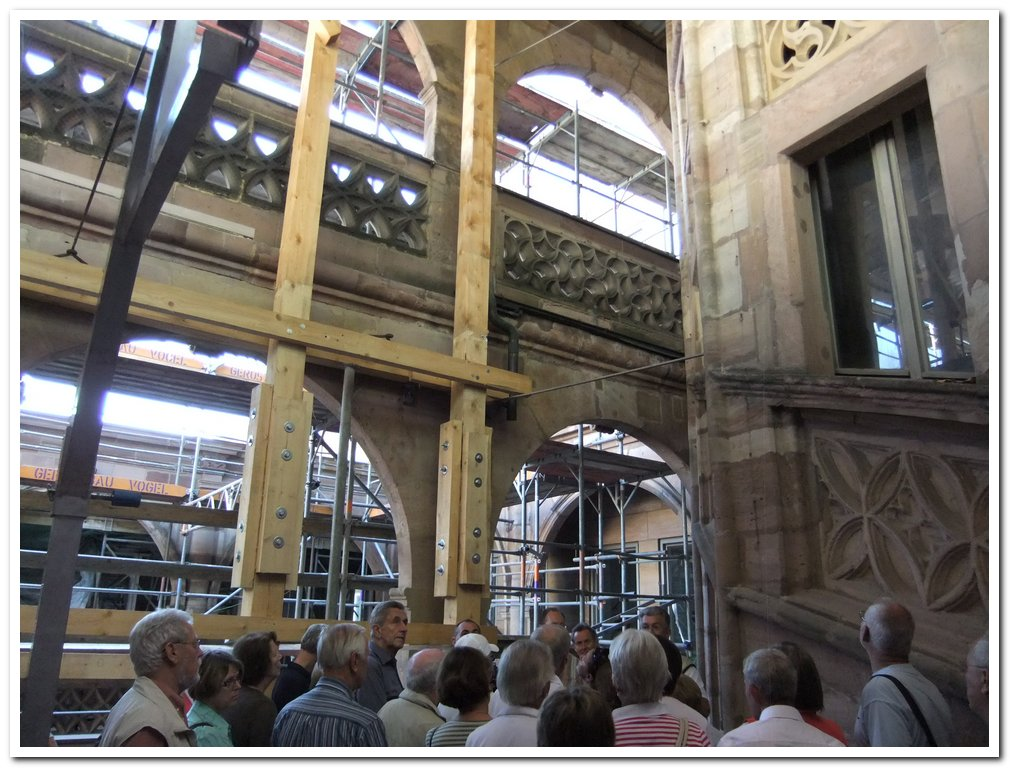
Construction status October 2011

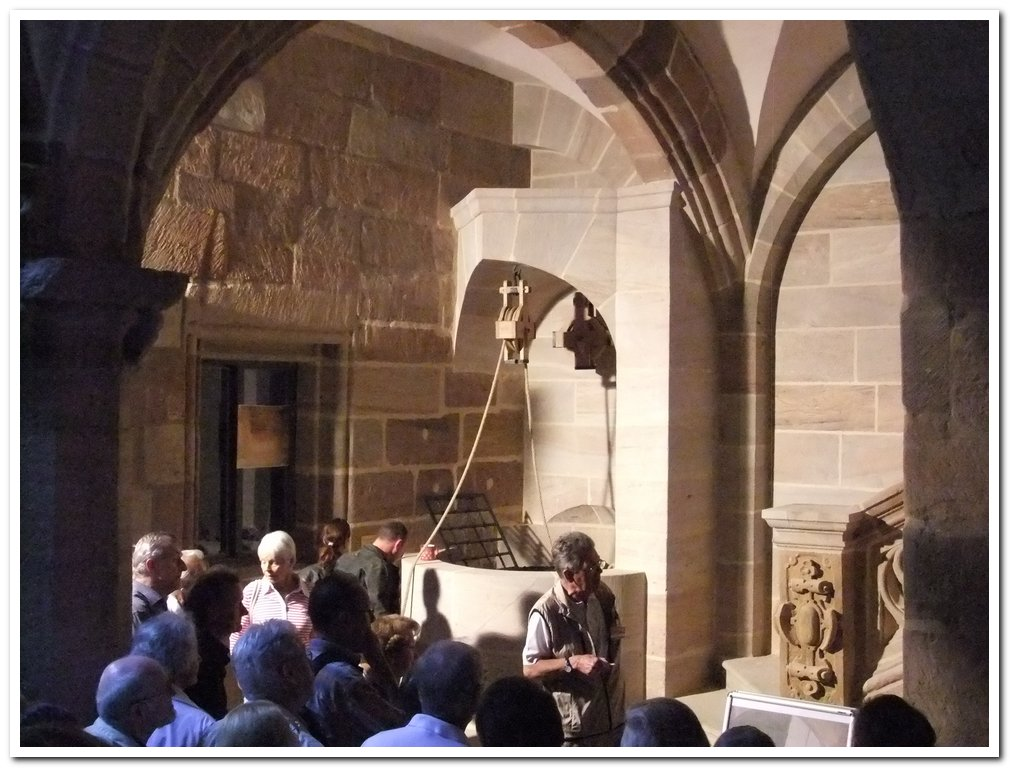
Reconstructed fountain in the Pellerhof

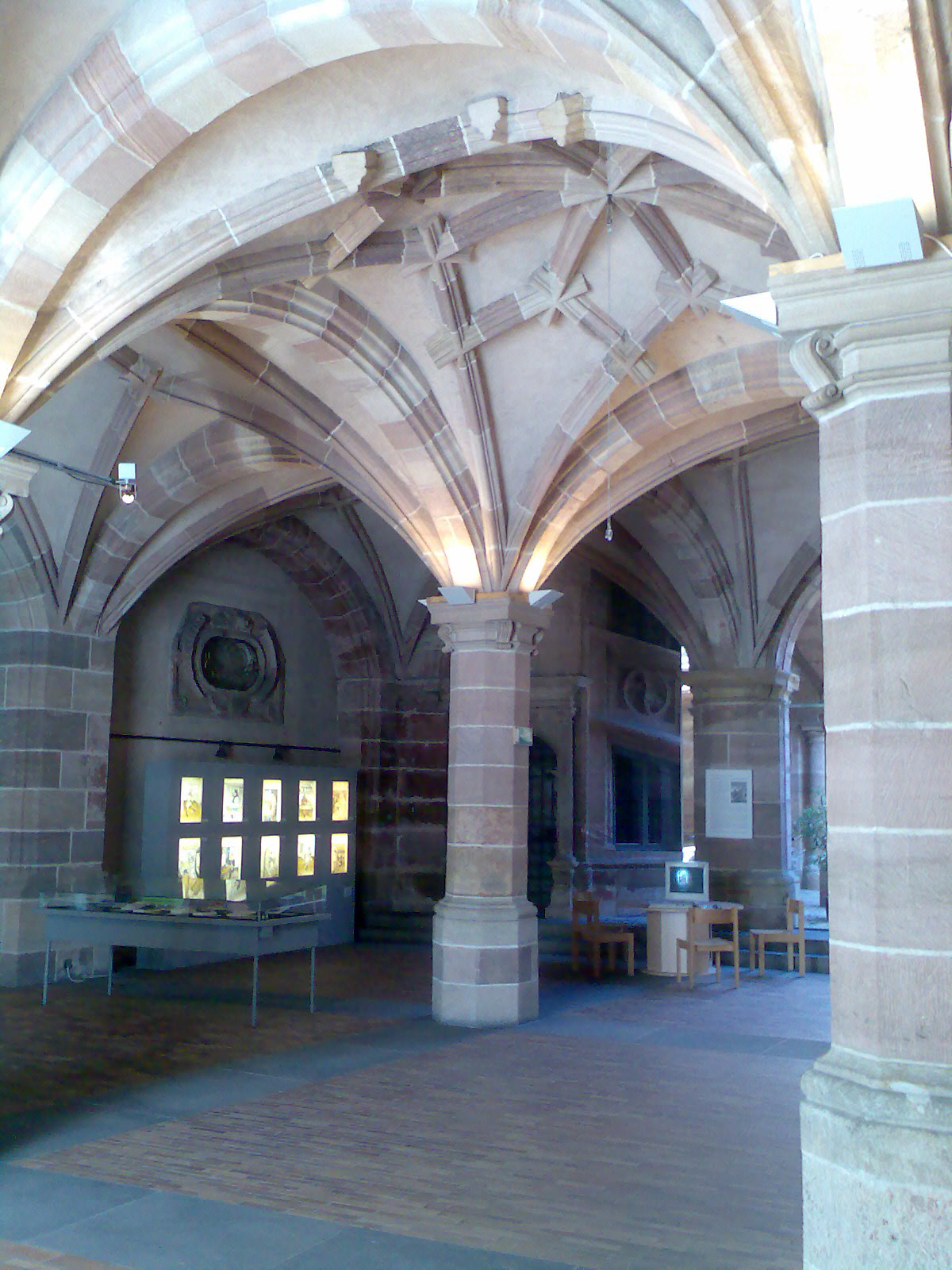
Entrance hall of the Pellerhaus

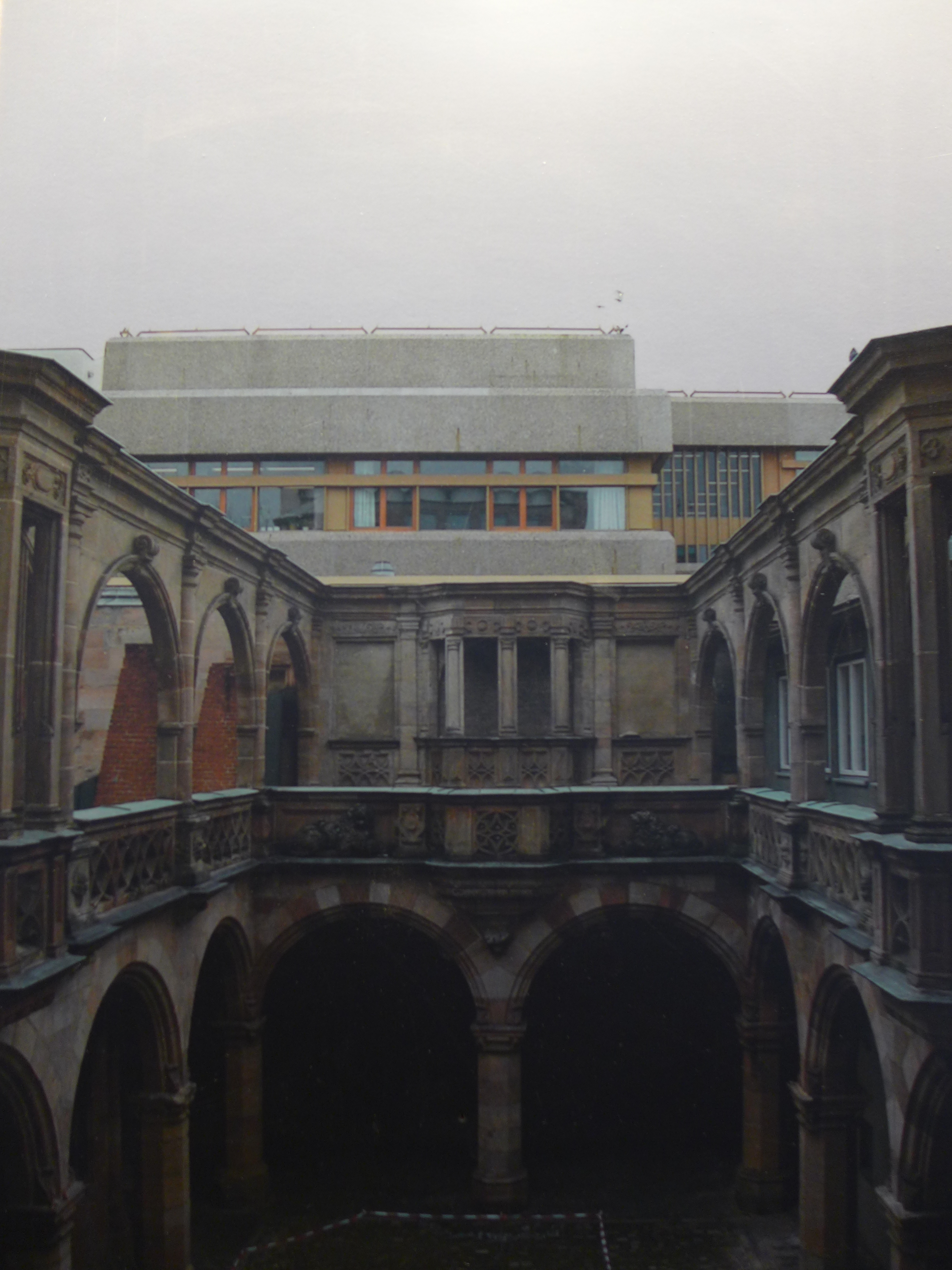
North facade before the reconstruction of the Pellerhof began

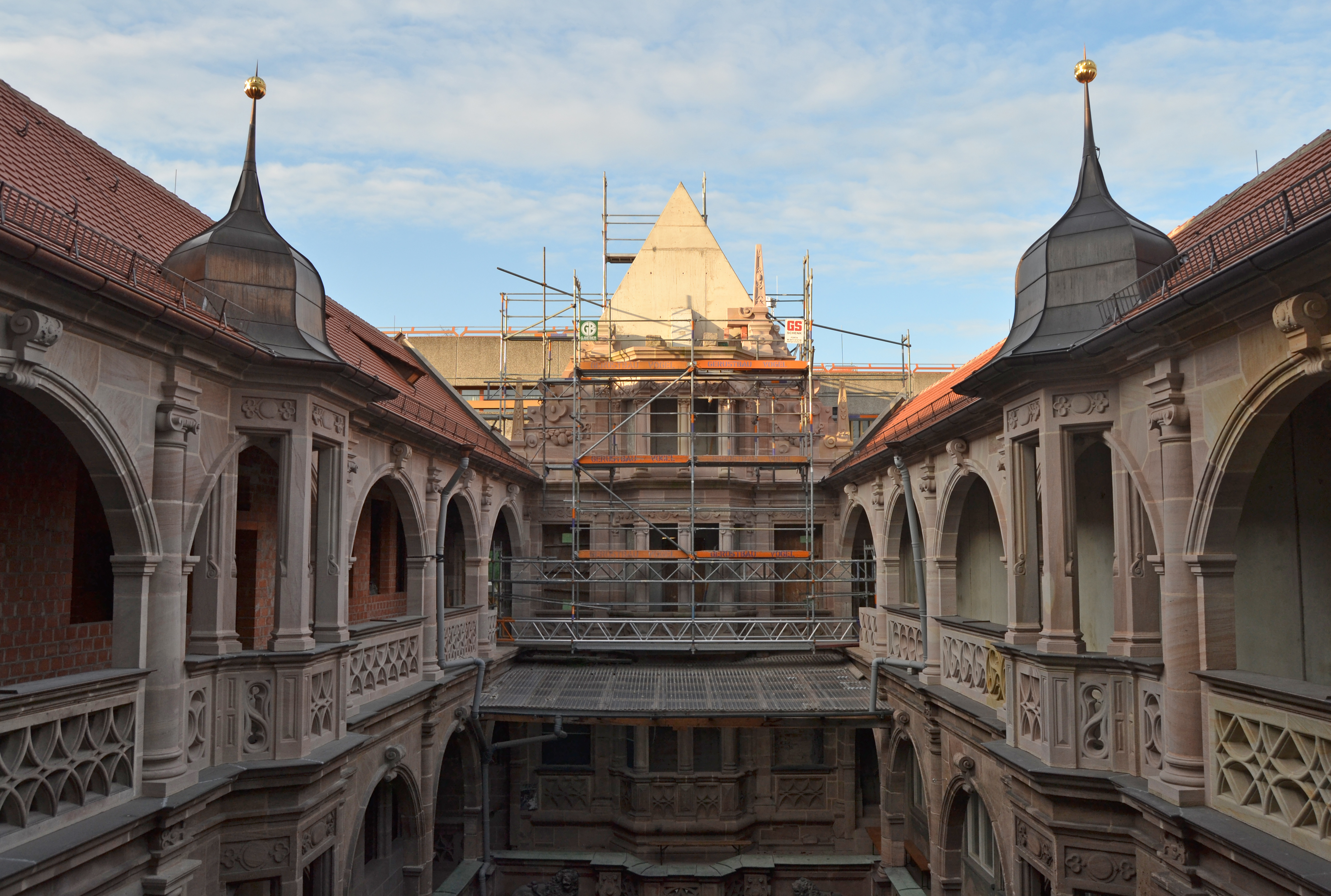
North facade in February 2018

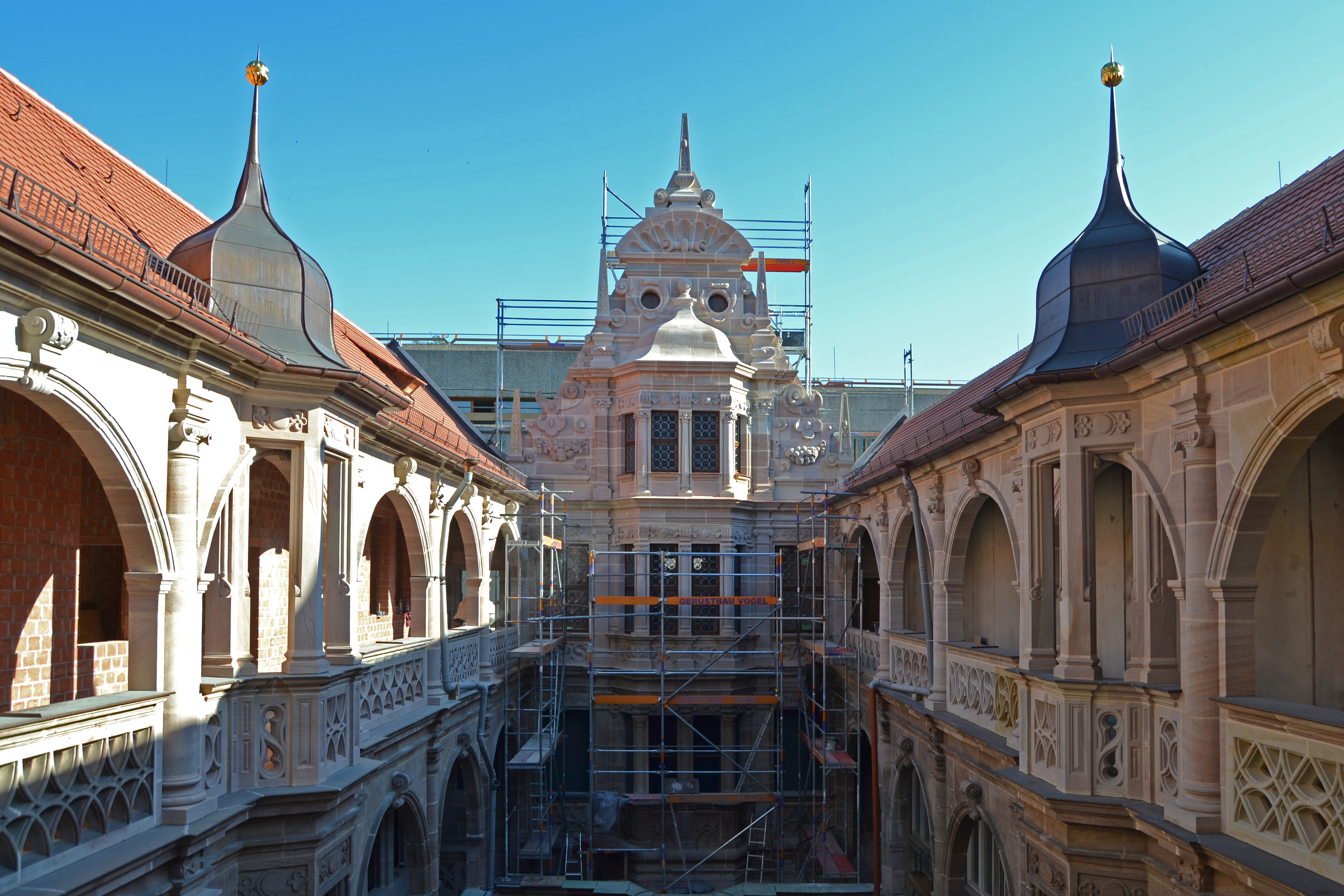
North facade in June 2018

=== Reconstruction of the main facade ===
The building complex from the 1950s is in need of renovation after more than 60 years. Experts, e.g. the cultural heritage authorities of Nuremberg, suggest a sensible reuse of the cultural heritage building, but in November 2018, the old town friends announced that they would like to take over the reconstruction of the entire Pellerhaus including the reconstruction of the Renaissance facades. This proposal is widely discussed in the city amidst much controversy.

== Gallery ==
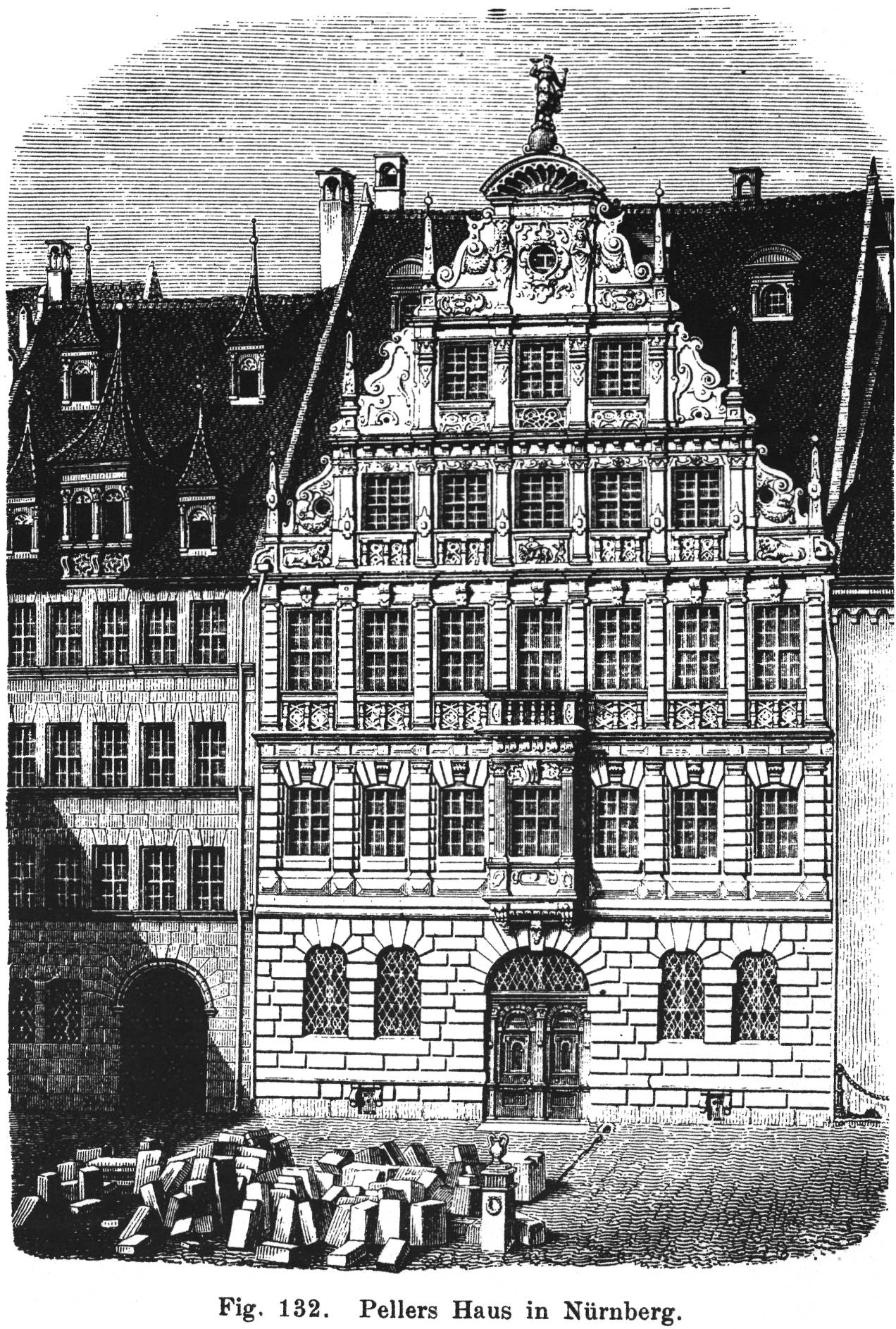
South facade (illustration in the real lexicon of the German antiquities 1885)

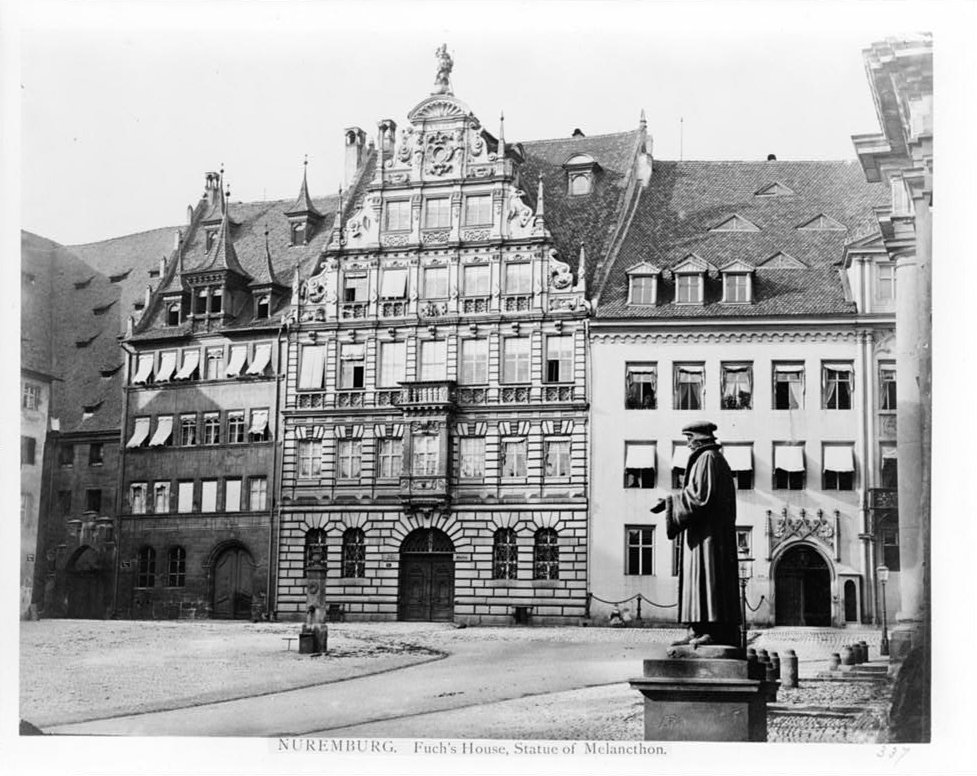
South facade and neighboring buildings on Aegidienplatz (on the left the Black Peller House), photo (1860–1890)

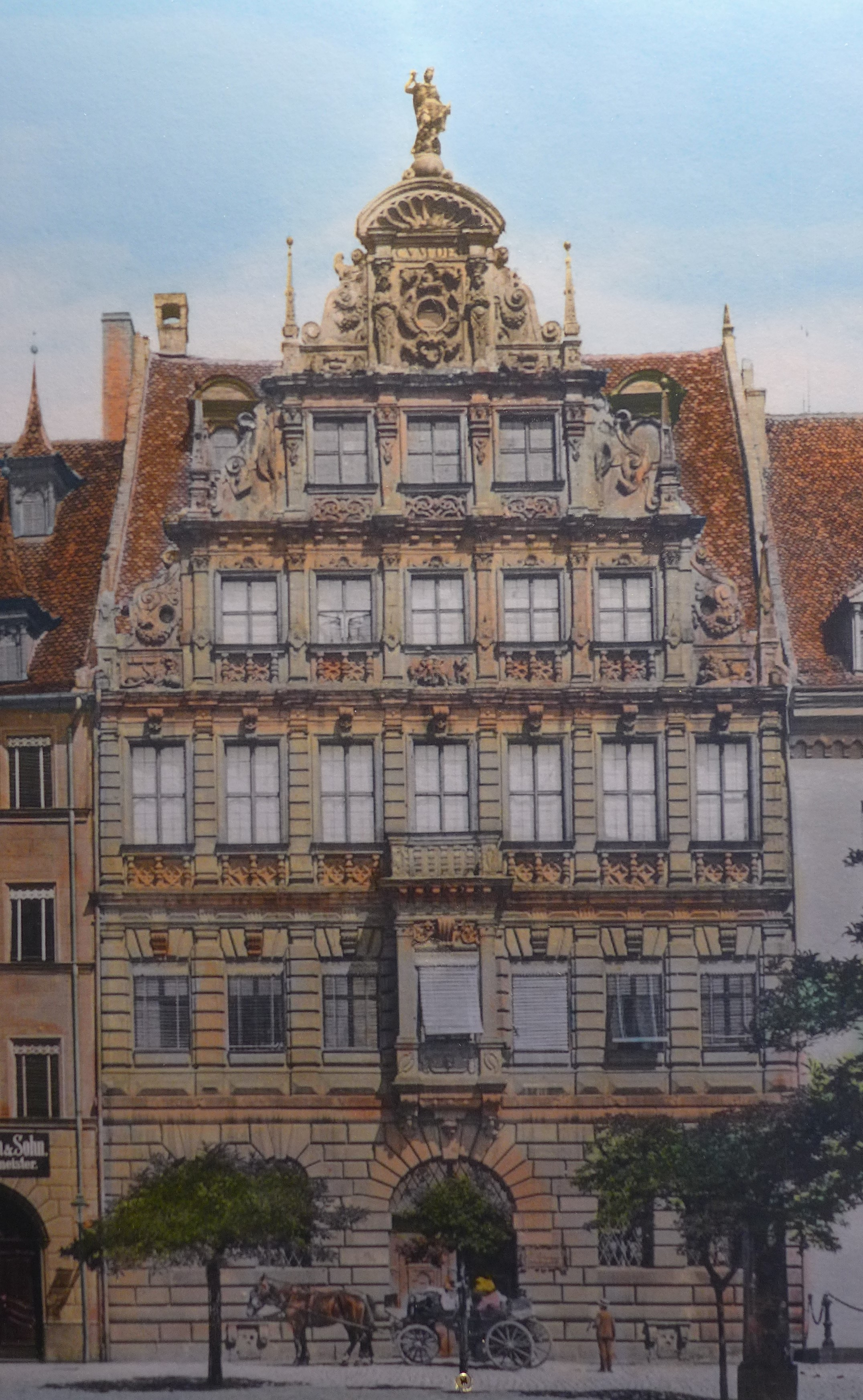
Coloured picture, late 19th century

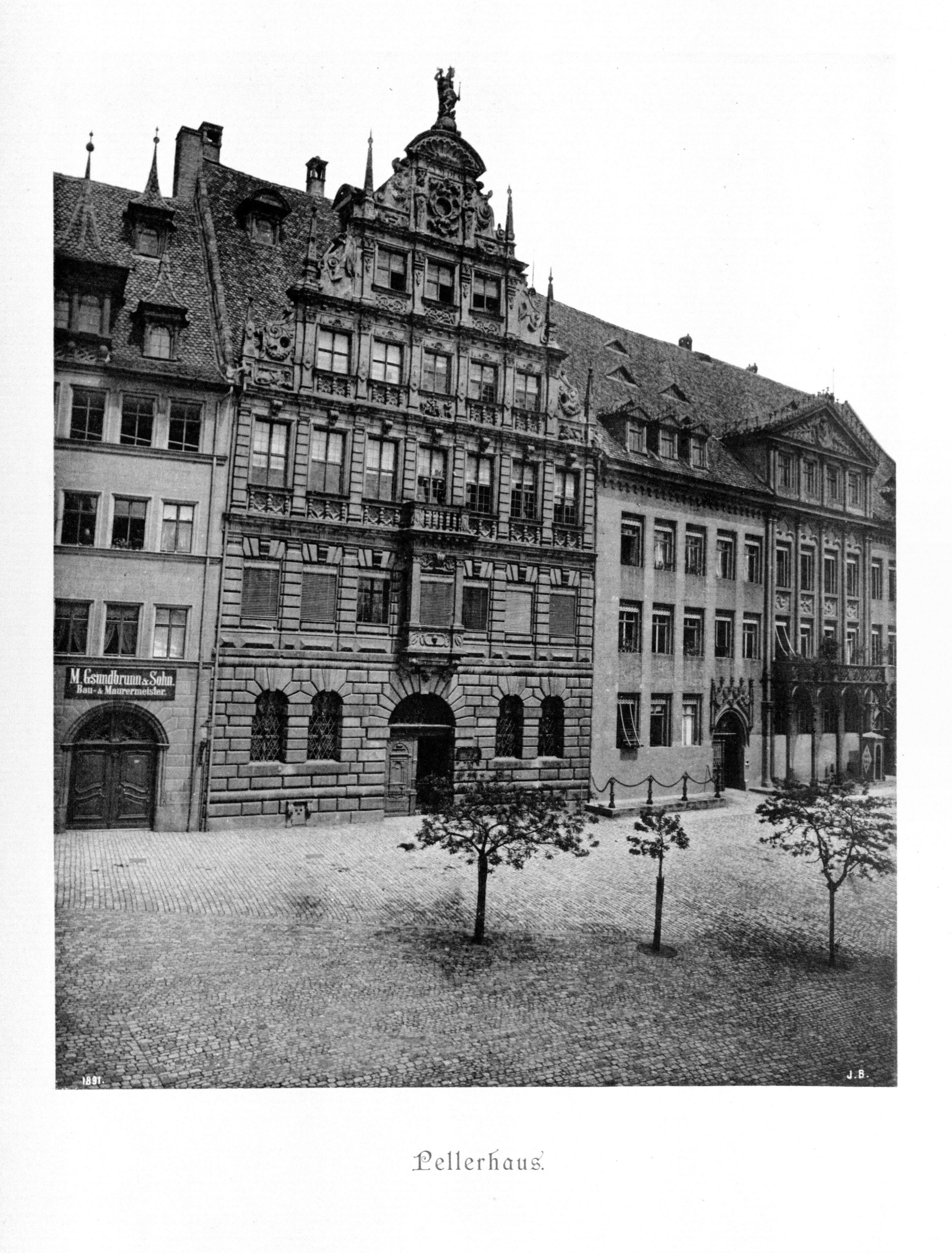
View from Aegidienplatz (1891)

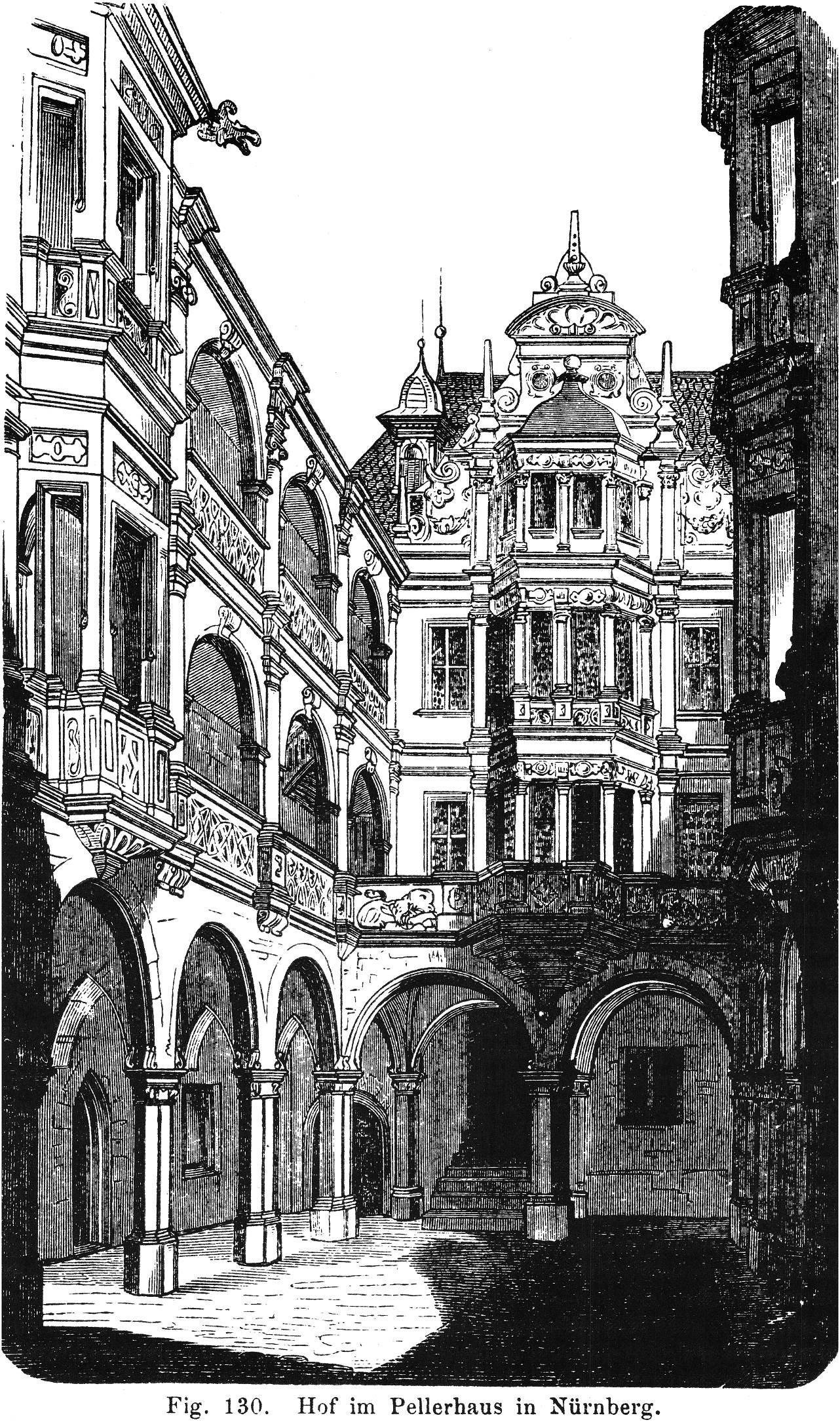
Courtyard, illustration (1885)

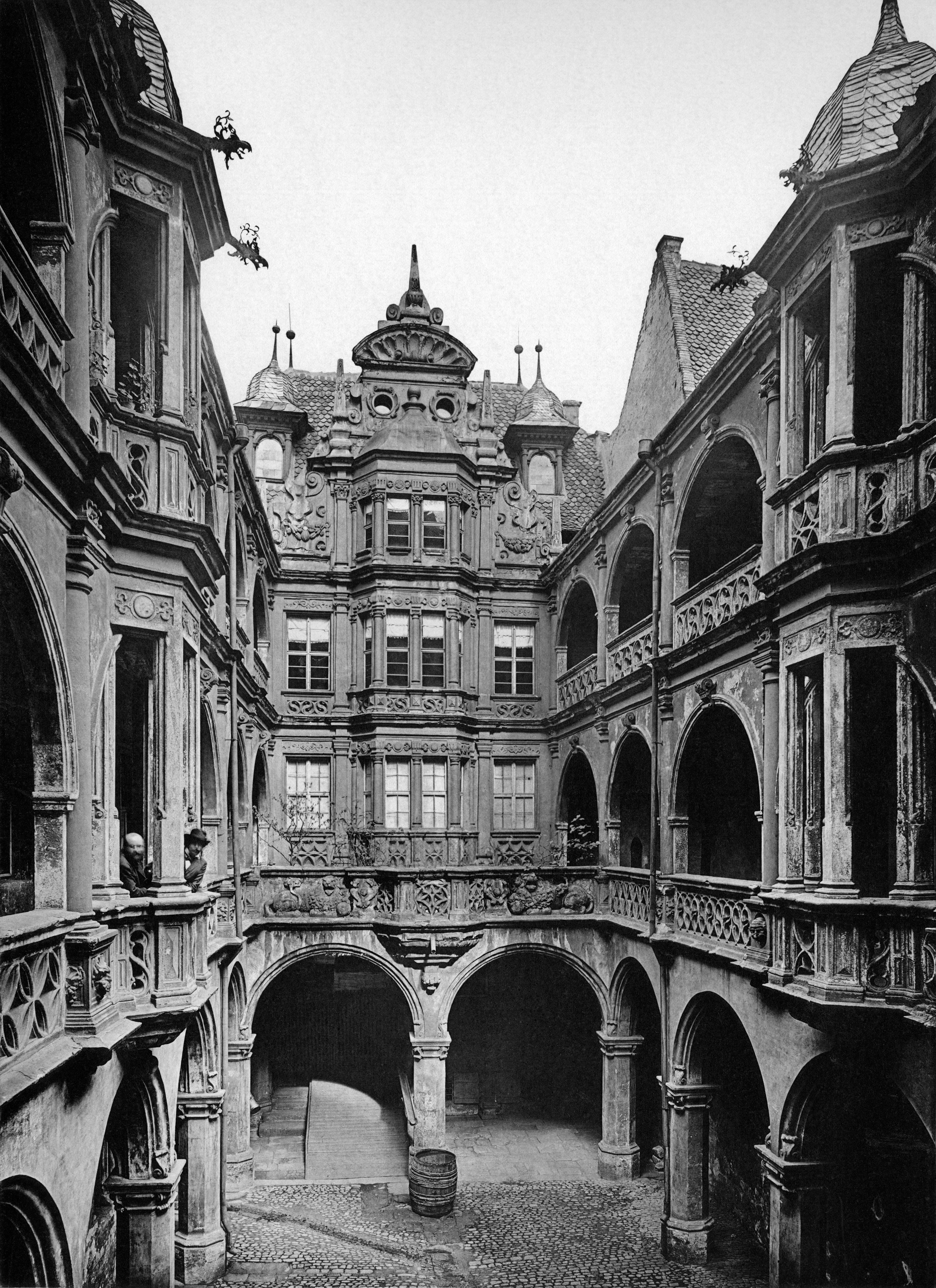
Courtyard, photo (1891)

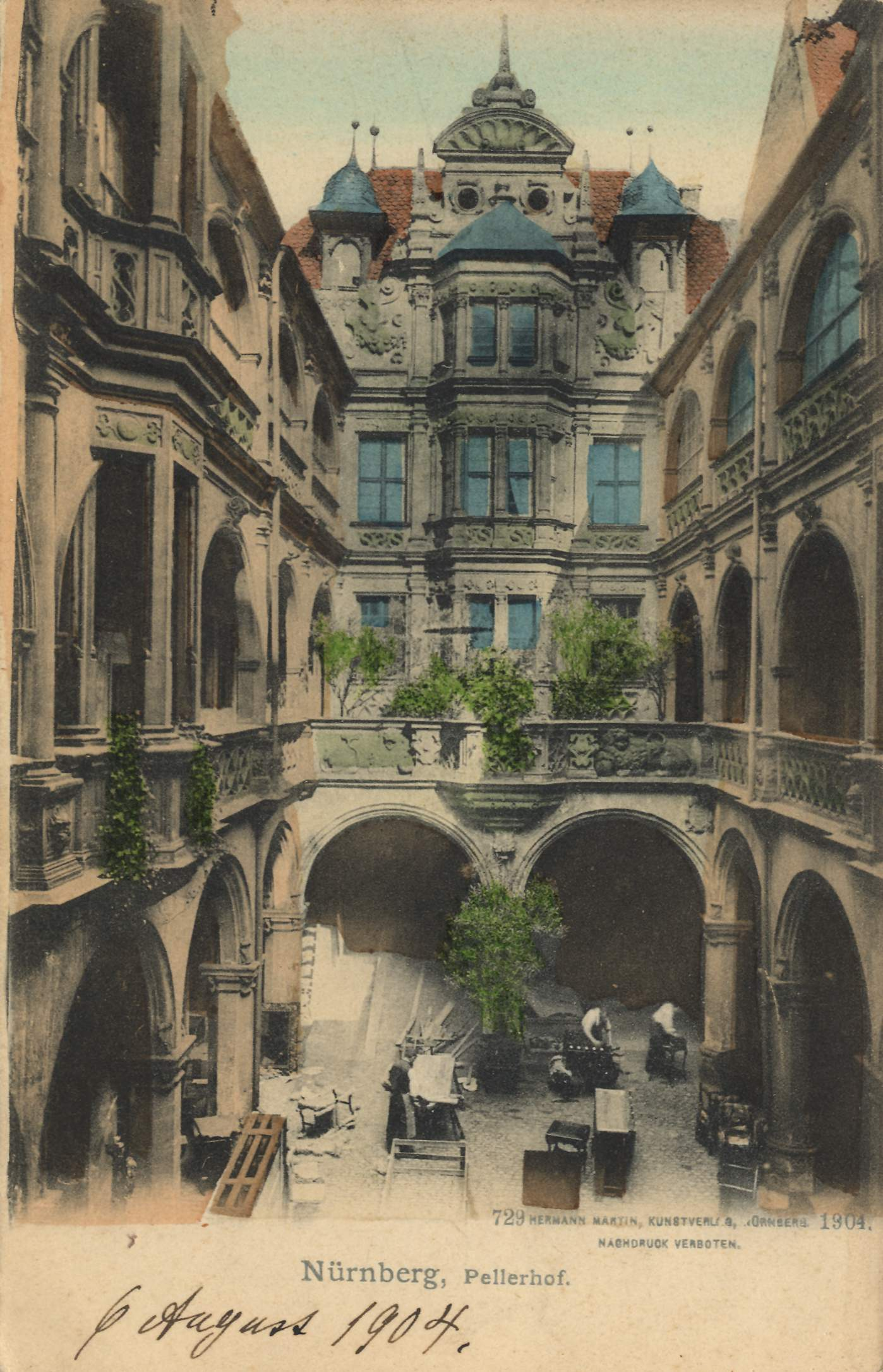
Courtyard, colored view (1904)

== Literature ==
In alphabetical order:

- Swetje Bolduan, Herbert May, Nikolaus Bencker, Harald Pollmann: "Pellerhaus Nürnberg", Nürnberg, 2009, Hrsg.: Matthias Böckel, Verlag Edition Hertel, ISBN 978-3-9812921-0-7
- Dieter Büchner: Das "Schöne Zimmer" aus dem Pellerhaus, Nürnberger Werkstücke zur Stadt- und Landesgeschichte, Band 55, Schriftenreihe des Stadtarchivs Nürnberg, Nürnberg 1965.
- Erich Mulzer: Nürnberger Bürgerhäuser. Nürnberg: Spindler, 1954, 68 S. (2. Auflage, 1964)
- Erich Mulzer: Das Egidienviertel und die östliche Altstadt. In: Erich Mulzer: Baedeker Nürnberg – Stadtführer, 9. Auflage. Von Karl Baedeker. Ostfildern-Kemnat: Baedeker, 2000, 134 S., ISBN 3-87954-024-1
- Reinhold Schaffer: Das Pellerhaus in Nürnberg. Nürnberg; Berlin: Ulrich, 1934.
- Gerhard Seibold: Die Viatis und Peller, Beiträge zur Geschichte ihrer Handelsgesellschaft, Köln u. Wien 1977.
- Ursula Tannert: Im November vor 55 Jahren war der Wiederaufbau des Pellerhauses schon einmal Thema. Aus Renaissancebau sollte Kulturzentrum werden. In: Nürnberger Zeitung Nr. 276 29 November 2007, Nürnberg plus, S. + 4 – online
- Ute Wolf: Altstadtfreunde zum Pellerhof: „Speerspitze für den Wiederaufbau", in: Nürnberger Zeitung Nr. 23, 28/29 January 2006, S. 9.
- Ute Wolf: Wiederaufbau des Pellerhofes: Eindeutiger Bürgerwille, NZ-Kommentar, in: Nürnberger Zeitung Nr. 23, 28/29 January 2006, S. 9.
- Josef Zimmermann: Martin Peller von Radolfzell und das Pellerhaus in Nürnberg, in: Schriften des Vereins für Geschichte des Bodensees und seiner Umgebung, 78. Jg. 1960, S. 110–113. (Digitalisat)
