= Craftsmen's houses (Nuremberg) =

Important architectural monuments of Nuremberg

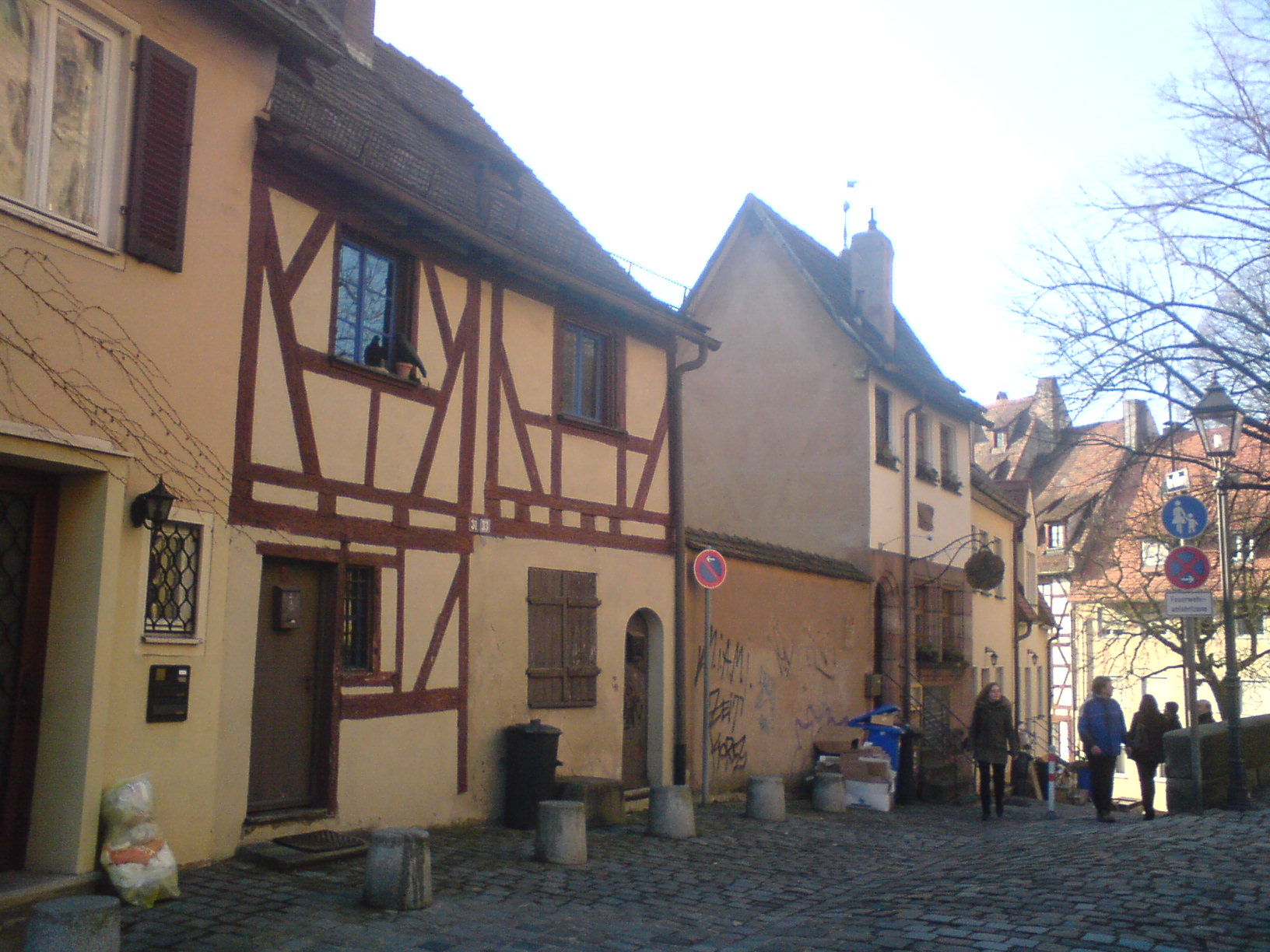
The Craftmen's houses (Am Ölberg, nos. 31 and 35) in the old town of Nuremberg, Germany.

The craftsmen's houses are among the important architectural monuments of Nuremberg's old historic centre. They are located along the alley Am Ölberg at the foot of the Nuremberg Castle. In this alley is also the oldest timber-framed building in Nuremberg from the year 1338.

The first human occupation in this place was in the 11th century when Salian settlements were built south of the castle for castle craftsmen, services and traders. This was the starting point for the development of the city of Nuremberg.

The craftsmen's houses were built as small, single-storey living and workshop houses for craftsmen, some with only one or two rooms. These were later expanded, but remained in their medieval core. The original thatched roofs were banned early on due to the risk of fire. Only a few of these narrow two-story houses survived the bombing raids in the Second World War unscathed.
