= Nuremberg Architecture Prize =

Architecture prize

The city of Nuremberg awards the Nuremberg Architecture Prize for outstanding contributions and achievements in the field of architecture.

It has been awarded in 1987, 1993, 2004, and 2007.
