= Maximilian Nagel =

German theologian (1747–1772)

Maximilian Nagel (29 November 1747 - 20 January 1772) was a German theologian.

== Life ==
Maximilian Nagel was born in Altdorf bei Nürnberg, the eldest of the 14 recorded children of the Hebrew scholar and Orientalist Johann Andreas Michael Nagel and of that man's wife, Maria Magdalena Riederer, daughter of the Nuremberg market superintendent. While Maximilian was still a child he was seen to be exceptionally talented, as a result of which his father paid particular attention to his education. In part he was taught directly by his father: in part he was sent to city school under Rector Kleemann. He thereby acquired a broad schooling that centred on Philosophy, but which also took in Latin, Greek, French, Arabic, Hebrew and Rabbinic languages.

After this he attended Michael Adelbulner's lectures in Mathematics at the local University of Altdorf. In April 1762 he was accepted into the Altdorf academic community and progressed his university studies further. It was also during this period that he read the works of the great Greek and Latin poets (and in other languages). He was attending lectures from various of the scholars at the university, including his own father.

Nagel as a student also practiced oral skills, presenting disputation arguments, sermons and catechisms in public. He wrote poetry in both German and Latin, but preferred Latin. And he helped his father in his work. He belonged to university societies such as the Altdorf German Society, and he was treasurer of the Latin Society. However, by the time he was in his twentieth year he was ill: Georg Andreas Will identified his illness as Hypochondriasis. He noted that Nagel often worked through the night and then was still the first in his father's house to get out of bed in the morning. Nagel kept his illness from his father, taking care always to appear cheerful and energetic in his father's presence, because he feared that if his father thought him ill he would forbid him from working. Eventually, however, the father realised that his son was unwell. In order to broaden his son's experience he now sent him to Nuremberg as a possible candidate for the ministry.

From 1769 Maximilian Nagel lived in Nuremberg, supporting himself by working as a private tutor. After two years he passed the exam necessary to become a candidate preacher. After that he practiced his preaching and at the same time found time to produce a catalogue of the Nuremberg city library. Early in 1772 he returned to his father's home at Altdorf, however, and here he died, aged just 24, on 20 January 1772. Nagel senior was much affected by the death of his eldest son. The cause of death is given as Auszehrung, a wasting disease most commonly associated with tuberculosis or cancer.
