= Gerhard Adam Neuhofer =

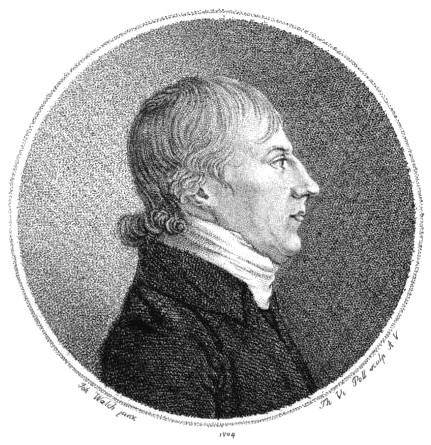
- G.A. Neuhofer (1804) by Johann Walch (1757-1816)
- Born: 16 January 1773; Augsburg
- Died: 12 December 1816 (aged 43); Augsburg
- Occupations: deacon; teacher; philologist; historian; poet
- Spouse(s): 1.Johanna Dorothea Wasser; 2. Rosina Barbara Sophia Degmair
- Parent(s): Georg Christoph Neuhofer (1734-1796); Maria Barbara (born Engelbrecht)

Gerhard Adam Neuhofer (16 January 1773 – 12 December 1816) was a German deacon, teacher, philologist, historian and poet. He was born and died in Augsburg.

== Life ==
Neuhofer's father, Georg Christoph Neuhofer (1734-1796) was an Augsburg cotton worker. From the year of his fifth birthday Gerhard Adam Neuhofer attended the St.Anna Gymnasium (school) in the city, where he remained a pupil till 1791. During this time, during the early 1780s he was also receiving private tuition from his cousin, the young deacon (later noteworthy both for his writings on natural history and as the parson at the protestant Barfüßer church), Gottlieb Tobias Wilhelm (1758-1811). He moved away between 1791 and 1795 to enroll at the University of Altdorf where the scope of his studies covered Poetry, Rhetoric, History, Latin, Greek, Hebrew, Philosophy and Theology. Influential tutors included the protestant theologians Johann Philipp Gabler and Georg Lorenz Bauer. Another was Wolfgang Jäger who died shortly after Neuhofer completed his studies and returned to Augsburg in May 1795. Neuhofer promptly composed a detailed obituary of Jäger.

In 1795 he passed his Theology exams at Augsburg and became a Catechist in a House of correction (Zuchthaus), moving on in January 1799 to a so-called "Pestilentiarius". This involved extensive work in military hospitals in 1799 and 1800 which provided him with good experience, but it also imperiled his life through frequent exposure to infectious diseases. In January 1803 he became an "Adjunkt" in a hospital and in March 1805 he was appointed deacon at Augsburg's Barfüßerkirche. The next year, in January 1806, he was installed as deacon at St James's (St. Jakob). In 1807 he took a teaching post at his old school, giving lessons in Greek, Hebrew and History. However, it appears that by this time his health was beginning to falter, and in 1809 he was obliged to give up his teaching work on health grounds. He was appointed deacon at St. Anna's in 1813.

In addition, during these years Neuhofer worked tirelessly on his writing, while also contributing to the "Morgenblatt für gebildete Leser" ("Morning news sheet for [well] educated readers") published by Johann Friedrich Cotta.

== Personal ==
Neuhofer married his first wife, Johanna Dorothea Wasser, in 1803. Her father was Johann Rosinus Jakob Wasser, the minister in charge at St James's (St. Jakob)'s church. By the time she died, in November 1815, only two of their ten children were still alive. In May 1816 he married another minister's daughter, Rosina Barbara Sophia Degmair. A few months later, on 12 December 1816, Neuhofer himself died unexpectedly at his home from what was described as a "nervous attack" (einem "Nervenschlag"), shortly after delivering a tutorial to students.

His grave no longer survives, but details are recorded by Ferdinand Seidel who in 1838 recorded the details of all the inscriptions in Augsburg on graves of Protestants.
