= Johann Andreas Michael Nagel =

German Hebrew scholar and Orientalist (1710-1788)

- Born: 29 September 1710; Sulzbach, Palatinate-Sulzbach, Holy Roman Empire
- Died: 29 September 1788; Altdorf bei Nürnberg, Holy Roman Empire
- Occupation: Orientalist & Polymath
- Spouse: Maria Magdalena Riederer( - 1773)
- Children: 14

Johann Andreas Michael Nagel (29 September 1710 – 29 September 1788) was a German Hebrew scholar and Orientalist.

== Life ==
Nagel was born in Sulzbach, to the east of Nuremberg. He was taught by the local Cantor who later moved on to teach at the St. Lawrence School in Nuremberg. Additionally, he received his early instruction in Latin and Religion from his father. Other tutors also came to the house, in the first instance with the intention of preparing him for a life in business. In the end, however, he was redirected to a theological career. Now taught not in the vernacular but in Latin, by a deacon who covered the middle eastern languages, he moved on to the Gymnasium (secondary school) in Nuremberg. At school, too, he was taught the languages, also receiving instruction on geography and morals. Eventually, in 1731, he entered Altdorf University where his principal focus was on theology. Here he also studied philosophy, history and the history of literature, geography, mathematics, logic, the history of philosophy, "Belles-lettres" and natural law.

In 1734 he produced a formal defence of work he had undertaken on the Panegyrici Latini of Pliny, and the next year he was awarded a Magister degree based on his inaugural disputation which dealt with the Roman calendar in the period after the consulate. Still in 1734 he briefly relocated to Jena, and then Leipzig where he heard lectures on Asceticism and Exegesis, and also attended lectures by Johann Christoph Gottsched on rhetoric and poetry creation. At Leipzig Nagel also received support from Johann Erhard Kapp and Gottfried Mascov. It was on the recommendation of Mascov that he published a descriptive work concerning Ptolemy's Geographical writing, which ended up in the Leipzig City Library. Nagel was able to deepen the extent of his studies through the Leipzig library. Relative relaxation after his studying came from visits to the Collegium Musicum, then under the direction of Johann Sebastian Bach.

From Leipzig he went on to the (then separate) universities of Halle and Wittenberg, where he befriended various academics, before returning to Altdorf in 1736. Here, in 1737, he successfully defended a dissertation, thereby receiving his habilitation (qualification) and obtaining a lectureship. In 1738 he was appointed a schools inspector, two years later appointed to a full professorship of Metaphysics and Middle-eastern literature. On taking office he delivered a speech on the authority ascribed to the Talmud in recent Jewish scholarship. Shortly after this he was appointed University Librarian with timetabling responsibilities and Professor of Rhetoric.

Nagel was Rector of his university three times. (The appointment normally lasted for six months at a time.) He served fourteen times as dean of his faculty. In 1762 he established a Latin Society, serving as its moderator. In 1766 he became Faculty Senior, becoming University Senior in 1783. He died on 29 September 1788, aged 78.

== Family ==
In 1747 Nagel married Maria Magdalena Riederer, the daughter of the Nuremberg Market superintendent. The marriage produced 14 recorded children. Three of the sons died shortly after completing their education. There is further information on six of their children as follows:

- Maximilian Nagel (1747–1772) was a notable scholar who died shortly after completing his education.
- Johann Christoph Nagel died shortly after completing his education.
- Michael Christoph Nagel died shortly after completing his education.
- Johann Bartholomäus Nagel was working as a Lutheran pastor in Hersbruck in 1806.
- Ursula Jacobina Nagel married the historian Konrad Mannert (1756-1834).
- Johann Bernhard Nagel, worked in Windsheim.

== Evaluation ==
Heinrich Döring describes Nagel as a modest and unassuming man, with a learning that was both deep and broad. He was an outstanding orientalist, but was also at home with Latin and Greek literature, with philosophy and with the arts. Several scholars have identified him as the first German philologist, and the first of the great German orientalists. Nevertheless, there were colleagues who believed he could have achieved far more if he had been more assertive. His many written works display a high level of skill with the Latin language. He mostly wrote dissertations. Some of his works with middle-eastern contents were still considered important in the nineteenth century even though by that time research in these areas had progressed enormously. Nagel also contributed to Johann Friedrich Hirt's "Orientalische und exegetische Bibliothek" (1772–76) and to other academic journals.

== Works ==
- Specimen academicum de modo disputandi, quo doctores Judaei quondam Noribergae in exercendis atque acuendis suis discipulis usi sunt (Altdorf 1737)
- Diss. de lingua Aramaea (Altdorf 1739)
- Diss de argumentatione […] (Altdorf 1739)
- Generaliores conjugationum Aramaearum characteres, grammaticae Danzianae accommodati (Altdorf 1739)
- Diss. de lingua adscita hominum orbis Babylonici, ad illustr. Esr. 4.18 (Altdorf 1740)
- Diss. de gradatione adscendente in quatuor summis principiis metaphysicis, quibus animus cultior in quaestionibus contradictoriis discernendis utitur (Altdorf 1740)
- Prolusio ad orat. inaug. de Caino ipso vultu perditos mores suos prodente (Altdorf 1740)
- Omne felicitatis genus a Deo tribus celsissimis domibus (Brandenburgicis) ex animo apprecatur Jehuda Loew, Arnhemiensis (Altdorf 1740/1741)
- Observationes in vers. I. Cap. I Geneseos (Altdorf 1741)
- Observationes in vers. II Cap. I Geneseos (Altdorf 1742)
- Diss. philos. Soriten neque esse neque recte dici syllogismum (Altdorf 1742)
- Progr. ad funus Catharinae Margarethae Schwarziae (Altdorf 1742/1743)
- Diss. de Iudis secularibus veterum Romanorum in Germara babylonica commemoratis (Altdorf 1743)
- Diss. de prima Alcorani Sura (Altdorf 1743)
- Diss. de Elia Levita Germano (Altdorf 1745)
- Diss. de studio philosophiae Graecae inter Arabes (Altdorf 1745)
- Diss. de generibus inferioribus et superioribus (Altdorf 1745)
- Diss. de Calendario veterum Ebraeorum (Altdorf 1746)
- Diss. de ordine naturali propositionum syllogismorum primae figurae (Altdorf 1746)
- Progr. ad funus Doroth. Kirsteniae (Altdorf 1748/1749)
- Diss. de tribus codicibus msctis Ebraicis (Altdorf 1749)
- Diss. de locis quibusdam Jobi, in quibus cel. Schultens majorem lucem desideravit (Altdorf 1751)
- Diss. de Proselytis traetis (Altdorf 1751)
- Progr. ad funus C. G. Schwarzii (Altdorf 1751/1752)
- Progr. ad funus J. C. Bittneri (Altdorf 1752)
- Progr. ad funus Annae Margarethae Beckiae (Altdorf 1751)
- Progr. ad funus J. M. Dustavii (Altdorf 1752/1753)
- Progr. ad funus J. D. Baieri (Altdorf 1752/1753)
- Progr. ad funus Helenae Sibyllae Mulleriae (Altdorf 1752/1753)
- Diss. de contractu quodam Judaico emtionis et venditionis (Altdorf 1754)
- Progr. loca quaedam Censorini emendans etc. (Altdorf 1754)
- Progr. ad funus Barbarae Sabinae Craussiae (Altdorf 1754/1755)
- Progr. ad funus J. G. Neubaueri (Altdorf 1755/1756)
- Progr. ad funus Appolloniae Spisiae (Altdorf 1755/1756)
- Progr. ad funus C. A. Ziegleri (Altdorf 1755/1756)
- Diss. de usu loquendi (Altdorf 1755)
- Diss. de stilo Mosis (Altdorf 1755)
- Diss. de culpa uxoris Lothi ad Genes. 19, 26 (Altdorf 1755)
- Diss. in vers. 24. Cap. XLIX Geneseos. (Altdorf 1756)
- Diss. contra vindicias juris naturae Christianorum (Altdorf 1756)
- Progr. ad funus G. D. Bauneri (Altdorf 1756)
- Progr. ad funus J. G. Boeneri (Altdorf 1756)
- Progr. ad funus H. A. de Moll (Altdorf 1756)
- Progr. ad funus E. F. Zobelii (Altdorf 1756)
- Progr. ad funus J. B. Kranneckeri (Altdorf 1756)
- Progr. Jubilaeum Acad. Gryphiswald. nomine Rect. et Senatus indicens et gratulans (Altdorf 1756)
- Progr. ad Orat. panegyr. gloriosae memoriae Ser. Prine. Caroli Guil. Frid. Margravii Brandenb. Onold. (Altdorf 1757)
- Progr. quo codes Ms. Gualteri de Castellione recensetur (Altdorf 1757)
- Diss. in Amosi 2, 11, num Nasaraei potuerint accensere beneficiis divinis (Altdorf 1757)
- Spicilegium vitae Eliae Levitae Germ. cum particula libri ejus Masoret Hammasoret complectens (Altdorf 1757)
- Diss. de diebus Aegyptiacis (Altdorf 1757)
- Progr. ad exsequias C. Steigeri, L.L. Lect. (Altdorf 1757/1758)
- Progr. ad celebr. fun. D. G. F. Deinlini (Altdorf 1757/1758)
- Diss. contra praefationem secundam in libr. Masoret Hammasoret Eliae Levitae Germ. (Altdorf 1758)
- Progr. ad funus G. Lipp, Stud. (Altdorf 1758)
- Progr. ad funus J. M. Zellii, Stud. (Altdorf 1758)
- Progr. Jubilaeum Acad. Jenensis indicens et gratulans (Altdorf 1758/1759)
- Progr. ad funus C. J. nat de Olshausen, conjugis D. J. B. Bernholdi (Altdorf 1759/1760)
- Progr. ad funus J. J. Loedelii, Stud. (Altdorf 1760/1761)
- Memoria Jo. Heumanni de Teutschenbrunn JCti etc. civibus posterisque commendata (Altdorf 1760/1761)
- Diss. parten primam praef. tertiae libri Masoret Hammasoret Eliae Levitae complectens (Altdorf 1762)
- Diss. de Plejadibus Graecorum (Altdorf 1762)
- R. Benj. Tudelani itinerarium (Altdorf 1762)
- Progr. ad funus A. B. maritae A. Muslonii, L. L. Lectoris (Altdorf 1762/1763)
- Progr. ad funus Th. Demian, Stud. (Altdorf 1762/1763)
- Epistola ultima honori A. C. Nageliae et consolatione unici fratris sui G. J. Nagelii praematuram mortem conjugis suae deplorantis, dicata (Altdorf 1763/1764)
- Diss. partem secundam praef. tert. libri Masoret Hammasoret Eliae Levitae continens (Altdorf 1763)
- Recensio Codicis MS. Martyrologii Rom. Biblioth. acad. (Altdorf 1763)
- Progr. ad funus D. C. viduae D. G. H. Linckii, P. P. (Altdorf 1763/1764)
- Progr. ad funus C. A. Solgeri (Altdorf 1763/1764)
- Placita Societatis Latinae Altdorfinae (Altdorf 1764)
- Progr. quo ad celebrationem secundi diei natalis sui invitat Societas Latina (Altdorf 1764/1765)
- Commentatio de dissensione veterum Graecorum et Latinorum in finienda periodo brevissima (Altdorf 1764)
- Observationes et emendationes nonnullae in G. H. Nieuporti ritus Romanorum (Altdorf 1764)
- Commentatio de Cod. MS. Bibliothecae acad. Altdorf. Constantiui Africani de febribus (Altdorf 1764)
- Progr. ad funus J. C. Schindleri, Ministri et Bibliopegi acad. (Altdorf 1764)
- Progr. ad funus C. R. orta Deinlinae, conjugis J. G. Bernholdi (Altdorf 1764/1765)
- Progr. ad funus viduae D. E. G. Rinckii, P. P. (Altdorf 1764/1765)
- Diss. partem tertiam praef. tertiae libri Masoret Hammasoret Eliae Levitae complectens (Altdorf 1765)
- Diss. in vers. 15 et ssq. Cap. II Malachiae (Altdorf 1765)
- Diss. in vers. 14 1 Reg. XX. (Altdorf 1766)
- Progr. ad funus D. J. Kirstenii, P. P. (Altdorf 1765/1766)
- Progr. de obitu augustiss. Imp. Francisci, luctu deservando etc. (Altdorf 1755/1766)
- Argumenta quaedam calliditatis interpretum Alexandrinorum V. T. (Altdorf 1766)
- Commentatio de Cod. MS. Membr. Horatii Bibliothecae acad. Altdorf. cum specimine varietatis lectionum. (Particulae quatuor.) (Altdorf 1766/1767)
- Progr. ad funus J. G. Bernholdi (Altdorf 1766/1767)
- Progr. ad funus B. J. Beckii, Stud. (Altdorf 1766/1767)
- Progr. ad funus Ortelii, a litteris publicis et commentariis praefecturae (Altdorf 1766/1767)
- Progr. ad funus J. A. Spiesii, D. et P. P. (Altdorf 1766/1767)
- Memoria D. J. Treusenreuteri de Teutschenbrunn Ser. March. Brandenb. Culmb. a Consiliis Justitiae Erlang. (Altdorf 1766/1767)
- Diss. de Schilo Messia, non Schilunte urbe, Genes. 49, 10 praedicto (Altdorf 1767)
- Progr. ad funus A. C. ortu Hambergerianae, D. J. D. Baieri, P. P. viduae (Altdorf 1767/1768)
- Comentatio de recto usu concinnitatis (Altdorf 1768)
- Progr. ad funus D. J. J. Jantke, P. P. (Altdorf 1768/1769)
- Progr. ad funus P. P. Mayeri, Stud. (Altdorf 1768/1769)
- Progr. ad funus B. conjugis D. J. N. Weissii, P. P. (Altdorf 1768/1769)
- Diss. de duobus Codd. MSS. Bibliothecae publ. Norimbergensis (Altdorf 1769)
- Monumentum insigni munificentiae atque immortali gloriae viri ill. Dom. C. J. Trewii, grati memorisque animi et perpetui cultus sui testandi causa, factum ad Acad. Altdorf (Altdorf 1769/1770)
- Prisca narratio Graece, Latine et Talmudice superstes (Altdorf 1769)
- Recensio Codicis MS. chart. Biblioth. acad. Altdorf. Horatii carmina aliaque complectentis, cum specimine var. ejusd. Bibl. lect. Horatii hujus Cod. et spicilegio var. lect. Cod. membr. Horatii Particulae quinque (Altdorf 1769–1780)
- Progr. ad funus M. A. Baueri, Stud. (Altdorf 1769/1770)
- Progr. ad funus D. J. B. Bernholdi, P. P. (Altdorf 1769/1770)
- Progr. ad funus S. J. Fichtneri, J. U. D. et Consil. Justit. Onold. (Altdorf 1769/1770)
- Progr. ad funus J. G. Mayeri acad. typographi (Altdorf 1769)
- Progr. ad orationem encomiasticam merito debitoque honori Viri ill. D. C. J. Trewii cras habendam (Altdorf 1770/1771)
- Nomen laudesque matronae C. H. S. Heumanniae de Teutschenbrunn viduae etc. perpetuae memoriae consecrans (Altdorf 1770/1771)
- Progr. ad funus D. J. Linkciae (Altdorf 1770/1771)
- Progr. ad funus J. B. Viatis de Schoppershof, Stud. (Altdorf 1770/1771)
- Progr. ad funus J. B. Viatis de Schoppershof, Stud. (Altdorf 1770/1771)
- Observationes nonnullas in Scholia graeca Nubium Aristophanis (Altdorf 1771)
- Diss. continens partem quartam eamque ultimam praef. tertiae libri Masoret Hammasoret Eliae Levitae (Altdorf 1771)
- Progr. ad funus D. J. F. Adolph, P. P. (Altdorf 1771/1772)
- Progr. ad funus R. C. filiae D. J. A. Dietelmair, P. P. (Altdorf 1771/1772)
- Diss. contin. varias lect. XXV Capp. priorum Jeremiae ex duobus Codd. MSS. Hebr. desumtae (Altdorf 1772)
- Diss. de Blityri et Scindapso (Altdorf 1772)
- Diss. in vers. 8 Cap. VII Nehemiae (Altdorf 1772)
- Diss. contin. theses philosophicas (Altdorf 1772)
- Diss. in judicium Longini de Apostolo Paulo (Altdorf 1772)
- Progr. ad funus M. B. nat. Wachaviae, D. M. Adelbulneri, P. P. maritae (Altdorf 1773/1774)
- Progr. ad funus M. B. viduae D. J. J. Jantkii, P. P. (Altdorf 1773/1774)
- Progr. ad funus A. A. Seidelii, Stud. (Altdorf 1773/1774)
- Progr. ad funus S. M. nat Tucheriae de Simmelsdorf, Car. Ge. de Woelckern in Kalchreut, Opp. et agri Altdorf. Praefecti, conjugis (Altdorf 1773/1774)
- Programmata (XIV) ad recordationem annuam muneris magnifici a Viro ill. J. C. Trew, Academiae Altdorf. dati, notas in Benj. Tudelensis itinearium continentia (Altdorf 1774–1787)
- Progr. de disciplina academica, praesertim variis signis et generibus Pennalismi (Altdorf 1774/1775)
- Progr. cont. pacti et conventi formulam cum ill. Universitate Friderico-Alexandrina (Altdorf 1775/1776)
- Progr. ad celebr. fun. G. J. L. Vogelii, Prof. halensis (Altdorf 1776/1777)
- Monumentum grati animi a Rectore et Collegio Professorum Acadamiae Altdorf. memoriae M. M. Metzgeriae, natae Storiae matronae multa laude dignissimae, statutum (Altdorf 1777)
- Progr. ad funus S. M. Baieriae, viduae D. J. G. Baieri, P. P. (Altdorf 1777/1778)
- Progr. ad funus J. G. Harderi, Jur. Cand. (Altdorf 1777/1778)
- Progr. ad Jubilaeum Universitatis Tubingensis indicens et gratulans (Altdorf 1777/1778)
- Progr. ad solemnitatem condedarum exuviarum Magnis Academ. Rectoris. D. W. A. Spiesii (Altdorf 1778/1779)
- Progr. ad funus D. M. Adelbulneri, P. P. (Altdorf 1779/1780)
- Progr. inaugurationem Universitatis Stuttgardiensis indicens (Altdorf 1782/1783)
- Progr. Sacra saecularia Universitatis Wirceburgensis indicens et congratulans (Altdorf 1782/1783)
- Progr. ad funus J. G. de Fabrice (Altdorf 1783/1784)
- Progr. ad funus C. D. Mayeri, Polygrammatei Altdorfi (Altdorf 1783/1784)
- Progr. ad officium concionis funebris D. J. N. Wiess, P. P. et Acad. Senioris (Altdorf 1783/1784)
- Oratio in memoriam conditi et absoluti abhinc […] (Altdorf 1783)
- Progr. ad funus J. L. Stadleri […] (Altdorf 1785)
- Progr. ad funus J. A. Hesselii, P. L. C. et acad. […] (Altdorf 1785/1786)
- Progr. ad funus J. C. Hoffmanni, Magistri palaestrae (Altdorf 1785/1786)
- Progr. ad funus D. J. A. Dietelmair, P. P. (Altdorf 1785/1786)
- Progr. Sacra Saecularia Universitatis Heidelbergensis in ingens et congratulans (Altdorf 1786/1787)
- Progr. ad funus C. A. Füreri ab Haimendorf (Altdorf 1786/1787)
- Progr. ad funus M. B. viduae D. J. A. Dietelmair (Altdorf 1787/1788)
- Progr. ad funus J. E. F. maritae D. C. Th. Hoffmann, P. P. A. (Altdorf 1787/1788)
- Progr. ad festivitatem semisaecularem Academiae […] indicens et congratulans (Altdorf 1787/1788)
- Progr. Ministrum academicum intactum semper inviolatumque esse oportere mandans (Altdorf 1788/1789)
- Progr. ad record. annuam muneris magnifici a viro Trew, Acad. Altdorf. dati […] (Altdorf 1788)
