= Joseph Paul von Cobres =

German nobleman & naturalist (1746-1823)

Joseph Paul Edler von Cobres
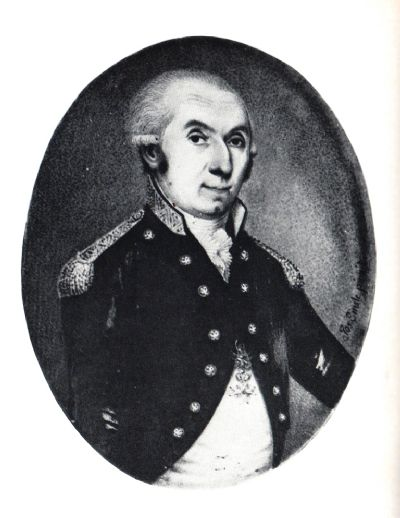
- Miniature portrait in oil on ivory by Joseph Einsle (1774–1829)
- Born: Giuseppe Paolo Cobres; 10 January 1746; Venice
- Died: 26 December 1823 (aged 77)
- Occupations: Bibliophile & naturalist
- Spouse: Maria Anna Tonella (m. 1769)

Joseph Paul Edler von Cobres (10 January 1746 – 26 December 1823) was a German nobleman, bibliophile and naturalist. He produced a two volume catalogue of his book collection in 1781-2 called "Deliciae Cobresianae". He also collected natural history objects and supported scientists and naturalist but was eventually forced to sell off his collections after the Napoleonic Wars.

== Life and work ==
Cobres was a Catholic merchant and banker from Venice, born Giuseppe Paolo Cobres. He settled in Augsburg in 1769. He was a part of a circle of bankers that included Obwexer and Tonella families. He began to collect natural history objects in the 1770s and in 1771 he acquired the collections of Wolfgang Jakob Sulzer and Christoph Heinrich Weng. In 1769 he married Maria Anna, widow of Joseph Maria Tonella of Augsburg, who came from another Augsburg banking family of Obwexers. The couple moved to a new house on Maximilianstrasse called Zur Himmelsleiter. Here he began to accumulate more of his natural history specimens and books and became a supporter of scientists and naturalists. Famous visitors to his collections included the Augsburg naturalists Gottlieb Tobias Wilhelm (1758–1811), Jacob Hübner (1761–1826), Heinrich Gottlob Lang (1739–1809) and Carl Christian Wilhelm Juch (1772–1821). The mineralogist Karl Ludwig Giesecke alias Johann Georg Metzler (1761–1833) was also a visitor. He also sold duplicates of specimens to other collectors. He was appointed a royal advisor and elevated to nobility as a Holy Roman Empire knight on 24 April 1780. He became a patron of the Imperial City Art Academy in 1781. On 27 September 1791 he was made a Knight of the Order of Malta by Joseph II (1741–1790). In 1781-82 he published a catalogue of his books in two volumes Deliciae Cobresianae. In 1792 he was inducted to the Imperial Leopoldian-Carolinian German Academy of Natural Scientists (Academie Naturae Curiosorum) under the nickname Plinius VIII. He was also made member of the Bavarian Academy of Sciences in 1811. In 1793 he moved an estate called Sölde in Göggingen near Augsburg.

=== Bankruptcy ===
He had to sell off some of his assets around 1813 due to rising debts and bankruptcy of his bank following the Napoleonic wars. He offered his collections to the Royal Bavarian Academy for 30,000 guilders with an annual pension of 2000 guilders but the academy refused and took only some materials. Some of the material went to the Augsburg Natural History Society in 1851 and this later went into the Natural Science Museum at Stetten House which was destroyed by bombs in February 1944 in World War II.

=== Legacy ===
The plant genus Kobresia was named after him in 1805 by Karl Ludwig Willdenow (1765–1812). A street in Göggingen was named after him in 1973.
