= Torczyner =

Torczyner is a surname. Notable people with the surname include:

- Harry Torczyner, birth name of Naftali Herz Tur-Sinai (1886-1973), Bible scholar and Hebrew language linguist
- Jacques Torczyner (1914–2013), leader in the American and international Zionist movement.
