= Juch =

Juch is a surname of German origin. Notable people with the surname include:

- Carl Wilhelm Juch (1774–1821), German chemist, pharmacist and botanist
- Emma Johanna Antonia Juch (1860–1939), Austrian soprano opera singer
