= Jewish Liberation Project =

- Founded: 1968; 58 years ago
- Type: Nonprofit
- Headquarters: New York City, NY, U.S.

The Jewish Liberation Project (JLP) was a Labor Zionist organization founded in 1968 by young American Jews. The group supported the existence of the State of Israel and identified as anti-capitalist. It was critical of the Israeli government and expressed support for Palestinian self-determination.

== History ==
The Jewish Liberation Project was established in New York City in June 1968 by a group of approximately 25 to 40 young American Jews. A Labor Zionist organization, its constitution expressed opposition to capitalism and "all other systems which concentrate wealth and power in the hands of elites". While supportive of the existence of the State of Israel, the JLP was critical of the Israeli government's policies and actions.

At a time when many Zionists and American Jews distanced themselves from the New Left due to concerns about anti-Zionism and antisemitism, the JLP sought to engage with the New Left while maintaining a Zionist orientation. It collaborated with other progressive Zionist groups, including the New Zionists in Boston and the Jewish Liberation Coalition in Providence, Rhode Island. These organizations later formed a loose coalition known as the Radical Zionist Alliance in the early 1970s, which issued joint statements.

In December 1969, the JLP held a protest outside the headquarters of the Zionist Organization of America (ZOA) in response to ZOA President Jacques Torczyner’s endorsement of President Richard Nixon’s Vietnam War policies. The JLP described this support as inconsistent with Jewish and Zionist principles and contrary to "the most vital concerns of the Jewish people".

== Members ==
- Aviva Cantor

== See also ==
- Labor Zionism
- Jewish-American working class
- Jewish left
