= Pietro Righini =

Italian painter

Pietro Righini (2 August 1683 - 20 December 1742) was an Italian architect and scenic designer. Born in Parma, he was active as a scenic designer with both the Teatro Regio di Torino and the Teatro di San Carlo. He painted the scenes to Bajazet and the Nino Drammi by Francesco Gambarini in 1719-1720. Among his pupils is Vincenzo Dal Rè. Several of his scenes were popularized as engravings by German artist Martin Engelbrecht.
