= Ze'ev Ben-Haim =

Israeli linguist (1907–2013)

Ze'ev Ben-Ḥayyim זאב בן-חיים
- Born: 28 December 1907; Mościska Galicia, Austria-Hungary (now Ukraine)
- Died: 6 August 2013 (aged 105)
- Citizenship: Israeli
- Occupation: linguist
- Writing career
- Language: Hebrew
- Notable awards: Israel Prize (1964)

Ze'ev Wolf Goldman, later known as Ze'ev Ben-Ḥayyim (Hebrew: זאב בן-חיים; 28 December 1907 – 6 August 2013), was a leading Israeli linguist and a former president of the Academy of the Hebrew Language.

== Biography ==
Ben-Ḥayyim was born in Mościska, Galicia, then part of Austria-Hungary and now in Ukraine). Schooled in his youth by private tutors and later completing high school at a gymnasium, where he studied classical languages, he left Galicia to study on a scholarship at the Jewish Theological Seminary of Breslau and, in parallel, he studied at the Schlesische Friedrich-Wilhelms-Universität, where he received a doctorate in Semitic linguistics. He spent a year in Mandate Palestine in 1931, studying at the Institute of Jewish Studies at the Hebrew University of Jerusalem. He presented his work for his doctorate in 1932 on the subject of personal names in Nabataean epigraphy. In 1933, he received Semikhah (traditional rabbinical ordination) from the Jewish Theological Seminary of Breslau as well as the Ph.D."

At the end of 1933 he immigrated to Palestine. The following year he was appointed secretary to the Hebrew Language Committee (forerunner of the Academy of the Hebrew Language), working closely with committee head Hayim Nahman Bialik in the last months before that poet's sudden death. Ben-Ḥayyim lectured in the Hebrew language at the Hebrew University of Jerusalem from 1948, becoming a full professor in 1955 and retiring in 1976.

Between 1955 and 1965, he was editor of Leshoneynu (Our Language), the principal periodical of the Academy of the Hebrew Language. In 1961 he was appointed vice president of the Academy of the Hebrew Language and, in the same year, was appointed to head the Historical Dictionary of the Hebrew Language project, serving in such capacity until 1992. In 1973, following the death of Naftali Herz Tur-Sinai, Ben-Ḥayyim was appointed as the second president of the Academy of the Hebrew Language, holding that post until 1981. Ben-Ḥayyim lived in Jerusalem until his death at the age of 105.

== Awards and honours ==
- In 1964 Ben-Ḥayyim was awarded the Israel Prize for Jewish studies.
- In 1966 he became a member of the Israel Academy of Sciences and Humanities
- In 1971 he was awarded the Rothschild Prize for Jewish studies.

== Published works ==
Ben-Ḥayyim has published many works and authored many articles over the years. The following is a selection of such works:

- Between 1957 and 1977, he published in five volumes his monumental Hebrew work on the Hebrew and Aramaic traditions of the Samaritans,
- "Observations on the Hebrew and Aramaic Lexicon from Samaritan Tradition", Hebräische Wortforschung: Festschrift zum 80 Geburtstag von Walter Baumgartner, Leiden 1967, pages 12–24.
- "Towards a New Edition of Tîbåt Mårqe", Études samaritaines: Pentateuque et Targum, exégèse et philogie, chroniques, Louvain–Paris 1988, pages 107–108.
- במלחמתה של לשון [The Struggle for a Language]. Jerusalem 1992.
- A Grammar of Samaritan Hebrew: Based on the Recitation of the Law in Comparison with the Tiberian and Other Jewish Traditions, a revised edition in English, with assistance from A. Tal, Jerusalem and Winona Lake 2000. ISBN 1-57506-047-7

== See also ==
- List of Israel Prize recipients
- Study of the Hebrew language
