= Gottlieb Tobias Wilhelm =

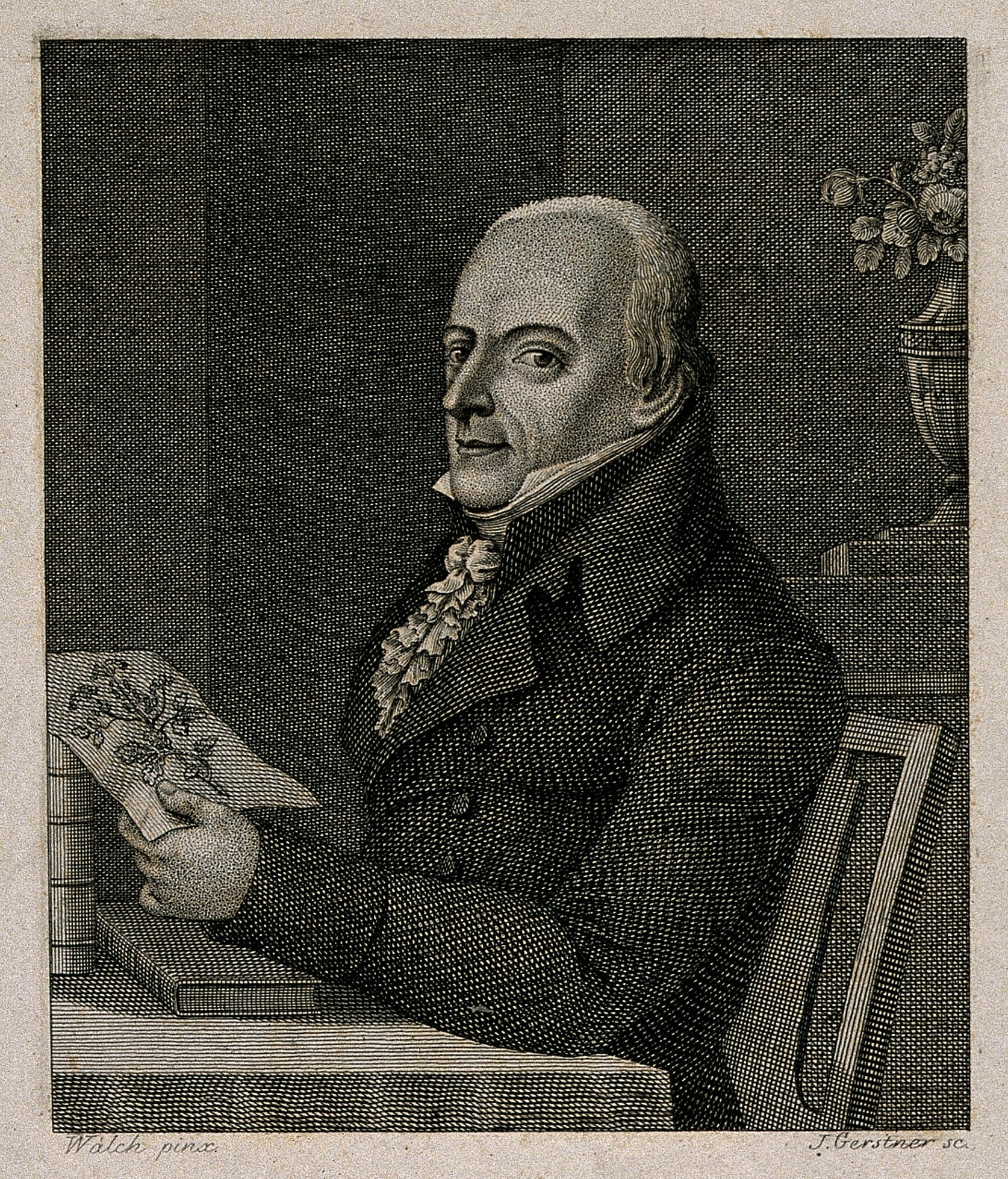
Portrait engraving of Gottlieb Tobias Wilhelm by J. Gerstner after a painting by J. Walch

Gottlieb Tobias Wilhelm (16 October 1758, Augsburg - 12 December 1811, Augsburg) was a Protestant pastor and natural history writer, probably best known for his monumental "Unterhaltungen aus der Naturgeschichte" ("Conversations from natural history") published originally in 19 volumes with posthumous additions extending it to 25 volumes. Three volumes dealt with human physiology and anatomy. He held that humans had descended from one pair following Biblical creation and argued that this made all humans equal. He wrote against slavery and the ill-treatment of people from other lands and cultures.

== Life and work ==
Wilhelm was the fourth of 14 children and son of Augsburg engraver and publisher Christian Art Wilhelm. The engraver Martin Engelbrecht was his grandfather. He studied at the St. Anna's Gymnasium from 1767 to 1777, and between 1777 and 1781 at the Evangelical College. After receiving a scholarship he studied theology, philosophy and philology at Leipzig under Professor Ernst Platner, Samuel Frederick Nathanael Morus and Johann August Ernesti. From 1781 he was in the service of the Protestant Church in Augsburg, and also a teacher at the St. Anna's Gymnasium. In 1783 he was a preacher at the Hospital of the Holy Spirit. From 1786 to 1796, he was a deacon of the Barfüßer Parish, 1796-1806 deacon at St. Jakob and 1806-1811 pastor of the Barfüßer Parish. In 1787 he married Christina Johanna Regina Preu (1758-1820), daughter of a church superintendent, the marriage however was childless. William was a member of several Natural History organisations: "Gesellschaft Naturforschender Freunde zu Berlin“, "Naturforschende Gesellschaft zu Halle“, "Vaterländische Gesellschaft der Ärzte und Naturforscher Schwabens“ und "Regensburgische Botanische Gesellschaft“.

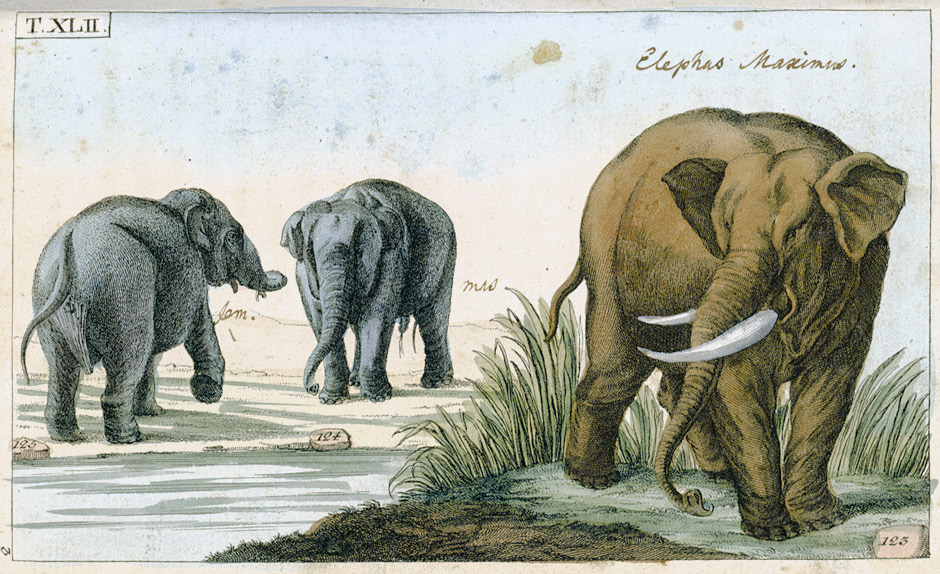
Elephants from "Unterhaltungen aus der Naturgeschichte"

Wilhelm was a popular preacher and author of items that were mostly anonymously written for calendars, almanacs and magazines. From 1792 publication of his "Unterhaltungen aus der Naturgeschichte" (Discourses on Natural History) in weekly installments from his father's publishing house which was then run by his brother Paul Martin, with nearly 1500 copperplate illustrations by renowned Augsburg engravers such as Jacob Xaver Schmuzer. Wilhelm made use of the library of Joseph Paul von Cobres (1749–1823), a wealthy Catholic banker from Göggingen who also introduced Wilhelm as a member of the Berlin Natural History Society in 1797. Wilhelm's works went to 19 volumes (with a total of 1469 illustrations), and it was supplemented to 25 volumes after his death by Wilhelm's cousin, deacon Gerhard Adam Neuhofer (1773-1816) and the project was carried on until 1828. From 1808 it was reprinted by Pichler of Vienna. From 1798 a French translation of "Insects" at Haag in Basel (3 vols.). It was published at a reasonable price and Wilhelm's intention had been to make the work available to the "non-wealthy" and make it more accessible. Three volumes (titled Unterhaltungen ueber den Menschen) covered human anatomy and physiology. It included descriptions of freaks like the conjoined sisters Helen and Judith (1701–1723) based possibly on a 1773 work by Statius Müller. He traced human ancestry to a single pair according to the Bible and on the basis of this argued for the equality of peoples and made an appeal for the abolition of slavery and called for respect towards other peoples and cultures. He however described a scale of civilization with Europeans placed on a higher level. The Bavarian Government awarded him a Great Gold Medal of Honor and made the books official reading material for public schools. Nearly 1328 subscribers were noted for the book and around 2512 copies had been made.
