= Caroline Pichler =

Austrian historical novelist (1769–1843)

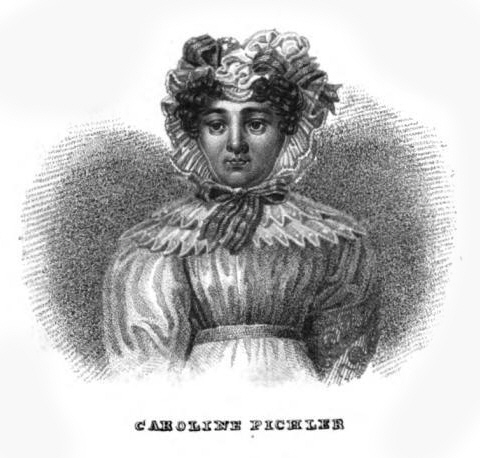
Caroline Pichler, 1830

Caroline Pichler, also spelled Karoline, (7 September 1769 – 9 July 1843) was an Austrian historical novelist.

== Life ==
She was born in Vienna to Hofrat Franz Sales von Greiner (1730–1798) and his wife Charlotte, née Hieronymus (1739–1815). In the 1770s Charlotte would visit Maria Theresa and often bring her daughter Caroline with her. As a young girl, Caroline met Haydn and was a pupil of Mozart, who regularly performed music at the Greiners' residence. She was taught Latin, French, Italian, and English in her youth. At age 12, Pichler published her first poem.

In 1796, Caroline married Andreas Pichler, a government official, and the brother of Anton Pichler, the owner of the Viennese publisher and printer A. Pichlers Witwe & Sohn. Through her husband's encouragement and her own desires she led a salon for many years that was the center of the literary life in the Austrian capital. Her salon was frequented by Beethoven, Schubert (who set some of her poems), Friedrich Schlegel, Louise Brachmann, and Grillparzer, among many others, from 1802 to 1824. She died in Vienna in 1843, according to some sources by suicide. 50 years after her death she was reburied at the Zentralfriedhof.

Her early works, Olivier, first published anonymously (1802), Idyllen (1803) and Ruth (1805), though displaying considerable talent, were immature. She made her mark in historical romance, and the first of her novels of this class, Agathokles (1808), written as an answer to Edward Gibbon's disparagement of Christianity in his The History of the Decline and Fall of the Roman Empire, attained great popularity. Among her other novels may be mentioned Die Belagerung Wiens (1824); Die Schweden in Prag (1827); Die Wiedereroberung Wiens (1829) and Henriette von England (1832). Her last work was Zeitbilder (1840). Her autobiography in four volumes, Denkwürdigkeiten aus meinem Leben (Memorables from my Life) was published posthumously in 1844. Pichler's Complete Works consist of 60 volumes. One of her essays was abbreviated and included in an anthology of German Women writers for German language learners.

== Selected works ==
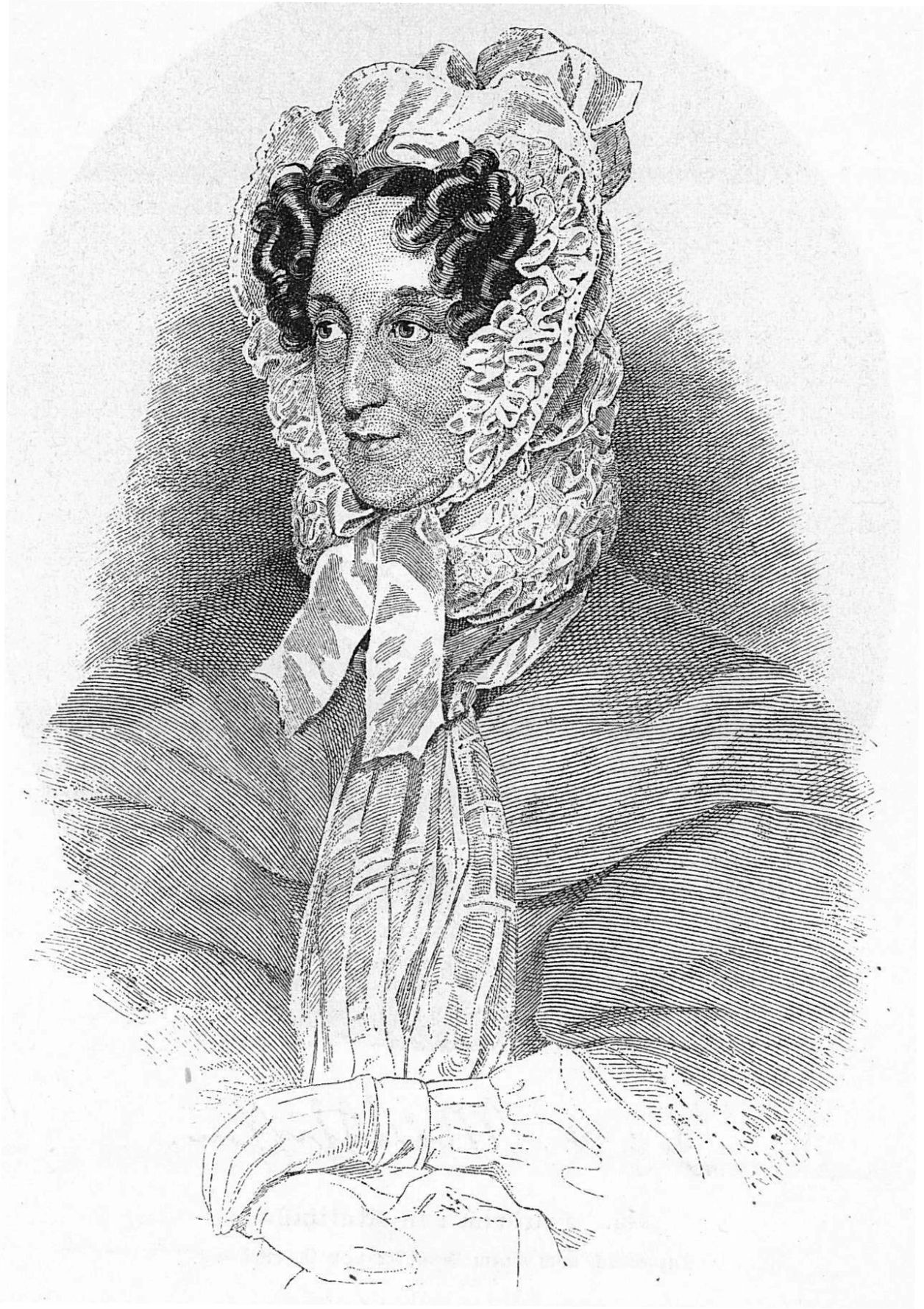
Caroline Pichler

Caroline Pichler's published works as cited by An Encyclopedia of Continental Women Writers.

- Gleichnisse, 1800.
- Idyllen, 1803.
- Lenore, 2 parts 1804.
- Ruth, 1805.
- Agathokles, 1808.
- Die Grafen von Hohenberg, 2 volumes 1811.
- Biblische Idyllen, 1812.
- Frauenwürde, 4 volumes 1818.
- Gedichte, 1822.
- Die Belagerung Wiens, 3 volumes 1824.
- Die Schweden in Prag, 1827.
- Die Wiedereroberung von Ofen, 2 volumes, 1829.
- Friedrich der Streitbare, 4 volumes 1831.
- Elisabeth von Guttenstein, 1835.
- Denkwürdigkeiten aus meinen Leben, 4 volumes 1844.
- Ferdinand II, 1816.
