= Carl Wilhelm Juch =

German physician, pharmacist, and herbalist

Carl Wilhelm Juch (30 November 1774 – 9 March 1821) was a German physician, pharmacist, and herbalist. He served as a professor of medicine and chemistry at the University of Altdorf and at the Augsburg Polytechnic.

== Life and work ==
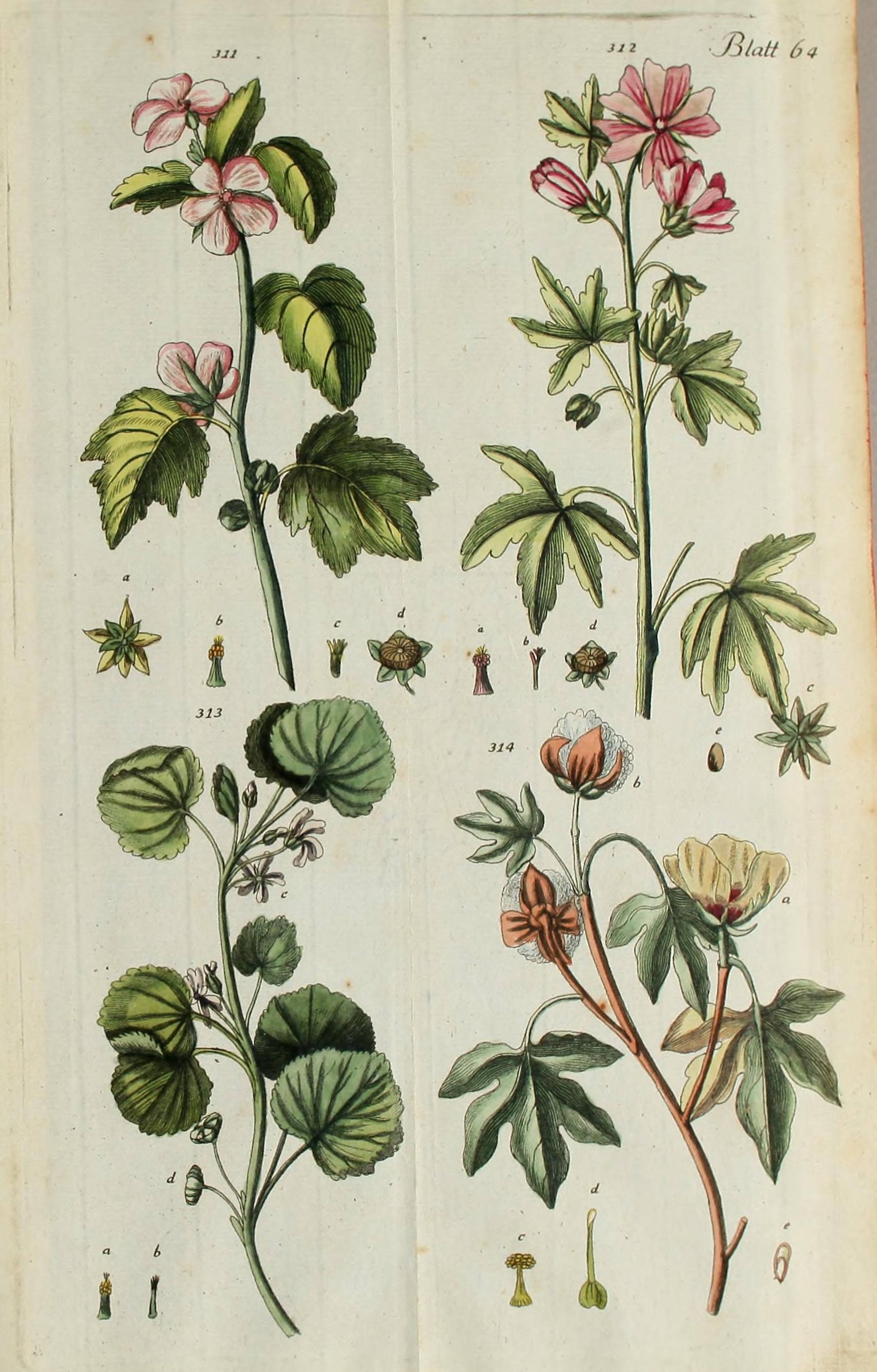
Plate from Handbuch der pharmaceutischen Botanik (1804)

Juch was born in Mühlhausen where his father Carl Christian Wilhelm Juch was town physician. At a young age he decided to study pharmacy and began to apprentice at the age of twelve. He then studied medicine and philosophy with Johann Bartholomäus Trommsdorff and Johann Christian Lossius and then joined the University of Jena. His professors at Jena included Christoph Wilhelm Hufeland, Christian Gottfried Gruner, and Lorenz Suckow and he became especially interested in chemistry. He then went to the University of Berlin where he studied under Christian Ludwig Mursinna, Sigismund Friedrich Hermbstädt and Johann Gottlieb Walter. In Berlin he met Johann Bartholomäus von Siebold and travelled with him through Germany before returning to work at Würzburg under Siebold's father, the physician Carl Caspar von Siebold. He received a doctorate in 1800 and then travelled through Europe. He became a professor of medicine and chemistry at the University of Altdorf in 1801, succeeding Johann Christian Conrad Ackermann. In 1805 he moved out to teach at a Munich high school. In 1808 he moved to Augsburg Polytechnic and retired in 1816–17.

Juch published extensively in natural history periodicals, was a member of the mineralogical society of Jena and the botanical society in Regensburg. He also published a translation of Pharmacopoea Borussica with a commentary.
