= Georg Lorenz Bauer =

German theologian

- Born: 1755; Hiltpoltstein
- Died: 1806; Heidelberg
- Occupation(s): Lutheran Minister; Theologian
- Spouse: Margaretha Barbara Schütz
- Children: 10
- Parent(s): Georg Wolfgang Bauer (1710-1767); Margaretha Salome Bauer-Drechsel

Georg Lorenz Bauer (14 August 1755 – 13 January 1806) was a German Lutheran Theologian, and writer on his subject.

== Life ==
Georg Lorenz Bauer was born in Hiltpoltstein, a small market town some 25 km (15 miles) to the north-east of Nuremberg. He was born sixth of his parents' eight recorded children. His father, Georg Wolfgang Bauer (1710-1767) was the local Protestant minister: his mother, born Margaretha Salome Drechsel, was the daughter of another Protestant minister.

His school career included a period at St. Lorenz, Nuremberg where he acquired an early interest in Oriental languages, on which he was able to build after 1772 when he moved on to the University of Altdorf. Here he studied both Theology and, possibly with even greater enthusiasm, Oriental Languages under the noted orientalist Johann Andreas Michael Nagel. He received his Magister degree in 1775 and a year later was appointed a "Morning preacher" at the St Margaret's Chapel in Nuremberg Castle. In 1786 he took a teaching position at the city's St. Sebaldus school, becoming deputy head in 1787. In 1789, following the death in 1788 of Johann Andreas Michael Nagel, Bauer was appointed to succeed the mentor from his university days at Altdorf as Professor for Eloquence/Rhetoric, Oriental Languages and Morality.

In 1805 he moved to take up a position at Heidelberg University as Professor for Oriental Literature and Biblical criticism. Heidelberg was being combined into a new Grand Duchy of Baden and Bauer's appointment came as part of a larger reconfiguration of the city's venerable university. Bauer was appointed to the university post despite a warning by Jung-Stilling that he had a "scandalous past", a reference to Bauer's known criticism of religious revelationism. In 1805 Bauer also became "Kirchenrat", an important administrative position in the church locally.

On 12 or 13 January 1806, shortly after relocating to Heidelberg, Georg Lorenz Bauer died.

== Family ==
Georg Lorenz Bauer was married to Margaretha Barbara Schütz of Nuremberg. In 1802 four of their ten recorded children were still alive.

== Assessment ==
Bauer was known as an enlightenment theologian who applied historical-critical method, without regard to any pre-existing dogma, to Old and New Testament study. His position was that a critical elimination of anything mystical or legendary would bring to light the essential timeless truth of the core universality of the bible.

== Publications (not a complete list) ==
- Historisch-kritische Einleitung in das Alte Testament 1794 (3rd edition 1806)
- Theologie des Alten Testaments 1796 (with "supplements" 1801)
- Entwurf einer Hermeneutik des Alten Testaments und NT. 1799
- Theologie des Neuen Testaments 4 Vols., 1800–02
- Hebräische Mythologie des Alten Testaments und Neuen Testaments mit Parallelen aus der Mythologie anderer Völker, vornehmlich der # Griechen u. Römer. 2 Vols., 1802/03
- Biblische Moral des Alten Testaments 1803/05
- Biblische Moral des Neuen Testaments, 1804/05
- Breviarium theologiae biblicae. 1803
