= Paul Joüon =

French Jesuit priest, hebraist and Semitic language specialist

- Born: 6 February 1871; Nantes, France
- Died: 18 February 1940 (aged 69); Nantes, France
- Awards: Volney Prize

Academic work
- Discipline: Hebrew studies theology
- Institutions: Saint Joseph University of Beirut; Pontifical Biblical Institute
- Main interests: Book of Ruth
- Notable works: A Grammar of Biblical Hebrew

Paul Joüon (6 February 1871 – 18 February 1940 in Nantes) was a French Jesuit priest, hebraist, Semitic language specialist and member of the Pontifical Biblical Institute. Author of a philological and exegetical commentary on the Book of Ruth (1924), he also wrote A Grammar of Biblical Hebrew for which he received the Volney Prize from the Institute of France. First published in 1923, Joüon's grammar, enjoying numerous editions as well as an English translation, continues to serve as an important reference to this day.

== Life ==
Paul Joüon was born on 26 February 1871 in Nantes (Loire-Atlantique), France. He entered the Compagnie de Jésus in 1890. Paul Joüon is the son of Eugène Joüon, a notary and lawyer in Nantes, and Marguerite Billeheust de Saint-Georges. He is the brother of the Jesuit René Joüon.

He pursued advanced studies in Semitic philology, primarily in Paris, before undertaking a period of private study and convalescence in Cairo from 1896 to 1898. He subsequently continued his theological formation in Beirut from 1898 to 1901, after which he returned to Paris.

From 1907 to 1914, he taught Hebrew philology at the Faculté orientale and the Jesuit Séminaire of the Saint Joseph University of Beirut when the Turks closed the university. Then he taught, from 1915 to 1919 at the Pontifical Biblical Institute in Rome. Due to poor health, he was forced to give up teaching and devote himself exclusively to research. Consequently, he conducted research in Rome from 1919 to 1926 and in Paris from 1926 to 1940.

Joüon was the student of French rabbi and orientalist Mayer Lambert.

He died in Nantes, where he lived at 9 Rue Dugommier, and was buried on February 20, 1940, at the Miséricorde Cemetery (Aisle Q, Row 1).

== Publications ==
Books

- Joüon, Paul (1909). Le Cantique des Cantiques. Commentaire philologique et exégétique (in French). Paris: Éditeur G. Beauchesne.
- ————— (1921). 'Libri Ruth textum hebraicum' ad usum scholarum edidit (in French). Rome: Pontificium Institutum Biblicum.
- ————— (1923). Grammaire de l'hébreu biblique (in French). Rome: Éditrice Pontificio Istituto Biblico.
- ————— (1924). Ruth. Commentaire philologique et exégétique (in French). Rome: Institut Biblique Pontifical.
- ————— (1930). L'Évangile de Notre-Seigneur Jésus-Christ (in French). Paris: Éditeur G. Beauchesne. (Translation and commentary on the Greek text, taking into account the Semitic substrate).

Articles

- Articles on Semitic philology (in Mélanges de la Faculté Orientale de Beyrouth, Orientalia, and Biblica).

Published after his death

- ————— (1947). Semkowski, Louis (ed.). Grammaire de l'hébreu biblique (in French) (2. corrected ed.).
- ————— (1965). Boccaccio, Pietro (ed.). Grammaire de l'hébreu biblique (in French) (Corrected photomechanical ed.). Rome, Piazza della Pilotta: Institut Biblique Pontifical.
- ————— (1987). Grammaire de l'hébreu biblique (2. Photomechanical reprinted ed.). ISBN 8876534989.
- ————— (1991). Muraoka, Takamitsu (ed.). A Grammar of Biblical Hebrew. Translated by Muraoka, Takamitsu (1 ed.). Rome: Institut Biblique Pontifical.
- ————— (1993). Muraoka, Takamitsu (ed.). A Grammar of Biblical Hebrew. Translated by Muraoka, Takamitsu (Reprint of the first, with corrections ed.). Rome: Institut Biblique Pontifical.
- ————— (1996). Grammaire de l'hébreu biblique (2. reprinted ed.).
- ————— (1996). Muraoka, Takamitsu (ed.). A Grammar of Biblical Hebrew. Translated by Muraoka, Takamitsu (Second reprint ed.). Rome: Institut Biblique Pontifical. ISBN 8876535950.
- ————— (2007). Grammaire de l'hébreu biblique. Fuori Collana PIB Series (in French) (2. reprinted ed.). Pontificio Istituto Biblico. ISBN 8876534989.

== See also ==
- Study of the Hebrew language
