= Gottfried Mascov =

German jurist

Gottfried Mascov (also Mascovius: 26 September 1698 – 5 October 1760) was a German jurist and university professor.

== Life ==
Gottfried Mascov was born in Danzig. At that time, Danzig was a large semi-autonomous trading city on the Baltic coast of the Polish–Lithuanian Commonwealth. The city at this time was multi-cultural: Mascov's family was prominent in the German speaking merchant community, his grandparents having fled to Danzig from the west during the Thirty Years' War. Gottfried Mascov's elder brother, remembered as a jurist and historian, was Johann Jacob Mascov. The boys lost their parents before reaching adulthood, and responsibility for their upbringing fell to Reinhold Schuhmacher, a maternal relative, who attended to their education.

In 1716 he enrolled at the University of Leipzig where his brother, by this time, had received his first degree and held a teaching position. Gottfried Mascov studied Jurisprudence. At the end of four years he achieved a top ranking in his law exams, after which he spent a couple of years as a practicing lawyer. He moved on to Altdorf. Between 1724 and 1729 he supported himself as a private tutor, teaching Roman law, Antiquities and Natural Law. In 1728 he received a licentiate in law and in 1729 a doctorate in philosophy from Altdorf. By 1728 he was based back in Leipzig.

By this time Mascov had already, during the course of his travels, visited the prestigious University of Harderwijk, and in an ingratiating letter dated July 1728 he received an offer to take a law professorship there, backed up by a stipend of 700 florins. His time at Harderwijk was a success: the institution flourished and it is reported that he succeeded in attracting some of the best brains to the "Guelders Academy" (as it was also known) from the German and English nobility. In 1730 he served a term as rector. In 1735 he was appointed a Hofrat". Despite his success, by 1735 he had decided that his time there had come to an end both for financial reasons and because he believed the damp climate was damaging to his eyesight. He therefore accepted an invitation to move to the new University of Göttingen where he held a full law professorship between 1735 and 1739. The next few years were particularly productive for Mascov in terms of his published output. However, at Göttingen he acquired enemies among his fellow academics, and in 1739 festering enmities erupted into a heated difference of opinions which turned into a fight in which he attacked three of his colleagues. His colleague Georg Christian Gebauer emerged with a badly scratched face, and a disciplinary enquiry against Mascov ended up condemning his intemperate conduct and dismissing him from his post.

He now turned to his brother, whose entire academic career had unfolded at Leipzig, where by now he also held important court appointments and a post as State librarian. Gottfried Mascov returned to Leipzig, now as a senior academic ("Privatdozent") for Roman Law and Natural Law, later, between 1748 and 1760, serving as a full professor at the university.

Gottfried Mascov died at Leipzig on 5 October 1760.

== An appreciation ==
His academic research was characterised by thoroughness and precision ("scribebat non multa – sed multum"); he knew how to express his thoughts with well chosen words and in lucid style, as a result of which he was esteemed by contemporaries as a leading exponent of "elegant jurisprudence" ("als eleganter Civilist") Even as a youth he became accustomed to an independent lifestyle, and while he was not opposed to women, he remained unmarried because he feared quarrels and domestic power struggles.

== Publications (not a complete list) ==
- De sectis Sabinianorum et Proculianorum, 1724
- De Herciscundis, 1728
- De usu iuris cum scientia eiusdem coniungendo, 1735
- De paroemia iuris Germanici, 1736
- Notitia iuris et iudiciorum, 1736
- Notitia iuris et iudiciorum Brunsvico-Luneburgicorum, 1738
- De saltu Leucadio prolusio. Leipzig: Langenheim, 1754
- Oratio de usu et praestantia historiae Augustae in iure civili (published posthumously by Josias Ludwig Ernst Püttmann), 1774
- Opuscula iuridica et philologica (published posthumously by Josias Ludwig Ernst Püttmann), 1776
