= Aviva Cantor =

American journalist, lecturer and author

Aviva Cantor (born 1940) is an American journalist, lecturer and author. An advocate of feminism and the democratization of Jewish communal life, Cantor has been actively involved in promoting progressive Jewish causes for over 40 years. She was a co-founder in 1968 of the Jewish Liberation in New York, a Socialist Zionist organization, and served as founding editor of its Jewish Liberation Journal. JLP was among the first Jewish groups to advocate the two-state solution (1968).

== Biography ==
Aviva Cantor was born in 1940 and raised in the East Bronx by traditional but non-Orthodox parents who had immigrated to North America from Russia after World War I. She attended Ramaz School, an Orthodox Jewish day school, graduating from High School as Valedictorian in 1957. She spent two years studying history at the Hebrew University of Jerusalem, and graduated from Barnard College in 1961 and from the Columbia University Graduate School of Journalism in 1963. In the late 1969's she was involved in advocating for the struggle of Biafra for independence and served as vice president of the Committee for Biafran Artist and Writers.

In 1976, she initiated and co-founded Lilith, the independent Jewish Feminist quarterly magazine, which she served as co-founding editor through 1987, and for which she wrote regularly. Her articles have appeared in many publications, including Ms., The Village Voice, and Israel Horizons, and in a number of anthologies. Her reportage for the Jewish Telegraphic Agency (JTA) on the American Jewish community, Israel, her multi-part series on foreign Jewish communities—including Cuba, Argentina, Austria, Central Europe and Kenya—and her interviews with figures such as Gerhard Riegner, Carl Sagan, David Wyman, and Renee Epelbaum, were internationally syndicated.

== Writing ==
Cantor has written five alternative Passover ceremonies, the fourth of which she co-conducted in the Bedford Hills Women's Prison. The fifth one, The Egalitarian Hagada, was self-published under the auspices of Beruriah Books. It is a gender- and generation-inclusive Haggadah in non-sexist English containing all the memorable traditional elements of the seder plus poetry and prose about the Exodus, Israel, the Soviet Jewry movement, struggles for justice, the Holocaust and Resistance, and the American union movement.

After teaching the first Jewish feminist course in the Jewish Free High School in 1972, she compiled, edited and annotated several editions of The Jewish Woman, 1900–1985: A Bibliography, the 4th of which was published by BiblioPress in 1986 and 1987. Her children's book manuscript, Tamar's Cat: A Story of the Exodus, won first prize in the Sydney Taylor Children's Book Manuscript Contest of the Association of Jewish Libraries in 1991. She is also the author of several plays, including Esther and the Three Fools: A Feminist Purimshpiel; Moses and Tziporah with the Pesky Ex-Slaves in the Desert; and Hamlet's Secrets, a comedy.

In 1995, Harper San Francisco published her major 548-page work, Jewish Women/Jewish Men: the Legacy of Patriarchy in Jewish Life, a feminist exploration of Jewish history, culture and psychology (which has 100 pages of endnotes). The work puts traditional and modern Jewish life under a feminist microscope.

One of her central theses is that the needs for Jewish survival in the "national emergency" of 2,000 years of exile under oppressive and dangerous conditions necessitated the transformation of local communities into milieus informed by the feminist values of non-violence, cooperation, interdependence, compassion, and consensus. The ideal Jewish man changed "from macho to mentsch" through the outlawing of violence of all kinds and the redefinition of masculinity as learning and scholarship. At the same time, women were allowed a considerable amount of leeway in assertiveness, but only if it was in the interests of communal survival. She was trained to be an "altruistic-assertive enabler" (in the common, traditional meaning of the word "enabler" i.e., facilitator). Men, of course, never ceased to dominate the community, decide on its policy and laws, and choose its leadership (class played a role here).

Cantor believes that this successful transformation of roles and communal life proves that men's instinct for violence, even if it turns out to be genetic, can be overcome if men and women are sufficiently motivated and conscious of the justice of a peaceful, egalitarian world, in the spirit of the prophet Isaiah's vision.

== Other activities ==
Cantor is also active in the animal protectionist movement and is Vice President of "CHAI: Concern for Helping Animals in Israel," founded by Nina Natelson in 1984 to assist the Israeli animal welfare community in improving conditions for domestic animals in a country with only a few SPCAs and many immigrant communities with no tradition of animal protection and an ongoing war situation. It drafted Israel's animal protection law; conducted several humane education programs (including one for Jewish and Arab children at the Tel Aviv SPCA), site of the IB. Singer Humane Education Center which it built; and held important conferences, including one for educators on the links between the abuse of animals, domestic violence, and the criminal behavior of adults who tortured animals as children, and another on alternatives to the use of animals in experimentation.

CHAI built a shelter in Tiberias, maintains a mobile spay-neuter program and a horse rehabilitation program. It and its Israeli sister organization, HAKOL CHAI, rescued countless dogs and cats hurt or abandoned in the attacks on Sderot. The late Rep. Tom Lantos, who served on CHAI's Advisory Board, was a warm supporter of its work, as was Nobel Prize winner Isaac Bashevis Singer. Cantor wrote a 10-lesson Humane Education unit drawing entirely on Jewish sources, which forbade cruelty to animals (though Judaism permitted slaughtering for food, Jewish law required that the process was to be as close to painless as possible; this situation does not largely obtain today, especially in South America).

In the 1980s, she initiated an ultimately successful Women's Appeal for the release of Soviet Prisoner of Conscience Ida Nudel.

Cantor also is a member of the advisory board of the Remember the Women Institute

== Personal life ==
Cantor was married for 38 years to journalist Murray Zuckoff, a self-described "revolutionary," Socialist Zionist and crusading investigative journalist (reporter for the Paterson Morning Call and editor of the JTA), who fought for truth and justice with his pen. He was also a devoted teacher at CUNY. Zuckoff loved Israel, Yiddish, cats. books, music, folk art and Star Trek. He died in 2004. Cantor also composes liturgical music and photographs her cat as a hobby.

== Bibliography ==
- Cantor Zuckoff, Aviva. Jewish Liberation Hagada, New York: Jewish Liberation Project, 1971, Second Edition, with Epstein, Itzhak and Kirschen, Jerry.
- Cantor, Aviva. The Jewish Woman, 1900–1985: A Bibliography. New York, NY: Biblio Press, 1985, 1986.
- Cantor, Aviva: The Egalitarian Hagada. New York: Beruriah Books, 1991, 1992, 1994.
- Cantor, Aviva. Jewish Women/Jewish Men: The Legacy of Patriarchy in Jewish Life. San Francisco: Harper San Francisco, 1995.
