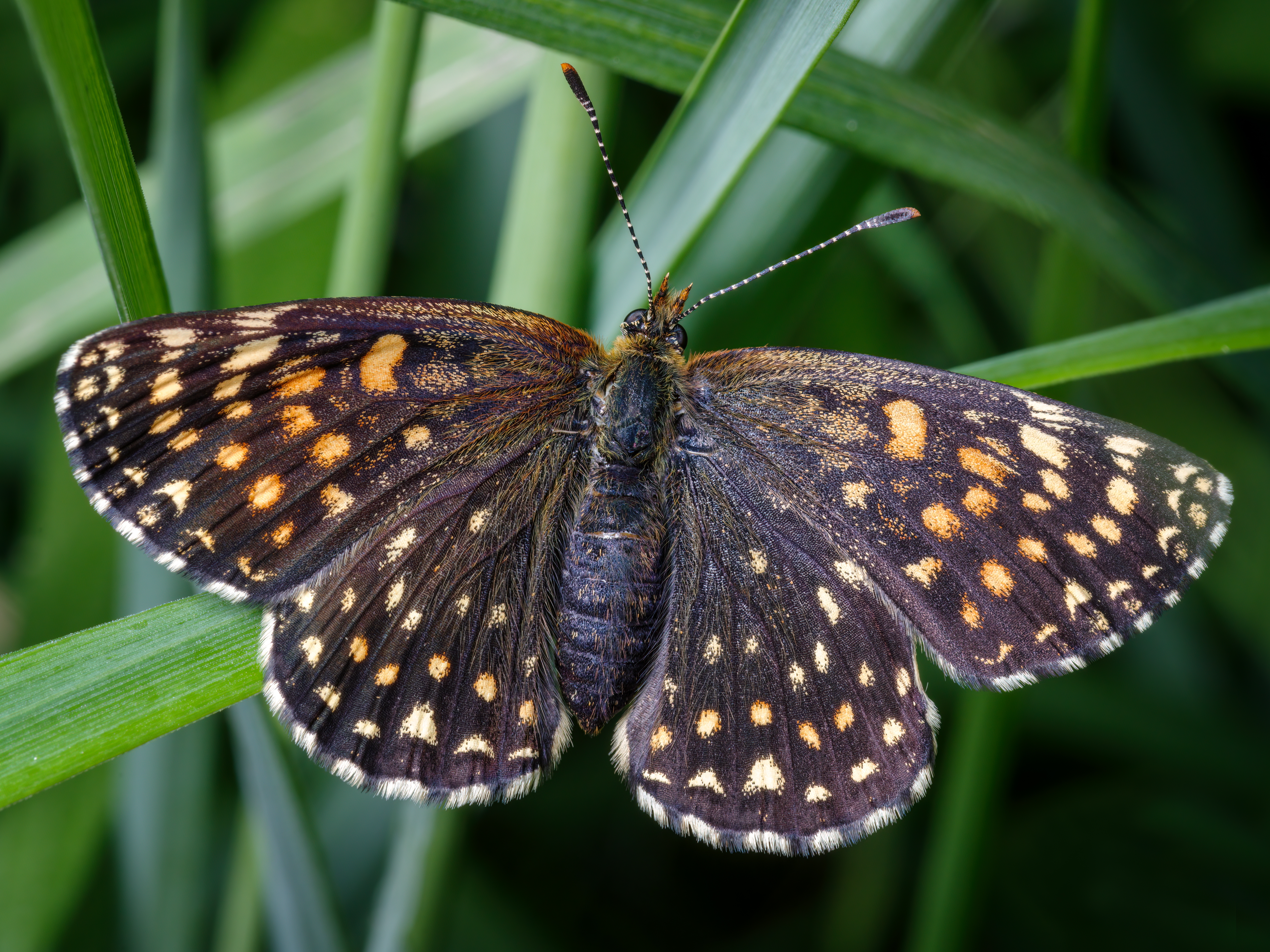
- Female upperside
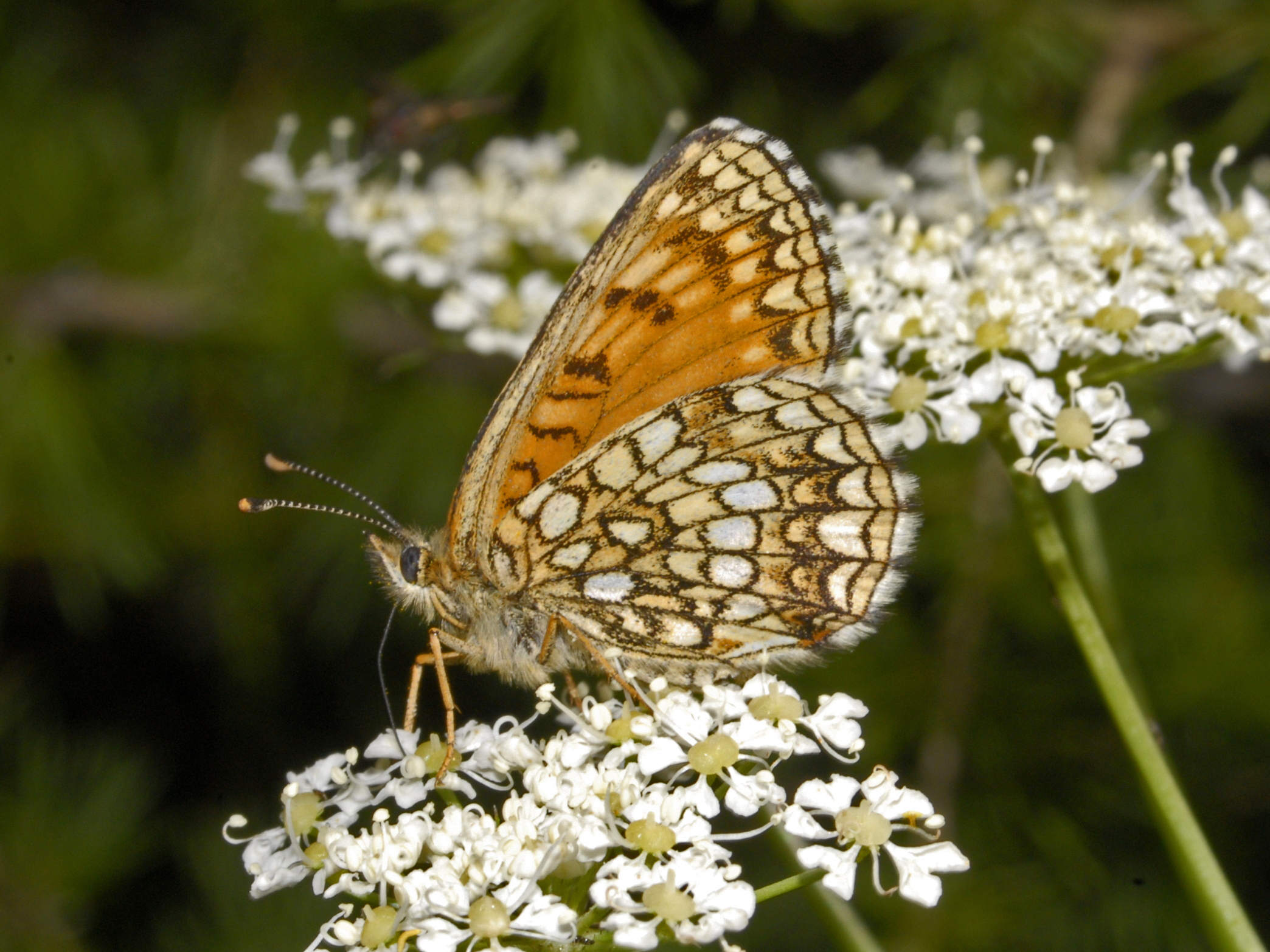
- Underside

Scientific classification
- Kingdom: Animalia
- Phylum: Arthropoda
- Class: Insecta
- Order: Lepidoptera
- Family: Nymphalidae
- Genus: Melitaea
- Species: M. diamina

Binomial name
- Melitaea diamina (Lang, 1789)

Synonyms
- List: Papilio dictynna Esper, 1778; Melitaea vernetensis Rondou, 1902; Melitaea aduaticana Cabeau, 1903; Melitaea seminigra Muschamp, 1905; Melitaea progressiva Ksienschopolski, 1911; Melitaea subtusocellata Reverdin, 1914; Melitaea moffartsi Lambillion, 1919; Melitaea semidetrita Hartig, 1924; Melitaea perrhoio Reverdin, 1927; Melitaea codinai De Sagarra, 1932; Melitaea luciferina Agenjo, 1934; Melitaea subnavarina Pionneau, 1937; Melitaea ligata Caruel, 1944

= Melitaea diamina =

False heath fritillary

Species of butterfly

Melitaea diamina, the false heath fritillary, is a butterfly of the family Nymphalidae.

== Subspecies ==
Subspecies include:

- Melitaea diamina alpestris Fruhstorfer, 1917
- Melitaea diamina badukensis Alberti, 1969 (Caucasus)
- Melitaea diamina codinai Sagarra, 1932 (Spain)
- Melitaea diamina diamina (Lang, 1789)
- Melitaea diamina erycina (Lederer, 1853) (Altai)
- Melitaea diamina erycinides Staudinger, 1892
- Melitaea diamina hebe (Borkhausen, 1793)
- Melitaea diamina vernetensis Rondou, 1902

== Distribution and habitat ==
This species is widespread in central and southern Europe (from northern Spain, southern and eastern France, Italy and eastwards into southern Scandinavia and Bulgaria), southern Siberia, north-eastern China, southern Ussuri, Korea and Japan. These butterflies live in damp flowery meadows, woodland margins and rides from low to alpine levels up to 2200 m.

== Description ==
Melitaea diamina has a wingspan of 36–42 mm. Females are larger than males. This medium-sized species is highly variable in extent of black markings and in the diversification of ground colour on the upperside of the wings. The upper side of the wings usually is black brown, with yellowish-orange ground colour and white chequered fringe. On the upperside of the hindwings there are very heavy dark markings. Sometimes it may be uniformly dark brown. The underside of the hindwings shows a submarginal series of white half moons and a few bands of creamy-white and orange checkers.

== Description in Seitz ==
M. dictynna Esp. (= corythalia Hhn.) (67b). Above much darker than the various previous species, the black markings heavy, in the male only some small rounded spots on the forewing and a submarginal row of dots on the hindwing reddish yellow, in the female the outer half of the upperside variegated with ivory yellow and ochreous spots, the fringes being white in both sexes. Beneath marked as in the athalia, but the bands of the hindwing more chestnut. Throughout Europe (except the extreme north and south, as well as Great Britain), also in North and Central Asia eastward to the coasts of the Pacific, being in the west abundant almost everywhere, rarer in the east and north. Particularly light resp. dark specimens are not rare and, according to Spuler, should be named ab. corythalia and ab. navarina respectively. — The form erycina Stgr.[ Lederer not Staudinger now ssp. qv. (67c), from Amurland and the Altai, is above almost exactly like European specimens, the spots being somewhat paler; beneath more variegated, the brown submarginal band being paler below the costa but not interrupted; the specimens from northern Amurland a little smaller. Not plentiful anywhere (Graeser). — erycinides Stgr.[ now ssp. qv.] (67c) is a large erycinides race from Central Asia and certain places farther east, the upperside being spotted with dark in the male and with whitish yellow in the female, while the submarginal band of the underside is much darker brown than in European specimens, the margin of the forewing beneath being broadly shaded with dark brown. The specimens figured are from — Larva of dictynna dark grey with yellow spines; the body with bluish dots,2 such dots on the head; on the back black longitudinal stripes. From the autumn until May on Plantago, Veronica, Valeriana, etc. Pupa silvery grey or yellowish grey, dotted with black, dorsally on the abdomen rows of small russet- yellow warts. The butterflies from June until August in swampy meadows, especially near water-ditches and in meadows in woods. They are slow fliers, perhaps the least fast among all the Melitaeas. In the high Alps they frequent the same localities as many Erebias, with which they fly together. They occur up to 10000 ft.

== Similar species ==
This species is rather similar to Melitaea varia, Melitaea parthenoides, Melitaea aurelia, Melitaea britomartis, Melitaea deione, Melitaea asteria and Melitaea athalia.

== Biology ==
This species usually has a single brood from May to July depending on the altitude. In some warmer regions it may have a second generation. Caterpillars feed on Valeriana officinalis, Valeriana sambucifolia, Valeriana dioica, Valeriana wallrothii, Filipendula ulmaria, Veronica chamaedrys, Plantago lanceolata, Melampyrum pratense, Melampyrum nemorosum, Polygonum bistorta and Patrinia species. Pupation occurs on the host plants near to the ground. Adults fly from May to September.

== Gallery ==
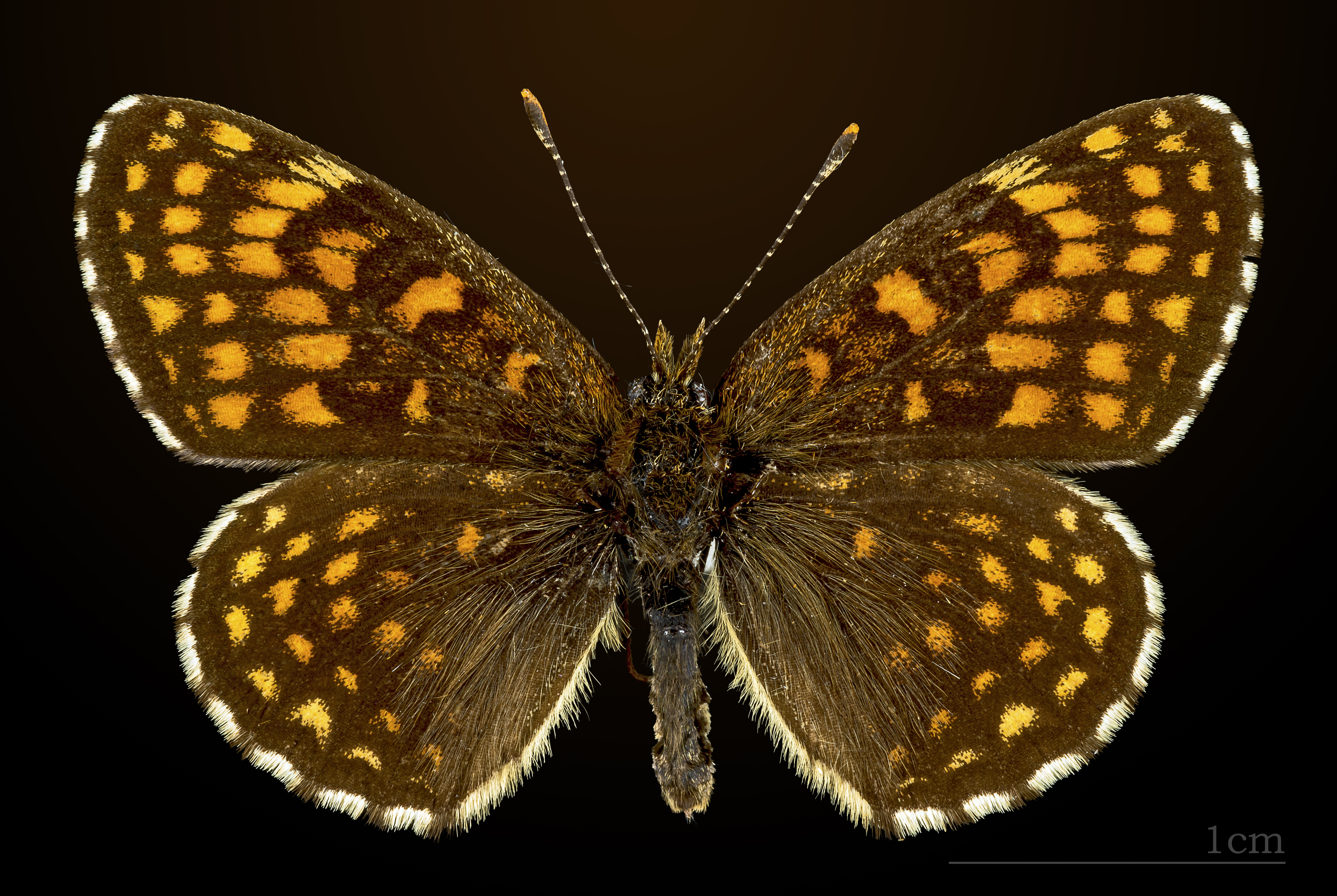
Male

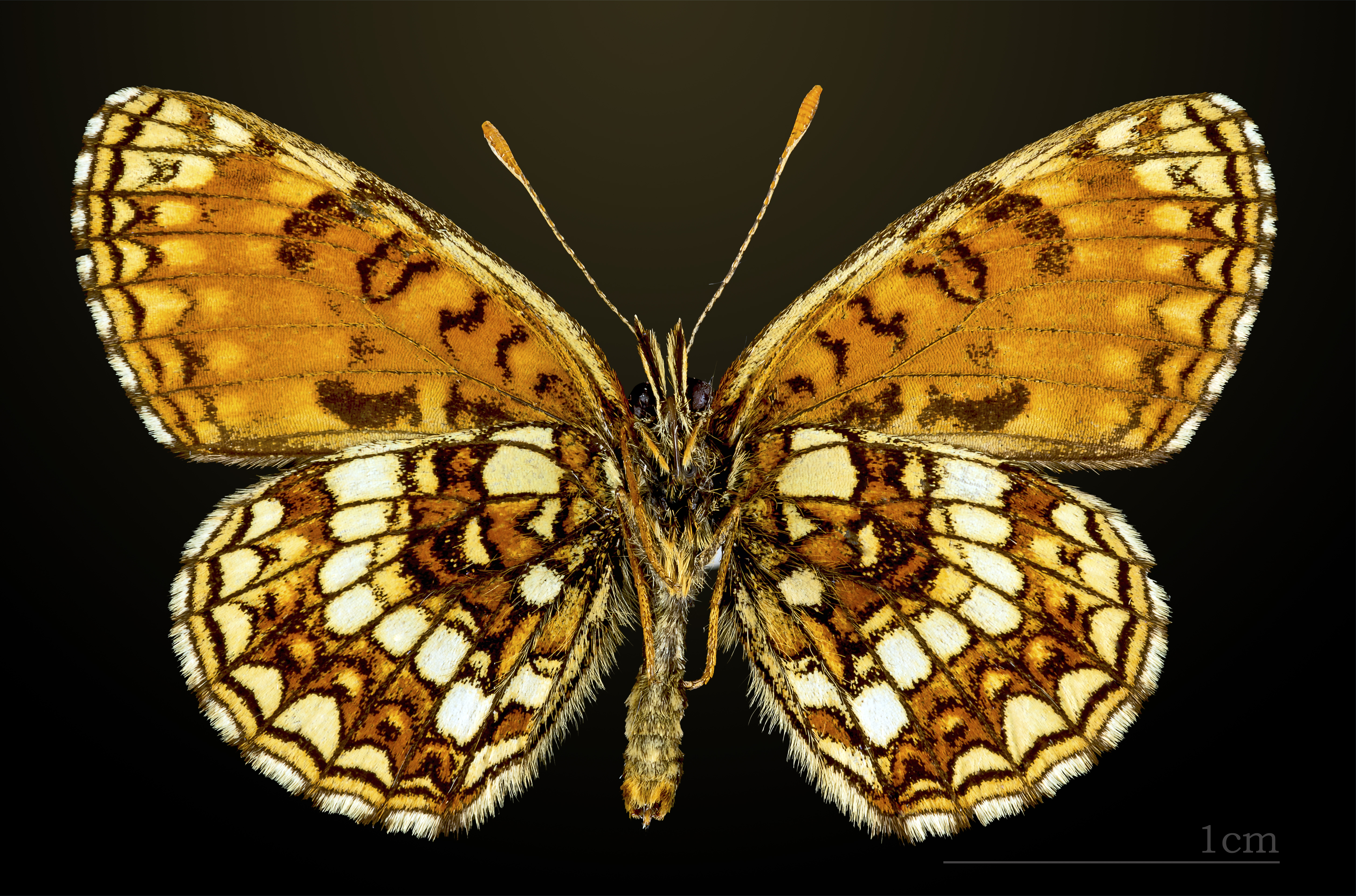
Male underside

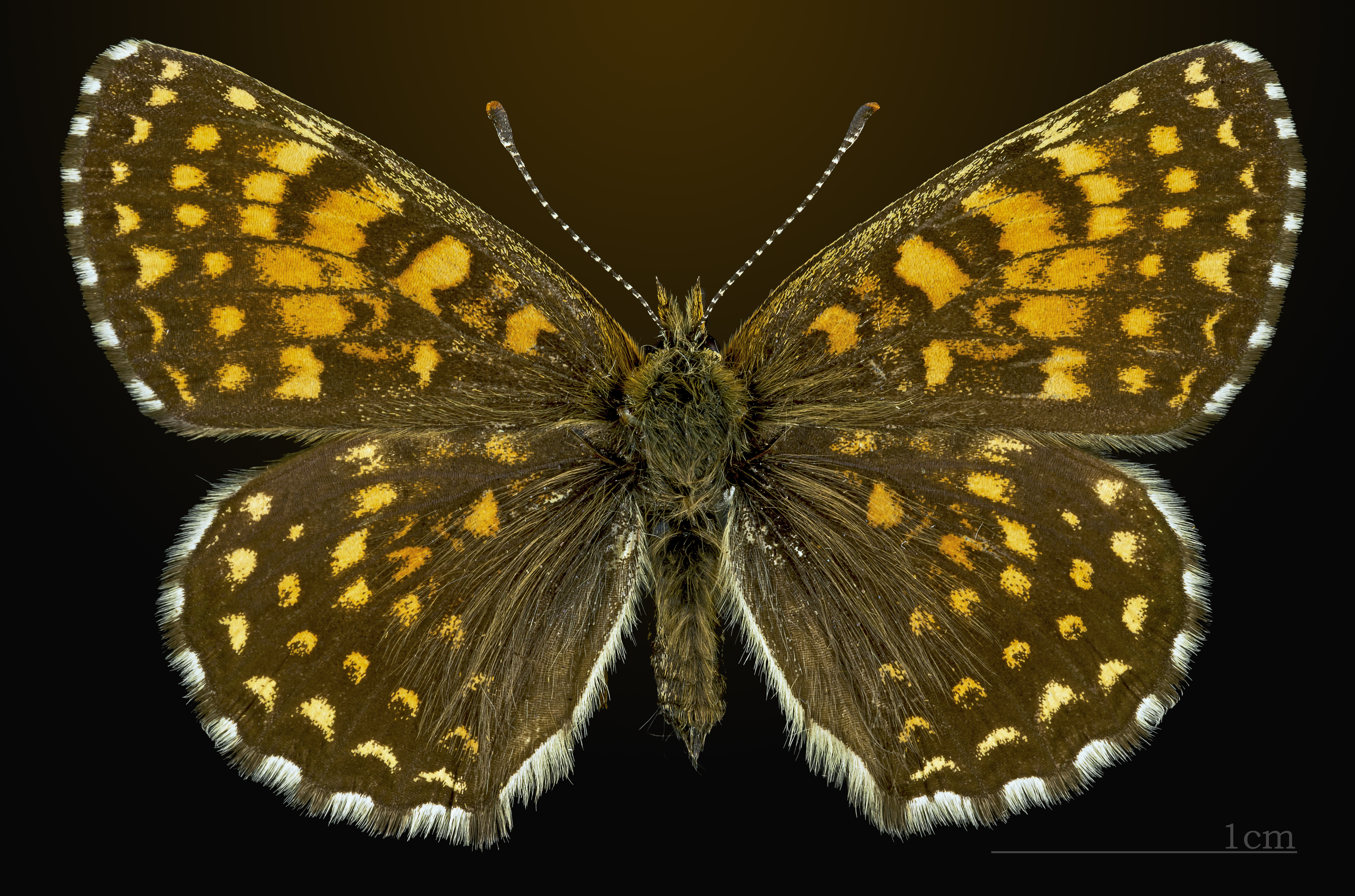
Female

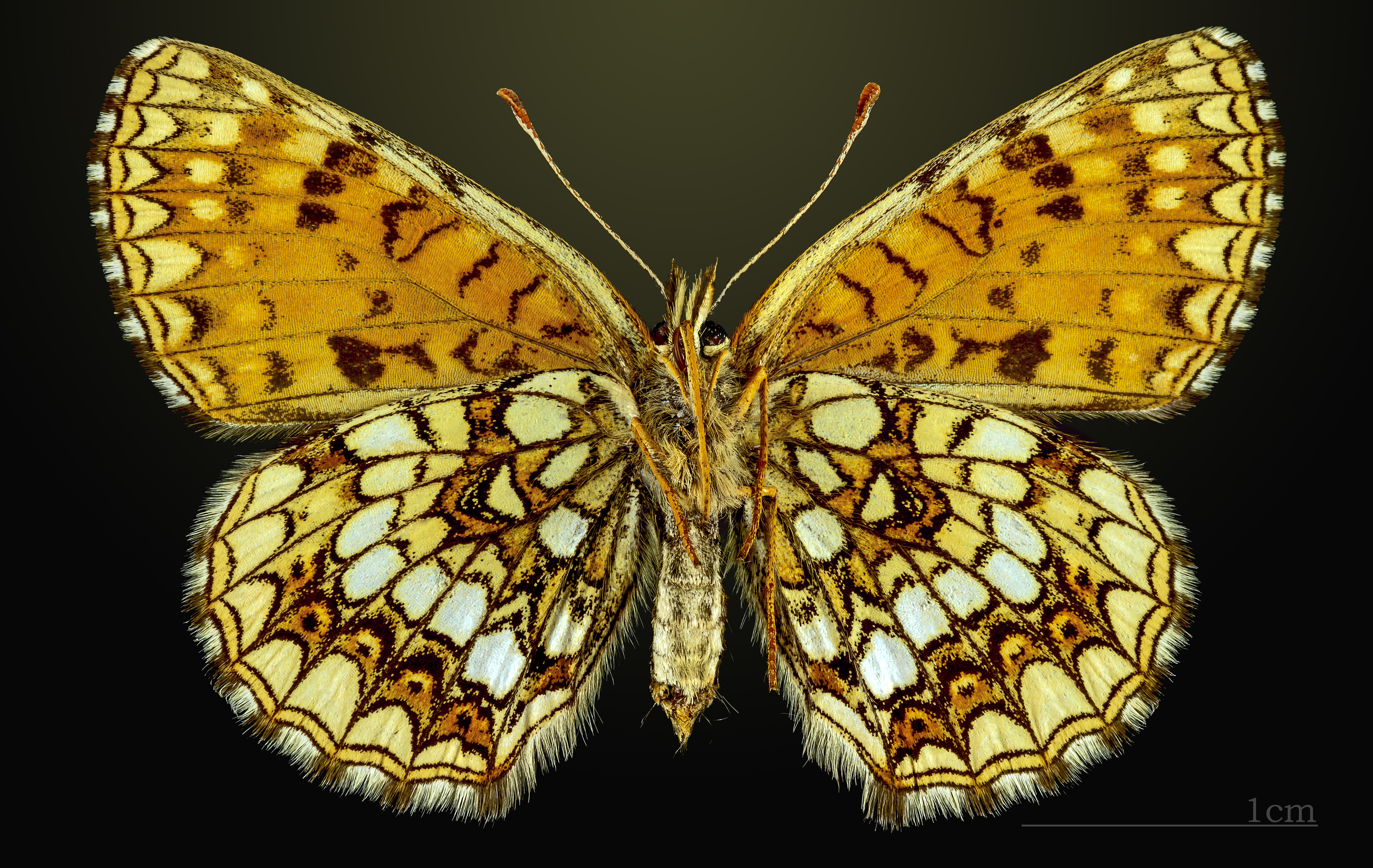
Female underside

== Bibliography ==
- Ebert, G. & E. Rennwald (1993). Die Schmetterlinge Baden-Württembergs, Bd. 1., Stuttgart (Verlag Eugen Ulmer), pp. 508–513.
- Mitchell Beazley (1981). The Mitchell Beazley Pocket Guide to Butterflies. Mitchell Beazley, London. p 76.
- Schweizerischer Bund FÜR Naturshutz [eds.] (1987). Tagfalter und ihre Lebensräume. Arten – Gefährdung – Schutz, Fotorotar AG, Egg, Zurich. pp. 220–221.
- Tom Tolman, Richard Lewington - Guide des papillons d'Europe et d'Afrique du Nord, Delachaux et Niestlé, (ISBN 978-2-603-01649-7)
