= A. Pichlers Witwe & Sohn =

Austrian publisher and printer

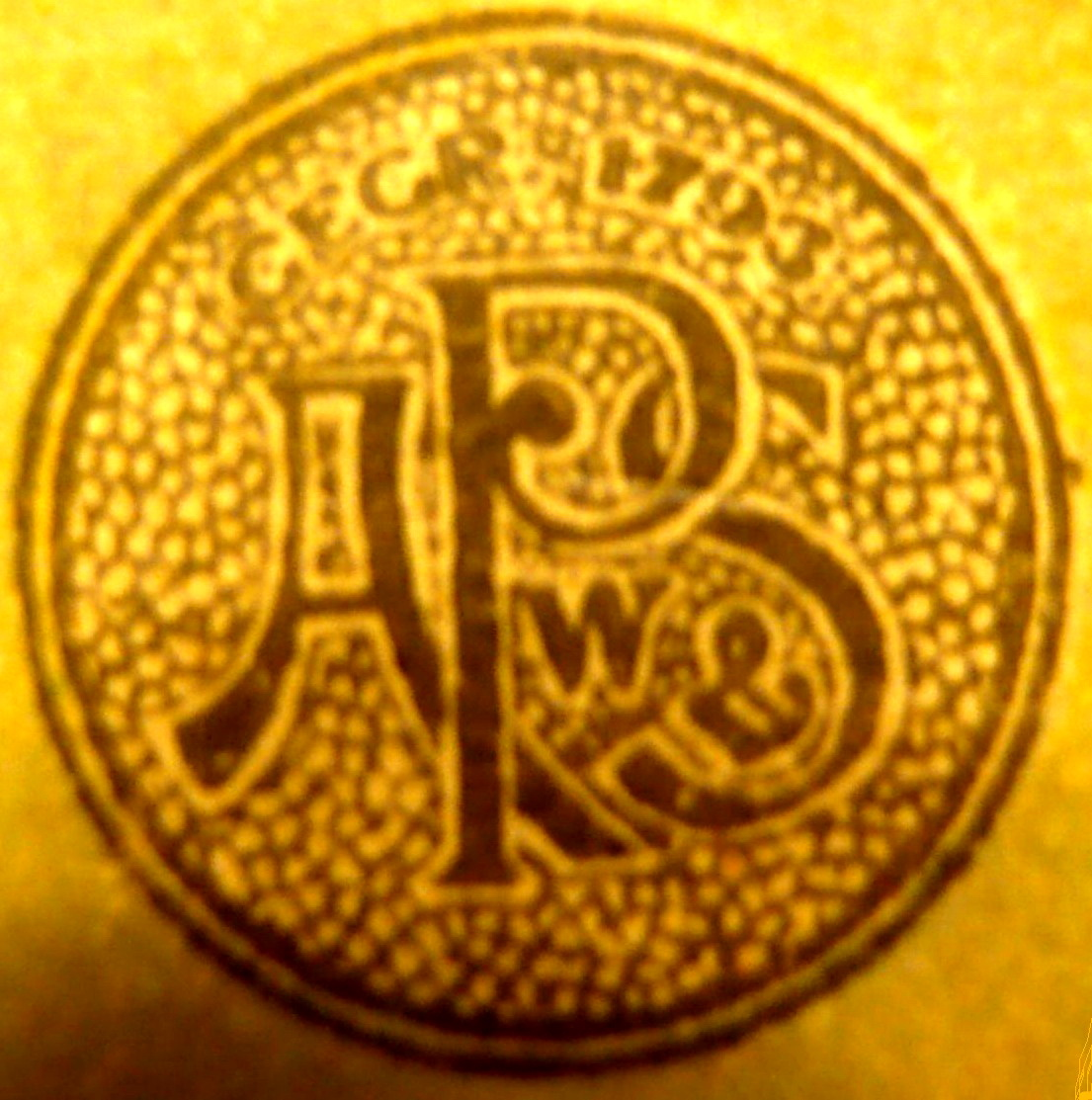
Company logo

A. Pichlers Witwe & Sohn (A. Pichler's Widow & Son) was an Austrian publisher and printer based at 2 Margaretenplatz, Vienna, founded in 1793 by Anton Andreas Pichler (14 June 1770 – 24 July 1823) who, in 1807, married Elisabeth Praller (27 April 1783 – 22 October 1865).

Anton Andreas was the son of Ulrich Joseph Pichler and Maria Theresia Bodenreitter (died 1774). Elisabeth was the daughter of Franz Praller (died 1822), a Viennese silk manufacturer, and Katharina Rafler (died 1811). She brought a dowry of 2,000 florins to the marriage as well as a house in Wien-Margareten. On Pichler's death in 1823, the business passed to his widow, who proved to be an astute businesswoman. In 1851, her son Franz Pichler, born in 1808, was recorded as her business partner, the firm then operating under the name of A. Pichlers Witwe & Sohn. In 1865, on his mother's death, Franz became the sole owner of the firm and assigned the printing section to W. Köhler. In 1874, control of the firm passed to Franz Pichler jr., born in 1845. He expanded the business by establishing a department dealing with educational aids.

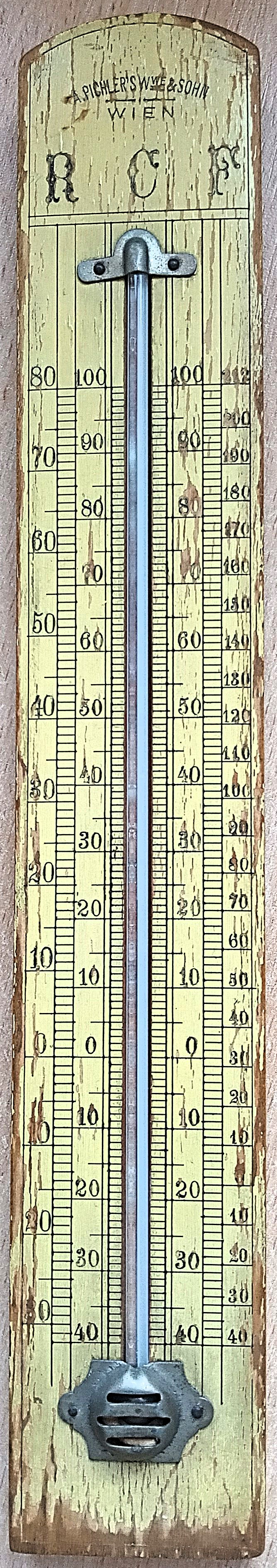
A three-scale thermometer manufactured by Pichlers Witwe and Sohn in Vienna

The first company catalogue dates from 1808 and includes several items from 1799, but the majority from 1802 to 1808 including editions of Latin classics such as those by Cornelius Nepos, Velleius Paterculus and Pomponius Mela; also a large number of plays – Lessing's works in 36 volumes, Schiller's in 28 volumes, Iffland in 16 volumes, and Shakespeare's works in 18 volumes;also the collected works of his sister-in-law, Karoline Pichler (complete edition 53 volumes, pocket edition 60 volumes), Wilhelm's Discourses on Natural History (27 volumes, 963 sheet 1,560 colored copper panels). In the early 1900s, the firm published a series of zoological wall charts created by Paul Pfurtscheller, the Austrian zoologist and natural history illustrator. As a strategy to publicize the collection, the company A. Pichlers Witwe & Sohn sent two copies of the charts to professors of zoology and anatomy at secondary and higher education institutes, science museums, and specialized scientific journals in different European countries, so that the collection would become known and feedback on the work could be received.
