= Jacob Xaver Schmuzer =

German copper engraver

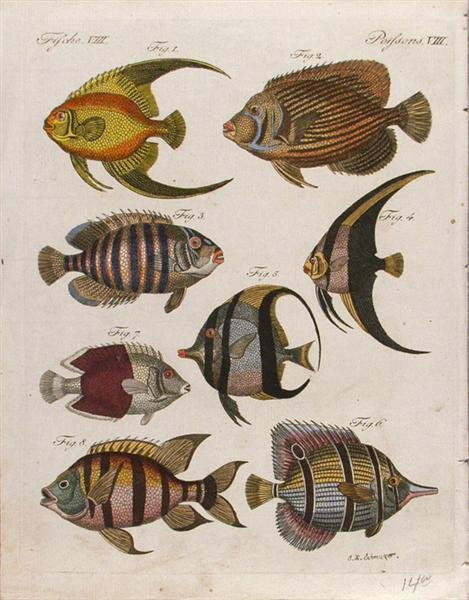

Jacob Xaver Schmuzer (1713–1775) was a German copper engraver particularly noted for his illustrating "Unterhaltungen aus der Naturgeschichte" ('Discourse on Natural History'), the monumental multi-volume work of the Bavarian clergyman and naturalist from Augsburg, Gottlieb Tobias Wilhelm (1758–1822).
