= Johann Gottlieb Walter =

German physician

- Born: 1 July 1734; Königsberg
- Died: 4 January 1818 (aged 83); Berlin
- Known for: work in human anatomy, large sample collection

Johann Gottlieb Walter (1 July 1734 – 4 January 1818) was a German physician, specialising in human anatomy.

Walter was born in Königsberg. He studied in Königsberg and Berlin under Johann Friedrich Meckel von Hemsbach and Johann Nathanael Lieberkühn. He was awarded a medical degree at Frankfurt (Oder) in 1757. After Meckel's death, he became professor of anatomy in Berlin in 1774.

Walter started and maintained a large collection and museum of anatomical samples, which was bought for 100.000 Thaler by the state, and became the foundation for the anatomical-zoological museum of the Berlin Academy.

Walter died in Berlin.

== Works ==
- Theses anatomico-physiologicae, dissertationi de emissariis Santorini praemissae (Königsberg 1757).
- Observationes anatomicae (Berlin 1775).
- Epistola anatomica de venis oculi summatim et in specie de venis oculi profundis, retinae, corporis ciliaris, capsulae lentis corporis vitrei et denique de arteria centrali retinae (Berlin 1778).
- Tabulae nervorum thoracis et abdominis (Berlin 1783), in 1804 published in English as "Plates of the Thoracic and Abdominal Nerves, Reduced from the Original as Published by Order of the Royal Academy of Sciences at Berlin".
- Myologisches Handbuch (Berlin 1795).
- Abhandlung von trocknen Knochen des menschlichen Körpers (Berlin 1798).
- Museum anatomicum per decem lustra congestum, (1805).
