= Johann Christian Lossius =

German philosopher (1743–1813)

Johann Christian Lossius (22 April 1743 in Liebstadt near Weimar – 8 January 1813 in Erfurt) was a German materialist philosopher who made contributions to philosophical anthropology, the philosophy of mind, and physiognomy.

== Life ==
Lossius studied philosophy at Jena. Appointed professor of philosophy at Erfurt in 1770, he became professor of theology there in 1772.

Lossius is considered a materialist philosopher, as he engaged in physiological explanations of mental phenomena. In his early work Physical Causes of Truth (1775), he explained the connections between bodily perception, the brain, and the mind and the implications for philosophy. He did not advocate metaphysical materialism but explained how thought and truth emerged through bodily sensation: "The soul cannot perceive anything except what its body allows it to perceive."

His other publications soon followed: Hannibal: A Physiognomic Fragment in 1776, and a treatise On the Physiognomy of Aristotle in 1777. He continued this line of inquiry with a two-volume work on neurophysiologically based logic entitled the Instruction of Sound Reason (1777). In his Something about Kantian Philosophy in relation to the Proof of the Existence of God (1789), he argued against Immanuel Kant that simple conclusions should be sufficient for philosophical justification. He also argued for defining philosophical terms and concepts through descriptions of physical and neurophysiological changes in the organs and in the context of concrete examples. In opposition to what he considered to be the overly abstract and metaphysical approaches of Christian Wolff and Kant, his four-volume work New General Philosophical Analytical Lexicon appeared in 1803.

== Works ==
- Physische Ursachen des Wahren. 1775.
- Hannibal: ein physiognomisches Fragment. 1776.
- Unterricht der gesunden Vernunft. 1777.
- Ueber die Physiognomik des Aristoteles 1777.
- Neueste philosophische Literatur. 1780.
- Etwas über Kantische Philosophie in Hinsicht des Beweises vom Daseyn Gottes. 1789.
- Neues philosophisches allgemeines Real-Lexikon.1803.
- Die Gallsche Schädellehre in critischer, psychologischer und moralischer Hinsicht.1808.

== Bibliography ==
- Heike Baranzke, Würde der Kreatur? Die Idee der Würde im Horizont der Bioethik. Würzburg (Königshausen & Neumann) 2002, da v. a. pp. 154ff.
- Manfred Beetz, Jörn Garber, Heinz Thoma (eds.), Physis und Norm: Neue Perspektiven der Anthropologie im 18. Jahrhundert. Göttingen (Wallstein) 2007.
- Hans-Peter Nowitzki, Der wohltemperierte Mensch: Aufklärungsanthropologien im Widerstreit. Berlin (Gruyter) 2003.
- Carl von Prantl, Lossius, Johann Christian. In Allgemeine Deutsche Biographie (ADB)'. Vol. 19, Duncker & Humblot, Leipzig 1884, p. 218.
