= Louise Brachmann =

German writer (1777–1822)

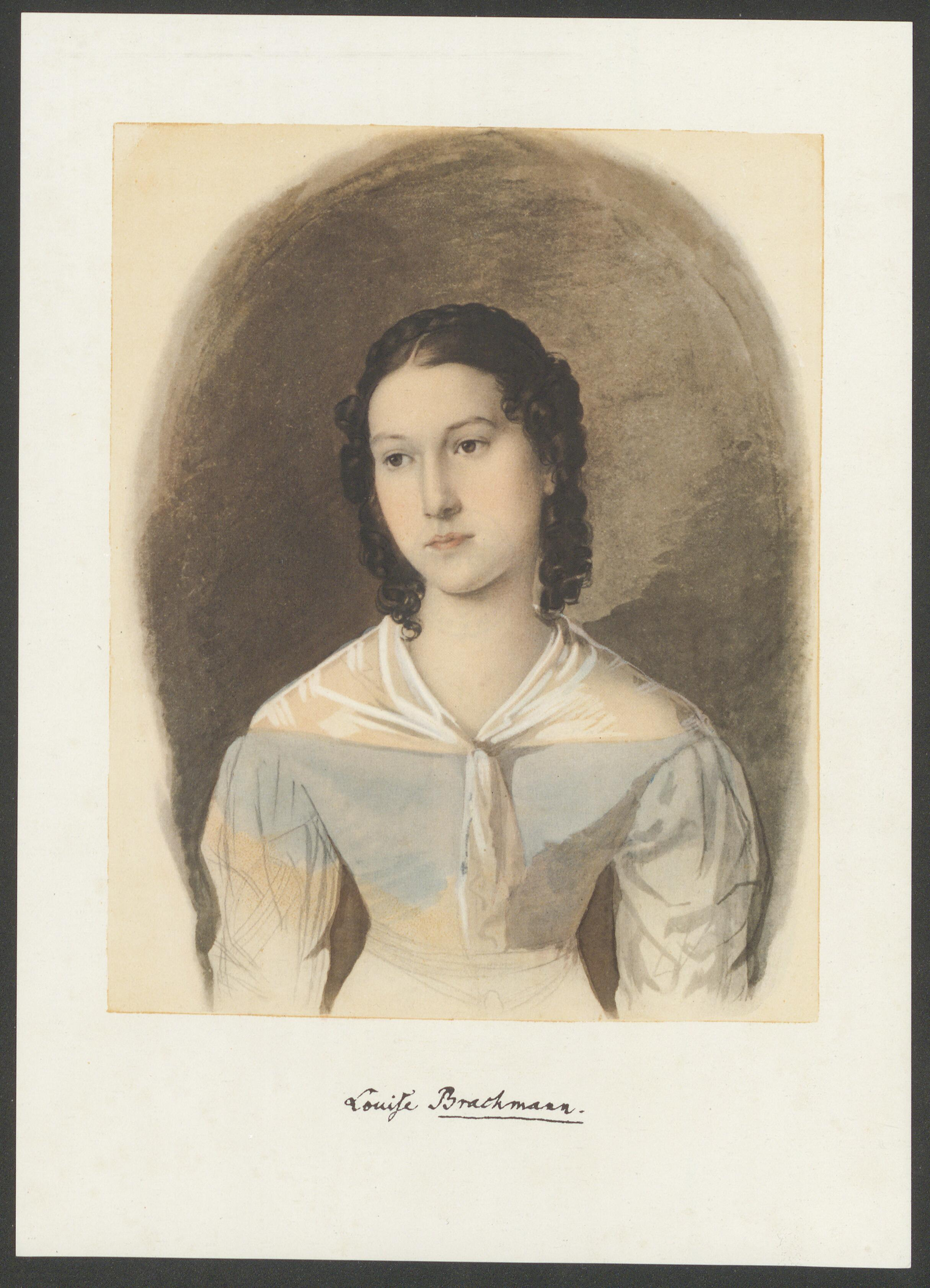
- Louise Brachmann, after a painting by Leopold Kupelwieser
- Born: Karoline Louise Brachmann; 2 February 1777; Rochlitz, Saxony
- Died: 17 September 1822 (aged 45); Halle, Kingdom of Prussia
- Occupations: Poet; Short story writer; Novelist

Karoline Louise Brachmann (2 February 1777 — 17 September 1822) was a German poet, short story writer, and novelist.

== Biography ==
Louise Brachmann was born in Rochlitz, Saxony, to a civil service father and a cultured mother. Responsible for her education, Louise's mother was close to the Hardenberg family, which included the celebrated poet Novalis. Louise's mother introduced her to Novalis, who, recognizing Brachmann's talent and potential, recommended her to Friedrich von Schiller. Brachmann contributed to Schiller's journals the Die Horen and Musenalmanach. In 1800, four years after her first suicide attempt, her parents, sister, and three close friends died. She met Sophie Mereau in Jena, where she published poems and short stories in modern journals. However, she failed to find a publisher to sponsor her work in her lifetime. Brachmann's second suicide attempt was thwarted and, a few days later, she drowned herself in the river Saale in Halle, Germany.

== Published works ==
Louise Brachmann's published works as cited by An Encyclopedia of Continental Women Writers.

- Lyrische Gedichte, 1800
- Gedichte, 1808
- "Einige Züge aus meinem Leben in Beziehung auf Novalis"
- Romantische Blüten, 1817
- Das Fottesurteil. Rittergedicht in fünf Gesängen, 1818
- Novellen und kleine Romane, 1819
- Schilderungen aus der Wirklichkeit, 1820
- Novellen, 1822
- Romantische Blätter, 1823
- Verirrungen oder Die Macht der Verhältnisse, novel, 1823
- Auserlesene Dichtungen von L.B., F.K.J. Schütz, ed., 2 volumes, 1824
- Erzählungen und Novellen, F.K.J. Schütz, ed., 4 volumes, 1825
- Auserlesene Erzählungen und Novellen, K.L.M. Müller, ed., 4 volumes, 1825–1826

Translation:

- The Three Sons [Die drei Söhne], 1827
