= Study of the Hebrew language =

Study of the Hebrew language has an ancient history. Since Hebrew is the original language of the Hebrew Bible (known as the Torah and Tanakh), it is therefore a language that has always been central to Judaism and valued by the Jewish people for over three thousand years and later by Christian scholars as well.

== Jewish scholars of Hebrew ==
The study of Hebrew occurred already in some grammatical notes in the Talmud and Midrash. The Masoretes continued the study as they fixed the text and vocalization of the Hebrew Bible. Under the influence of Arab grammarians, Rabbi Saadia Gaon (tenth century) made the Jewish study of Hebrew grammar almost scientific. Later Jewish grammarians include David Qimhi (known as the Radak), Abraham ibn Ezra and Judah ben David Hayyuj.

Eliezer Ben-Yehuda is the main revivalist of Hebrew as a modern spoken language, although in his book Language in Time of Revolution, Israeli scholar Benjamin Harshav diminishes Ben-Yehuda's role and attributes the success of the revival to a wider movement in the Jewish society.

== Non-Jewish scholars of Hebrew ==
The first major non-Jewish grammarian was John Reuchlin (16th century), but it was not until the early 19th century that Hebrew linguistics was studied in a secular, scientific way. The pioneer of this movement was Wilhelm Gesenius, who published thirteen editions of his Hebräische Grammatik. After Gesenius' death in 1842, the 14th through 21st editions were published by E. Rödiger, and the 22nd through 28th editions by Emil Kautzsch. Many of these editions were translated into English. The 28th edition was published in 1910 by A. E. Cowley and is known today simply as Gesenius' Hebrew Grammar. It became the standard Hebrew reference grammar, and although it is somewhat outdated by newer works, it is still widely used in the field in the 21st century.

The largest compendium of Hebrew grammatical material is König's Historisch-Kritisches Lehrgebäude der Hebräischen Sprache (1881-97).

Paul Joüon's Grammaire de l'hébreu biblique (1923) was recently edited and translated into English by Takamitsu Muraoka as A Grammar of Biblical Hebrew (1991; revised edition 2006). Muraoka made this into the most complete and up-to-date reference grammar. Also modern is Rudolf Meyer's Hebräische Grammatik (1966-72), but it is not quite as thorough as Joüon-Muraoka. Of note as well is Mayer Lambert's Traité de grammaire hébraïque (1931).

The most thorough, well-organized, and analytically incisive Hebrew grammar is the 29th edition of Gesenius' grammar by Gotthelf Bergsträsser. However, the author only managed to complete the sections on Phonology (1918) and the Verb (1929) before his untimely death. Although other grammars are more current, Bergsträsser's is unsurpassed due to its depth and insight. Another excellent grammar is Hans Bauer and Pontus Leander's Historische Grammatik der Hebräischen Sprache des Alten Testaments (1917-22) although it, too, lacks syntax. Neither grammar has been translated into English, although Bergsträsser's has been translated into Hebrew (Jerusalem, 1972).

== Israeli scholars of Hebrew ==
Modern Israeli scholars in the field of Hebrew linguistics include Naftali Herz Tur-Sinai, Chaim Menachem Rabin, E. Y. Kutscher, Shelomo Morag, Joshua Blau, Ze'ev Ben-Haim, Haiim B. Rosén, Ghil'ad Zuckermann, Elisha Qimron and Moshe Bar-Asher.

== The Academy of the Hebrew Language ==
The Academy of the Hebrew Language (האקדמיה ללשון העברית) in modern Israel is the "Supreme Foundation for the Science of the Hebrew Language", founded by the Israeli Government in 1953. It is responsible for coining neologisms to keep up with today's rapidly changing society. It also has the "final say" concerning matters of spelling and grammar.

== See also ==
- Hebraist
- Jewish studies
- List of Hebrew language authors
- List of Hebrew language playwrights
- List of Hebrew language poets
