= Heinrich Gottlob Lang =

German entomologist

Heinrich Gottlob Lang (1739, Dresden - 1809, Augsburg ) was a German entomologist who specialised in Lepidoptera. He was an artist illustrating books on natural history, naturalist and natural history collector, notably of minerals. He wrote Verzeichniss seiner Schmetterlinge, in den Gegenden um Augsburg gesammelt und nach dem Wiener systematischen Verzeichniss eingetheilt : mit den Linneischen, auch deutschen und französischen Namen, und Anführung derjenigen Werke, worinn sie mit Farben abgebildet sind Zweyte, verbesserte und stark vermehrte Auflage. - pp. I-XXVIII [= 1-28], 1–226, [1]. Augsburg. (Klett).pdf published by Maria Jakobina Klett (1709-1795) in which he describes Melitaea diamina. Maria Jakobina Klett was owner of Eberhard Klett Verlag, one of the most important Augsburg “Protestant publishers.” She published many technical books

He was also a heraldic, and seal-engraver
