= Martin Engelbrecht =

Baroque engraver, printer, and publisher from the Holy Roman Empire

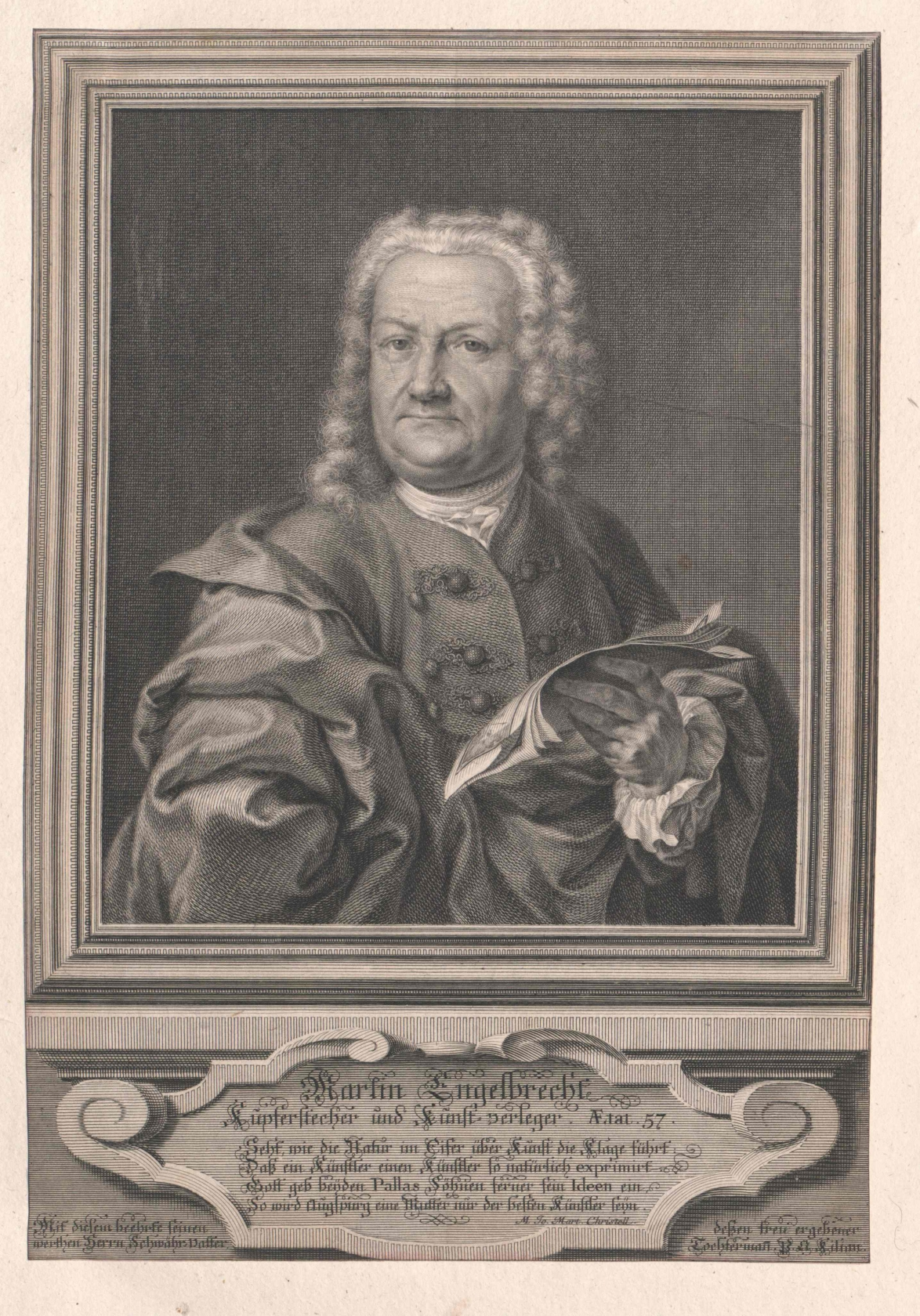
Engraving of Martin Engelbrecht c. 1740

Martin Engelbrecht (16 September 1684, Augsburg - 18 January 1756, Augsburg) was a prominent Baroque engraver, printer, and publisher from the Holy Roman Empire. He is best known for his development of perspective theaters, also known as paper theaters or dioramas, which revolutionized the visual entertainment of his time. These works are celebrated for their intricate designs and innovative use of depth, making them highly collectible and sought after by historians and enthusiasts today.

== Early life and career ==
Born in Augsburg, Germany, Martin Engelbrecht was trained as a copper engraver under Gabriel Eigner. He began his career working alongside his older brother, Christian Engelbrecht, an established engraver. During his early years, Engelbrecht focused on producing portraits of monarchs and detailed landscapes. His time in Vienna was particularly influential, as he worked on imperial ceremonies and refined his engraving techniques. These early works, celebrated for their precision and grandeur, laid the foundation for his later innovations in visual entertainment.

== Perspective theaters and dioramas ==
In 1730, Engelbrecht began producing perspective theaters, which are often referred to as paper theaters or dioramas. These theaters were made up of intricate, hand-colored engravings, typically arranged in layered sets to create a three-dimensional scene when viewed through an optical device. Engelbrecht's perspective theaters depicted a wide range of subjects, from court life and battle scenes to religious and allegorical themes.

These paper theaters were designed to be viewed through a special box fitted with lenses, giving the illusion of depth and realism. Engelbrecht’s ability to manipulate perspective and create immersive visual experiences was groundbreaking for the time. His dioramas not only entertained but also provided educational value, as they often illustrated historical and religious events.
