= Jacques Torczyner =

American Jewish activist (1914–2013)

Jacques Torczyner (July 8, 1914–March 7, 2013) was a leader in the American and international Zionist movement. He was born in Antwerp, Belgium, in 1914 and emigrated to the United States in 1940, escaping Belgium after the Nazi invasion. He became a member of the Zionist Organization of America (ZOA). He joined 18 Jewish leaders at a special meeting in July 1945 called by David Ben-Gurion organizing the Friends of the Haganah to organize support for the Jewish defense forces in Palestine.

He was active in the campaign for the creation of the Jewish State led by Abba Hillel Silver and took on additional responsibility when Silver became the president of ZOA. After the founding of the State of Israel, he was a member of the Rifkind Committee and various special committees of the Jewish Agency charged with evaluating the future of the Zionist movement. Torczyner was President of the ZOA for five consecutive terms.

Torczyner lectured around the world and wrote articles on issues faced by the State of Israel and World Jewry. He was the nephew of Naftali Herz Tur-Sinai. His papers are archived at the Menachem Begin Heritage Center in Jerusalem.

Torczyner died on March 7, 2013.
