= Naftali Herz Tur-Sinai =

Israeli Bible scholar and linguist

- נפתלי הרץ טור-סיני
- Born: 13 November 1886; Lemberg, Galicia, Austria-Hungary
- Died: 17 October 1973 (aged 86); Jerusalem
- Occupations: Bible scholar, linguist, author
- Known for: Revival of the Hebrew language
- Awards: Bialik Prize (1940); Israel Prize (1956); Yakir Yerushalayim (1967)

Academic work
- Discipline: Linguistics, Semitic languages
- Institutions: Hebrew University of Jerusalem
- Notable works: The Revival of the Hebrew Language, The Book of Job: A New Commentary

Naftali Herz Tur-Sinai (Hebrew: נפתלי הרץ טור-סיני; born 13 November 1886 – 17 October 1973) was a Bible scholar, author, and linguist instrumental in the revival of the Hebrew language as a modern, spoken language. Tur-Sinai was the first president of the Academy of the Hebrew Language and founder of its Historical Dictionary Project.

== Biography ==
Naftali Herz Tur-Sinai was born Harry Torczyner in Lemberg, Kingdom of Galicia, Austria-Hungary (later Lwów, Poland and now Lviv, Ukraine) in 1886. He moved to Vienna, Austria, and then to Berlin, Weimar Republic of Germany in 1919 to be a lecturer at the Hochschule für die Wissenschaft des Judentums (College for Jewish Studies) in Berlin.

He was in Ottoman Palestine from 1910–1912 and participated in founding Rehavia Gymnasium in Jerusalem and Herzliya Hebrew Gymnasium in Tel Aviv in the Mutasarrifate of Jerusalem. He settled in Mandatory Palestine in 1933. He was professor of Semitic languages at the Hebrew University of Jerusalem and a member of the Israel Academy of Sciences and Humanities.

He and Eliezer Ben-Yehuda are considered Israel’s two foremost philologists. Tur-Sinai's nephew, Jacques Torczyner, is a former president of the Zionist Organization of America.

== Awards ==
- In 1940, Tur-Sinai was awarded the Bialik Prize for Jewish thought.
- In 1956, he was awarded the Israel Prize, for Jewish studies.
- In 1967, he received the Yakir Yerushalayim (Worthy Citizen of Jerusalem) award, the year of the award's inauguration.

== Published works ==
Of his many books, those translated into English include The Revival of the Hebrew Language and The Book of Job: A New Commentary. He published a translation of the Tanakh from Hebrew into German. Of the Hebrew dictionary project begun by Eliezer Ben-Yehuda (Dictionary of the Ancient and Modern Hebrew Language, Ben-Yehuda Dictionary), volumes 10-16 as well as the prolegomenon volume (המבוא הגדול) "were edited, updated, and completed" by Tur-Sinai, with the assistance of Dov Jarden, Meir Medan, and others. The sixteenth and final volume was released in 1958, 50 years after Ben Yehuda's first volume was published.

== See also ==
- List of Israel Prize recipients
- List of Bialik Prize recipients
