= University of Altdorf =

- Universität Altdorf
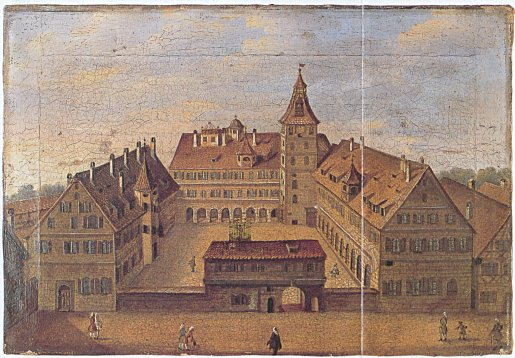
- The University of Altdorf in 1714
- Active: 1578–1809
- Location: Altdorf bei Nürnberg

The University of Altdorf (German: Universität Altdorf) was a university in Altdorf bei Nürnberg, a small town outside the Free Imperial City of Nuremberg. It was founded in 1578 and received university privileges in 1622 and was closed in 1809 by Maximilian I Joseph of Bavaria.

== History ==
In the period 1614–1618, Altdorf was briefly the centre of Socinianism in Germany. Encouraged by the connections of German Antitrinitarians to the Racovian Academy in Poland, German and Polish Socinians attempted to establish in Altdorf a similar Academy. Among the notable Socinian students was the 26-year-old Samuel Przypkowski. He was admitted as student on March 22, 1614, three weeks after Thomas Seget, but was expelled from Altdorf in 1616 "Crypto-Socinianism" was widely suspected among the student body. In January 1617 the syndicus Jacob Weigel brought two students Joachim Peuschel and Johann Vogel back to Altdorf and the college made them give a public recantation. This recantation was answered by Valentin Schmalz, one of the German professors of the Academy in Poland.

Notable instructors include Hugues Doneau, Scipione Gentili, and Daniel Schwenter.

Notable students include later imperial field marshals Albrecht von Wallenstein (1583–1634) and Gottfried Heinrich zu Pappenheim (1594–1632); Generalfeldwachtmeister Hans Ulrich von Schaffgotsch (1595–1635); the polymath Johann Schreck (1576–1630); the composers Wolfgang Carl Briegel (1626–1712) and Johann Pachelbel (1653–1706); and the theologian David Caspari (1648–1702).

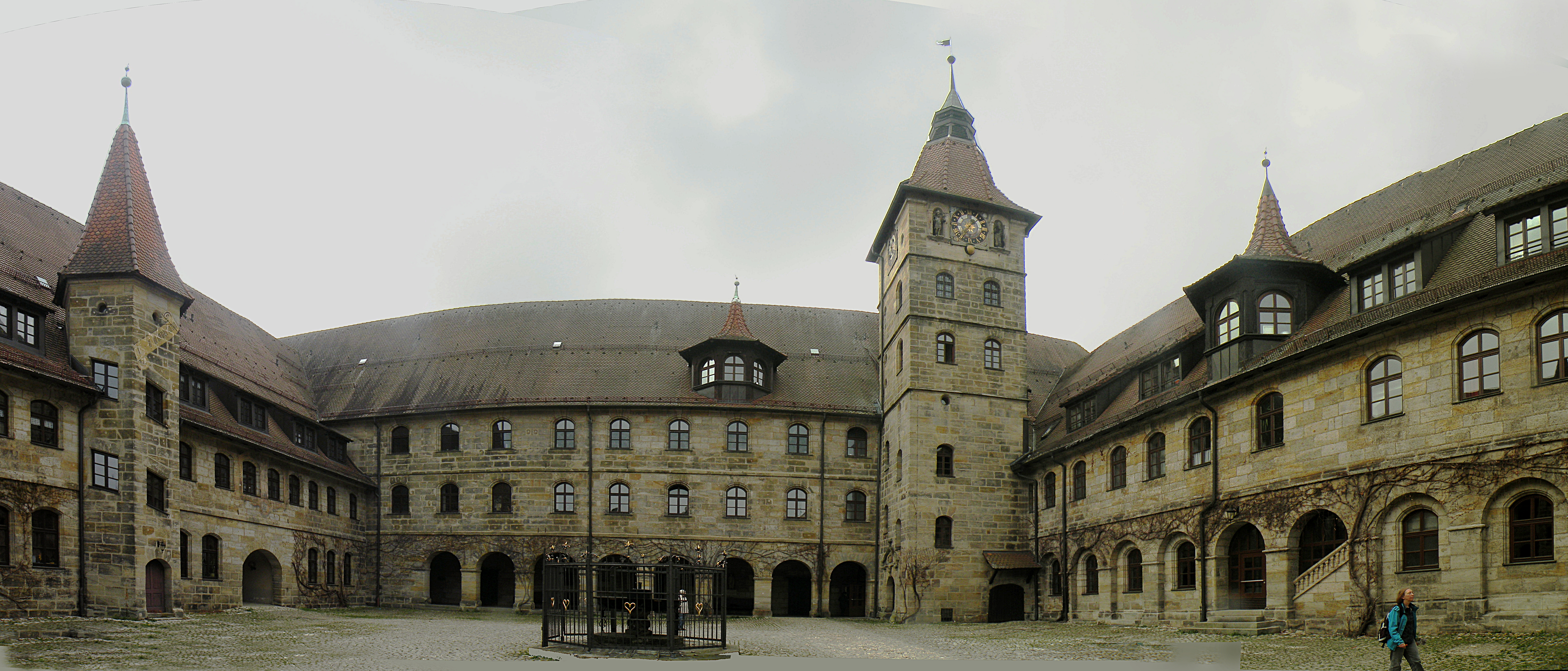
The University building in the year of 2014 (Altenheim)

The polymath Gottfried Wilhelm Leibniz (1646–1716), most famous for co-discovering calculus, received his Dr. jur. from the University of Altdorf in 1666 after the University of Leipzig refused to grant him the degree, likely on account of his relative youth.

== See also ==
- List of early modern universities in Europe
