= Altdorf =

Altdorf (German pronunciation: [ˈaltˌdɔʁf]), a compound word in German consisting of old and village, may refer to:

== France ==
- Altdorf, Bas-Rhin

== Germany ==
- Altdorf bei Nürnberg, a city in Bavaria
- Altdorf, Lower Bavaria, a municipality in Landshut, Bavaria
- Altdorf, Böblingen
- Altdorf, Esslingen
- Altdorf, Rhineland-Palatinate, a municipality in Südliche Weinstraße
- Weingarten (Württemberg), formerly Altdorf

== Switzerland ==
- Altdorf, Jura or Bassecourt
- Altdorf, Schaffhausen
- Altdorf, Uri

== Poland (German name) ==
- Stara Wieś, Pszczyna
- Stara Wieś, Silesian Voivodeship

== United States ==
- Altdorf, Wisconsin

== Other uses ==
- Altdorf (Warhammer), the capital of the Empire (a polity analogous to the Holy Roman Empire) in the universe of Warhammer Fantasy
- University of Altdorf, a former university in Altdorf bei Nürnberg, Germany

== See also ==
- Altendorf (disambiguation)
- Altorf, a commune in Grand-Est, France
