= Altendorf =

Altendorf may refer to:

== Places ==
- Altendorf, Austria, a town in the district of Neunkirchen in Lower Austria
- Germany:
  - Altendorf, Essen, a borough of the city of Essen, North Rhine-Westphalia
  - Altendorf, Upper Franconia, a town in the district of Bamberg, Bavaria
  - Altendorf, Upper Palatinate, a town in the district of Schwandorf, Bavaria
  - Altendorf (Sebnitz), a village in Sebnitz municipality, Saxony
  - Altendorf (megalithic tomb), an archaeological site near Naumburg, Hesse
  - Altendorf, a village in the municipality of Brome, Germany
- Altendorf, Schwyz, a municipality in Switzerland
  - Altendorf railway station
- Spišská Stará Ves in Slovakia

== People ==
- Pam Altendorf, a politician in Minnesota, United States

== Other ==
- Altendorf GmbH, a woodworking machinery manufacturer from Minden, North Rhine-Westphalia, Germany

== See also ==
- Altdorf (disambiguation)
