= Konrad Mannert =

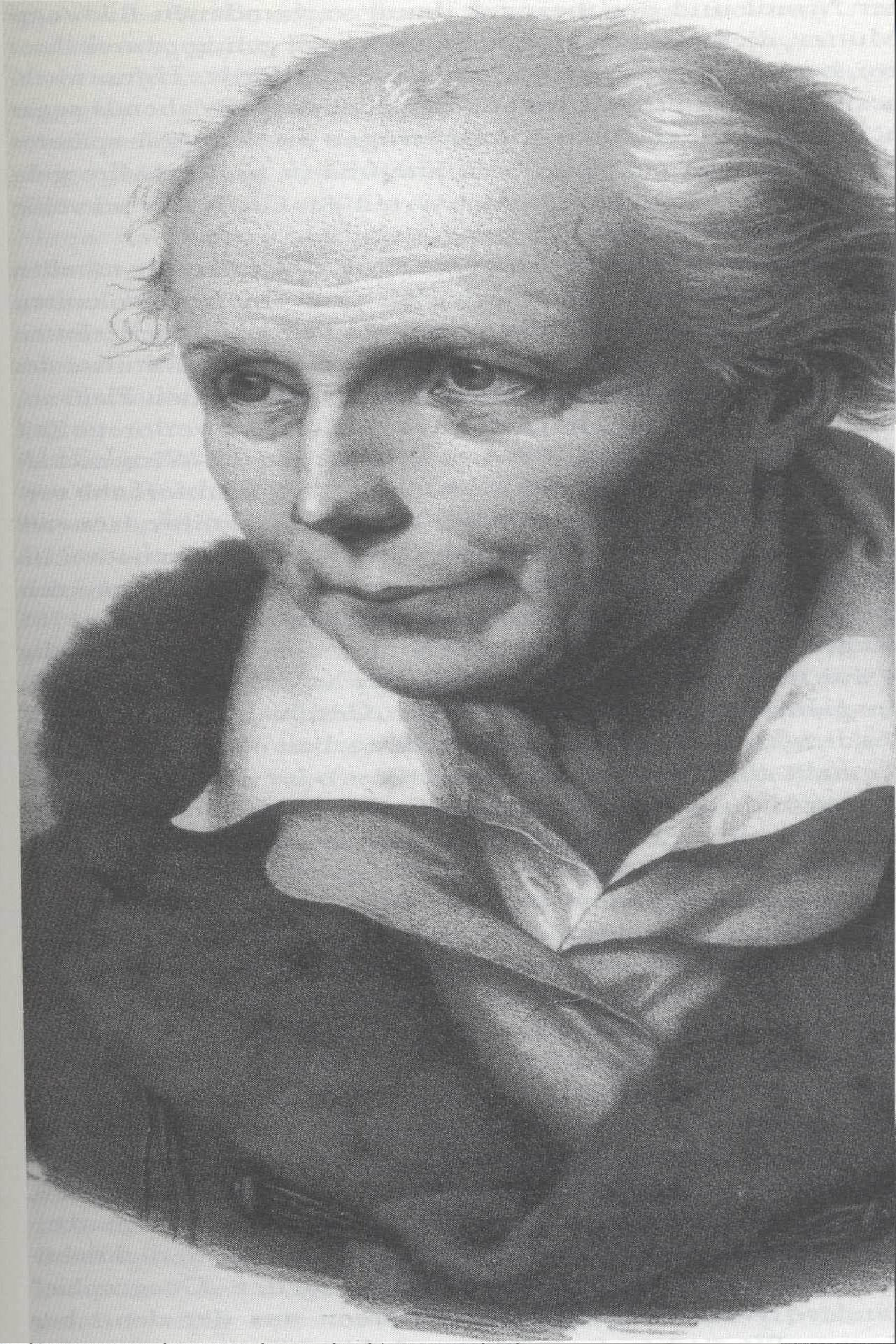
Konrad Mannert.

Konrad Mannert (April 17, 1756 – September 27, 1834) was a Prussian historian and geographer.

Mannert was born in Altdorf bei Nürnberg, where he did his studies. In 1784, he became a teacher at the Sebaldusschule in Nuremberg, and in 1788 at the Ägidiusgymnasium there. In 1796, he became professor of history at the University of Altdorf, in 1805 at the University of Würzburg, in 1807 at the Ludwig-Maximilians-Universität (then in Landshut), and from 1826 at the same university in its new location in Munich. He died in Munich in 1834. His historical work was known in particular for its focus on studying primary sources.

== Works ==
- Kompendium der deutschen Reichsgeschichte, Nuremberg, 1803 – Compendium of German Reich history.
- Älteste Geschichte Bojariens, Sulzbach, 1807 – Oldest Bojarian history.
- Kaiser Ludwig IV., Landshut, 1812 – Emperor Louis IV
- Geographie der Griechen und Römer, Nuremberg, 1795–1825, 10 volumes – Geography of the Greeks and Romans.
- Tabula Peutingeriana, Munich, 1824 – Tabula Peutingeriana.
- Geschichte Bayerns, Leipzig, 1826, 2 volumes – Bavarian history.
- Geschichte der alten Deutschen, besonders der Franken, Stuttgart, 1829–1832, 2 volumes – History of the ancient Germans, especially the Franks.
