= Stephan Farffler =

German inventor

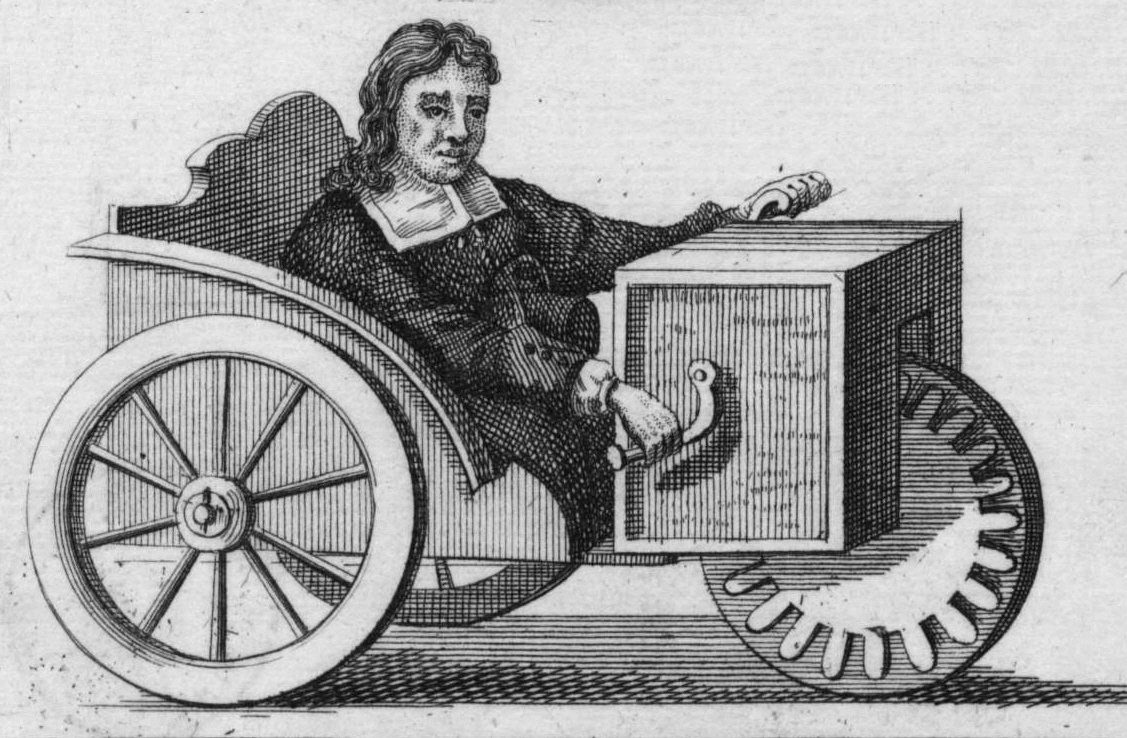
- Farffler in his hand-driven carriage
- Born: November 12, 1633; Altdorf bei Nürnberg, Holy Roman Empire
- Died: October 24, 1689 (aged 55); Nürnberg or Altdorf bei Nürnberg
- Occupations: Watchmaker, inventor

Stephan Farffler (1633 – October 24, 1689), sometimes spelled Stephan Farfler, was a German watchmaker of the seventeenth century whose invention of a manumotive carriage in 1655 is widely considered to have been the first self-propelled wheelchair. The three-wheeled device is also believed to have been a precursor to the modern-day tricycle and bicycle.

Farffler, who was either a paraplegic or an amputee, also created a device for turning an hourglass at regular intervals and added chimes to the clocktower of Altdorf bei Nürnberg.

According to the German astronomer Johann Gabriel Doppelmayr, Farffler suffered an accident at the age of three that paralyzed him from the hips down. Others described him as having "crippled" legs.

== See also ==
- List of motorized trikes
