= Johannes Praetorius (mathematician) =

German astronomer and mathematician

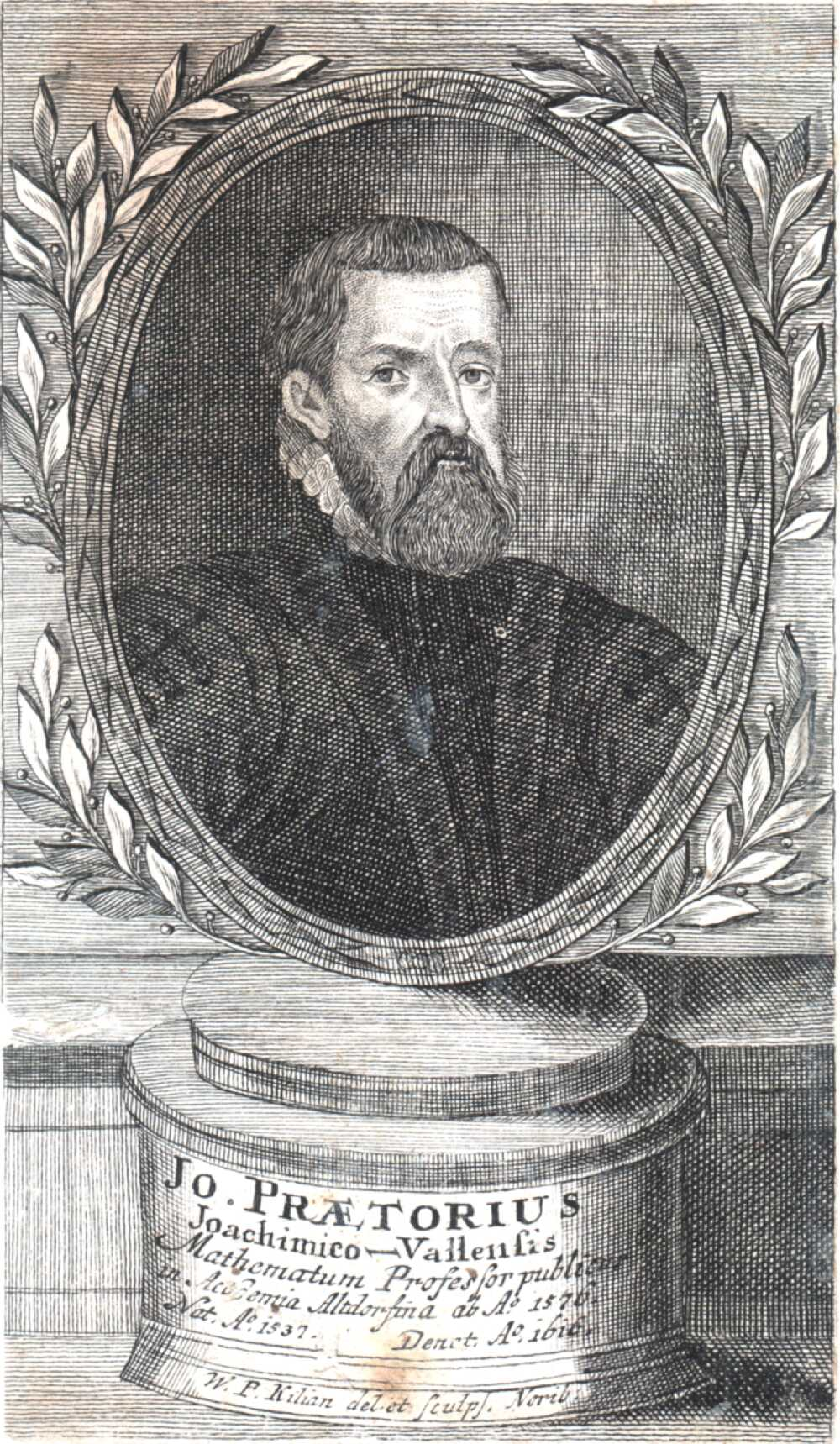
Johannes Praetorius

Johannes Praetorius or Johann Richter (1537 – 27 October 1616) was a German mathematician and astronomer.

== Life ==
Astronomia, ars liberalis

Praetorius was born in Jáchymov, Bohemia. From 1557 he studied at the University of Wittenberg, and from 1562 to 1569 he lived in Nuremberg. His astronomical and mathematical instruments are kept at Germanisches Nationalmuseum in Nuremberg.

In 1571 he became Professor of mathematics (astronomy) at Wittenberg where he met Valentinus Otho and Joachim Rheticus. He died in Altdorf bei Nürnberg, aged about 79.

He taught Copernicus' theory of astronomy initially as a means of eliminating the equant from Ptolemy's account, and later moving to a proto-Tychonic system.

== Works ==
- De cometis, qui antea visi sunt, et de eo qui novissime mense Novembri apparuit, narratio 1578
- Problema, quod iubet ex quatuor rectis lineis datis quadrilaterum fieri, quod sit in circulo 1598

== Sources ==
- "Entry". Zedlers Universallexikon. Vol. 29. p. 86.
- Gerhard Bott (Hrsg.): Focus Behaim Globus. 2 Bde. Nürnberg: Verlag des Germanischen Nationalmuseums 1992
- Johann Gabriel Doppelmayr: Historische Nachricht von den Nürnbergischen Mathematicis und Künstlern. Nürnberg: Peter Conrad Monath 1730, S. 83-92
- Siegmund Günther (1888). "Praetorius, Johannes" . Allgemeine Deutsche Biographie (in German). Vol. 26. Leipzig: Duncker & Humblot. pp. 519–520.
- Felix Schmeidler (2001). "Praetorius, Johannes". Neue Deutsche Biographie (in German). Vol. 20. Berlin: Duncker & Humblot. p. 667.
- Klaus Matthäus: Zur Geschichte des Nürnberger Kalenderwesens. Frankfurt a.M.: Buchhändler-Vereinigung 1969, Sp. 1044-1047
- Uwe Müller (Hrsg.): 450 Jahre Copernicus „De revolutionibus“. Astronomische und mathematische Bücher aus Schweinfurter Bibliotheken. Schweinfurt: Stadtarchiv 1993
- Zofia Wardeska: Die Universität Altdorf als Zentrum der Copernicus-Rezeption um die Wende vom 16. zum 17. Jahrhundert. Sudhoffs Archiv 61/2, 1977, S. 156-164
- Georg Andreas Will: Nürnbergisches Gelehrtenlexikon Bd. 3. Nürnberg: Lorenz Schüpfel 1757, S. 225-231
- Helmar Junghans: Verzeichnis der Rektoren, Prorektoren, Dekane, Professoren und Schloßkirchenprediger der Leucorea vom Sommersemester 1536 bis zum Wintersemester 1574/75. In Irene Dingel, Günther Wartenberg: Georg Major (1502-1574) - Ein Theologe der Wittenberger Reformation. Evangelische Verlagsanstalt, Leipzig, 2005, ISBN 3-374-02332-0
