= Abdias Treu =

German mathematician and astronomer

Abdias Treu (sometimes spelled Trew) (29 July 1597 – 12 April 1669) was a German mathematician, music theorist, vicar, and academic.

== Biography ==
The son of a cantor and deputy headmaster, Abdias Treu was born in Ansbach on 29 July 1597. From 1611 to 1618 he attended grammar school at Heilbronn. After this he studied mathematics, philosophy, and theology at University of Wittenberg. He attended that institution on a scholarship given to him by the Margave of Brandenburg, and was awarded a master's degree after defending his thesis, De vero et falso, in March 1621. After graduating he worked as a vicar or deacon in first Heidenheim, Bavaria and then Markt Erlbach. In 1625 he assumed the post of chancellor of the Lateinschule at Ansbach (founded by George, Margrave of Brandenburg-Ansbach).

Treu was the professor of mathematics and physical science at the University of Altdorf from 1636-1669. He is best known for his contributions to the field of astronomy. He also contributed writings on the mathematical nature of music theory. His musical treatise Janitor Lycaei musici was published in Rothenburg ob der Tauber in 1635, and was concerned with devising an accurate musical temperament in relation to the monochord. Two of his mathematics publications, Manuale geometriae practicae (Nuremberg, 1636) and Directorium mathematicum (Altdorf, 1657) also contain some discussion of music. He is the grandfather of physician and botanist Christoph Jacob Treu.

Treu died in Altdorf bei Nürnberg on 12 April 1669.
