= Tricycle =

Three-wheeled self-powered vehicle

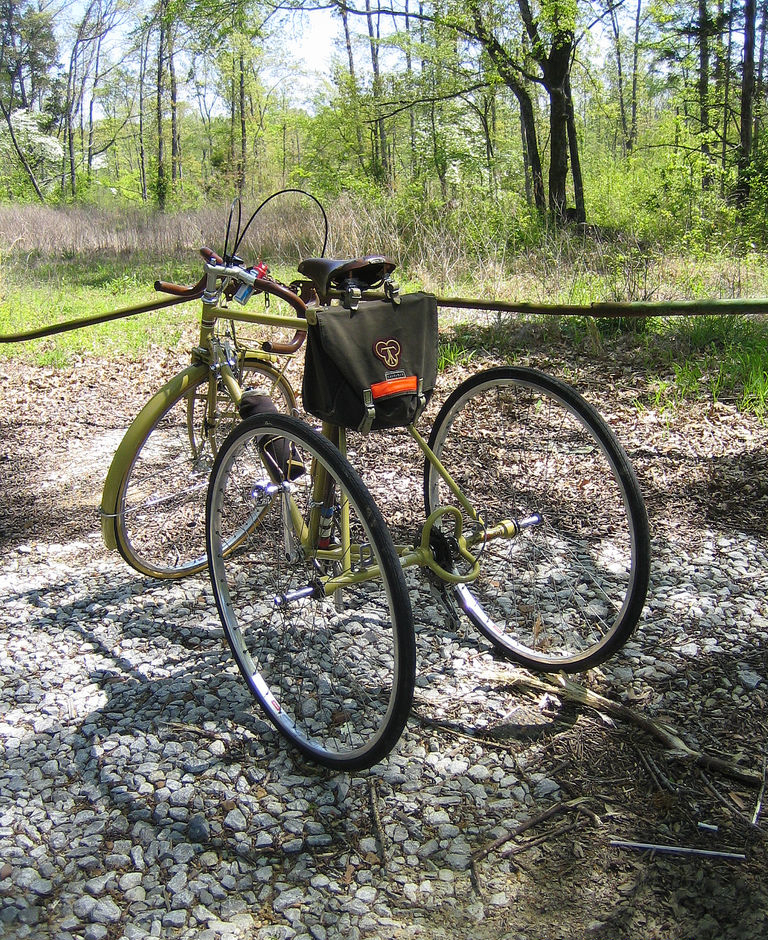
- Modern upright tricycle
- Classification: Vehicle
- Application: Transportation
- Fuel source: Human-power
- Wheels: 3
- Components: Frame, Wheels, Tires, Saddle, Handlebar, Pedals, Drivetrain
- Inventor: Stephan Farffler
- Invented: 1655 or 1680
- Configurations: Delta, Tadpole
- Types: Upright, Recumbent, Hand-crank, Tandem, Rickshaw, Freight, Children's, Drift, Hand and Foot, Tilting

A tricycle, often abbreviated to trike, is a human-powered (or gasoline or electric motor-powered or assisted, or gravity-powered) three-wheeled vehicle.

Some tricycles, such as cycle rickshaws (for passenger transport) and freight trikes, are used for commercial purposes, especially in the developing world, particularly Africa and Asia.

In the West, adult-sized tricycles are used primarily for recreation, shopping, and exercise. Tricycles are favoured by children, disabled people, and senior adults for their apparent stability versus a bicycle; however a conventional trike may exhibit poor stability when turning, and the rider should exercise appropriate caution when cornering (e.g., with regard to speed, rate of turn, slope of surface) and technique (e.g., leaning the body 'into' the turn) to avoid tipping the trike over. Designs such as recumbents or others which place the rider lower relative to the wheel axles have a lower centre of gravity, and designs with canted wheels (tilted at the top towards the centerline) may be more resistant to lifting inner wheels or tipping during fast sharp turns, but still require operator awareness and technique.

== History ==
A three-wheeled wheelchair was built in 1655 or 1680 by a disabled German man, Stephan Farffler, who wanted to be able to maintain his mobility. A watch-maker, Farffler created a vehicle that was powered by hand cranks.

In 1789, two French inventors developed a three-wheeled vehicle, powered by pedals; they called it the tricycle. In 1818, British inventor Denis Johnson patented his approach to designing tricycles. In 1874–76, James Starley developed the Coventry Lever Tricycle so that women could ride a cycle. There was a central seat with treadles which drove a large wheel on the left through levers and two small wheels on the right side which steered. In 1877, Starley developed a new vehicle he called the Coventry Rotary, which was "one of the first rotary chain drive tricycles." Starley's inventions started a tricycling craze in Britain; by 1879, there were "twenty types of tricycles and multi-wheel cycles ... produced in Coventry, England, and by 1884, there were over 120 different models produced by 20 manufacturers." The first front steering tricycle was manufactured in 1881 by The Leicester Safety Tricycle Company of Leicester, England, which was brought to the market in 1882 costing £18 (equivalent to £1,872 in 2025). They also developed a folding tricycle at the same time.

Tricycles were used by riders who did not feel comfortable on the high wheelers, such as women who wore long, flowing dresses (see rational dress).

In September, 1903 Edmund Payne, the popular comedian, started an attempt to beat the twenty-four hours' unpaced Tricycle record. At 100 miles Payne was inside his schedule time, but shortly afterwards had to desist at Wisbech, having encountered five hours of incessant rain.

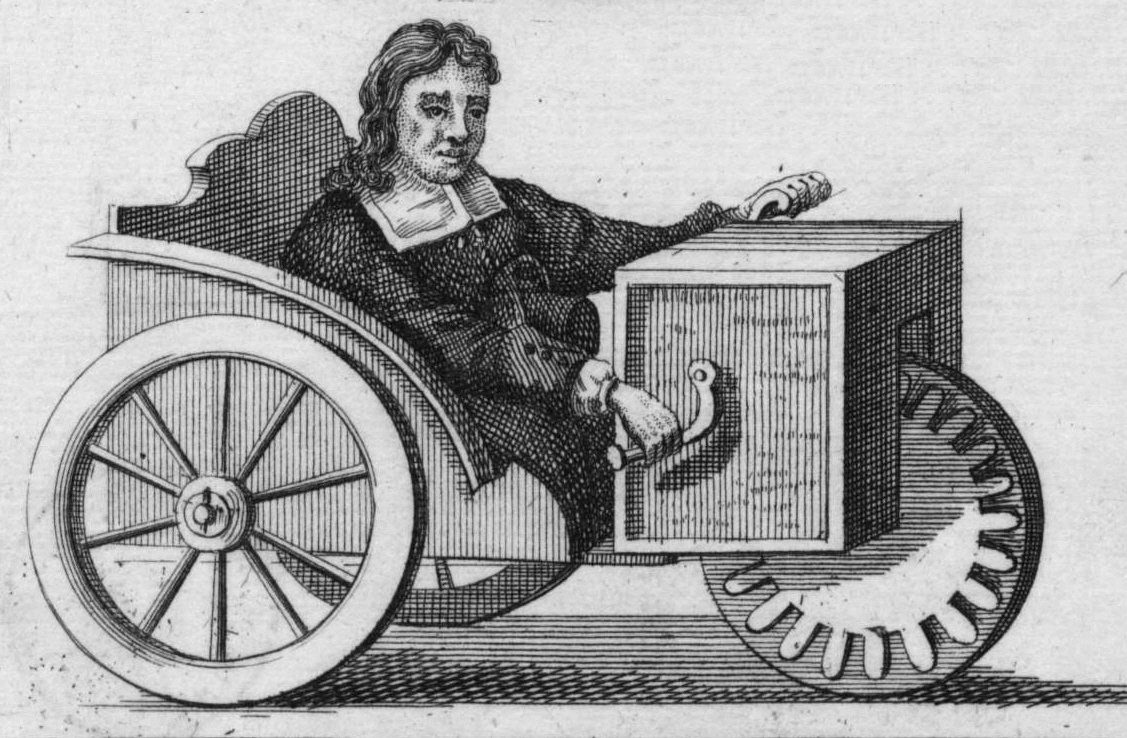
Stephan Farffler's hand-controlled three-wheeled wheelchair

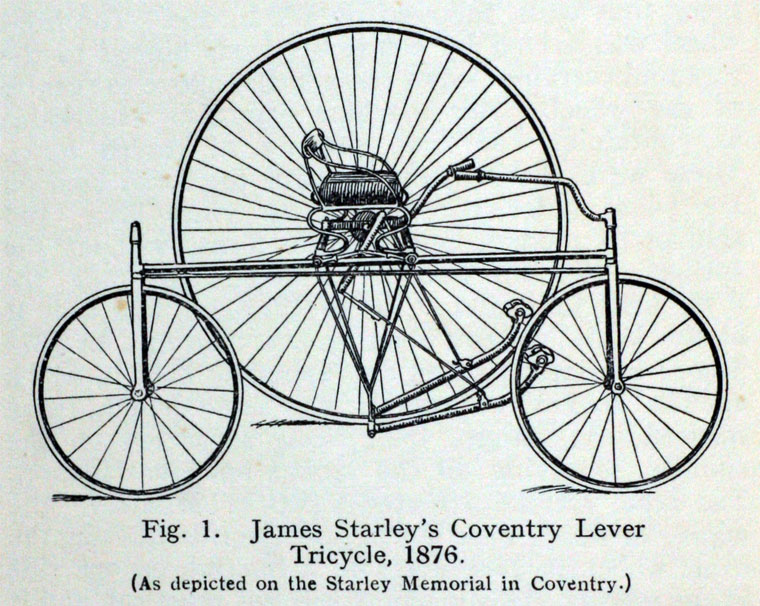
Starley Coventry Lever Tricycle 1876

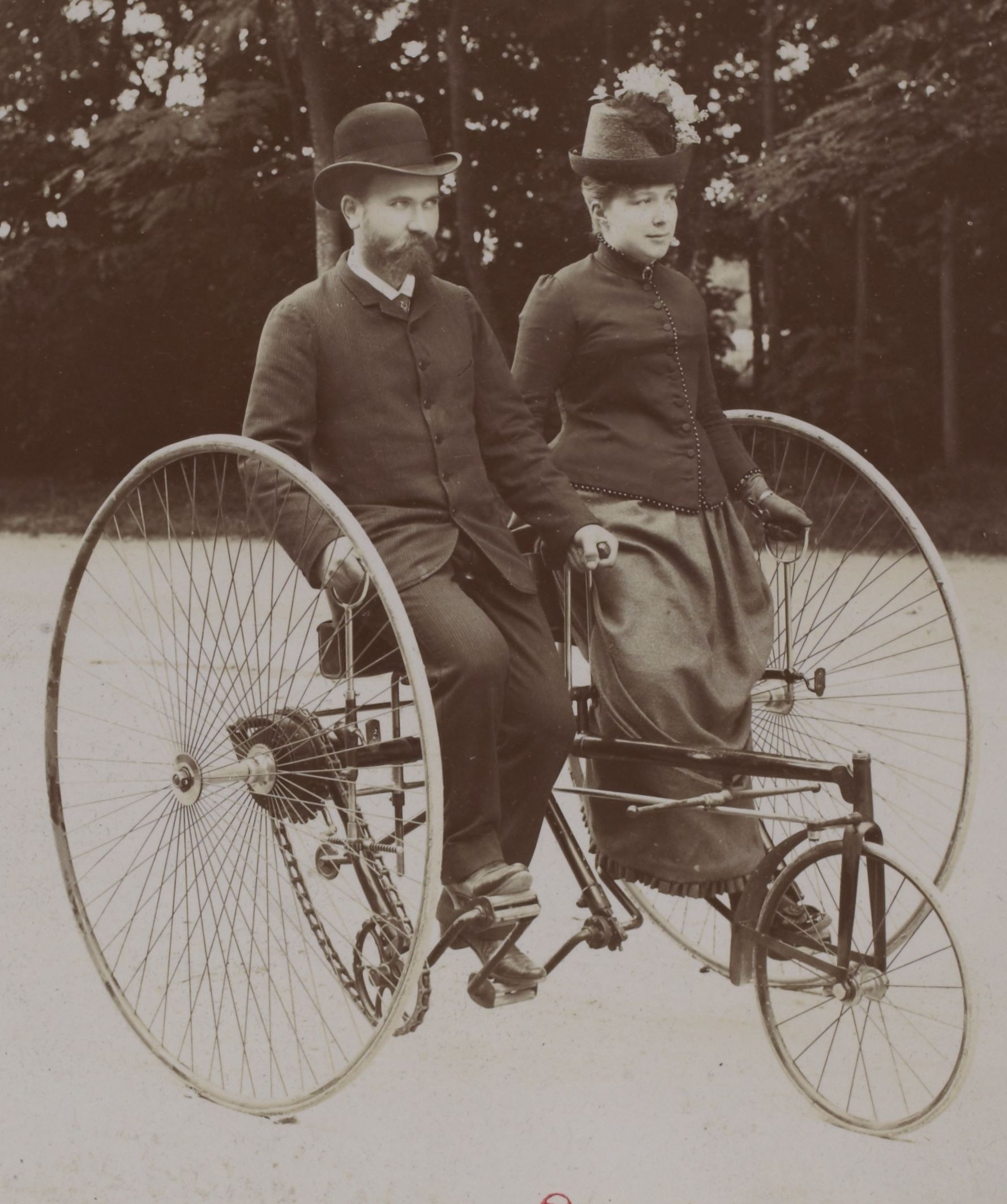
Adolphe Clément and his wife riding a sociable tricycle, c.1895

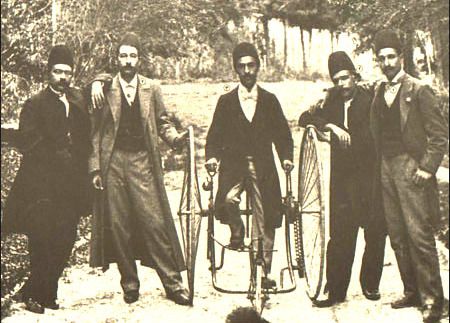
19th-century tricycle used in Iran

== Associations ==
In the UK, upright tricycles are sometimes referred to as "barrows". Many trike enthusiasts in the UK belong to the Tricycle Association, formed in 1929. They participate in day rides, tours, time trials, and a criterium (massed start racing) series.

== Wheel configurations ==
=== Delta ===
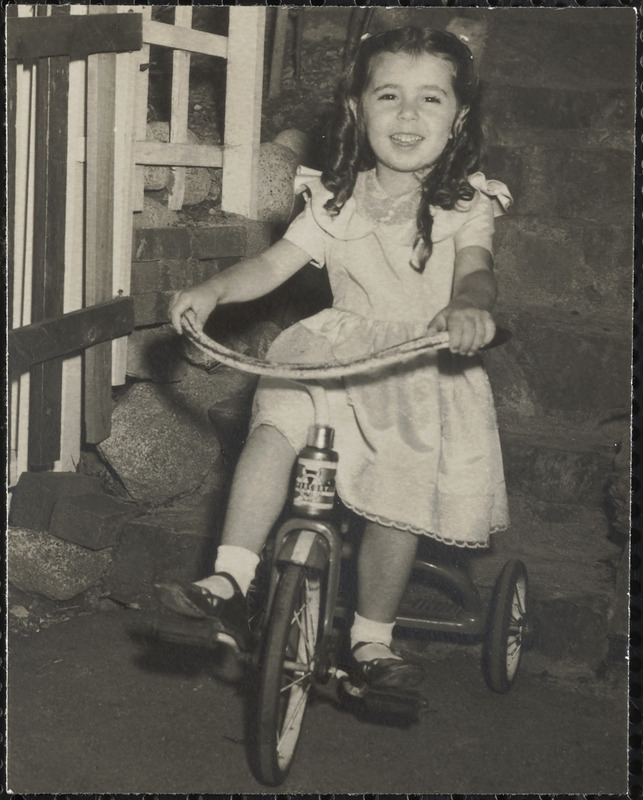
Girl riding a delta tricycle in 1952.

A delta tricycle has one front wheel and two rear wheels.

=== Tadpole ===
A tadpole tricycle has two front wheels and one rear wheel. Rear-wheel steering is sometimes used, although this increases the turning circle and can affect handling (the geometry is similar to a regular tricycle operating in reverse, but with a steering damper added).

=== Other ===
Some early pedal tricycles from the late 19th century used two wheels in tandem on one side and a larger driving wheel on the other.

An in-line three-wheeled vehicle has two steered wheels, one at the front and the other in the middle or at the rear.

== Types ==
=== Upright ===
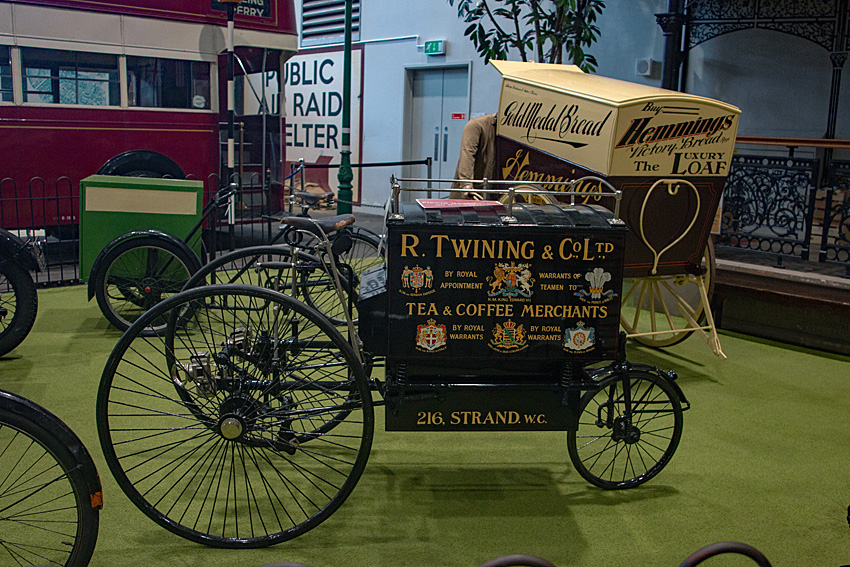
A freight tricycle formerly operated by Twinings.

Upright trikes resemble a two-wheeled bicycle, traditionally diamond frame, or open frame, but with either two widely spaced wheels at the back (called delta) or two wheels at the front (called tadpole). The rider straddles the frame in both delta and tadpole configurations. Steering is through a handlebar directly connected to the front wheel via a conventional bicycle fork in delta, or via a form of Ackermann steering geometry in the case of the upright tadpole.

All non-tilting trikes have stability issues and great care must be used when riding a non-tilting upright trike. The center of gravity is quite high compared to recumbent trikes. Because of this, non-tilting trikes are more prone to tipping over in corners and on uneven or sloping terrain. Conversely, the rider enjoys better visibility than on a recumbent because their head is higher.

=== Recumbent ===
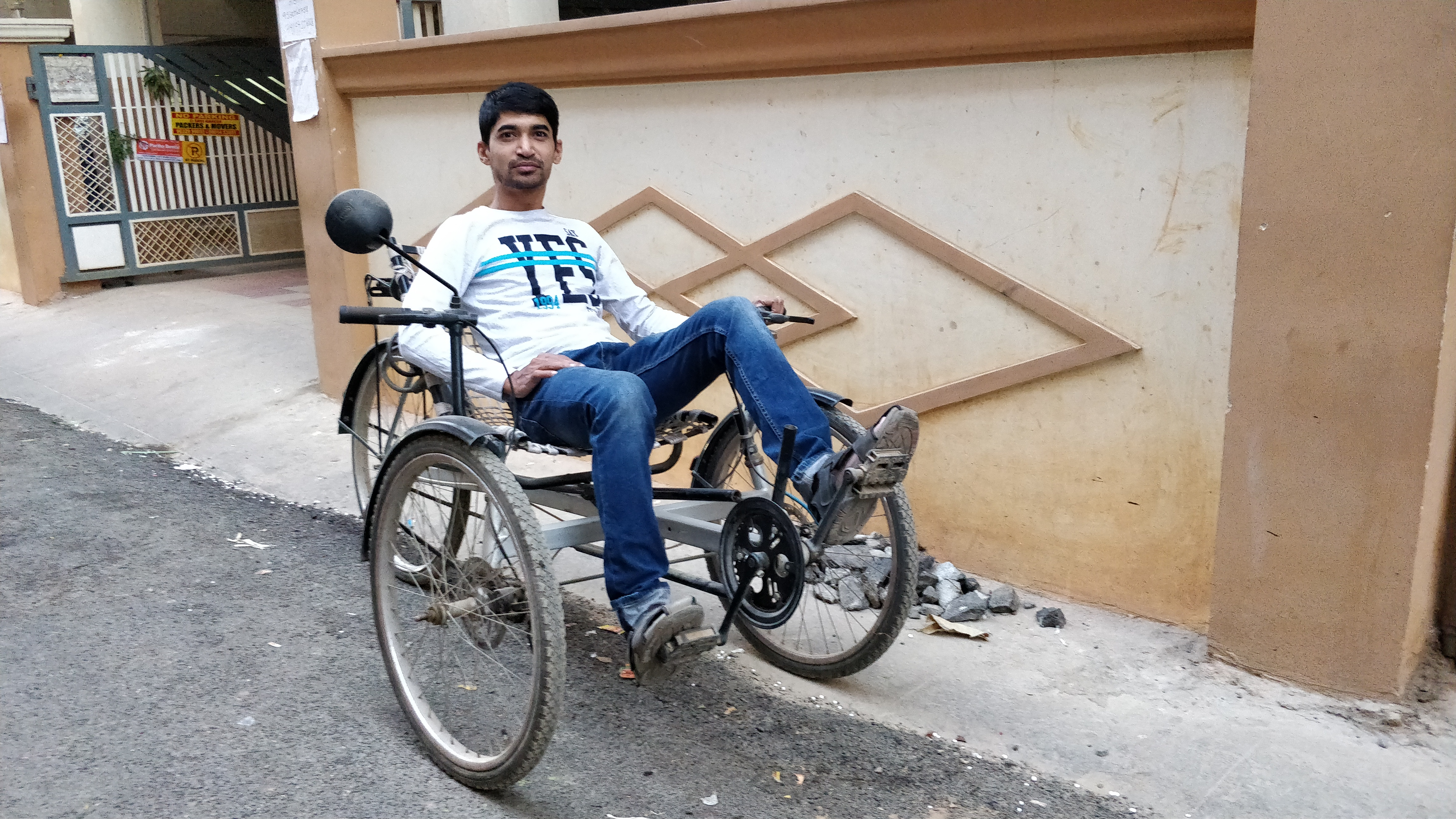
Recumbent tricycle

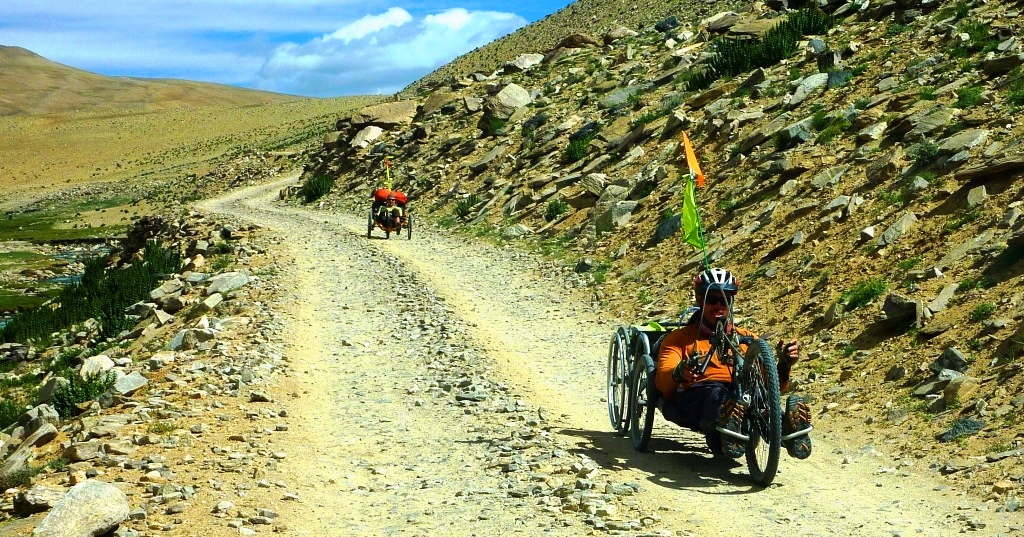
Recumbent handcrank driven tricycles on the road to Ladakh

Recumbent trikes' advantages (over conventional trikes) include stability (through low centre of gravity) and low aerodynamic drag. Disadvantages (compared to bicycles) include greater cost, weight, and width. The very low seat may make entry difficult, and on the road they may be less visible to other traffic.

==== Delta ====
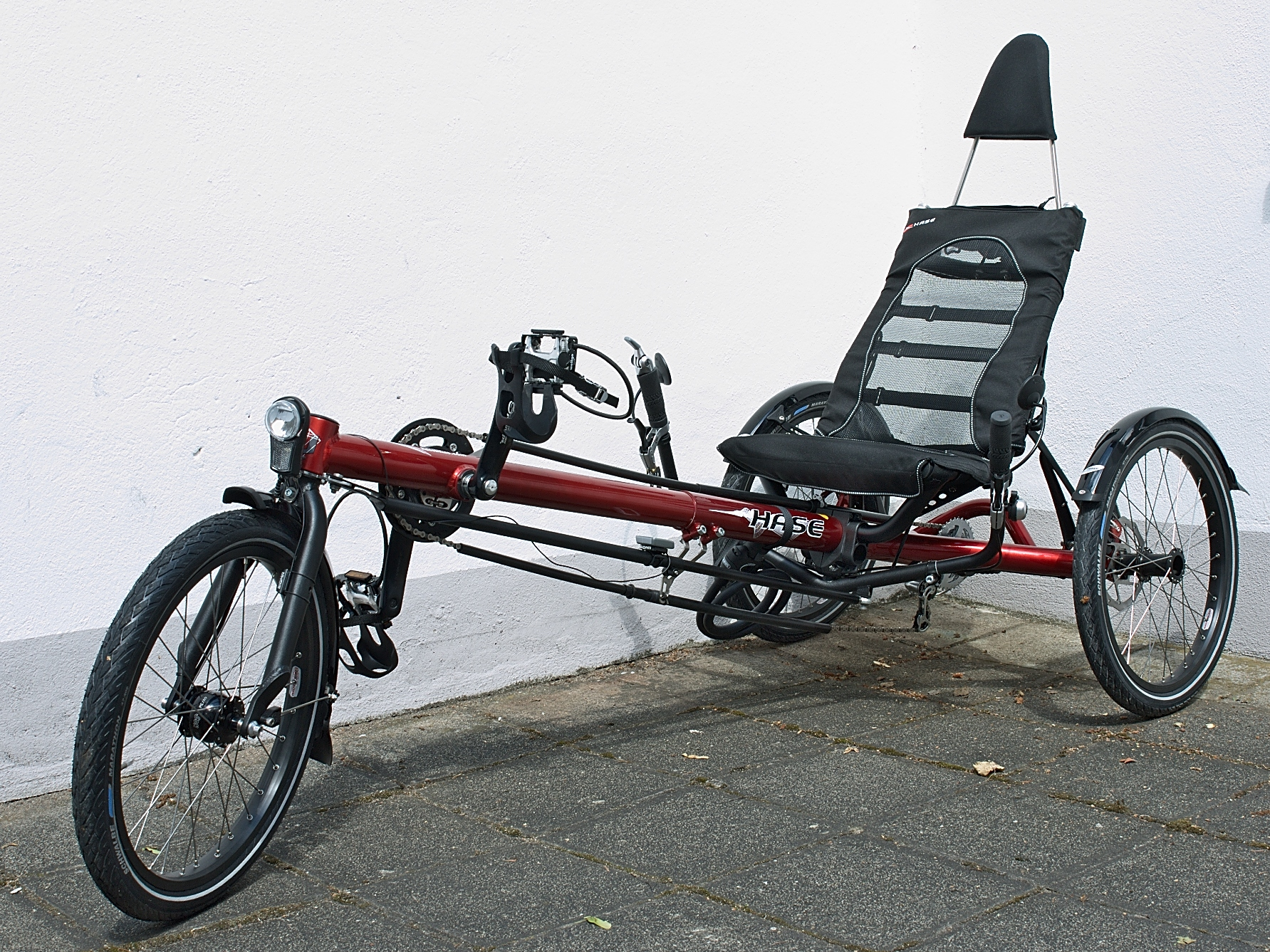
Delta layout Hase Spezialräder Kettwiesel

A recumbent delta is similar to an upright, with two wheels at the back and one at the front, but has a recumbent layout in which the rider is seated in a chair-like seat. One or both rear wheels can be driven, while the front is used for steering (the usual layout). Steering is either through a linkage, with the handlebars under the seat (under seat steering) or directly to the front wheel with a large handlebar (over seat steering). Some delta trikes can be stored upright by lifting the front wheel and resting the top of the seat on the ground.

Delta trikes generally have higher seats and a tighter turning radius than tadpole trikes. The tight turning radius is useful if riding on trails with offset barriers, or navigating around closely placed obstacles. The higher seat makes mounting and dismounting easier. Even with the higher seat a delta trike can be quite stable provided most of the weight (including the rider) is shifted back towards the rear wheels. Many delta trikes place the seat too far forward and that takes weight off the two rear wheels and puts more weight onto the front wheel, making the trike more unstable. The Hase Kettwiesel delta trike has an 18-inch-high (46 cm) seat that is placed to put most of the weight onto the cambered rear wheels, making it more stable.

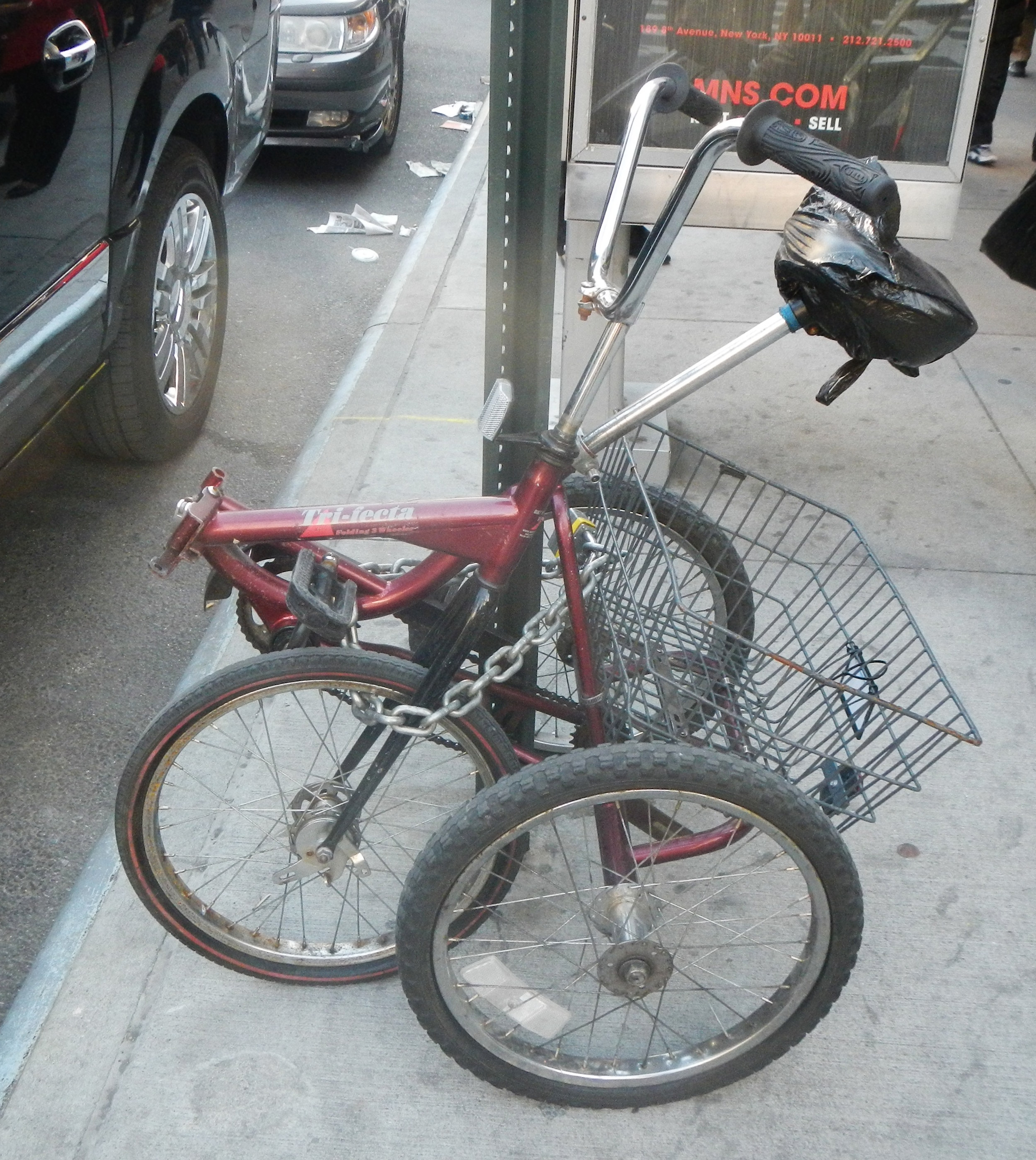
Small folded delta trike parked in New York

Delta trikes are suitable to be used as manual scooters for mobility, rehabilitation and/or exercise. The Hase Lepus Comfort is an example of a rehabilitation delta trike designed mainly for comfort and ease of use. It has a lowered front boom and the seat can be adjusted to a height of 20 to 28 in (510 to 710 mm), which aids in mounting and dismounting. It also has rear wheel suspension for comfort. The 56 lb (25 kg) Lepus can be folded for easier storage and transportation.

The weight of a delta trike can be quite close to the weight of a tadpole trike if they are both of a similar quality and similar materials are used. The Hase Kettwiesel Allround delta trike has an aluminium frame and weighs 39.4 lbs (17.9 kg). The Catrike Road tadpole trike has an aluminium frame and weighs 37.5 lbs (17 kg).

==== Tadpole ====
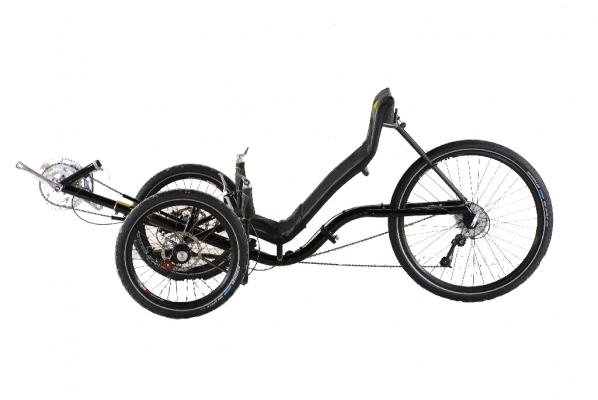
Recumbent tadpole

The recumbent tadpole or reverse trike is a recumbent design with two steered wheels at the front and one driven wheel at the back, though one model has the front wheels driven while the rear wheel steers. Steering is either through a single handlebar linked with tie rods to the front wheels' stub axle assemblies (indirect) or with two handlebars (rather, two half-handlebars) each bolted to a steerer tube, usually through a bicycle-type headset and connected to a stub axle assembly (direct). A single tie rod connects the left and right axle assemblies.

The tadpole trike is often used by middle-aged or retiree-age former bicyclists who are tired of the associated pains from normal upright bikes. With its extremely low center of gravity, aerodynamic layout and light weight (for trikes), tadpoles are considered the highest-performance trikes.

Most velomobiles are built in a tadpole trike configuration since a wide front and narrow rear offer superior aerodynamics to a delta trike configuration.

==== Hand-crank ====
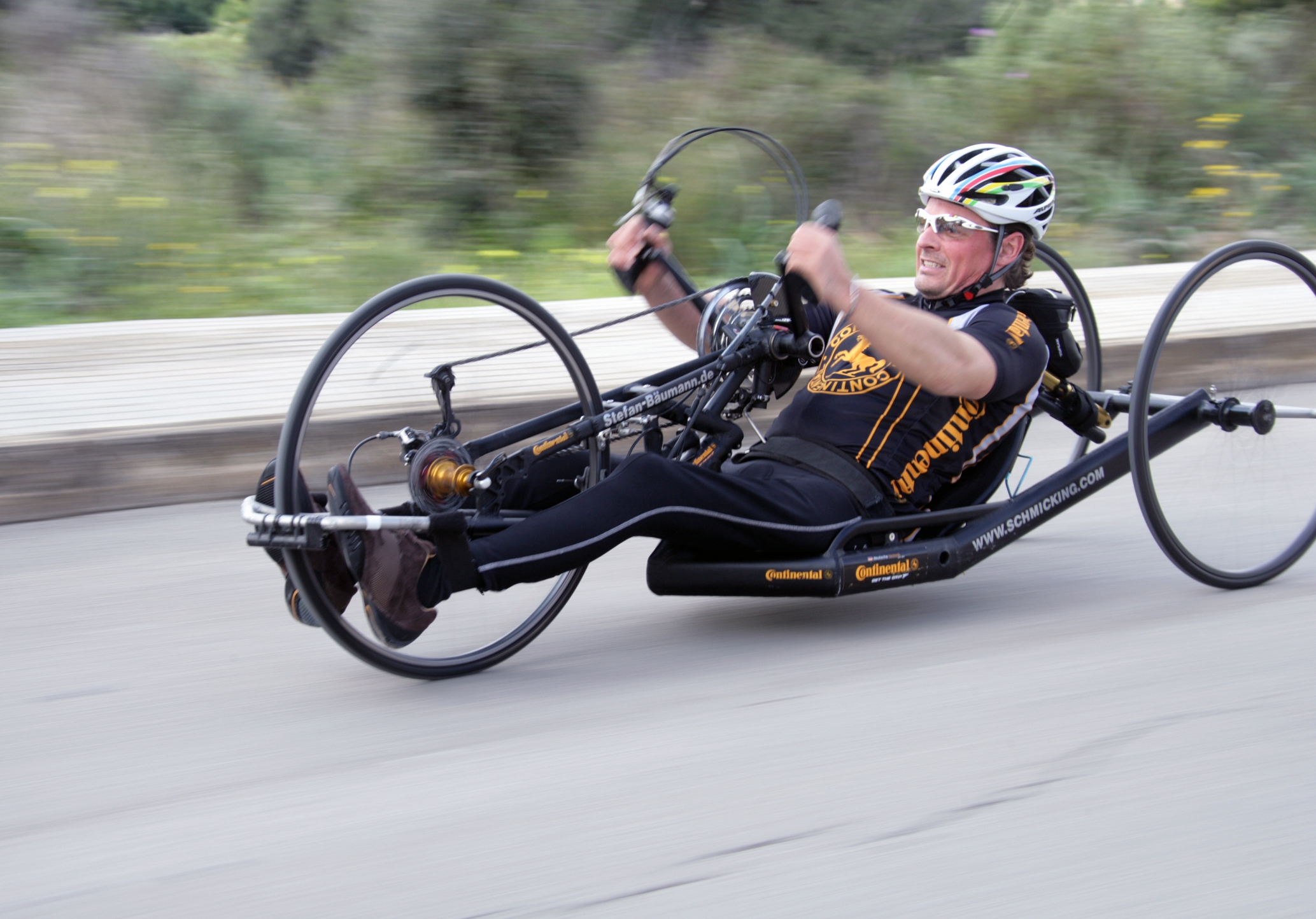
Racing handcycle

Hand-crank trikes use a hand-operated crank, either as a sole source of power or a double drive with footpower from pedals and hand-power from the hand crank. The hand-power-only trikes can be used by individuals who do not have the use of their legs due to a disability or an injury. They are made by companies including Greenspeed, Invacare, Quickie and Druzin.

In case of paralysis of the legs, more speed and range of distance can be obtained by adding functional electrical stimulation to the legs. The large leg muscles are activated by electrical impulses synchronized with the hand cranking movement.

==== Tandem ====
Recumbent tandem trikes allow two people to ride in a recumbent position with an extra-strong backbone frame to hold the extra weight. Some allow the "captain" (the rider who steers) and "stoker" (the rider who only pedals) to pedal at different speeds. They are often made with couplers so the frames can be broken down into pieces for easier transport. Manufacturers of recumbent trikes include Greenspeed, WhizWheelz and Inspired Cycle Engineering.

=== Rickshaw ===
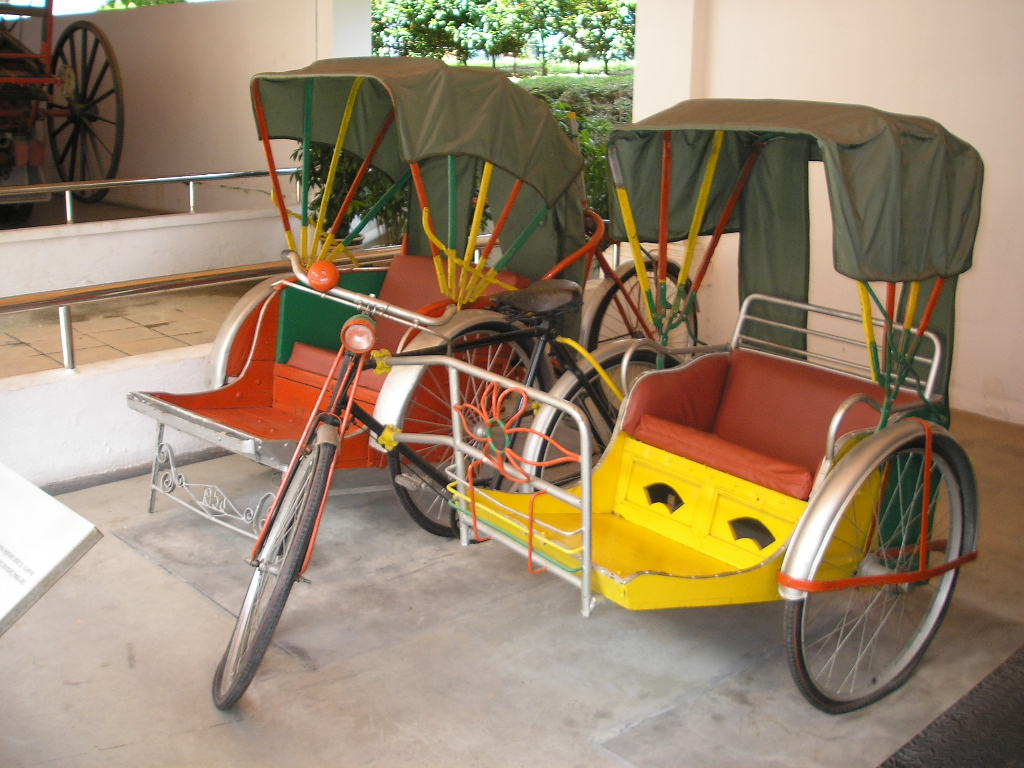
Two kinds of tricycle rickshaw

Most cycle rickshaws, used for carrying passengers for hire, are tricycles with one steering wheel in the front and two wheels in the back supporting a seating area for one or two passengers. Cycle rickshaws often have a parasol or canopy to protect the passengers from sun and rain. These vehicles are widely used in South Asia and Southeast Asia, where rickshaw driving provides essential employment for recent immigrants from rural areas, generally impoverished men. In the 1990s and first decade of the 21st century, rickshaws became increasingly popular in big cities in Britain, Europe and the United States, where they provide urban transportation, novelty rides, and serve as advertising media.

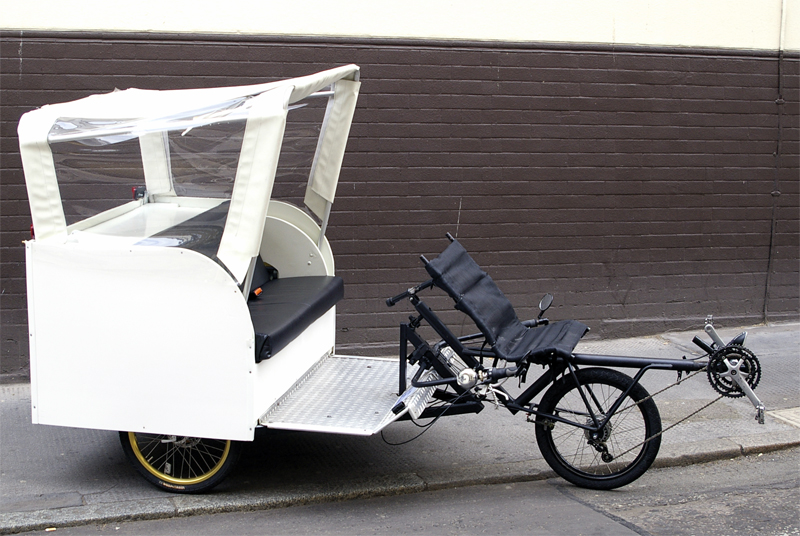
Spidertrike

Spidertrike is a recumbent cycle rickshaw that is used in central London and operated by Eco Chariots. The trike pictured is called the SUV (Sensible Utility Vehicle) and is produced by the company Organic Engines, which operates in Florida in the United States. It is a front wheel drive tricycle, articulated behind the driver seat, and has hydraulic double disc brakes and internal hub gears. The passenger is protected from rain and sun with a canopy.

=== Freight ===
Urban delivery trikes are designed and constructed for transporting large loads. These trikes include a cargo area consisting of a steel tube carrier, an open or enclosed box, a flat platform, or a large, heavy-duty wire basket. These are usually mounted over one or both wheels, low behind the front wheel, or between parallel wheels at either the front or rear of the vehicle, to keep the center of gravity low. The frame and drivetrain must be constructed to handle loads several times that of an ordinary bicycle; as such, extra low gears may be added. Other specific design considerations include operator visibility and load suspension. Many, but not all, cycles used for the purpose of vending goods such as ice cream cart trikes or hot dog vending trikes are cargo bicycles.

Many freight trikes are of the tadpole configuration, with the cargo box (platform, etc.) mounted between the front wheels. India and China are significant strongholds of the rear-loading "delta" carrier trike. Freight trikes are also designed for indoor use in large warehouses or industrial plants. The advantage of using freight trikes rather than a motor vehicle is that there is no exhaust, which means that the trike can be used inside warehouses. While another option is electric golf cart-style vehicles, freight trikes are human-powered, so they do not have the maintenance required to keep batteries on golf carts charged up.

Common uses include:

- Delivery services in dense urban environments
- Food vending in high foot traffic areas (including specialist ice cream bikes)
- Transporting trade tools, including around large installations such as power stations and CERN
- Airport cargo handling
- Recycling collections
- Warehouse inventory transportation
- Mail
- Food collection
- Child transport (in Amsterdam, freight trikes are used primarily to carry children)
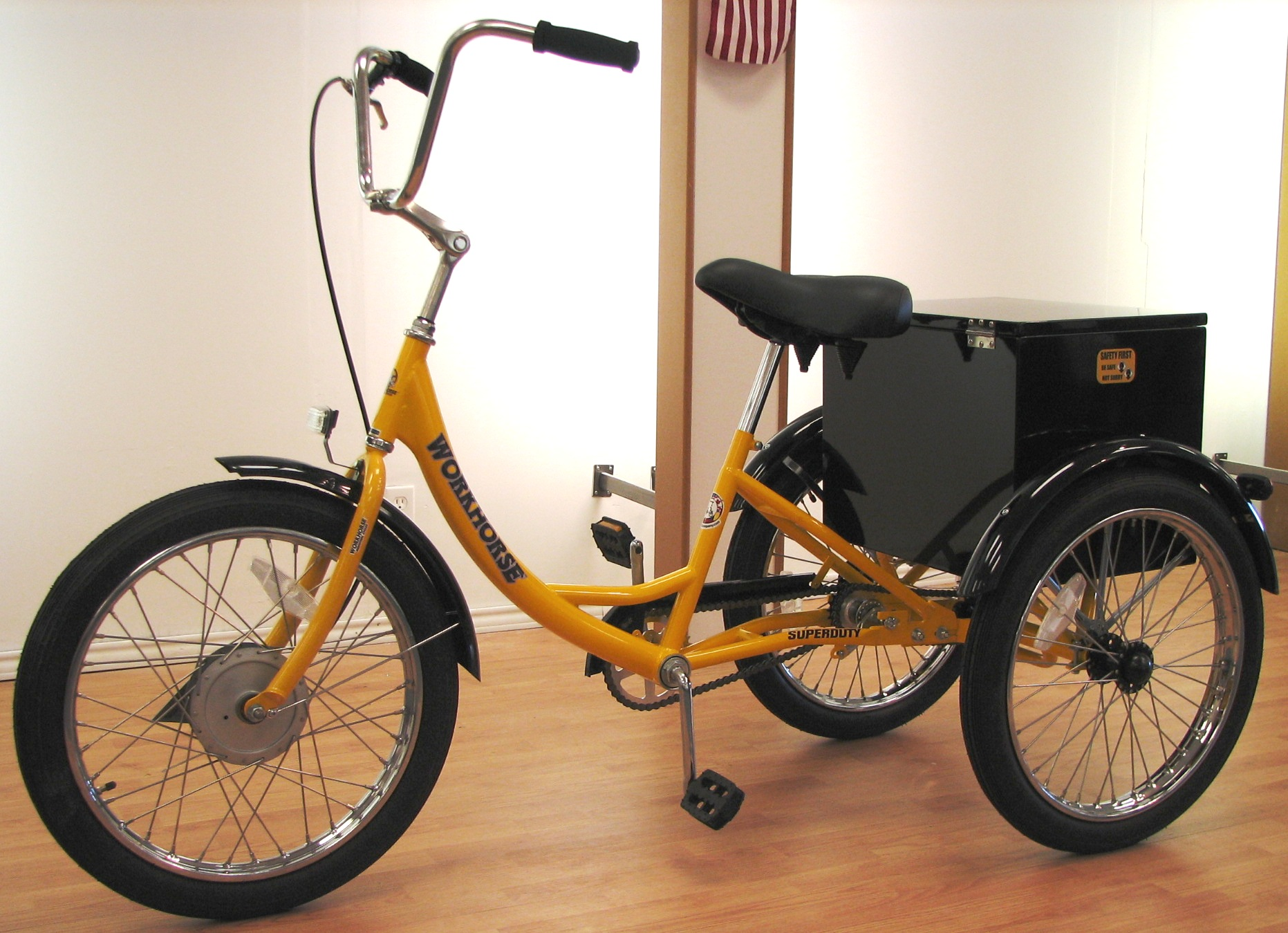
Industrial trike with storage box mounted between rear wheels

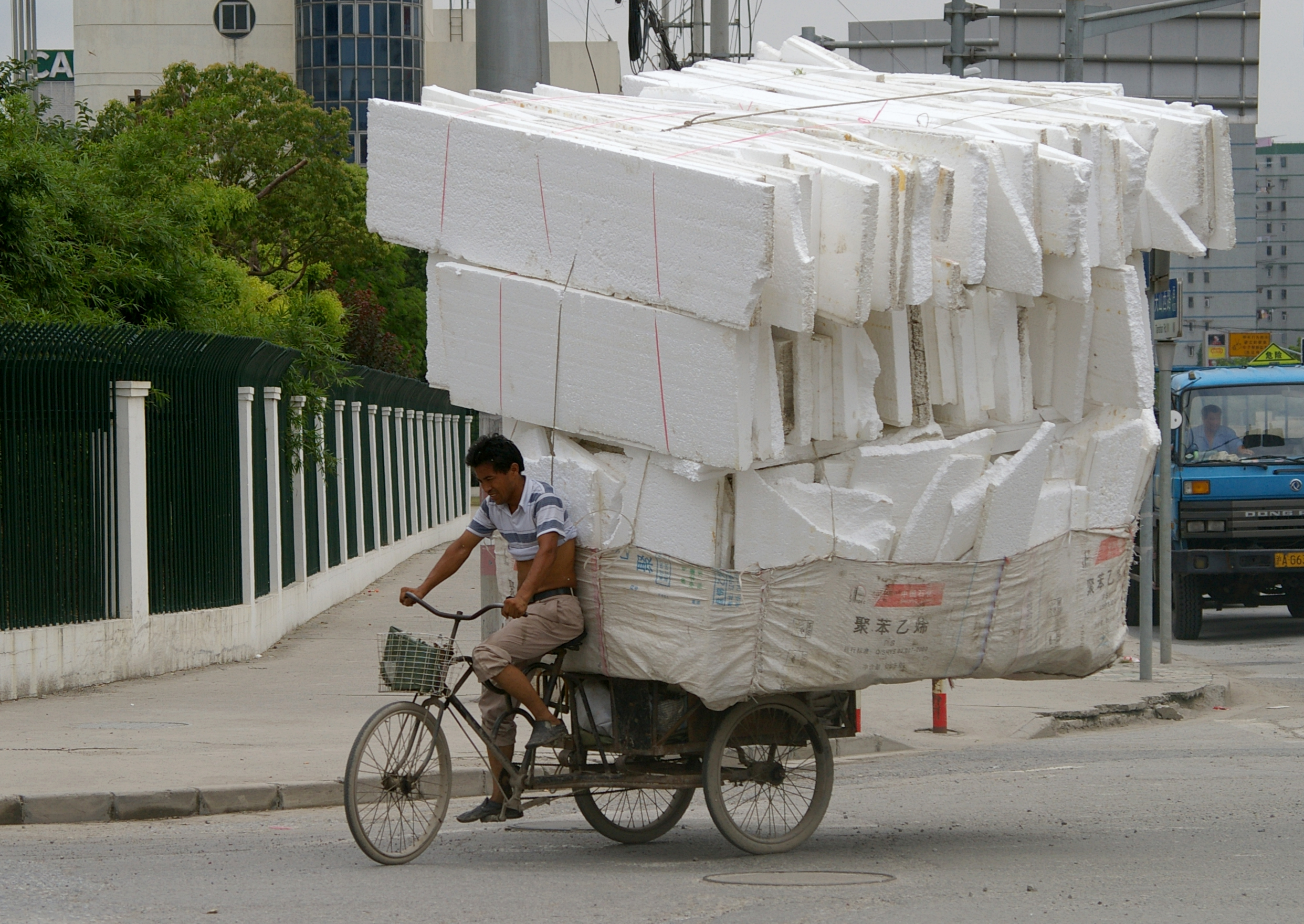
Freight trike in Shanghai

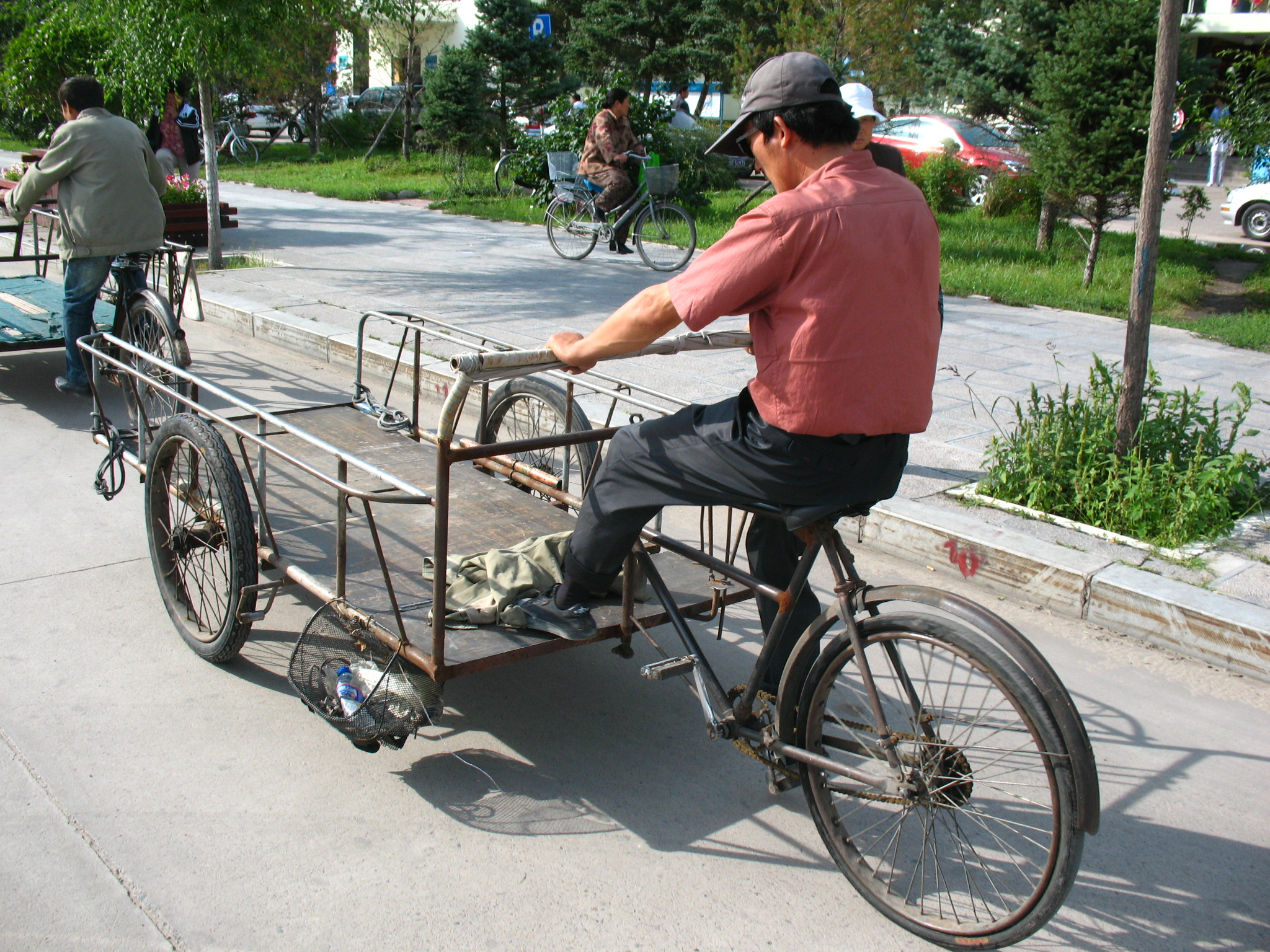
High-mass counter-direction tricycle

=== Children's ===
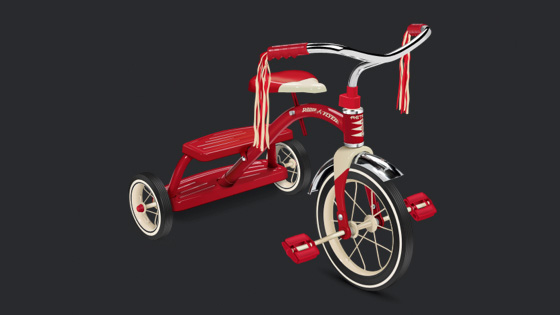
Children's tricycle

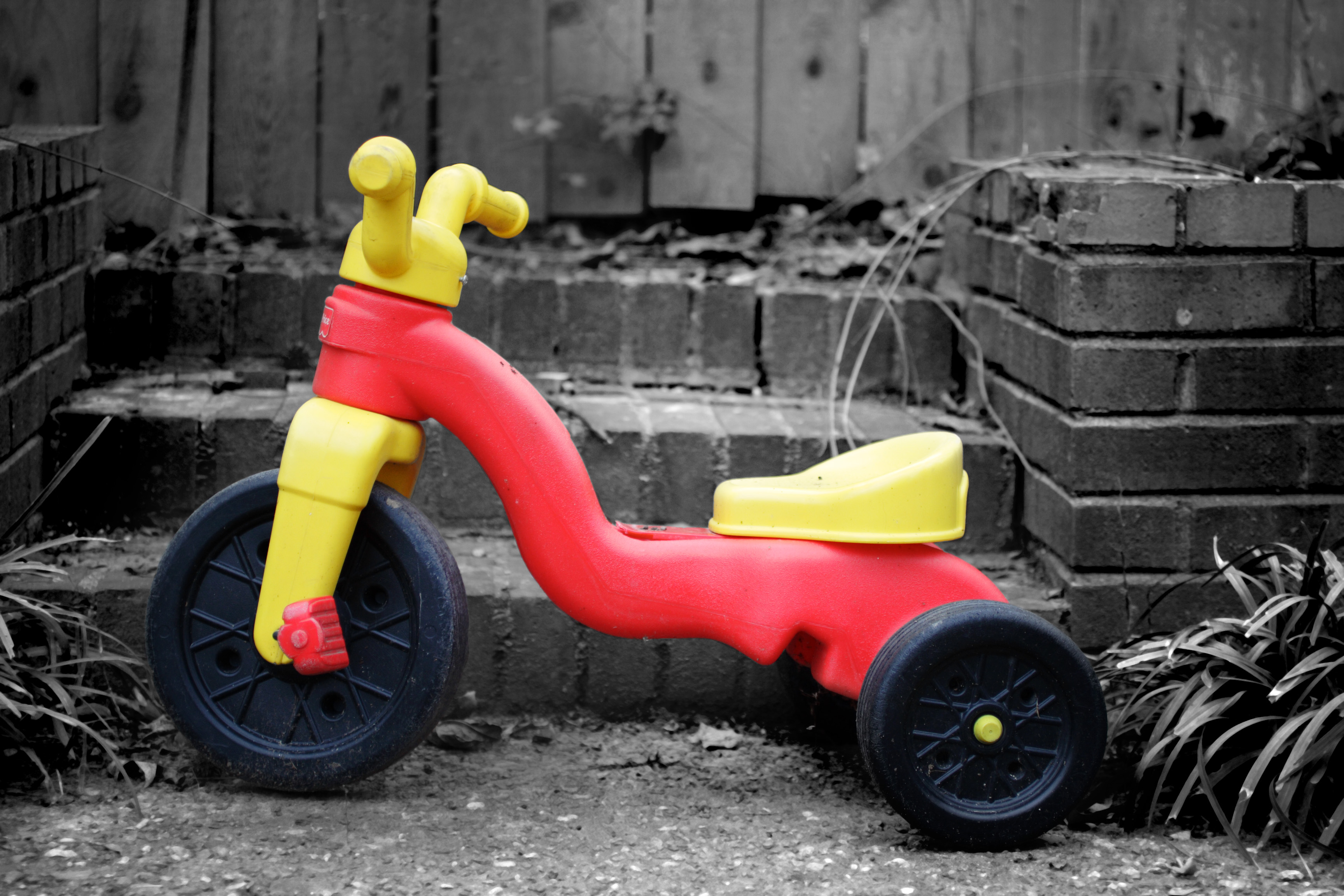
Children's plastic tricycle

A tricycle is a typical toy for children between the ages of eighteen months and five years before a balance bike. Compared to adult models, children's trikes are simpler, without brakes or gears, and often with crude front-drive. Child trikes can be unstable, particularly if the wheelbase or track are insufficient. Some trikes have a push bar so adults can control the trike. Child trikes have frames made of metal, plastic, or wood.

Children's trikes can have pedals directly driving the front wheels, allowing braking with the pedals, or they can use chain drive the rear wheels, often without a differential, so one rear wheel spins free. Children's trikes do not always have pneumatic tires, having instead wheels of solid rubber or hollow plastic. While this may add to the weight of the tricycle and reduces the shock-absorbing qualities, it eliminates the possibility of punctures. Pull brakes are rarely fitted to front-drive trikes, but the child can slow the trike down by resisting the forward motion through the pedals.

=== Drift ===
Drift trikes are a variety of tricycle with slick rear wheels, enabling them to drift, being countersteered round corners. They are commonly used for gravity-powered descents of paved roads with steep gradients.

=== Hand and foot ===
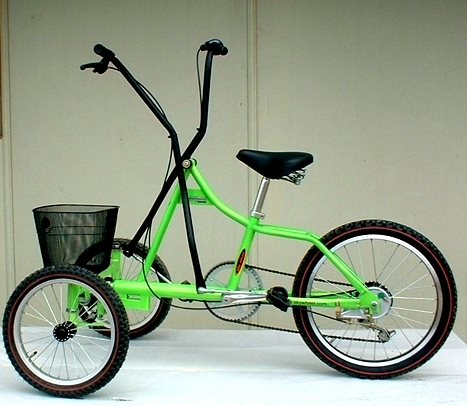
Hand and foot trike

With hand and foot trikes, the rider makes a pair of front wheels change directions by shifting the center of weight and moves forward by rotating the rear wheel. The hand and foot trike can be also converted into a manual tricycle designed to be driven with both hands and both feet. There are also new hybrids between a handcycle, a recumbent bike and a tricycle, these bikes make it even possible to cycle with legs despite a spinal cord injury.

=== Tilting ===
Tricycles have been constructed that tilt in the direction of a turn, as a bicycle does, to avoid rolling over without a wide axle track. Examples have included upright, recumbent, delta, and tadpole configurations.

== Conversion sets ==
Tricycle conversion sets or kits convert a bicycle to an upright tricycle. Tricycle kit can remove the front wheel and mounts two wheels under the handlebars for a quick and easy conversion.

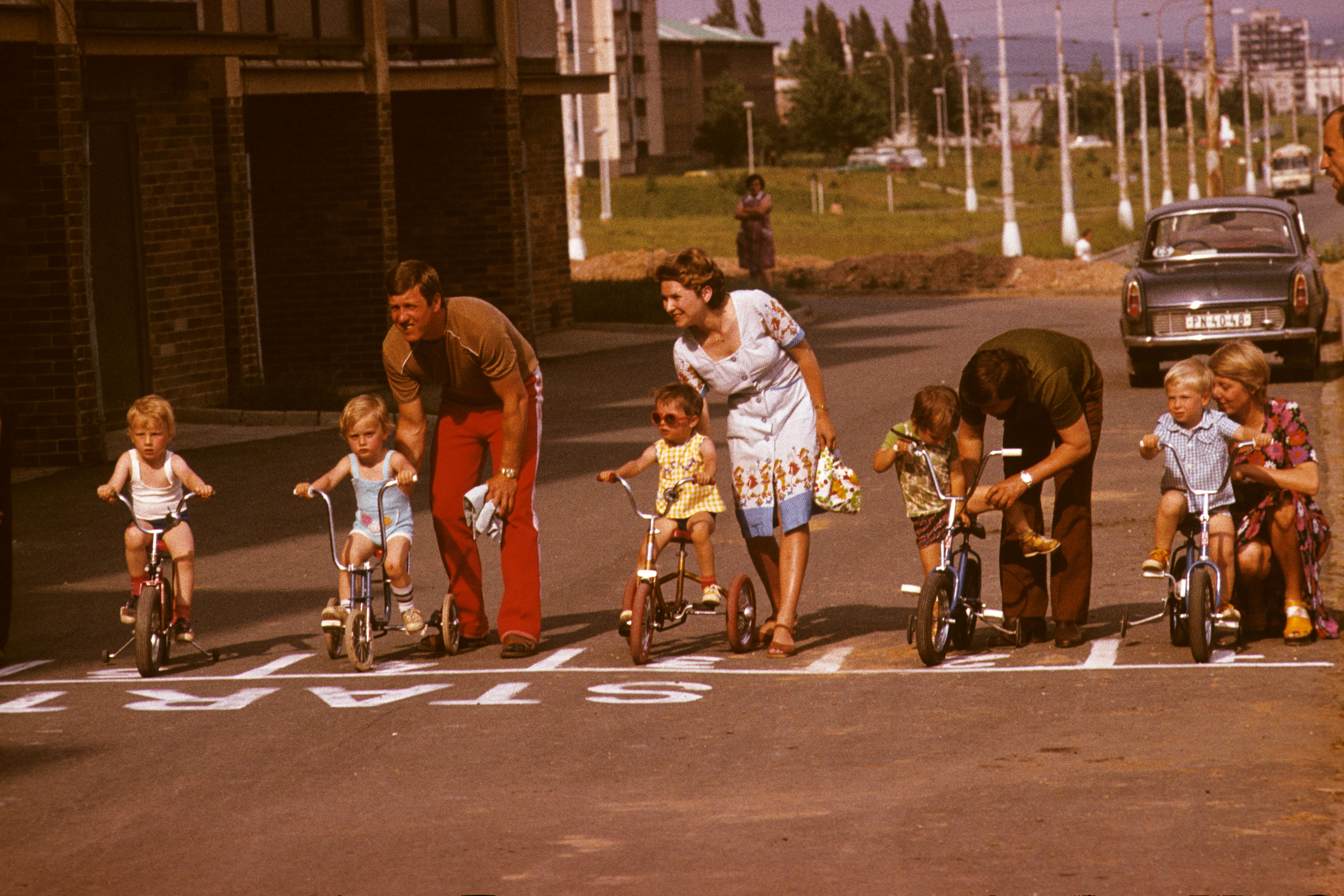
Children compete on tricycles and side wheels in the eighties in Czechoslovakia

The advantages of a trike conversion set include lower cost compared with new hand built tricycles and the freedom to choose almost any donor bicycle frame. Tricycle conversion sets tend to be heavier than a high quality, hand built, sports, touring or racing tricycle. Conversion sets can give the would-be serious tricyclist a taste of triking before making the final decision to purchase a complete tricycle. Conversion sets can also supplied ready to be brazed onto a lightweight, steel bicycle frame to form a complete trike.

Some trike conversion sets can also be used with recumbent bicycles to form recumbent trikes.

== Operation ==
Adults may find upright tricycles difficult to ride because of familiarity with the counter-steering required to balance a bicycle. The variation in the camber of the road is the principal difficulty to be overcome once basic tricycle handling is mastered. Recumbent trikes are less affected by camber and, depending on track width and riding position, capable of very fast cornering. Some trikes are tilting three-wheelers, which lean into corners much as bicycles do.

In the case of delta tricycles, the drive is often to just one of the rear wheels, though in some cases both wheels are driven through a differential. A double freewheel, preferably using no-backlash roller clutches, is considered superior. Trikes with a differential often use an internally geared hub as a gearbox in a 'mid drive' system. A jackshaft drive permits either single or two-wheel drive. Tadpoles generally use a bicycle's rear wheel drive and for that reason are usually lighter, cheaper and easier to replace and repair.

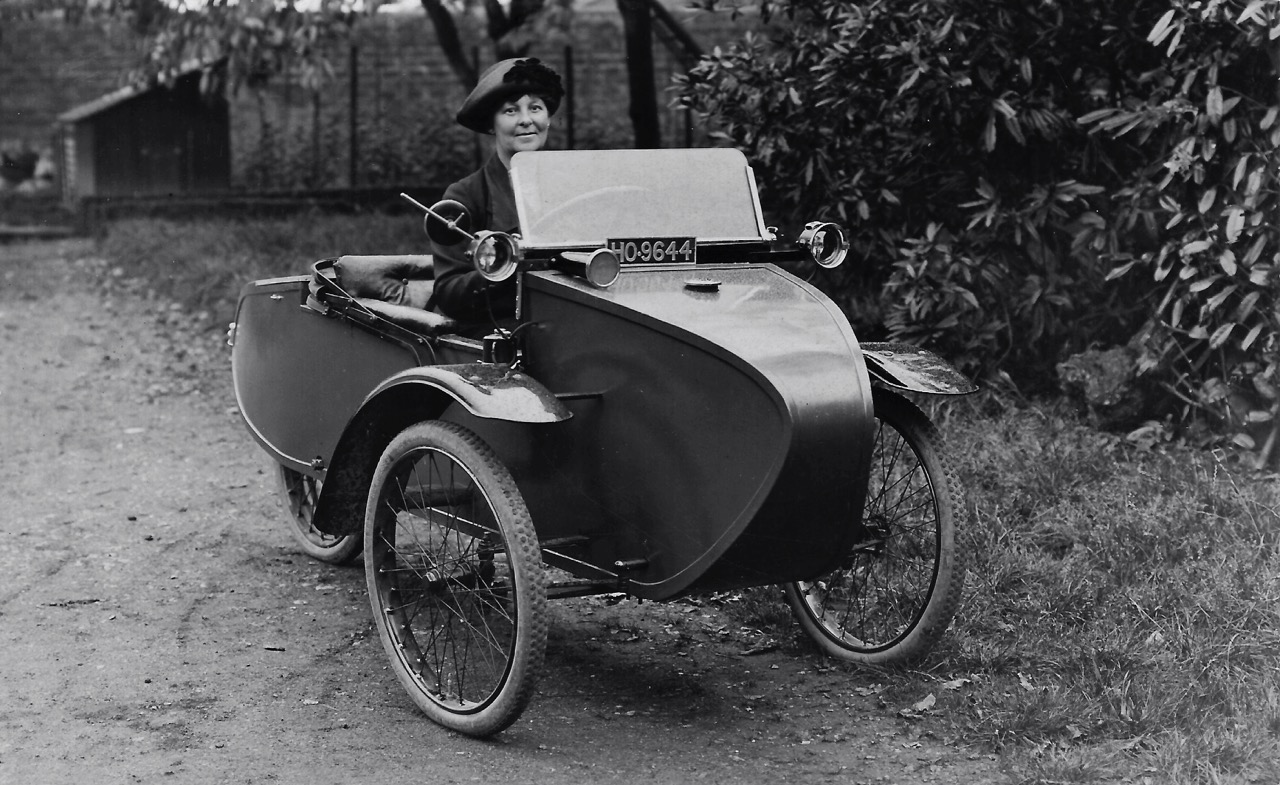
Ivy Partridge in a motorized tricycle

=== Braking ===
Some trikes use a geometry (also called center point steering) with the kingpin axis intersecting the ground directly ahead of the tire contact point, producing a normal amount of trail. This arrangement, elsewhere called "zero scrub radius" is used to mitigate the effects of one-sided braking on steering. While zero scrub can reduce steering feel and increase wandering it can also protect novices from spinning out and/or flipping. Tadpole trikes tend also to use Ackermann steering geometry, perhaps with both front brakes operated by the stronger hand. While the KMX Kart stunt trike with this setup allows the rear brake to be operated separately, letting the rider do "bootlegger turns", the standard setup for most trikes has the front brake for each side operated by each hand. The center-of-mass of most tadpole trikes is close to the front wheels, making the rear brake less useful. The rear brake may instead be connected to a latching brake lever for use as a parking brake when stopped on a hill.

Recumbent trikes often brake one wheel with each hand, allowing the rider to brake one side alone to pull the trike in that direction.

== Records ==
On 1 July 2005, Sudhakar Yadav from India rode a tricycle in Hyderabad with a height of 12.67 metres (41.6 ft), a wheel diameter of 5.18 metres (17.0 ft) and length of 11.37 metres (37.3 ft). This tricycle is exhibited at the Sudha Cars Museum and has been verified as the largest tricycle by the Guinness World Records.

== See also ==
- List of land vehicles types by number of wheels
- List of motorized trikes
- Puppet Bike, a Chicago street performer group that uses a tricycle as a stage
- Motorized tricycle, a motorized type of freight tricycle which is highly popular in the Philippines
- Three-wheeler, a term used especially for three-wheeled automobiles
