= Altdorf bei Nürnberg =

- Town
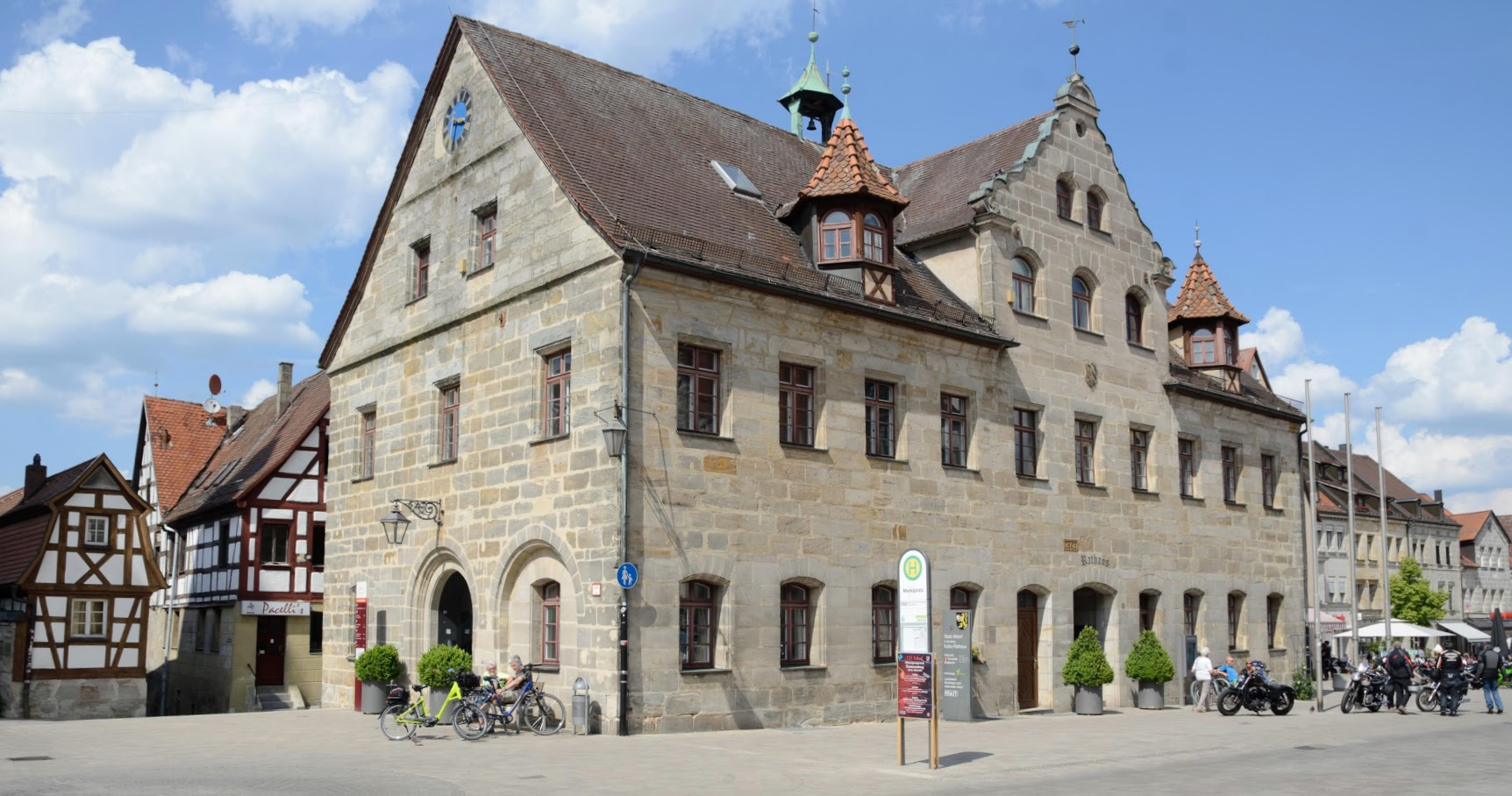
- Former town hall

- Coat of arms

- Location of Altdorf bei Nürnberg within Nürnberger Land district
- Interactive map of Altdorf bei Nürnberg
- Location within Germany Location within Bavaria
- Coordinates: 49°23′15″N 11°21′25″E
- Country: Germany
- State: Bavaria
- Admin. region: Mittelfranken
- District: Nürnberger Land
- Subdivisions: 25 Stadtteile

Government
  - Mayor (2020–26): Martin Tabor (SPD)

Area
  - Total: 48.59 km^{2} (18.76 sq mi)
- Elevation: 444 m (1,457 ft)

Population (2025-12-31)
  - Total: 15,527
  - Density: 319.6/km^{2} (827.6/sq mi)
- Time zone: UTC+01:00 (CET)
  - Summer (DST): UTC+02:00 (CEST)
- Postal codes: 90518
- Dialling codes: 09187
- Vehicle registration: LAU, ESB, HEB, N, PEG
- Website: www.altdorf.de

Altdorf bei Nürnberg (/ˈɑːltdɔːrf/ AHLT-dorf, German: [ˈaltdɔʁf baɪ ˈnʏʁnbɛʁk]; Northern Bavarian: Oiddorf) is a town in south-eastern Germany. It is situated 25 km (16 mi) east of Nuremberg, in the district Nürnberger Land. Its name literally means “Altdorf near Nuremberg”, to distinguish it from other Altdorfs.

== History ==
Altdorf is first mentioned in 1129. In 1504 the town was conquered by the Free Imperial City of Nuremberg. In the 16th century, the city government of Nuremberg founded an academy in Altdorf, which became a university in 1622. The university lasted until 1809. Among the alumni of the University of Altdorf were the soldier Albrecht von Wallenstein and the philosopher and scientist Gottfried Leibniz.

=== Discovery of teleosaur fossils ===
Teleosaur remains have been known from Altdorf bei Nürnberg since 1832, but none have been placed in a specific genus yet.

== Economy ==
Even though the times of its once famous university have long passed, Altdorf is the seat of several educational institutions. It is also the home of a number of mid-scale industrial enterprises.

== Monuments ==
Altdorf's chief monuments are the church of St. Laurentius, the city hall and the Wichernhaus, which once housed the university. Altdorf also boasts some impressive remnants of its fortifications.

== International relations ==
Altdorf bei Nürnberg is twinned with:

- Altdorf, Switzerland
- Colbitz, Saxony-Anhalt
- Sehma, Saxony
- Dunaharaszti, Hungary
- Pfitsch, South Tyrol (Italy)

== Mayors ==
List of mayors since 1852
Term of office	Mayor
1852–1857	Karl Maier
1857–1860	Karl Woerlein
1860–1863	Gottlieb Omeis
1863–1865	Friedrich Holz
1865–1869	Georg Späth
1870–1884	Georg Pfriem
1884–1887	Jakob Uebler
1888–1899	Andreas Heydner
1900–1901	Jakob Zantner
1902–1921	Karl Zeh
1921–1924	Hans Bachinger
1925–1933	Georg Oechslein
1933–1945	Georg Pickel
May–July 1945	Hans Dötsch
August 1945–April 1948	Fritz Pranz
May 1948–April 1960	Hans Dötsch
May 1960–June 1972	Heinrich Späth
July 1972–October 1982	Kurt Purucker
November 1982–October 1994	Friedrich Weißkopf
November 1994–October 2006	Rainer Pohl (SPD)
November 2006–April 2020	Erich Odörfer (CSU)
since May 2020	Martin Tabor (SPD)

== Gallery ==
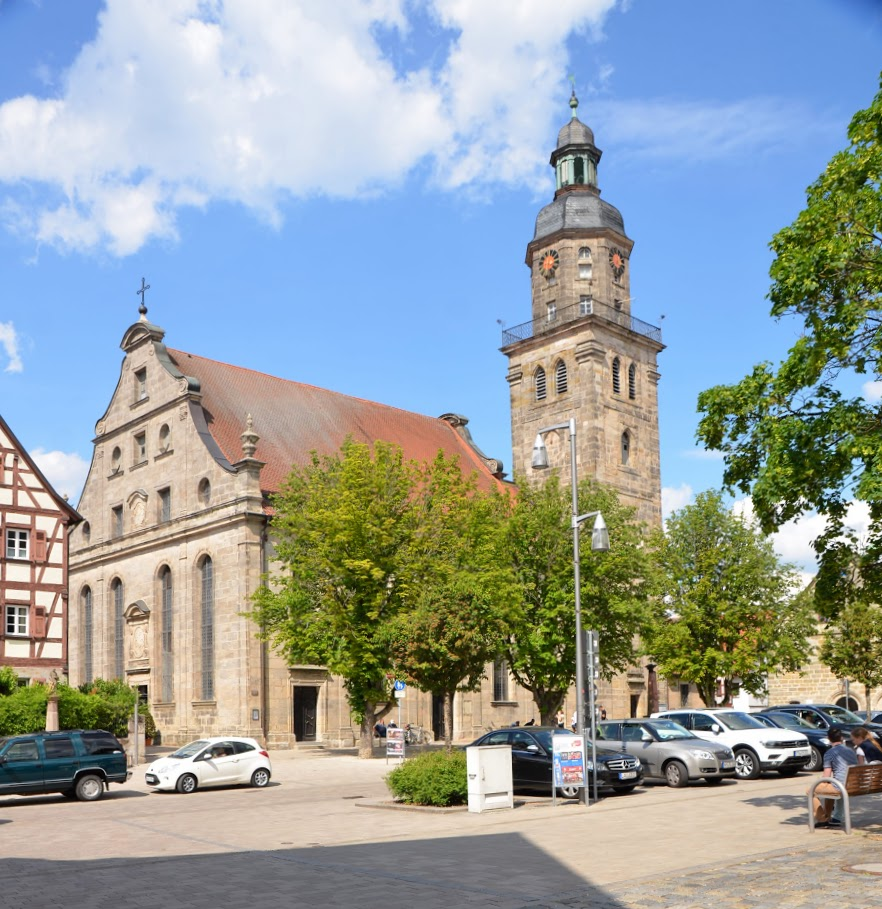
Church of Saint Lawrence

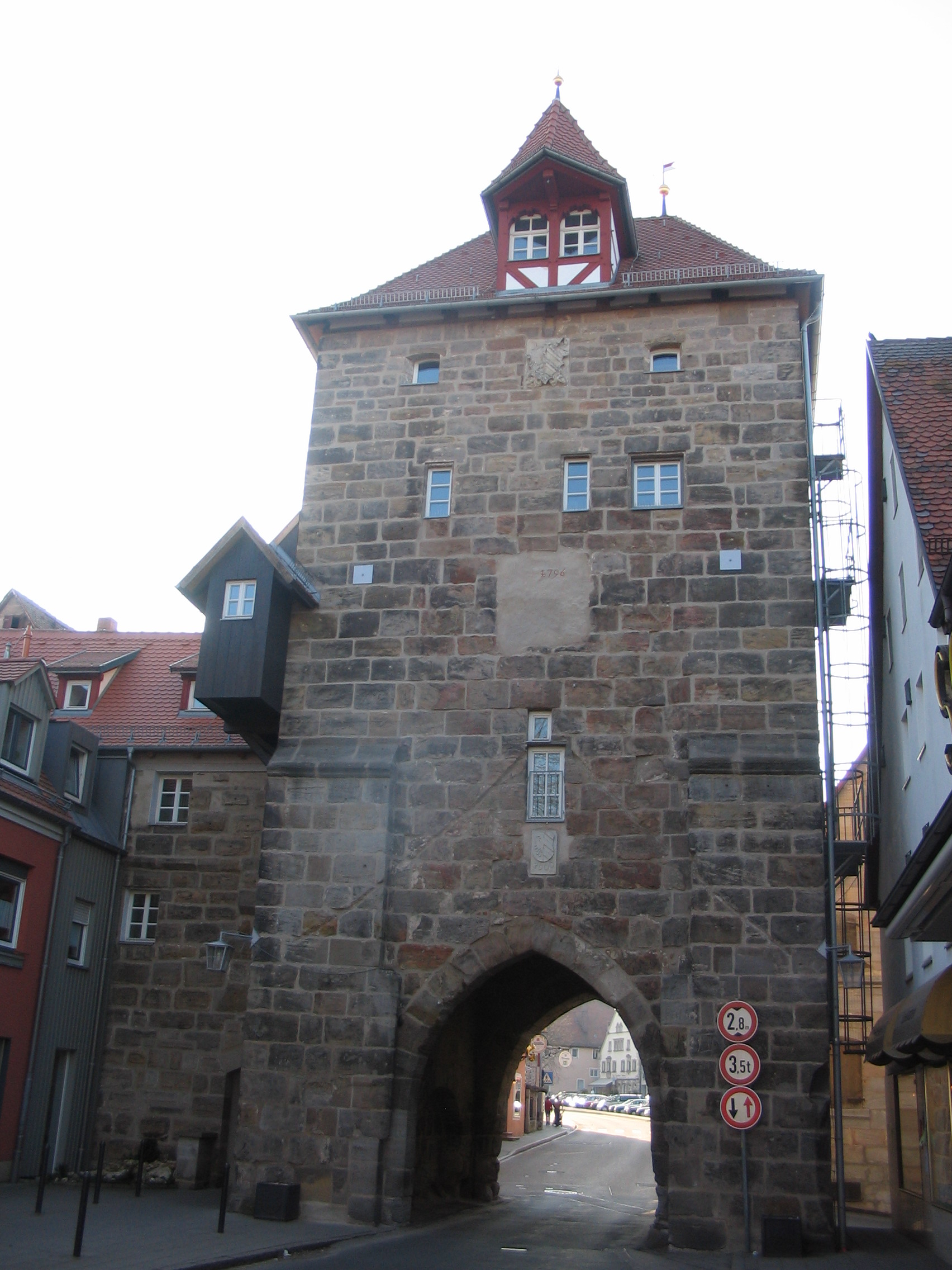
The lower gate (Unteres Tor) in 2005

== Sons and daughters of the town ==
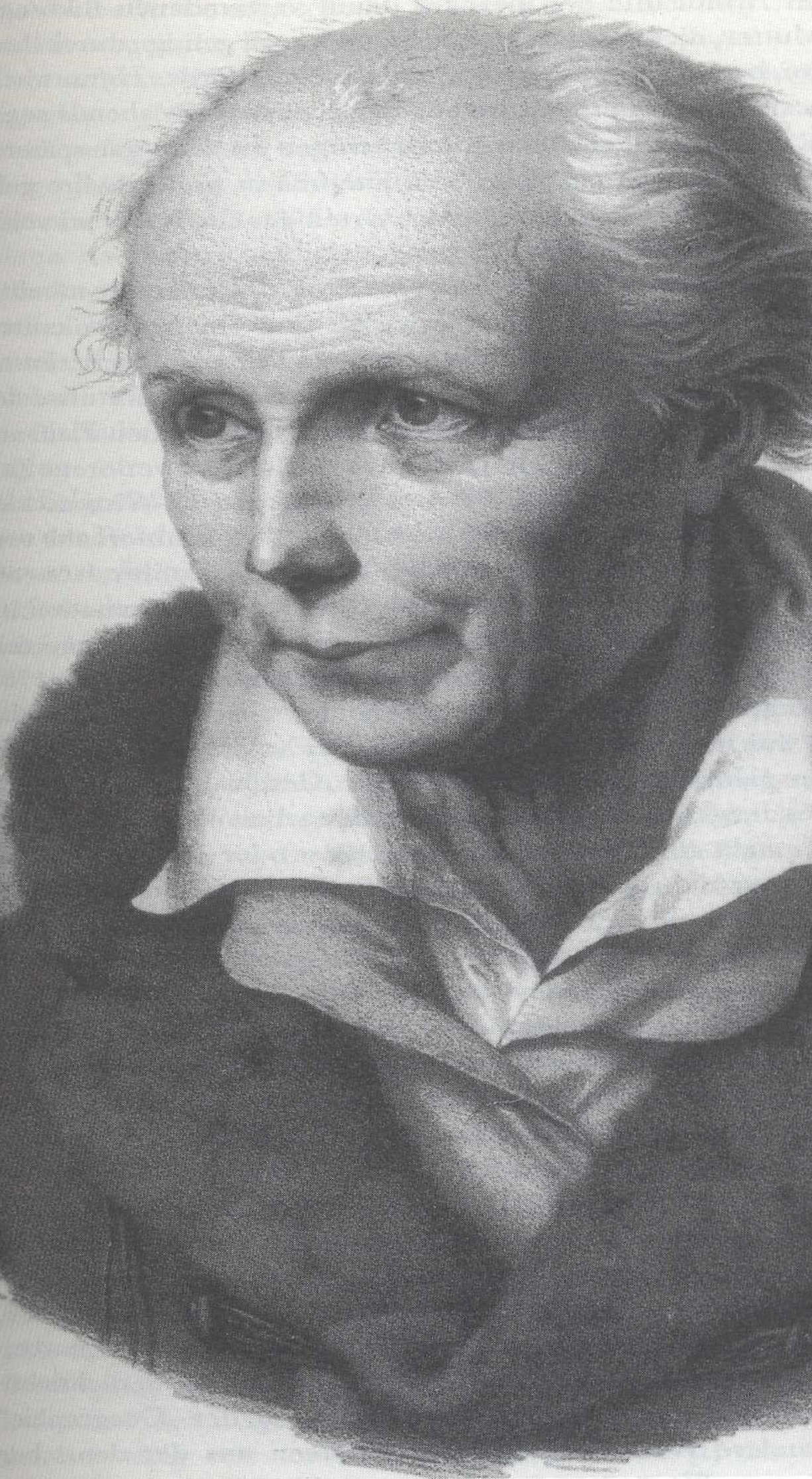
Konrad Mannert

- Stephan Farffler (1633–1689), inventor
- Johann Fabricius (1644–1729), theologian
- Moses Ferst (1828–1889), successful businessman in the United States
- Konrad Mannert (1756–1834), professor and historian
- Friedrichs Lachs (1832–1910), Bavarian-Swedish brewmaster
- Dora Hitz (1856–1924), Impressionist painter
- Klaus Kreuzeder (1950–2014), saxophonist
- Klaus Wolfermann (1946–2024), athlete (javelin thrower), Olympic champion
- Thomas Tuschl (born 1966), biochemist

== Personalities who worked in the town ==
- Johann Richter or Johannes Praetorius (1537–1616), German mathematician and astronomer
- Wallenstein (1583–1634), military leader and politician in the Thirty Years' War
- Abdias Treu (1597–1669), mathematician; taught in Altdorf; also rector of the University of Altdorf
- Johann Christoph Wagenseil (1633–1705), polyhistor, legal scholar and orientalist; taught and died in Altdorf
- Gottfried Wilhelm Leibniz (1646–1716), philosopher and natural scientist, promoted in Altdorf
- Johann Pachelbel (1653–1706), composer, studied at the University of Altdorf
- Lorenz Heister (1683–1758), surgical professor at the University of Altdorf from 1710 to 1719
- Wolfgang Haffner (born 1965), Funk and jazz drummer
