= Puppet Bike =

Chicago street performance group

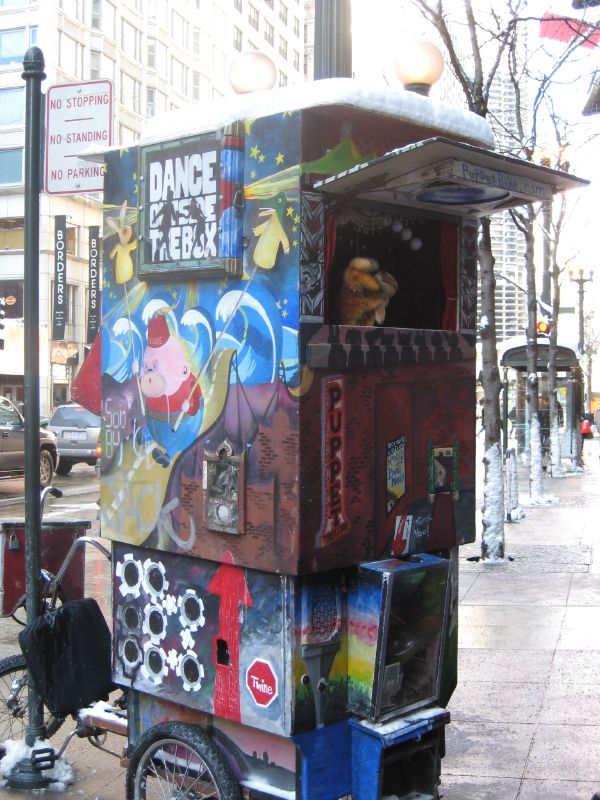
A common performance

Puppet Bike is a small street performer group in Chicago. The bike, which is complete with a fully mobile stage, is a common sight on the streets of the Andersonville neighborhood and in downtown in the Loop.

== Creation ==
The puppet bike concept was created by artist and inventor Jason Trusty around 2002 and started publicly performing around 2004. The bike itself consists of a large custom-built (by Trusty and his brother Eric) tricycle complete with a small box on the back which serves as a stage for puppet shows. The box is brightly decorated with images of the puppets themselves and other designs. Solar panels on the roof help power the boombox (which provides music for the shows), as well as fans inside the box that help cool the performer.

Originally, the concept was developed for a bipolar friend of Trusty who was unemployed. The bike allowed this friend to make some extra money at his own pace, and to simply stop and go home when he was tired of it.

The original bike was generally parked outside of the Chicago Cultural Center and was subject to a significant amount of vandalism when not in use. It was sometimes painted over with graffiti, tipped over, and broken. According to Trusty: "We get just as much a kick out of people who don't like the bike, or think that it's scary."

== Performances ==
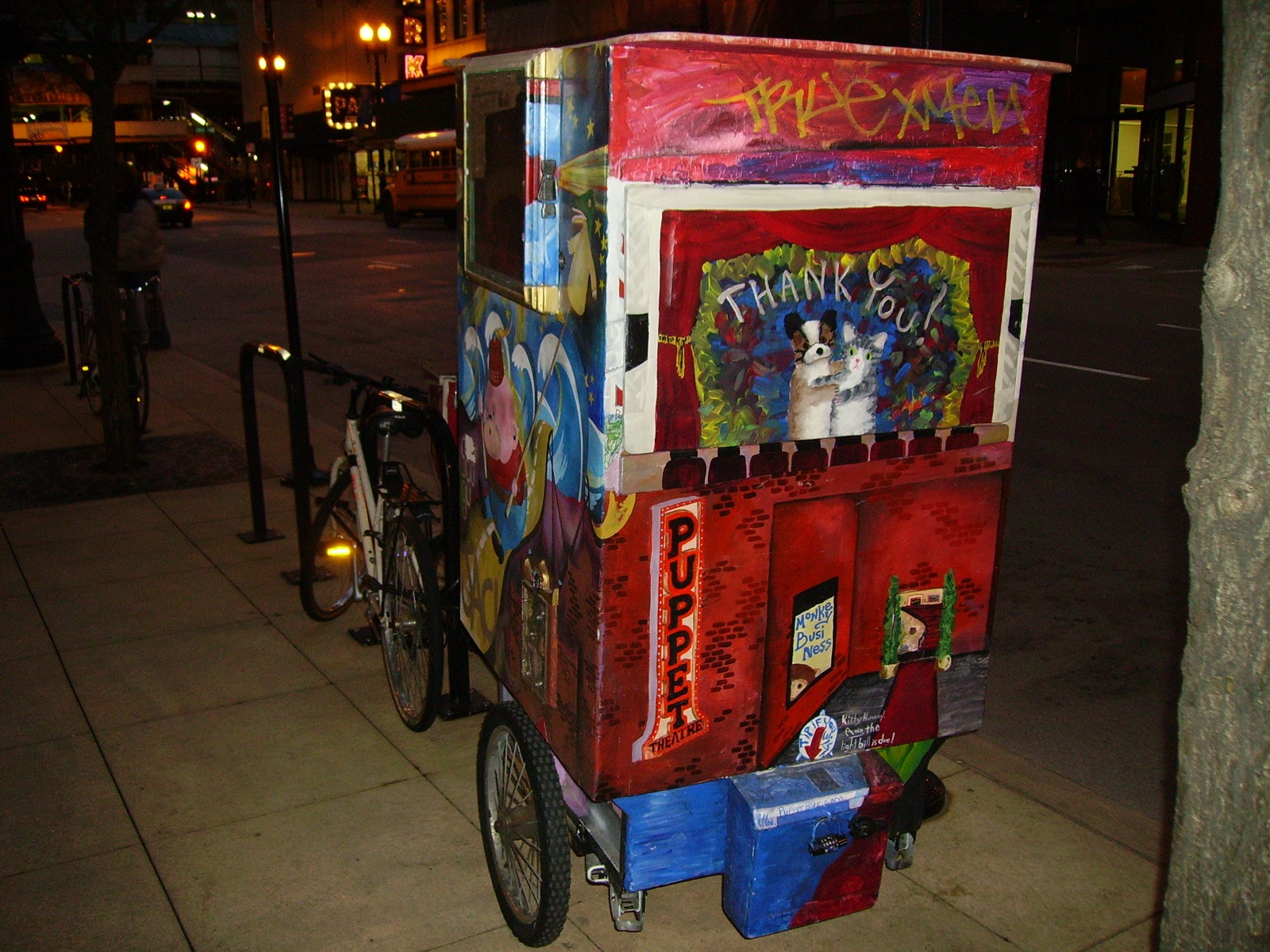
A parked puppet bike

Initially, Trusty himself and 8 other performers rode the bike around Chicago, stopping at strategic corners to climb inside the box. Each performance lasted 2 to 4 hours and consisted of several different puppets with an animal theme. The puppets generally danced to various kinds of music and interacted with each other in other ways. The puppets also interacted with the audiences, waving to people, giving high fives, and sometimes popping out from a small door at waist height to gesture towards the tip box. Performers worked for tips only (generally placed in a locked box attached to the front of the enclosed staging area).

The popularity of the bike increased to the point that Trusty began to turn away people interested in performing. The summer 2007 lineup included the bipolar friend, an artist from Ontario, Canada, bicyclists, teachers and theatre buffs. The performers kept the majority of their earnings, while Trusty kept a small portion for bike maintenance. In the summer of 2008, Trusty had planned to take the bike through Canada to the Arctic.

By 2019, Trusty had sold the bike to Chicago artist Wendy Beyer, who operated it with Michael King, a longtime Puppet Bike performer. According to King in 2019, he had operated Puppet Bike alone almost exclusively for the prior 10 years. Beyer subsequently moved from Chicago and King continued to perform as of 2025.
