= Altdorf, Wisconsin =

- Unincorporated community
- Location within Wisconsin Location within the United States
- Coordinates: 44°25′03″N 89°59′21″W
- Country: United States
- State: Wisconsin
- County: Wood
- Named for: Altdorf, Switzerland
- Elevation: 1,053 ft (321 m)
- Time zone: UTC-6 (Central (CST))
  - Summer (DST): UTC-5 (CDT)
- Area codes: 715 & 534

Altdorf is an unincorporated community in Wood County, in the U.S. state of Wisconsin.

== History ==
A post office was established at Altdorf in 1885, and remained in operation until 1905. The community was named after Altdorf, in Switzerland, the native home of a share of the first settlers.

The community once had a schoolhouse, Altdorf School, now defunct.
